= Gozo Region =

Gozo Region Reġjun Għawdex
- Region of Malta
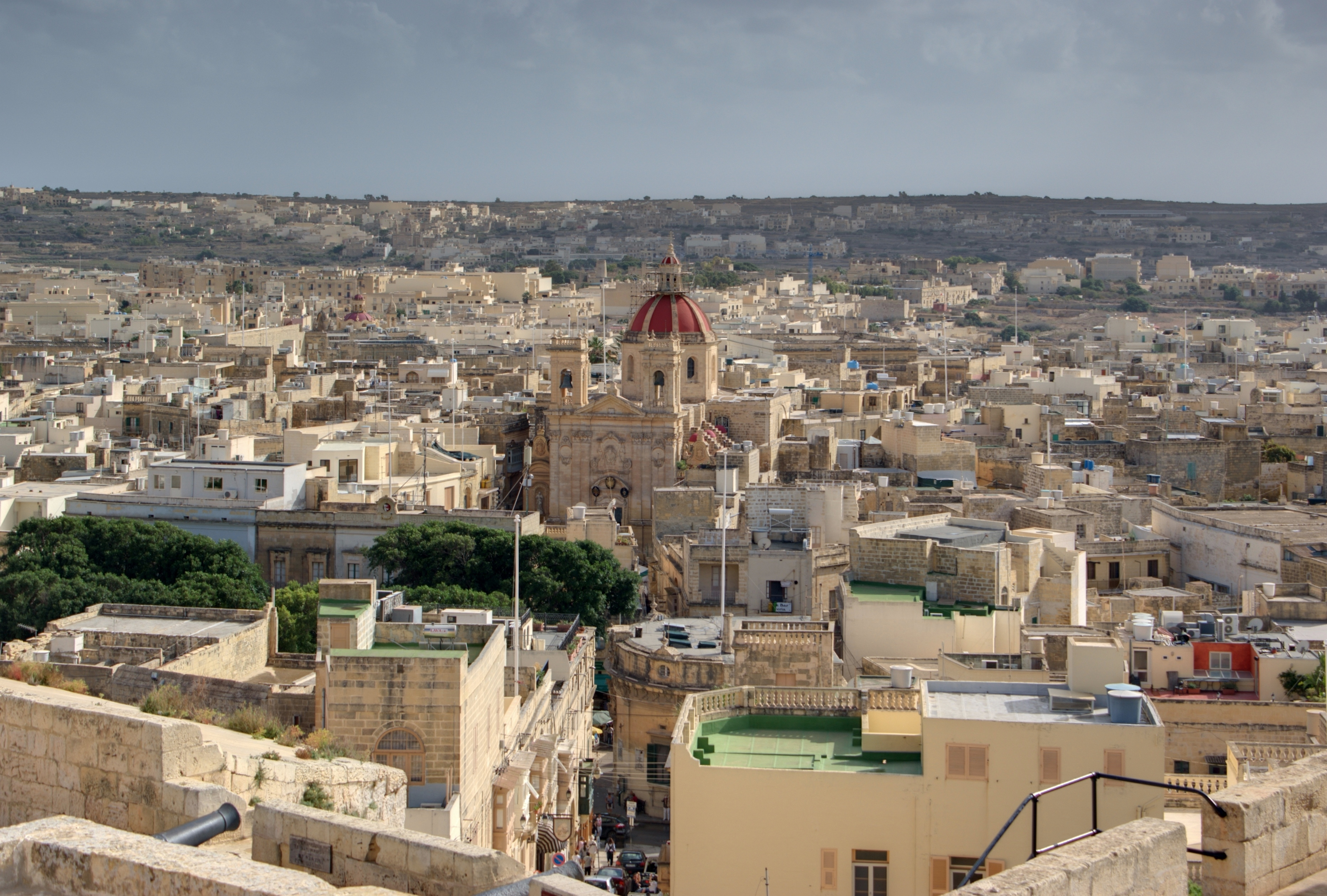
- Victoria

- Flag Coat of arms
- Interactive map of Gozo Region
- Coordinates: 36°02′41.5″N 14°14′20.2″E
- Country: Malta
- Islands: Gozo and Comino
- Local Councils Act: 30 June 1993
- Capital: Victoria

Government Regional Committee
  - Regional President: Samuel Azzopardi (PN)

Area
  - Total: 67 km^{2} (26 sq mi)

Population (2020)
  - Total: 34,563
  - Density: 520/km^{2} (1,300/sq mi)
- Demonym: Gozitan
- Time zone: UTC+01:00 (CET)
  - Summer (DST): UTC+02:00 (CEST)
- Dialing code: 356
- ISO 3166 code: MT-GO
- Local councils: 14
- Website: Official website

Gozo Region (Maltese: Reġjun Għawdex) is one of six regions of Malta. The region includes the islands of Gozo, Comino and several little islets such as Cominotto. The region does not border any other regions, but it is close to the Northern Region.

It was created by the Local Councils Act of 1993. It is the only original region still in existence, since the other two (Malta Majjistral and Malta Xlokk) were split into smaller regions by Act No. XVI of 2009.

== Administrative divisions ==
=== Districts ===
Gozo Region corresponds to Gozo and Comino Statistical District.

=== Local councils ===
Gozo Region includes 14 local councils:

- Fontana
- Għajnsielem - include the areas of Mġarr, Gozo, Fort Chambray and Comino
- Għarb - include the areas of Ta' Pinu, Birbuba and Santu Pietru
- Għasri - include the area of Għammar and Wied il-Għasri
- Kerċem - include the area of Santa Luċija
- Munxar - include the area of Xlendi
- Nadur - include the areas of Daħlet Qorrot, San Blas, Nadur, Ta' Kuxxina and Ta' Kenuna
- Qala - include the area of Ħondoq ir-Rummien
- San Lawrenz - include the areas of Ta' Dbieġi and Dwejra
- Sannat - include the areas of Mġarr ix-Xini, Ta' Ċenċ and Ta' Saguna
- Rabat (Victoria) - include the areas of Taċ-Ċawla and Ċittadella
- Xagħra - include the area of Ramla Bay
- Xewkija - include the area of Tal-Barmil
- Żebbuġ - include the areas of Marsalforn and Qbajjar

Hamlets

- Marsalforn
- Santa Luċija
- Xlendi

== Regional Committee ==
The current Gozo Regional Committee (Maltese: Kumitat Reġjonali Għawdex) was created by Act No. XVI of 2009, and was formally constituted in 2012. It is made up of:

Office	Officeholder
President	Samuel Azzopardi
Vice President	Joseph Sultana
Members	David Apap Agius
Members	Daniel Attard
Members	Mario Azzopardi
Members	Paul Azzopardi
Members	Saviour Borg
Members	Clint Camilleri
Members	Anthony Cassar
Members	Francis Cauchi
Members	Joseph Cordina
Members	Charles Frank Said
Members	Nicky Saliba
Members	Philip Vella
Executive Secretary	Ian Paul Bajada (acting)

The Gozo Regional Committee is housed in the Banca Giuratale.
