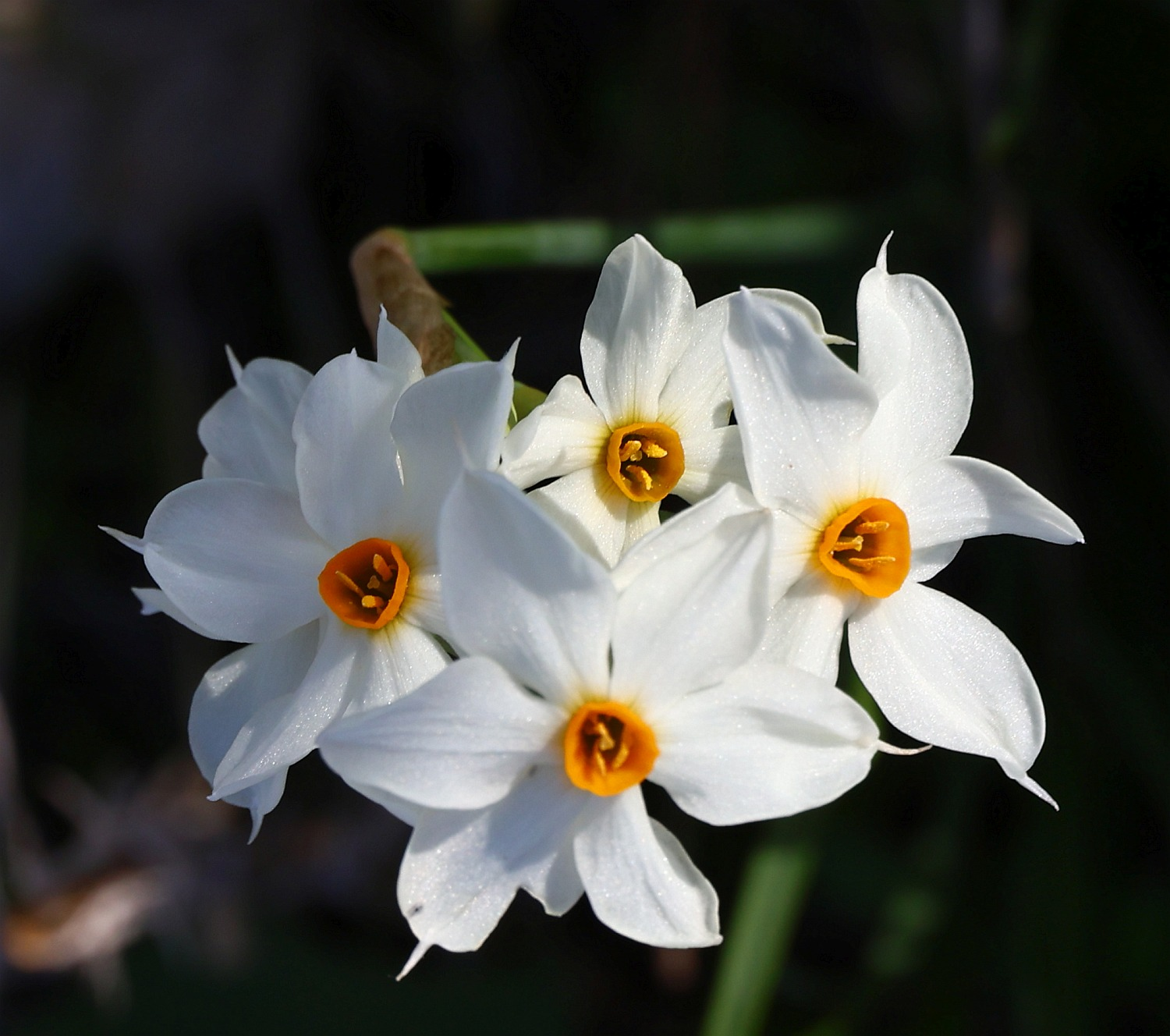

Scientific classification
- Kingdom: Plantae
- Clade: Tracheophytes
- Clade: Angiosperms
- Clade: Monocots
- Order: Asparagales
- Family: Amaryllidaceae
- Subfamily: Amaryllidoideae
- Genus: Narcissus
- Species: N. × briffae

Binomial name
- Narcissus × briffae Misfud

= Narcissus × briffae =

Daffodil species

Narcissus × briffae is a naturally-occurring hybrid daffodil in the family Amaryllidaceae. Its parents are N. deficiens and N. tazetta subsp. aequilimbus, and it is found through the Mediterranean where those species co-occur. This hybrid was first discovered in 2023 in Gozo, where it had previously been misidentified as Narcissus elegans.

== Description ==
Narcissus × briffae grows in clusters of 25–70 plants, each with 2–5 flowers at the end of a scape about 30 cm long. Each plant has one or two narrow leaves, which are 3–5 mm wide, fleshy, and present during anthesis. A basal sheath extends 10 mm above the ground.

Flowering occurs in Malta from the end of October to the beginning of November, depending on the first autumnal rains. The flowers have a delicate scent. The tepals are cream-colored, lanceolate or obovate in shape, and about 10 mm long and 5 mm wide. The lemon-colored corona is about 4 mm wide, and while it is more or less circular, it has three notches, dents or creases or assumes a slightly trigonal outline.

Plants are generally sterile, with pollen that is mostly (90%) shriveled and dysfunctional. The fruiting pods fall prematurely or lack viable seeds, although in very rare cases a few seeds can be seen.

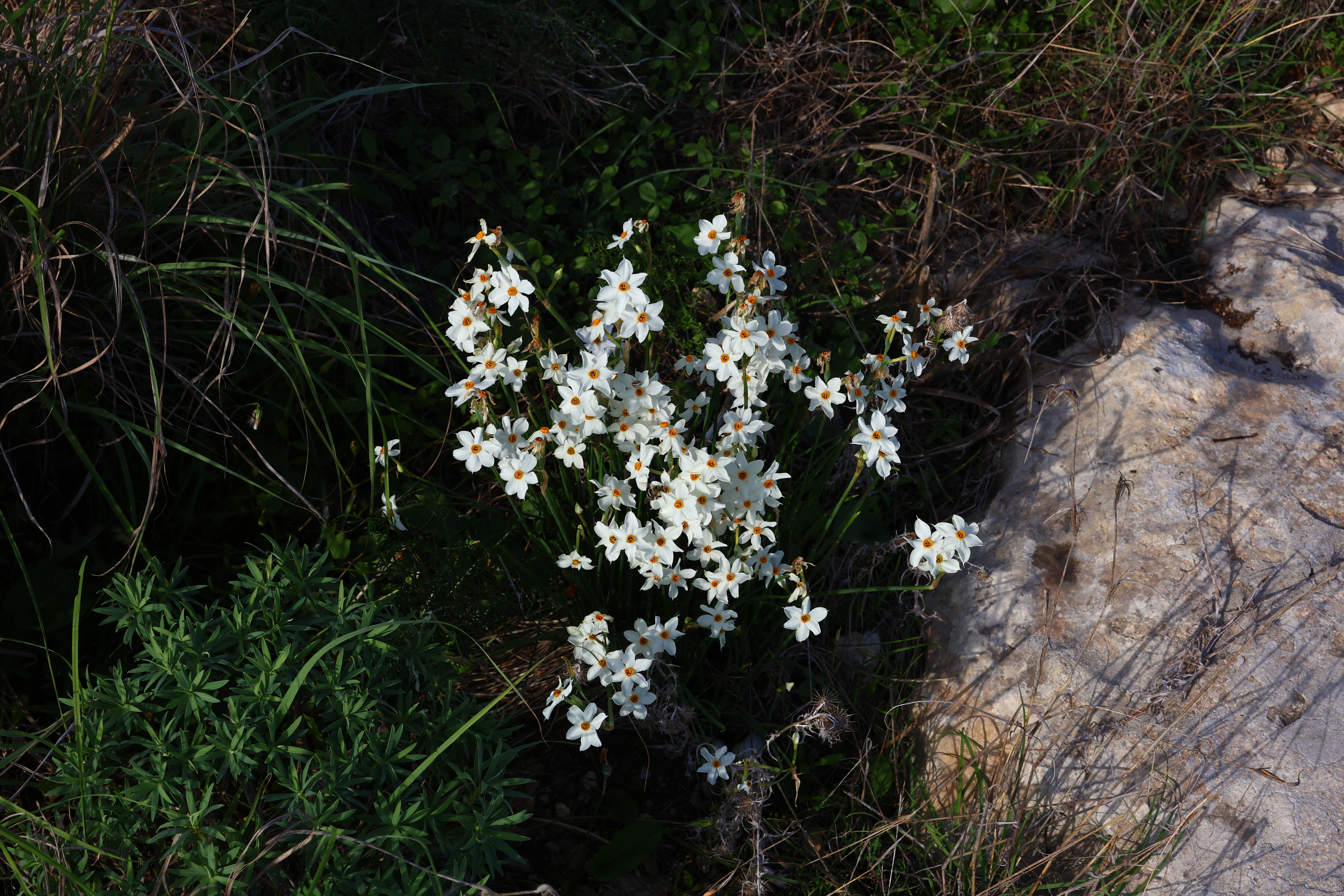
Narcissus × briffae from the locus classics in Gozo, Malta

== Taxonomy ==
The type specimen of Narcissus × briffae was collected by Maltese botanist Stephen Misfud in 2023 near Ħondoq ir-Rummien in Qala, Malta, where it was growing within 100 m of both parent species. Misfud formally described the hybrid in 2024 and named it after Maltese naturalist Michael Briffa, who dedicated most of his life researching and exploring local biodiversity, namely plants and fungi.
