= Western Region, Malta =

Western Region Reġjun Punent
- Region
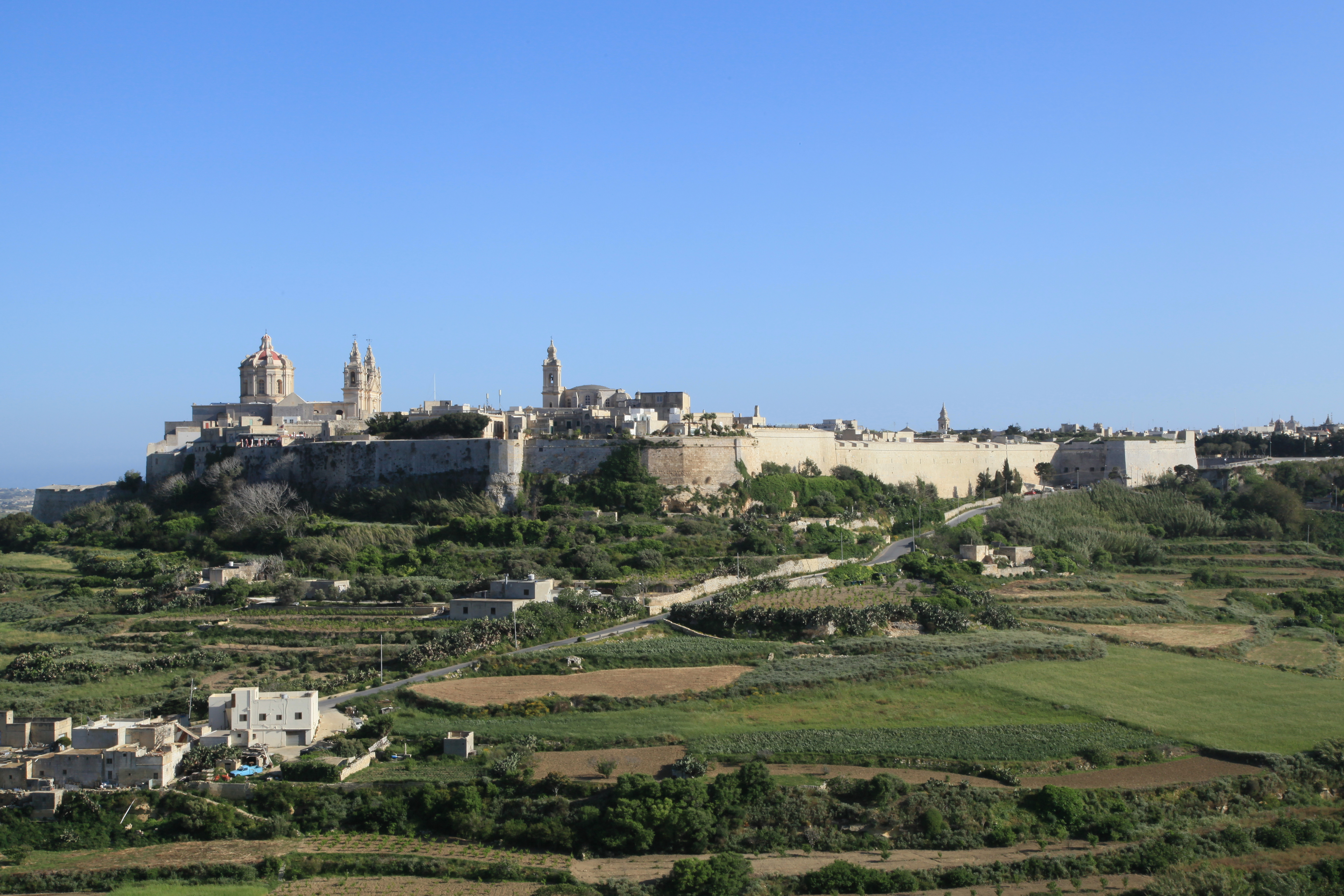
- Fortified city of Mdina

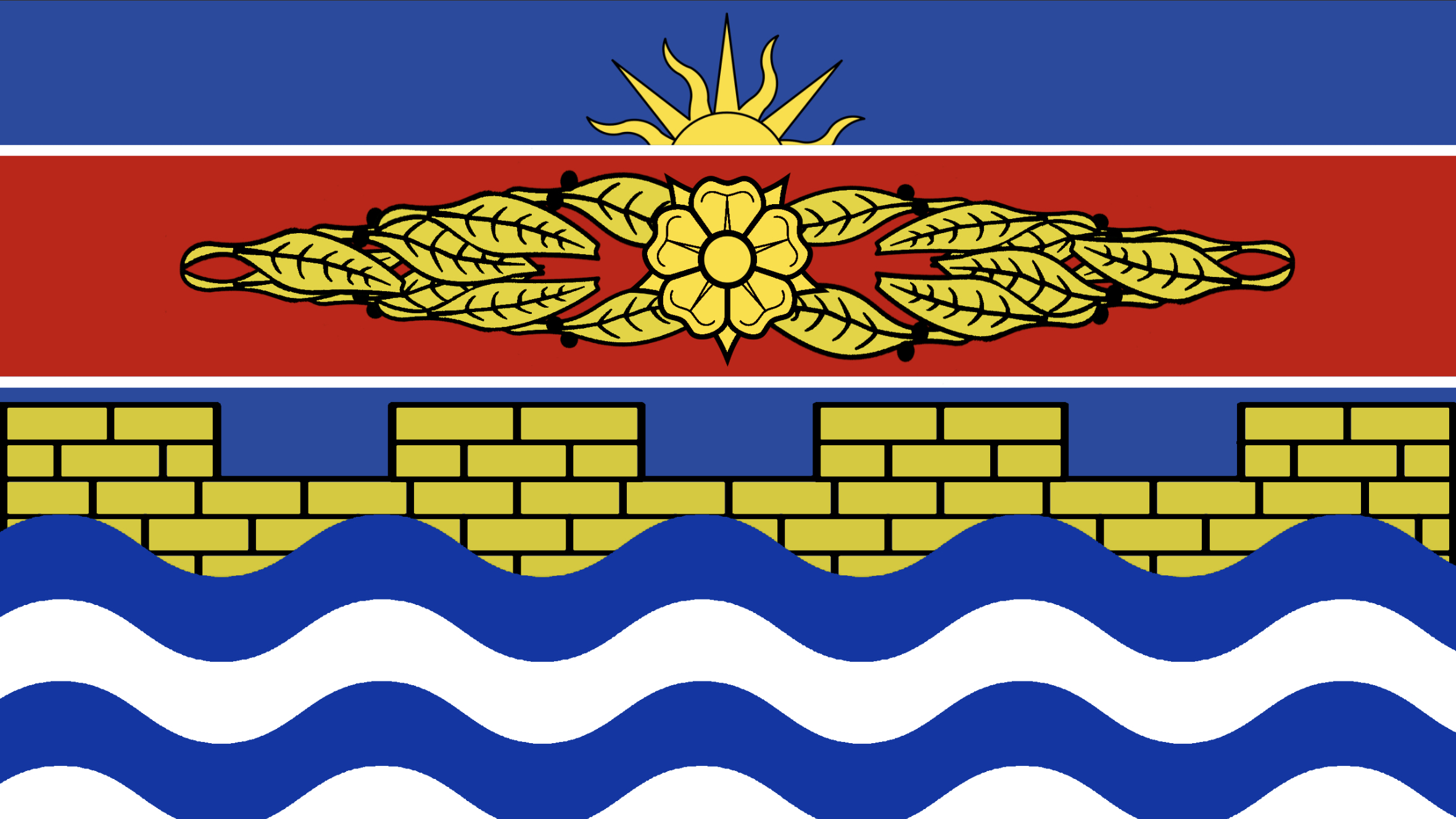
- Flag

- Map of the Western Region
- Coordinates: 35°51′N 14°25′E
- Country: Malta
- Act No. XIV of 2019: 26 April 2019
- Seat: Rabat

Government
  - President: Sandro Azzopardi

Area
  - Total: 72.47 km^{2} (27.98 sq mi)

Population (2021)
  - Total: 65,266
  - Density: 900.6/km^{2} (2,333/sq mi)
- Time zone: UTC+01:00 (CET)
  - Summer (DST): UTC+02:00 (CEST)
- Dialing code: 356
- Local councils: 10
- Website: Official website

The Western Region (Maltese: Reġjun Punent) is one of the six regions of Malta. Spread over an area of 72.47 km^{2} (27.98 sq mi), it is located in the southwestern part of the main island of Malta. The region borders the Northern and Southern regions. While the region is amongst the largest regions by land area, it is the least populated region in the main island. It was created by the Act No. XIV of 2019 and carved from parts of the Central Region in 2022. The region was one of the shooting locations of the popular television series Game of Thrones.

== History ==
The Western Region was officially created by the Act No. XIV of 2019, which came into effect in 2022. It was carved from parts of the erstwhile Central Region.

== Geography ==
Western Region is one of the six regions of Malta. Spread over an area of 72.47 km^{2} (27.98 sq mi), it is located in the southwestern part of the main island of Malta. It is part of the NUTS-3 statistical region of the main island of Malta. The region borders the Northern and Southern regions. While the region is amongst the largest regions by land area, it is the least populated region in the main island. It includes ten local councils–Dingli, Kirkop, Mdina, Mqabba, Qrendi, Rabat, Safi, Siġġiewi, Żebbuġ, and Żurrieq. The highest point in Malta is located at Dingli in the region.

== Demographics ==
As of 2021, the Western region had a population of 65,266 individuals. While the region is amongst the largest regions by land area, it is the least populated region in the main island. The populace included 35,212 males and 33,462 females. About 10,724 (16%) inhabitants were under the age of seventeen. The population also included about 5,736 foreigners residing in the region. Christianity is the largest religion, adhered to by 94.2% of the population. About 1.6% of the population practice Islam, and the remaining population have no religion or have not declared so.
