= South Eastern Region =

- Region of Malta
- 2009–2019
- Flag Coat of arms
- Map of South Eastern Region
- Area
  - 2014: 36.2 km^{2} (14.0 sq mi)
- Population
  - 2014: 99,301
- History
  - Act No. XVI of 2009: 30 September 2009
  - Act No. XIV of 2019: 26 April 2019
- Political subdivisions: 15 local councils
Succeeded by
Port Region, Malta; Southern Region, Malta

The South Eastern Region (Maltese: Reġjun Xlokk) is a former region of Malta. The region included the southeastern part of the main island of Malta, including the capital Valletta. The region bordered the Central and Southern Regions.

It was created by the Act No. XVI of 2009 out of part of Malta Xlokk. Act No. XIV of 2019 abolished the region, and its territory was divided between the newly formed Port Region and the Southern Region.

== Administrative divisions ==
=== Districts ===
South Eastern Region included parts of the South Eastern and Southern Harbour Districts.

=== Local councils ===
South Eastern Region included 15 local councils:

- Birgu (Città Vittoriosa) - include the area of Tal-Ħawli
- Bormla (Città Cospicua) - include the area of San Ġwann t'Għuxa
- Fgura - include the area of Tal-Liedna
- Floriana - include the areas of Sa Maison, Balzunetta and Valletta Waterfront
- Kalkara - include the areas of Rinella, Bighi, Ricasoli and Smart City Malta
- Marsa - include the areas of Albert Town and Menqa
- Marsaskala - include the areas of St. Thomas' Bay, Żonqor Battery and Bellavista
- Marsaxlokk - include the areas of Delimara and Tas-Silġ
- Paola - include the areas of Għajn Dwieli and Corradino
- Senglea (Città Invicta)
- Tarxien
- Valletta (Città Umilissima)
- Xgħajra
- Żabbar (Città Hompesch) - include the areas of St Peter's and Bulebel iż-Żgħir
- Żejtun (Città Beland) - include the areas of Bulebel, Ġebel San Martin, Bir id-Deheb, Tal-Barrani, Ħajt il-Wied and Ħal Tmin

Hamlets

- St. Peter's

== Regional Committee ==
The last South Eastern Regional Committee (Maltese: Kumitat Reġjonali Xlokk) was made up of:

Office	Officeholder
President	Paul Farrugia
Vice President	Guzeppi Attard
Members	Joseph Abela
Members	John Boxall
Members	Mario Calleja
Members	Byron Camilleri
Members	Justin John Camilleri
Members	Speranza Chircop
Members	Francis Debono
Members	Alexei Dingli
Members	Nigel Holland
Members	Edric Micallef
Members	Roderick Spiteri
Members	Anthony Valvo
Members	Marc Vella Bonnici
Members	Alison Zerafa
Executive Secretary	Joan Mangion (acting)
