= Southern Region, Malta =

Southern Region Reġjun Nofsinhar
- Region of Malta
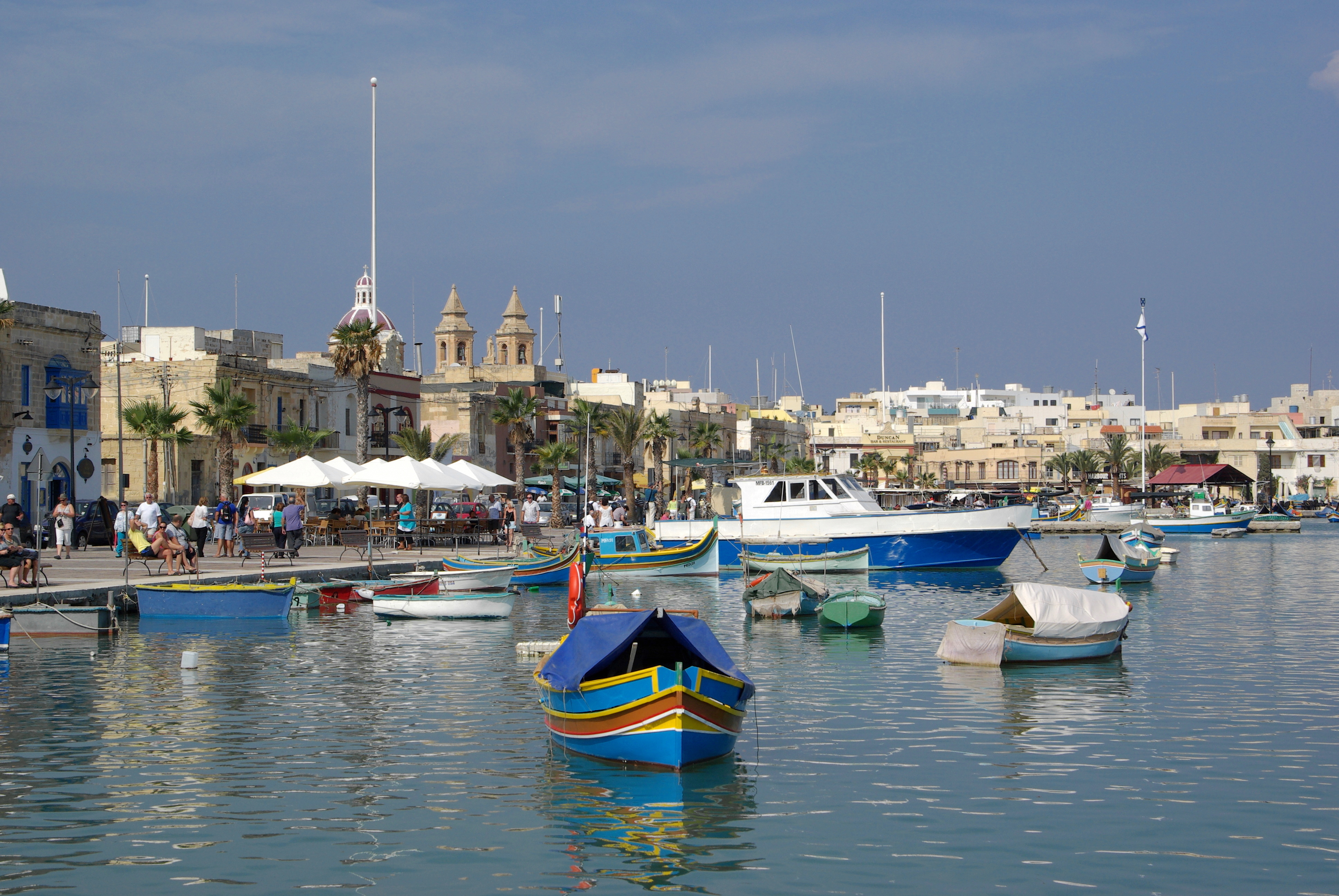
- Marsaxlokk

- Flag Coat of arms

- Map of the Southern Region
- Coordinates: 35°52′42.2″N 14°28′12.1″E
- Country: Malta
- Island: Malta
- Act No. XVI of 2009: 30 September 2009
- Seat: Qormi

Government Regional Council
  - Regional President: Jesmond Aquilina

Area
  - Total: 78.9 km^{2} (30.5 sq mi)

Population (2021)
  - Total: 106,593
  - Density: 1,350/km^{2} (3,500/sq mi)
- Time zone: UTC+01:00 (CET)
  - Summer (DST): UTC+02:00 (CEST)
- Dialing code: 356
- Local councils: 12
- Website: Official website

The Southern Region (Maltese: Reġjun Nofsinhar) is one of six regions of Malta. The region covers the southeastern part of the main island of Malta. The region borders the Northern, Eastern, Port and Western Regions.

It was created by the Act No. XVI of 2009 out of parts of Malta Majjistral and Malta Xlokk. Act No. XIV of 2019, which led to a regional reform in 2021, significantly altered the region's borders and composition, and reduced its local councils from 14 to 12.

== Administrative divisions ==
=== Districts ===
Southern Region includes parts of the Northern Harbour District, South Eastern District and Southern Harbour District.

=== Local councils ===
Southern Region includes 12 local councils:

- Birżebbuġa - include the areas of Qajjenza, Tal-Papa, Bengħisa Battery, Ħal Far, and Għar Dalam
- Għaxaq - include the areas of Ħas-Saptan, Ħal Dmikki, Tal-Qattus and Tal-Millieri
- Gudja - include the areas of Bir Miftuħ, Tal-Mithna and Xlejli
- Ħamrun - include the areas of Blata l-Bajda and Rabbat
- Luqa - include the area of Ħal Farruġ
- Marsa - include the areas of Albert Town and Menqa (annexed in 2021 from South Eastern Region)
- Marsaskala - include the areas of St. Thomas' Bay, Żonqor Battery and Bellavista (annexed in 2021 from South Eastern region)
- Marsaxlokk - include the areas of Delimara and Tas-Silġ (annexed in 2021 from South Eastern region)
- Qormi (Città Pinto) - include the areas of Ħandaq and Tal-Ħlas
- Santa Luċija
- Santa Venera - include parts of Fleur-de-Lys and Mrieħel (annexed in 2021 from Central region)
- Żejtun (Città Beland) - include the areas of Bulebel, Ġebel San Martin, Bir id-Deheb, Tal-Barrani, Ħajt il-Wied and Ħal Tmin (annexed in 2021 from South Eastern region)

Hamlets

- Ħal Farruġ

=== Local councils lost in 2021 ===
After the 2021 local government reform, the region ceded 6 of its local councils to the newly established Western region:

- Kirkop
- Mqabba
- Qrendi - include the areas of Maqluba, Wied iż-Żurrieq and Ħaġar Qim
- Safi
- Siġġiewi (Città Ferdinand) - include the areas of Għar Lapsi, Fawwara and Girgenti
- Żebbuġ (Città Rohan) - include the areas of Ħal Muxi, Ħal Mula, Ħal Dwin
- Żurrieq - include the areas of Bubaqra, Nigret and Tal-Bebbux

== Regional Council ==
The current Southern Regional Counsil (Maltese: Kunsill Reġjonali Nofsinhar) is made up of:

Office	Officeholder
President	Jesmond Aquilina
Deputy President	Marija Sara Vella
Members
Members	Darren Abela
Members	Scott Camilleri
Members	John Schembri
Members	Doris Abela
Members	Josef Masini Vento
Members	Christian Sammut
Members	Mario Calleja
Members	Josef Azzopardi
Members	Steven Grech
Members	Charmaine St. John
Members	Stephen Sultana
Executive Secretary	Mariella Strout
