= Northern Region, Malta =

Northern Region Reġjun Tramuntana
- Region of Malta
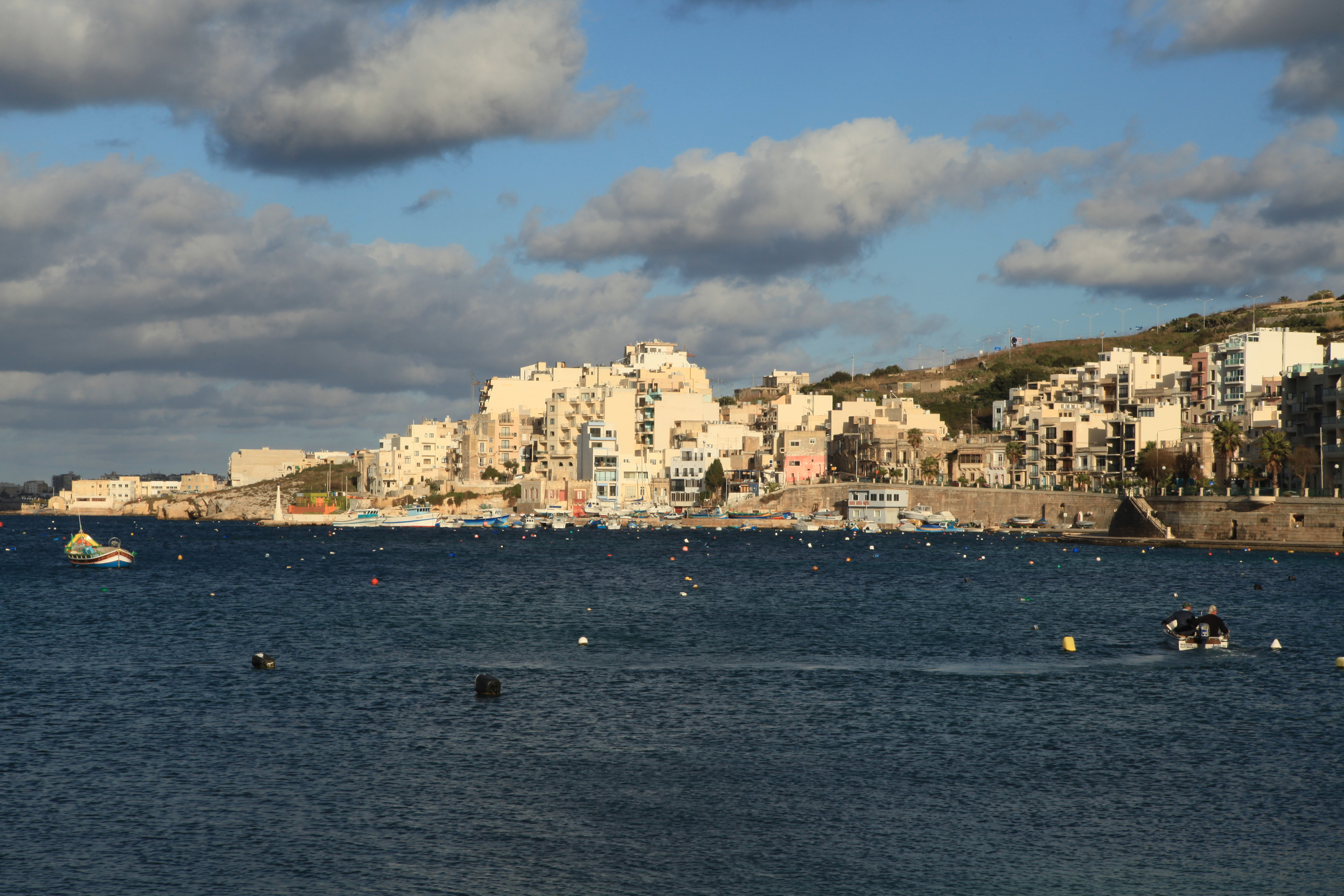
- St. Paul's Bay

- Flag Coat of arms

- Map of the Northern Region
- Coordinates: 35°57′00.8″N 14°24′44.0″E
- Country: Malta
- Island: Malta
- Act No. XVI of 2009: 30 September 2009
- Seat: St. Paul's Bay

Government Regional Council
  - Regional President: Clifford Galea

Area
  - Total: 82.07 km^{2} (31.69 sq mi)

Population (2020)
  - Total: 118,588
  - Density: 1,445/km^{2} (3,742/sq mi)
- Time zone: UTC+01:00 (CET)
  - Summer (DST): UTC+02:00 (CEST)
- Dialing code: 356
- Local councils: 9
- Website: Official website

The Northern Region (Maltese: Reġjun Tramuntana) is one of six regions of Malta. The region includes the northwestern part of the main island of Malta. The region borders the Eastern, Southern and Western Regions, and is also close to Gozo Region.

It was created by the Act No. XVI of 2009 out of part of Malta Majjistral. Act No. XIV of 2019, which led to a regional reform in 2021, altered the region's composition and reduced its local councils from 12 to 9.

== Administrative divisions ==
=== Districts ===
Northern Region includes the entire Northern District and parts of the Northern Harbour District and Western Districts.

=== Current local councils ===
Northern Region includes 9 local councils:

- Attard (annexed in 2021 from Central region)
- Balzan (annexed in 2021 from Central region)
- Mellieħa - includes the areas of Ċirkewwa, Marfa, Armier Bay, Għadira, Manikata, Golden Bay, Santa Maria Estate, Paradise Bay, Anchor Bay (Popeye Village), Ta' Pennellu, Mġiebaħ, and Selmun Palace and Selmunett.
- Mġarr - includes the areas of Żebbiegħ, Ġnejna Bay, Binġemma, Ta' Mrejnu, Għajn Tuffieħa, Ballut, Lippija, Santi, Fomm ir-Riħ, Abatija and Mselliet.
- Mosta - includes the areas of Bidnija, Blata l-Għolja, Santa Margarita, Tarġa Gap, Ta' Żokkrija and Ta' Mlit
- Mtarfa
- Naxxar - includes the areas of Baħar iċ-Ċagħaq, Salna, Magħtab, Birguma, Sgħajtar, San Pawl tat-Tarġa and Simblija
- San Ġwann (annexed in 2021 from Central region)
- St. Paul's Bay - includes the areas of Burmarrad, Buġibba, Qawra, Xemxija, Wardija, Pwales, San Martin, Mbordin and San Pawl Milqi and part of Bidnija

==== Hamlets ====
- Baħar iċ-Ċagħaq
- Burmarrad

=== Local councils lost in 2021 ===
After the 2021 local government reform, the region ceded 6 of its local councils to the Eastern and Western regions:

- Dingli - includes the areas of Buskett and Dingli Cliffs (ceded to Western region)
- Għargħur - includes the area of Xwieki (ceded to Eastern region)
- Mdina (Città Notabile) (ceded to Western region)
- Pembroke - includes the areas of St. Andrew's, St. Patrick's and White Rocks (ceded to Eastern region)
- Rabat - includes the areas of Baħrija, Tal-Virtù, Mtaħleb, Kunċizzjoni, Bieb ir-Ruwa and Għar Barka (ceded to Western region)
- Swieqi - includes the areas of Madliena, Ibraġ, Victoria Gardens and High Ridge (ceded to Eastern region)

Hamlets
- Baħrija
- Madliena
- Tal-Virtù

== Regional Council ==
The current Northern Regional Council (Maltese: Kunsill Reġjonali Tramuntana) is made up of:

Office	Officeholder
President	Clifford Galea
Vice President	Paul Vella
Members	John Buttigieg
Members	Romilda B. Zarb
Members	Anne Marie Muscat Fenech Adami
Members	Dean Hili
Members	Christianne Mifsud
Members	Alfred Grima
Members	Stephen Cordina
Members	Trevor Fenech
Executive Secretary	George Abdilla
