= Malta Majjistral =

Coordinates: 35°54′N 14°24′E

- Region of Malta
- 1993–2009
- Map of Malta Majjistral
- Area
  - 2005: 163 km^{2} (63 sq mi)
- Population
  - 2005: 227,117
- History
  - Local Councils Act: 30 June 1993
  - Act No. XVI of 2009: 30 September 2009
- Political subdivisions: 3 districts 29 local councils
Succeeded by
Central Region, Malta
Northern Region, Malta
Southern Region, Malta

Malta Majjistral, also known as the North Western Region, was a region of Malta between 1993 and 2009. It was located on the main island of Malta, bordering Malta Xlokk. The name referred to the Mistral wind, which is Majjistral in Maltese.

The region was created by the Local Councils Act of 30 June 1993, and was integrated into the constitution in 2001. It was abolished by Act No. XVI of 2009, and it was divided into the Northern Region, Central Region and part of the Southern Region.

== Subdivision ==
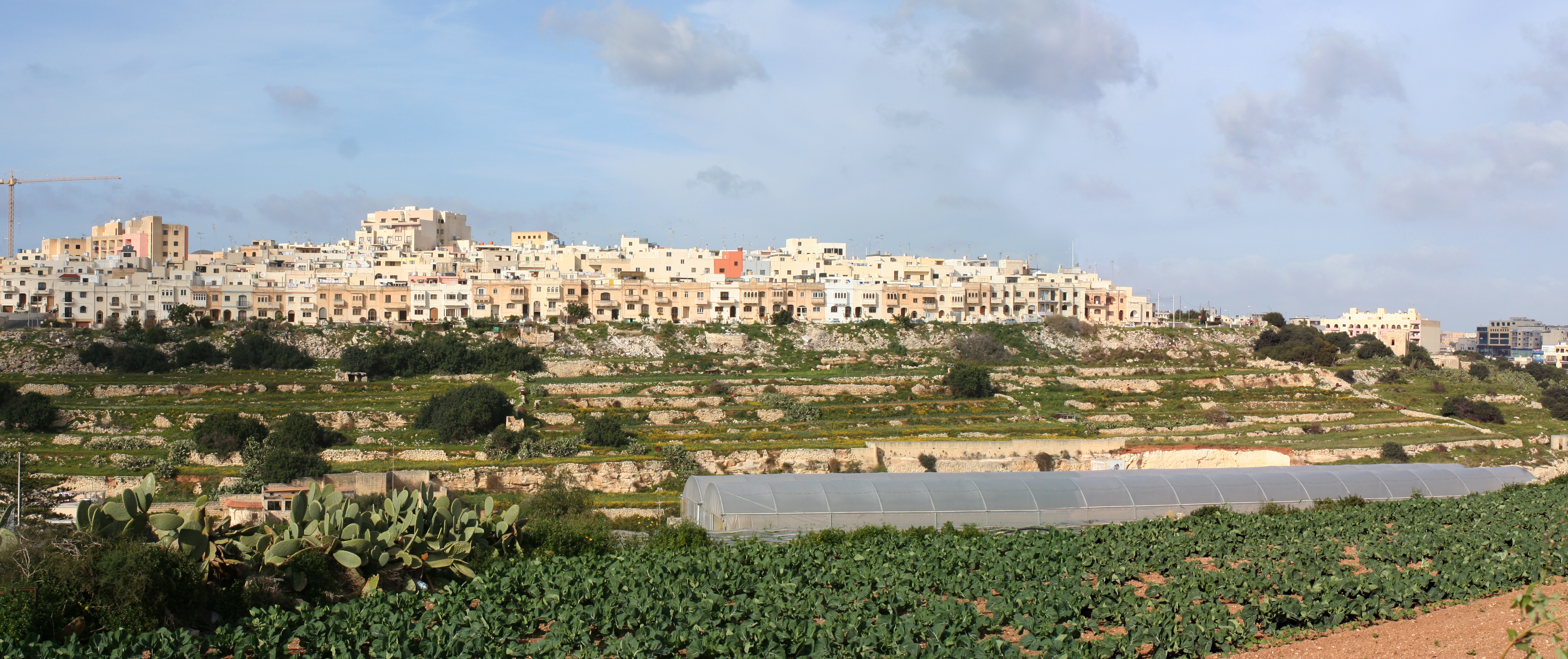
Birkirkara

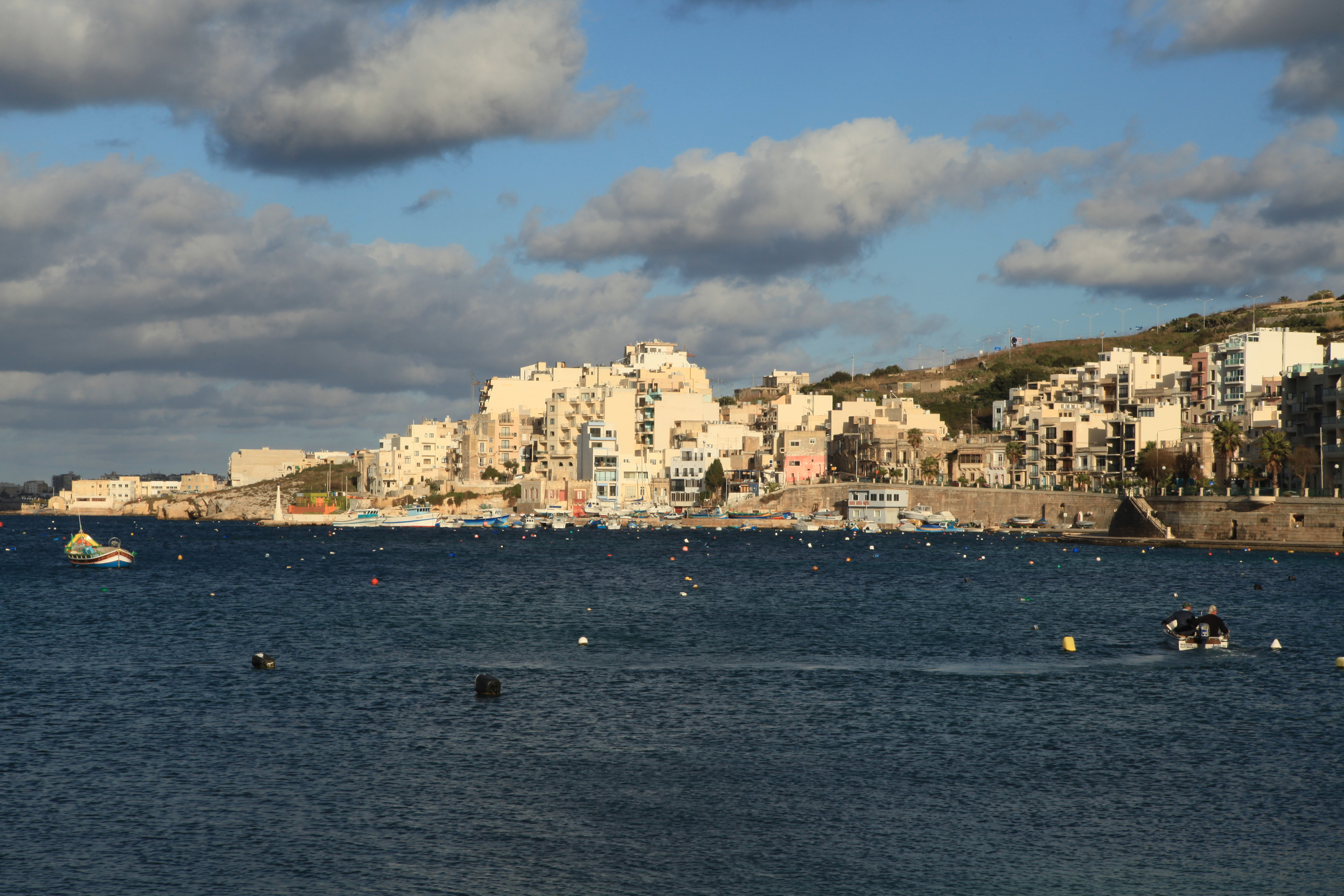
St. Paul's Bay

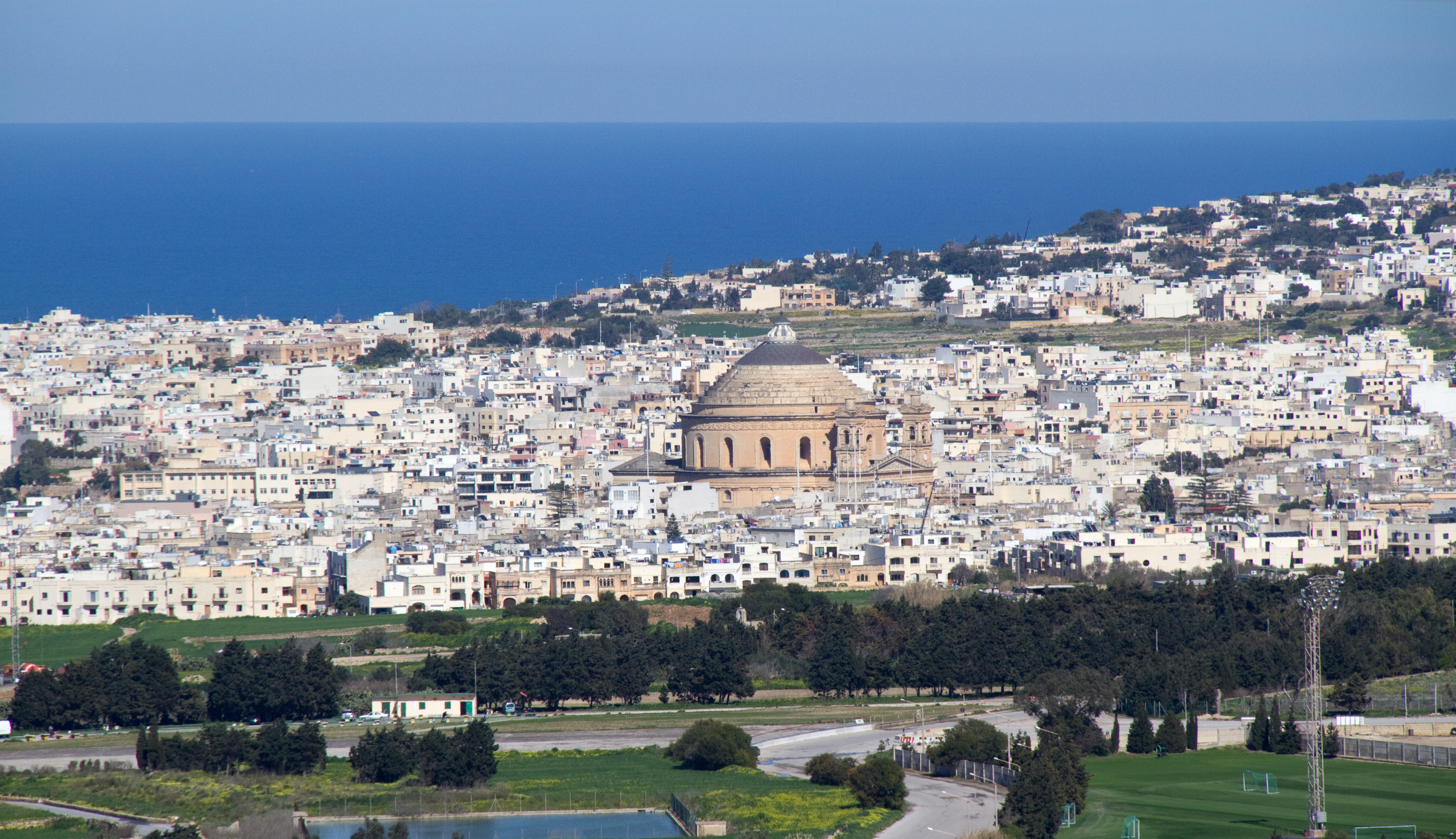
Mosta

=== Districts ===
The region included 3 statistical districts:

- Northern
- Northern Harbour
- Western

=== Local councils ===
Malta Majjistral included 29 local councils:

- Attard
- Balzan
- Birkirkara
- Dingli
- Għargħur
- Gżira
- Ħamrun
- Iklin
- Lija
- Mdina (Città Notabile)
- Mellieħa
- Mġarr
- Mosta
- Msida
- Mtarfa
- Naxxar
- Pembroke
- Pietà
- Qormi (Città Pinto)
- Rabat
- San Ġiljan
- San Ġwann
- San Pawl il-Baħar
- Santa Venera
- Siġġiewi (Città Ferdinand)
- Sliema
- Swieqi
- Ta' Xbiex
- Żebbuġ (Città Rohan)
