= Districts of Malta =

Malta is divided into districts. The four types of districts are regional councils, statistical districts, electoral districts, and policing districts.

== Regional Councils ==
Malta is divided into six regions for local-government and administrative purposes. Three regions were originally created by the Local Councils Act of 1993, and were integrated into the constitution in 2001. Two of the regions were split into smaller ones by Act No. XVI of 2009, and Malta was divided into five regions. Act No. XIV of 2019 reorganized the subdivision, establishing six regions, and was implemented in November 2021.

Each region has a Regional Council (Maltese: Kunsill Reġjonali), which consists of a Regional President, a Deputy President, an Executive Secretary and between 10 and 12 members.

=== Function ===
According to article 37B of the Local Governments' Act, the functions of Regional Councils include issuing calls for tenders for waste management services, conducting social impact evaluations, providing professional assistance across various sectors to local councils, coordinating with government entities and preparing annual Work Plans to address financial and human resource requirements.

=== Current regions ===
Eastern Region Gozo Region Northern Region Port Region Southern Region Western Region

Coat of arms	Region	Seat	Largest city	Area (km²)	Population (year)	Density (per km²)	Established
	Eastern Region	San Ġwann (not part of the region)	Birkirkara	20.3 km^{2} (7.8 sq mi)	115,908 (2021)	5,700/km^{2} (15,000/sq mi)	2021
	Gozo Region	Victoria		67 km^{2} (26 sq mi)	34,563 (2020)	520/km^{2} (1,300/sq mi)	1993
	Northern Region	St. Paul's Bay		82.07 km^{2} (31.69 sq mi)	118,588 (2020)	1,400/km^{2} (3,600/sq mi)	2009
	Port Region	Tarxien	Żabbar	15.75 km^{2} (6.08 sq mi)	69,880 (2020)	4,400/km^{2} (11,000/sq mi)	2021
	Southern Region	Qormi		78.9 km^{2} (30.5 sq mi)	106,593 (2021)	1,400/km^{2} (3,600/sq mi)	2009
	Western Region	Rabat	Żebbuġ	83.2 km^{2} (32.1 sq mi)	59,287 (2020)	710/km^{2} (1,800/sq mi)	2021

=== Former regions (2009-2021) ===
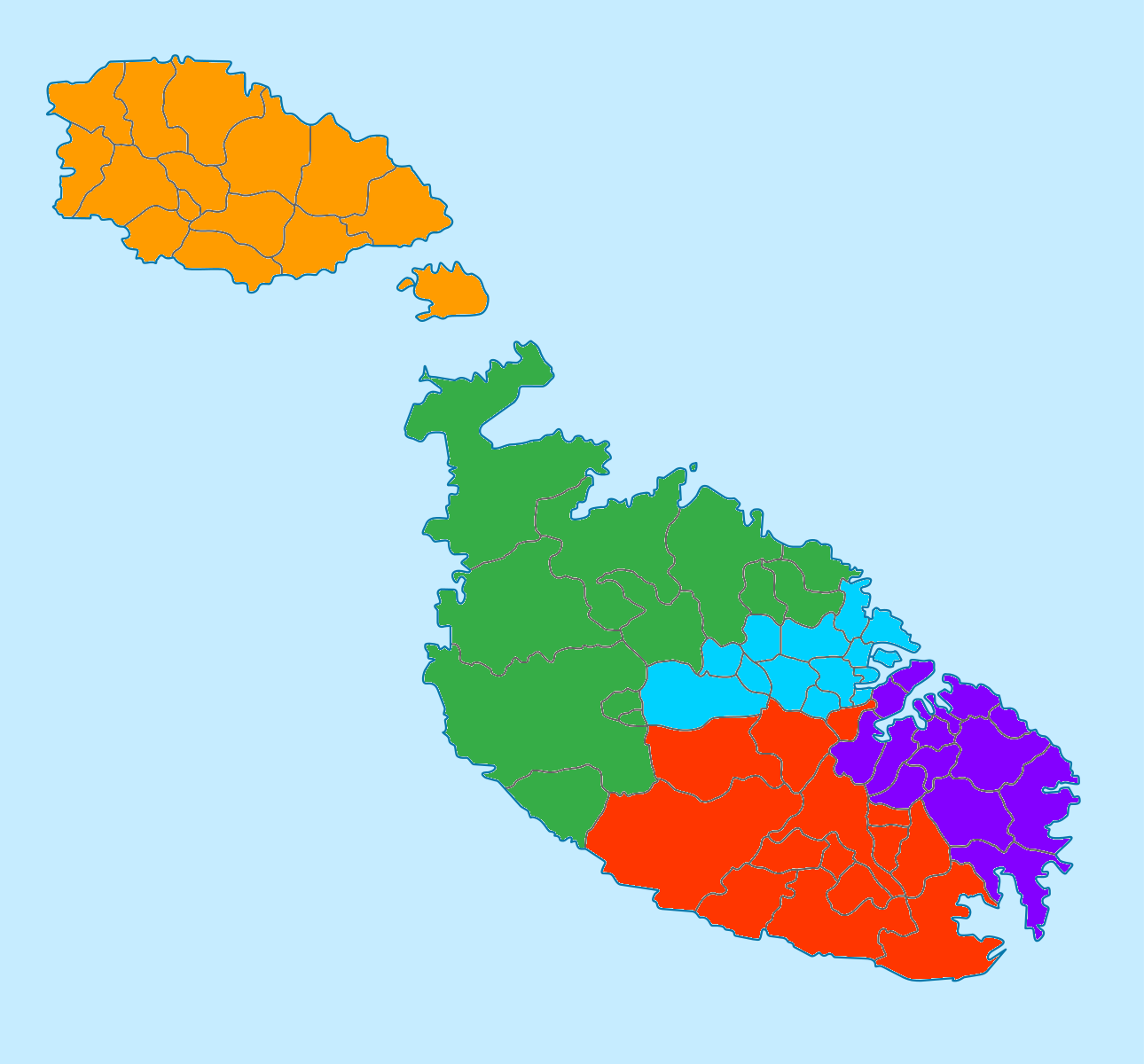
Central Region Gozo Region Northern Region South Eastern Region Southern Region

Coat of arms	Region	Seat	Largest city	Area	Population (2014)	Population density	Established	Abolished
	Central Region	San Ġwann	Birkirkara	23.6 km^{2} (9.1 sq mi)	111,994	4,700/km^{2} (12,000/sq mi)	2009	2021
	South Eastern Region	Valletta	Żabbar	36.2 km^{2} (14.0 sq mi)	99,301	2,700/km^{2} (7,000/sq mi)	2009	2021

=== Former regions (1993–2009) ===
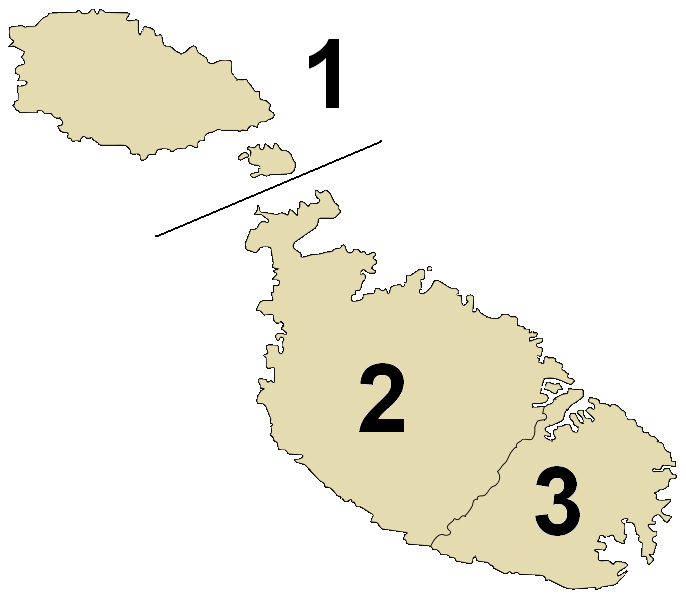
1: Gozo 2: Malta Majjistral 3: Malta Xlokk

Region	Largest city	Area	Population (2005)	Population density	Established	Abolished
Malta Majjistral	Birkirkara	163 km^{2} (63 sq mi)	227,117	1,393/km^{2} (3,610/sq mi)	1993	2009
Malta Xlokk	Żabbar	64 km^{2} (25 sq mi)	140,882	2,201/km^{2} (5,700/sq mi)	1993	2009

== Statistical districts and regions ==
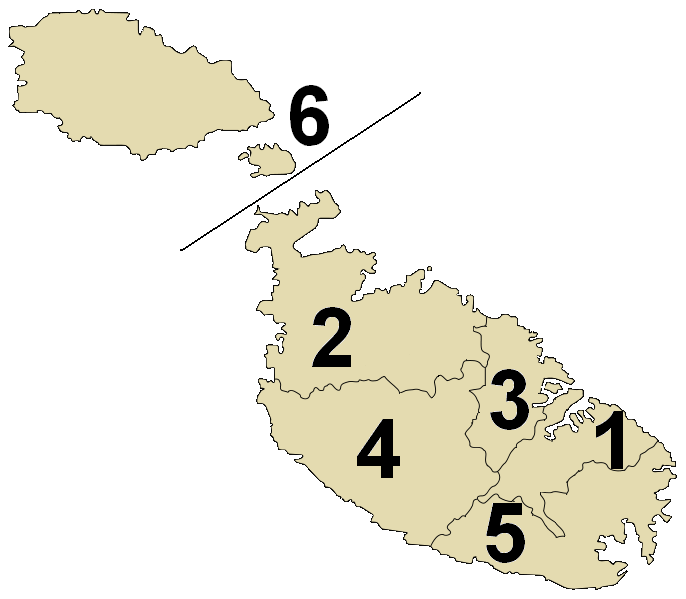
Statistical Districts of Malta: 1: Southern Harbour District 2: Northern District 3: Northern Harbour District 4: Western District 5: South Eastern District 6: Gozo and Comino District

Malta is divided into six districts for statistical purposes, as defined by the National Statistics Office and Eurostat. Each district comprises a number of local councils (LAU2). At the NUTS-3 level, these districts are grouped into two regions: Malta (comprising the first five districts) and Gozo and Comino (comprising the sixth).

Statistical divisions of Malta (EU NUTS and LAU classification)
Level (EU classification)	Meaning / Area type	Number of areas	Code	Name(s)
NUTS – Statistical Regions
NUTS 1	Country	1	MT0	Malta
NUTS 2	Country	1	MT00	Malta
NUTS 3	Islands	2	MT001	Malta (island)
NUTS 3	Islands	2	MT002	Gozo, Comino
LAU – Local Administrative Units
LAU 1	Districts	6	—	Northern Harbour District
LAU 1	Districts	6	—	Southern Harbour District
LAU 1	Districts	6	—	South Eastern District
LAU 1	Districts	6	—	Western District
LAU 1	Districts	6	—	Northern District
LAU 1	Districts	6	—	Gozo and Comino District
LAU 2	Local councils	68	—	—

Historically, the statistical districts were sometimes grouped into three larger statistical regions: Malta Majjistral (comprising the Northern Harbour, Western, and Northern Districts), Malta Xlokk (comprising the Southern Harbour and South Eastern Districts), and Gozo and Comino. This classification is no longer in official use.

=== Southern Harbour District ===
Southern Harbour District

The Southern Harbour District forms part of Malta Xlokk. It contains 14 local councils including the all but western suburbs of the capital Valletta and the small cities Birgu, Cospicua, Senglea and Żabbar. Its largest locality is Żabbar; its smallest, Xgħajra. The District's population is 80,170 (as of 31 December 2016) across its 26.1 km^{2}. Thus it then ranked second-most populous and had the fifth-largest extent.

- Birgu (Vittoriosa) 2,451 population (at end 2016)
- Bormla (Cospicua) 5,147
- Fgura 11,714
- Floriana (Furjana) 1,966
- Senglea (Isla) 2,691
- Kalkara 3,006
- Luqa, include the hamlet of Ħal Farruġ 5,793
- Marsa (both parishes; the Parish of the Holy Trinity and the Parish of Maria Regina) 5,328
- Paola (Raħal Ġdid) (both parishes; the Parish of Christ the King and the Parish of Our Lady of Lourdes) 8,241
- Santa Luċija 2,929
- Tarxien 8,674
- Valletta (the four parishes; the Parish of Our Lady of Porto Salvo, the Parish of Our Lady of Mount Carmel, the Parish of St. Paul's Shipwreck and the Parish of St. Augustine) 5,656
- Xgħajra 1,673
- Żabbar, include the hamlet of St. Peter's 14,901

=== Northern Harbour District ===
Northern Harbour District

The Northern Harbour District forms part of the Central Region. It contains 13 local councils including the city of Qormi, with the largest locality being Birkirkara (pop. 22,314). The smallest one is Ta' Xbiex (pop. 1,657). The population of the District is 131,056 (as of 31 December 2016) across its 24.1 km^{2}. It is the most populous and yet the smallest.

- Birkirkara (include the hamlets of Fleur-de-Lys (Parish of Our Lady of Mount Carmel) and Is-Swatar (Parish of St. George Preca) and the Parish of St. Helen, the Parish of St. Joseph the Worker and the Parish of St. Mary)
- Il-Gżira
- Il-Ħamrun (both parishes; the Parish of St. Gaetano and the Parish of the Immaculate Conception)
- L-Imsida
- Pembroke
- Tal-Pietà (include the hamlet of Guardamangia)
- Ħal Qormi (both parishes; the Parish of St. George and the Parish of St. Sebastian)
- San Ġiljan (include the hamlet of Paceville and the parish area of Balluta Bay)
- San Ġwann (include the hamlet of Il-Kappara)
- Santa Venera
- Tas-Sliema (the five parishes; the Parish of Stella Maris, the Parish of Sacro Cour, the Parish of St. Gregory, the Parish of Jesus of Nazareth and the Parish of Our Lady of Mount Carmel)
- Is-Swieqi (include the hamlet of Madliena)
- Ta' Xbiex

=== South Eastern District ===
South Eastern District

The South Eastern District forms part of Malta Xlokk. It contains 11 local councils including the city of Żejtun, with the largest locality being Marsaskala (pop. 12,281) while the smallest one is Ħal Safi (pop. 2,168). The population of the District is 68,044 (as of 31 December 2016) across its 54.3 km^{2}. It is the fourth-largest district by population and area.

- Birżebbuġa
- Ħal Għaxaq
- Il-Gudja
- Ħal Kirkop
- Marsaskala (Wied il-Għajn)
- Marsaxlokk
- L-Imqabba
- Il-Qrendi
- Ħal Safi
- Iż-Żejtun
- Iż-Żurrieq (include the hamlet of Bubaqra)

=== Western District ===
Western District

The Western District forms part of Malta Majjistral. It contains 10 local councils including the cities of Mdina, Siġġiewi and Żebbuġ, the most populous locality being Żebbuġ (pop. 11,759). The smallest one is Mdina (pop. 229). The population of the District is 59,817 (as of 31 December 2016) across its 72.5 km^{2}. Thus it was the fifth-largest by population and has the second-largest extent.

- Ħ'Attard
- Ħal Balzan
- Ħad-Dingli
- L-Iklin
- Ħal Lija
- L-Imdina
- L-Imtarfa
- Ir-Rabat (include the hamlets of Baħrija and Tal-Virtù)
- Is-Siġġiewi
- Ħaż-Żebbuġ

=== Northern District ===
Northern District

The Northern District forms part of the Northern Region. It contains 6 local councils but no cities, with the largest locality being St. Paul's Bay (pop. 29,843); its smallest is Għargħur (pop. 2,743). The population of the District is 69,467 (as of 31 December 2016) across its 73.6 km^{2}. It is the third most populous and is the largest.

- Ħal Għargħur
- Il-Mellieħa (include the parish area of Manikata)
- L-Imġarr
- Il-Mosta
- In-Naxxar (include the hamlet of Baħar iċ-Ċagħaq)
- San Pawl il-Baħar (include the hamlets of Buġibba, Burmarrad and Qawra)

=== Gozo and Comino District ===
Gozo and Comino District

The Gozo and Comino District is also the Gozo Region. It contains 14 local councils including the city of Victoria (or Rabat). This is also the largest locality (pop. 6,211) while the smallest one is Għasri (pop. 418). The population of the District is 31,879 (as of 31 December 2016) across its 68.7 km^{2}. It is the least populous district and the third biggest.

- Il-Fontana
- Għajnsielem (including Comino)
- L-Għarb
- L-Għasri
- Ta' Kerċem
- Il-Munxar
- In-Nadur
- Il-Qala
- San Lawrenz
- Ta' Sannat
- Ix-Xagħra
- Ix-Xewkija
- Ir-Rabat (Victoria)
- Iż-Żebbuġ

== Electoral districts ==
There are currently 13 Electoral Divisions for the unicameral (single-assembly) parliament. Each consists of a number of localities (although there is no requirement that electoral boundaries follow the boundaries of localities).

Electoral Districts of Malta

=== District 1 ===
- Il-Belt Valletta
- Birkirkara (part of)
- Fleur-De-Lys, Birkirkara
- Il-Furjana
- Il-Ħamrun
- Il-Marsa
- Gwardamanġa
- Santa Venera

=== District 2 ===
- Il-Birgu
- L-Isla
- Bormla
- Ħaż-Żabbar (including St. Peter's)
- Marsaskala (part of)
- Il-Kalkara
- Ix-Xgħajra
- Il-Fgura (Tal-Gallu area)

=== District 3 ===
- Iż-Żejtun
- Ħal Għaxaq
- Marsaskala (part of)
- Marsaxlokk

=== District 4 ===
- Il-Fgura (Mater Boni Consigli and Tal-Liedna areas)
- Il-Gudja
- Paola
- Santa Luċija
- Ħal Tarxien

=== District 5 ===
- Birżebbuġa
- Ħal Kirkop
- L-Imqabba
- Il-Qrendi
- Ħal Safi
- Iż-Żurrieq (including Bubaqra)

=== District 6 ===
- Ħal Luqa
- Ħal Qormi
- Is-Siġġiewi
- Ħal Farruġ, Ħal Luqa

=== District 7 ===
- Ħad-Dingli
- L-Imdina
- L-Imtarfa
- Ir-Rabat (including Il-Baħrija and Tal-Virtù)
- Ħaż-Żebbuġ (Malta)

=== District 8 ===
- Birkirkara (including Fleur-de-Lys and part of Swatar)
- L-Iklin
- Ħal Lija
- Ħal Balzan
- In-Naxxar (part of)

=== District 9 ===
- Ħal Għargħur
- L-Imsida (including part of Swatar)
- Tal-Pietà
- San Ġwann (including Il-Kappara)
- Is-Swieqi (including Tal-Ibraġ and Il-Madliena)
- Ta' Xbiex

=== District 10 ===
- Il-Gżira
- Pembroke
- San Ġiljan (including Paceville)
- Tas-Sliema
- In-Naxxar (San Pawl tat-Tarġa, Birguma, Magħtab and Salina areas)
- Baħar iċ-Ċagħaq

=== District 11 ===
- Ħ'Attard
- Il-Mosta

=== District 12 ===
- L-Imġarr
- Il-Mellieħa (including Il-Manikata)
- San Pawl il-Baħar (including Burmarrad)

=== District 13 ===
This district consists of the islands of Gozo and Comino

- Ir-Rabat (Victoria)
- Il-Fontana
- Għajnsielem (including Comino)
- L-Għarb
- L-Għasri
- Ta' Kerċem (including Santa Luċija)
- Il-Munxar
- Ix-Xlendi
- In-Nadur
- Il-Qala
- San Lawrenz
- Ta' Sannat
- Ix-Xagħra
- Ix-Xewkija
- Iż-Żebbuġ (including Marsalforn)

== Police districts ==
Following the 2022 amendments to the police district's boundaries and compositions, Malta has 2 police regions which fall under the responsibility of 2 distinct Assistant Commissioners. Each of these 2 regions consist of 6 police districts, amounting to a total of 12 districts. Each district is administered by its nominated Superintendent and has its own police headquarters.

=== Region A ===
==== District 1 ====
- Il-Belt Valletta, Archbishop Street
- Il-Furjana, St. Anne Street
- Pinto Police, Valletta Waterfront
- Headquarters in Valletta, the capital city of Malta

==== District 2 ====
- Il-Ħamrun, St. Paul's Square
- Santa Venera, St. Joseph High Road
- Tal-Pietà and Gwardamanġa, St. Luke's Square
- Il-Marsa, Balbi Street
- Headquarters in Ħamrun

==== District 3 ====
- Paola, Valletta Road
- Il-Fgura, Hompesch Road
- Santa Luċija, Tower Promenade
- Ħal Tarxien, Nelson Avenue
- Ħal Luqa and Ħal Farruġ St. Andrew Square
- Headquarters in Paola (Raħal Ġdid)

==== District 4 ====
- Bormla St. Paul's Street
- Il-Birgu, Desain Street
- L-Isla, 4 September Street
- Il-Kalkara, Archbishop Gonzi Square
- Ix-Xgħajra, Church Street
- Ħaż-Żabbar and St. Peter's, Ċawsli Street
- Marsaskala, Żonqor Road
- Headquarters in Bormla (Città Cospicua)

==== District 5 ====
- Iż-Żejtun, Mater Boni Consiglii Street
- Birżebbuġa, Pretty Bay
- Marsaxlokk, Fishermen's Strand
- Il-Gudja, Raymond Caruana Street
- Ħal Għaxaq, Labour Avenue
- L-Imqabba, Parish Street
- Ħal Kirkop, St. Benedict Street
- Ħal Safi, St. Paul's Street
- Iż-Żurrieq and Bubaqra, St. Catherine Street
- Wied iż-Żurrieq
- Il-Qrendi, Church Street
- Headquarters in Iż-Żejtun (Città Beland)

==== District 6 ====
- Ħal Qormi Main Street
- Ħaż-Żebbuġ Parish Street
- Is-Siġġiewi St. Nicholas Square
- Għar Lapsi
- Headquarters in Qormi (Città Pinto)

=== Region B ===
==== District 7 ====
- Tas-Sliema, Rudolph Street
- Il-Gżira, Belvedere Street
- L-Imsida and Ta' Xbiex, Rue d'Argens
- Headquarters in Tas-Sliema

==== District 8 ====
- San Ġiljan, Paceville, and Pembroke, St. George's Road, Spinola Bay
- Is-Swieqi and Il-Madliena, Keffa Street
- San Ġwann and Il-Kappara, Naxxar Road
- Headquarters in San Giljan

==== District 9 ====
- Birkirkara, Fleur-de-Lys and Is-Swatar, Main Street
- Ħal Balzan, Ħal Lija and L-Iklin, Bertu Fenech Square (Balzan)
- Ħ'Attard, Main Street
- Ta' Qali, Pitkalija
- In-Naxxar and Baħar iċ-Ċagħaq, Żenqa Street
- Ħal Għargħur, St. Albert Street
- Headquarters in Birkirkara, the second largest locality in Malta

==== District 10 ====
- Il-Mosta, Constitution Street
- L-Imġarr, Fisher Street
- Ir-Rabat, Il-Baħrija and Tal-Virtù, St. Rita Street
- Ħad-Dingli, Main Street
- L-Imdina, St. Publius Square
- L-Imtarfa, Maltese Regiments Street
- Headquarters in Il-Mosta, the third largest locality in Malta

==== District 11 ====
- San Pawl il-Baħar, Burmarrad and Ix-Xemxija, St. Paul's Street
- Il-Qawra and Buġibba, Tourist Street
- Il-Mellieħa, Parish Square
- Iċ-Ċirkewwa, Ċirkewwa Terminal
- L-Għadira
- Headquarters in San Pawl il-Bahar, the largest locality in Malta

==== District 12 ====
- Kemmuna, Congrave Street
- Il-Fontana, Ta' Mulejja Street
- Għajnsielem, Simirat Street
- L-Għarb, Church Street
- L-Għasri, Saviour Square
- Ta' Kerċem and Santa Luċija, Sarġ Street
- Marsalforn, Marina Street
- Il-Port tal-Imġarr, Coast Road
- Il-Munxar, Munxar Road
- In-Nadur, Saints Peter and Paul Square
- Il-Qala, St. Joseph Street
- Ramla Bay
- San Lawrenz, St. Lawrence Square
- Ta' Sannat, Sannat Road
- Ta' Pinu
- Ix-Xagħra, 8 September Avenue
- Ix-Xewkija, Independence Street
- Ix-Xlendi, St. Andrew Street
- Iż-Żebbuġ, Church Street
- Ir-Rabat, Għawdex (Victoria), Republic Street
- Gozo Fire Brigade
- Headquarters in Ir-Rabat, Għawdex (Victoria), the capital city of Gozo
