= Ħal Farruġ =

Hamlet in Luqa, Malta

Ħal Farruġ Luqa
- Hamlet
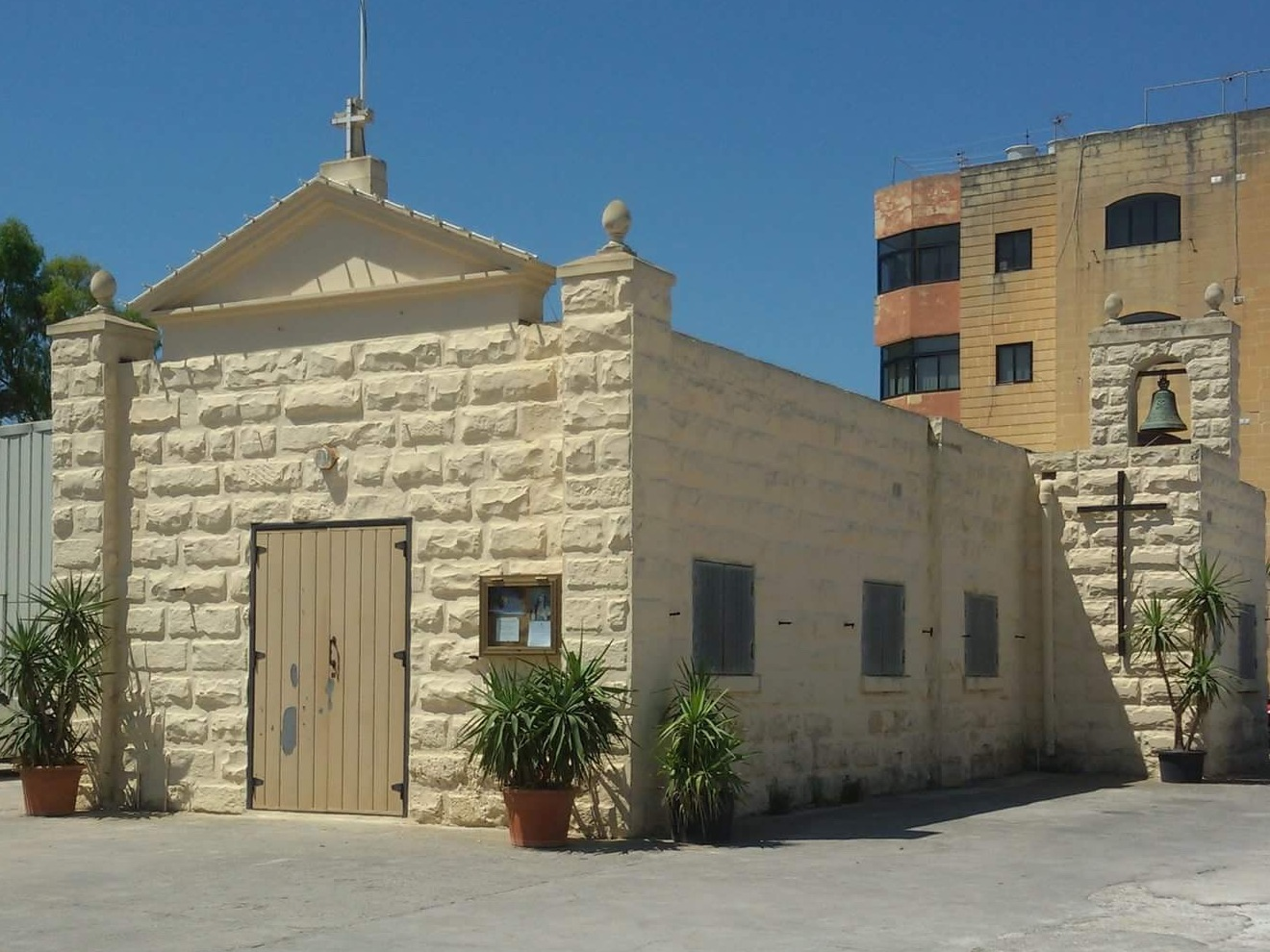
- Chapel at Ħal Farruġ

- Location within Malta
- Coordinates: 35°51′42″N 14°28′20″E
- Country: Malta
- Region: Southern Region
- District: Southern Harbour District
- Local council: Luqa

Area
  - Total: 0.08 km^{2} (0.031 sq mi)
- Highest elevation: 74 m (243 ft)
- Lowest elevation: 67 m (220 ft)
- Demonym: Farrugia

Ħal Farruġ is a hamlet located in the south east of Malta, within the limits of Luqa. Within the hamlet's general area, a total of 24 streets can be found.

The hamlet was run down in 1941 due to the construction of a new airport runway, which is today the major runway in the Malta International Airport.

Ħal Farruġ hosts the headquarters of Polidano Group, Malta's largest construction company. As of Friday, September 2020, the Maltese Government transferred 15,000 square metres (3.7 acres) to the Valletta F.C. to be used as a football pitch.

A COVID-19 swab-test center was opened in March 2020. It is located on the outskirts of the hamlet.
