= Eastern Region, Malta =

Eastern Region Reġjun Lvant
- Region of Malta
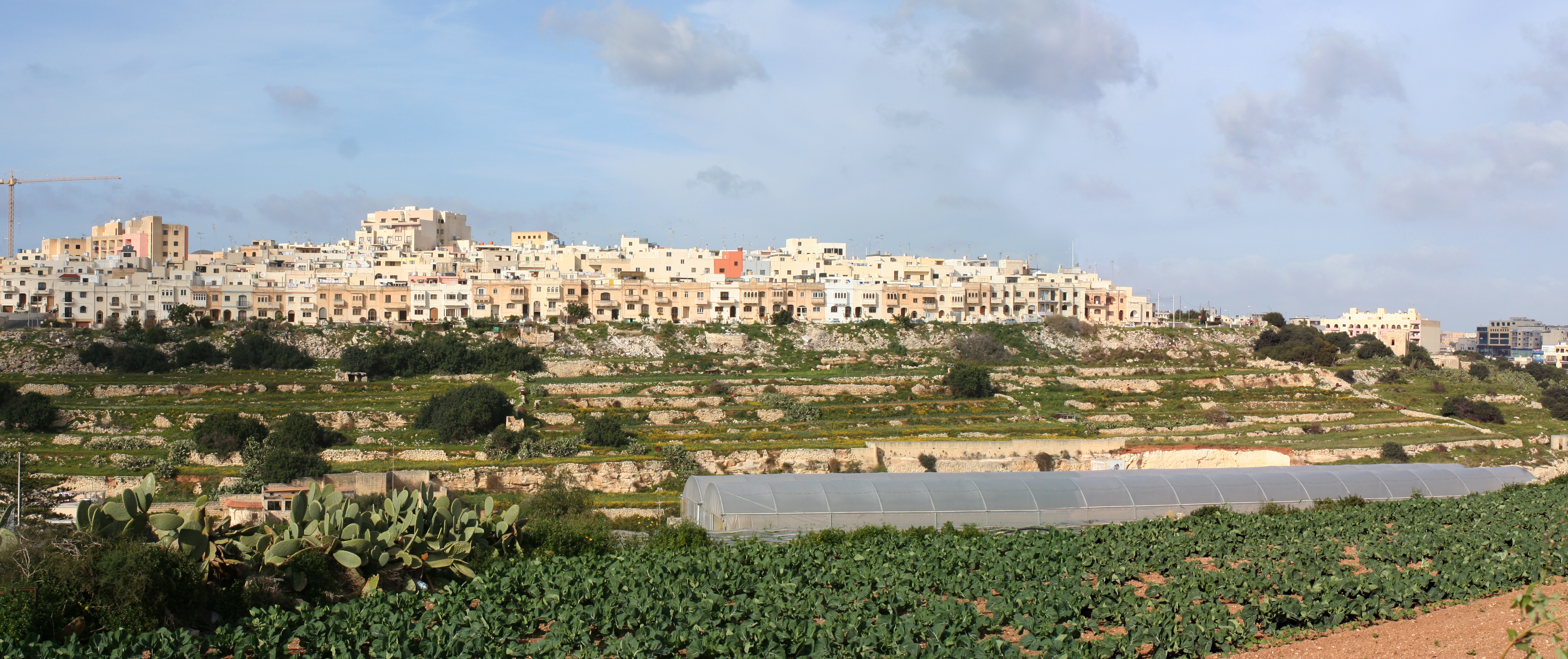
- Swatar in Birkirkara and Msida

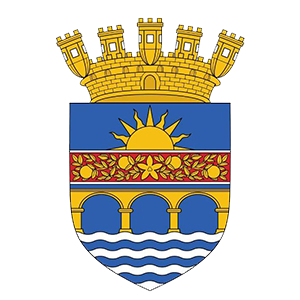
- Coat of arms

- Map of the Eastern Region
- Coordinates: 35°54′42.6″N 14°28′48.2″E
- Country: Malta
- Island: Malta
- Act No. XIV of 2019: 26 April 2019
- Seat: San Ġwann (not part of the region)

Government Regional Council
  - Regional President: Anthony Chircop

Area
  - Total: 20.3 km^{2} (7.8 sq mi)

Population (2021)
  - Total: 115,908
  - Density: 5,710/km^{2} (14,800/sq mi)
- Time zone: UTC+01:00 (CET)
  - Summer (DST): UTC+02:00 (CEST)
- Dialing code: 356
- Local councils: 12
- Website: Official website

The Eastern Region (Maltese: Reġjun Lvant) is one of the six regions of Malta. The region is located in the northeastern part of the main island of Malta. The region borders the Northern, Port and Southern Regions.

It was created by the Act No. XIV of 2019 out of part of the Central Region, and became effective in 2022

== Administrative divisions ==
=== Districts ===
Eastern Region includes parts of the Northern Harbour and Western Districts.

=== Local Councils ===
- Birkirkara
- Għargħur
- Gżira
- Iklin
- Lija
- Msida
- Pembroke
- Pietà
- San Ġiljan
- Sliema
- Swieqi
- Ta’ Xbiex

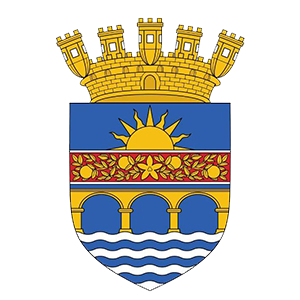
The Eastern Region Coat of Arms
