= Port Region, Malta =

Port Region Reġjun tal-Port
- Region of Malta
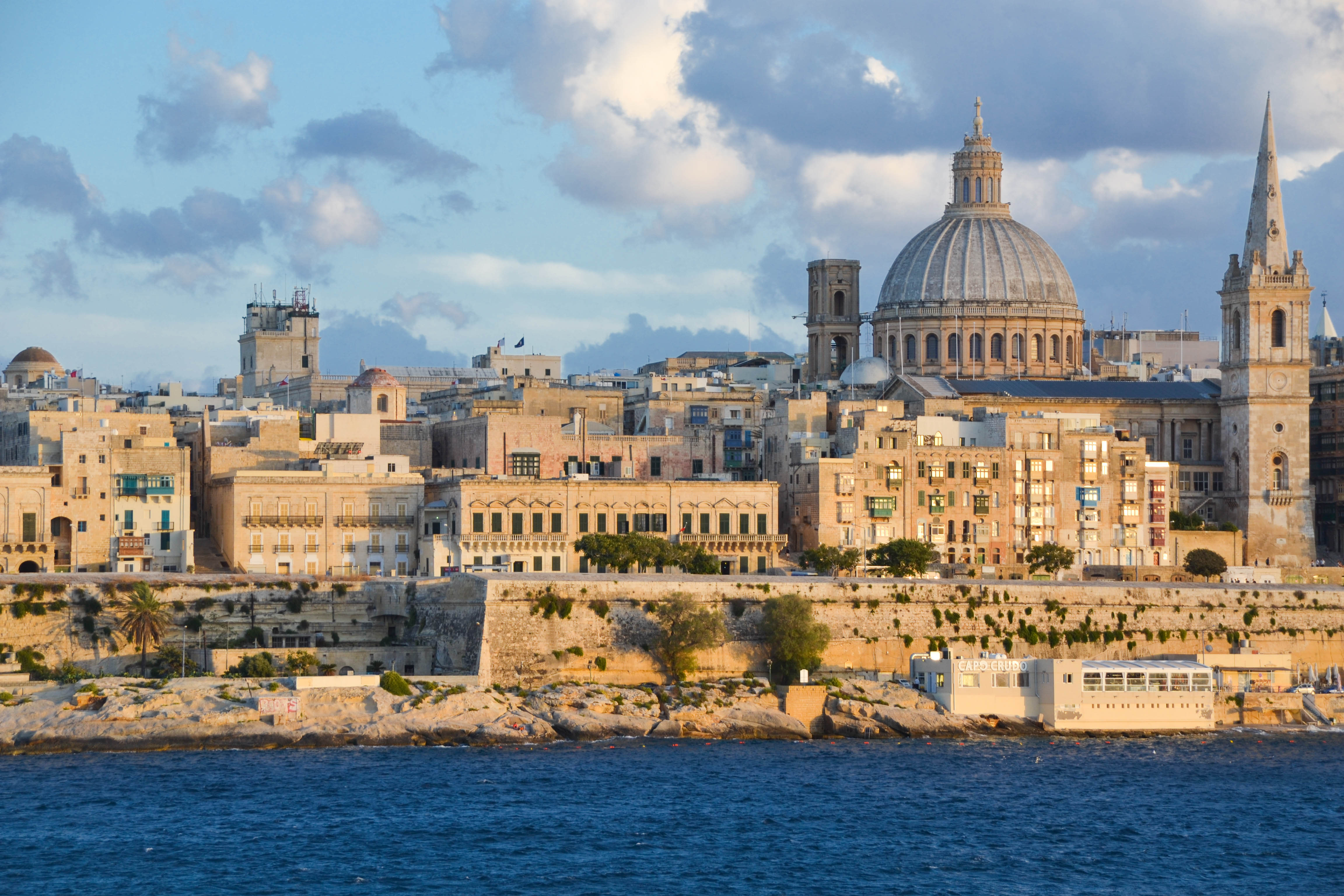
- Valletta

- Coat of arms

- Map of the Port Region
- Coordinates: 35°51′57.2″N 14°30′49.5″E
- Country: Malta
- Island: Malta
- Act No. XIV of 2019: 26 April 2019
- Seat: Tarxien

Government Regional Council
  - Regional President: Paul Farrugia

Area
  - Total: 15.75 km^{2} (6.08 sq mi)

Population (2020)
  - Total: 69,880
  - Density: 4,437/km^{2} (11,490/sq mi)
- Time zone: UTC+01:00 (CET)
  - Summer (DST): UTC+02:00 (CEST)
- Dialing code: 356
- Local councils: 11
- Website: Official Website

The Port Region (Maltese: Reġjun tal-Port) is one of the six regions of Malta. The region is located in the southeastern part of the main island of Malta. The region borders the Eastern and Southern Regions.

It was created by the Act No. XIV of 2019 out of part of the South Eastern Region, and became effective in 2022.

== Administrative divisions ==
=== Districts ===
Port Region includes most of the Southern Harbour district.

=== Local Councils ===
Port Region includes 11 local councils of which six are cities:

==== Cities ====
- Birgu - Città Vittoriosa
- Bormla - Città Cospicua
- Floriana - Città Vilhena
- Senglea / Isla - Città Invicta
- Valletta - Città Umilissima
- Żabbar - Città Hompesch

==== Localities ====
- Fgura
- Kalkara
- Paola - Raħal Ġdid
- Tarxien
- Xgħajra
