= NUTS statistical regions of Malta =

Statistical regions of Malta

NUTS (Nomenclature of Territorial Units for Statistics) subdivides Malta (MT) on 5 levels:

3 NUTS levels and 2 Local Administrative Units

Statistical divisions of Malta (EU NUTS and LAU classification)
Level (EU classification)	Meaning / Area type	Number of areas	Code	Name(s)
NUTS – Statistical Regions
NUTS 1	Country	1	MT0	Malta
NUTS 2	Country	1	MT00	Malta
NUTS 3	Islands	2	MT001	Malta (island)
NUTS 3	Islands	2	MT002	Gozo, Comino
LAU – Local Administrative Units
LAU 1	Districts	6	—	Northern Harbour District
LAU 1	Districts	6	—	Southern Harbour District
LAU 1	Districts	6	—	South Eastern District
LAU 1	Districts	6	—	Western District
LAU 1	Districts	6	—	Northern District
LAU 1	Districts	6	—	Gozo and Comino District
LAU 2	Local councils	68	—	—

== See also ==
- Regions of Malta
- Local Councils of Malta
- ISO 3166-2 codes of Malta

== Sources ==
- Hierarchical list of the Nomenclature of territorial units for statistics - NUTS and the Statistical regions of Europe
- Overview map of EU Countries - NUTS level 1
  - MALTA - NUTS level 2
  - MALTA - NUTS level 2
- Correspondence between the NUTS levels and the national administrative units
- List of current NUTS codes
  - Download current NUTS codes (ODS format)
- Regions of Malta, Statoids.com
