= Malta Xlokk =

Maltese region

Coordinates: 35°51′N 14°30′E

- Region of Malta
- 1993–2009
- Map of Malta Xlokk
- Area
  - 2005: 64 km^{2} (25 sq mi)
- Population
  - 2005: 140,882
- History
  - Local Councils Act: 30 June 1993
  - Act No. XVI of 2009: 30 September 2009
- Political subdivisions: 2 districts 25 local councils
Succeeded by
Southern Region, Malta; South Eastern Region

Malta Xlokk, also known as the South Eastern Region, was a region of Malta between 1993 and 2009. It was located on the main island of Malta, bordering Malta Majjistral. It included the capital Valletta. The name referred to the Sirocco wind, which is Xlokk in Maltese.

The region was created by the Local Councils Act of 30 June 1993, and was integrated into the constitution in 2001. It was abolished by Act No. XVI of 2009, and it was divided into the Southern Region and part of the South Eastern Region.

== Subdivision ==
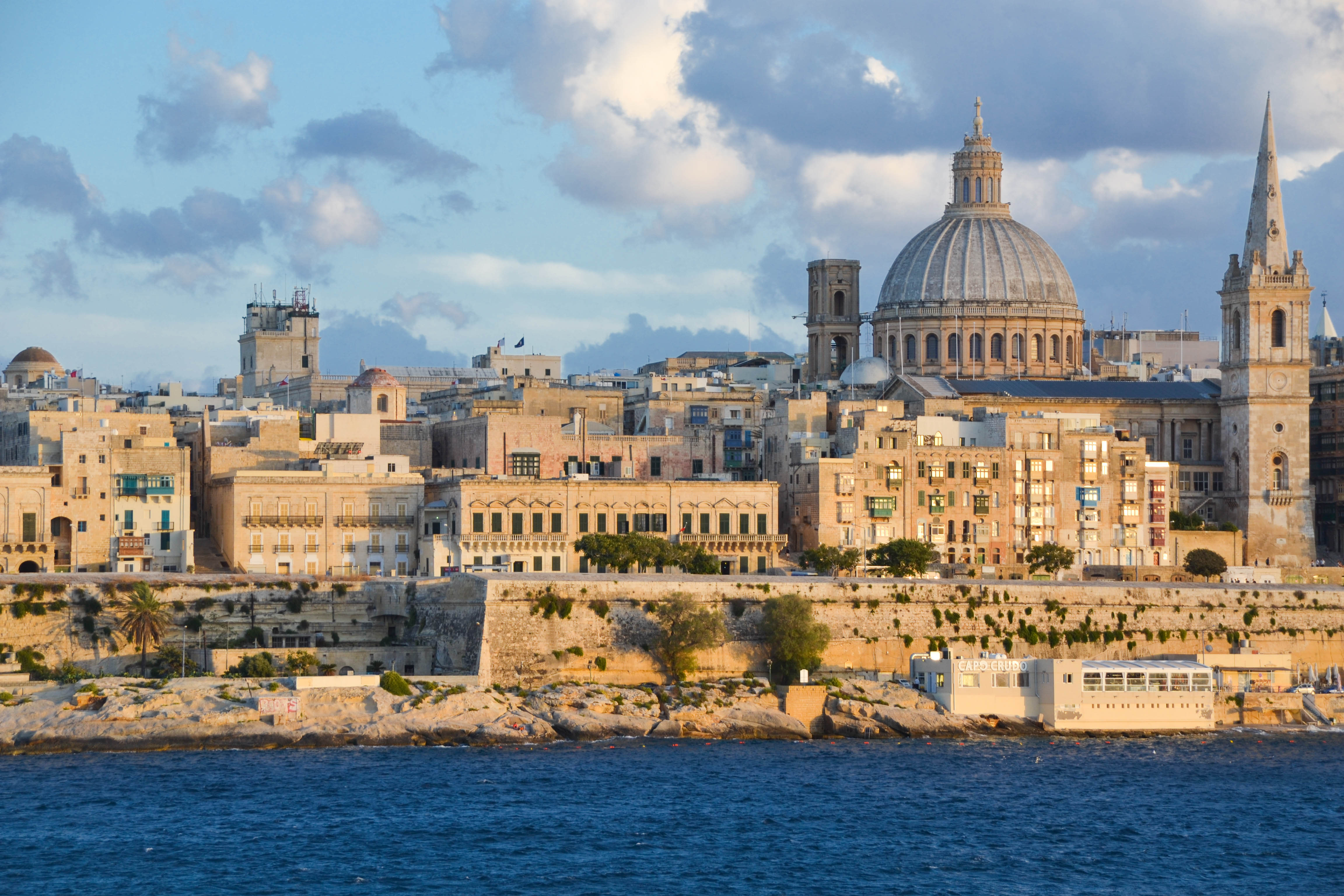
Valletta

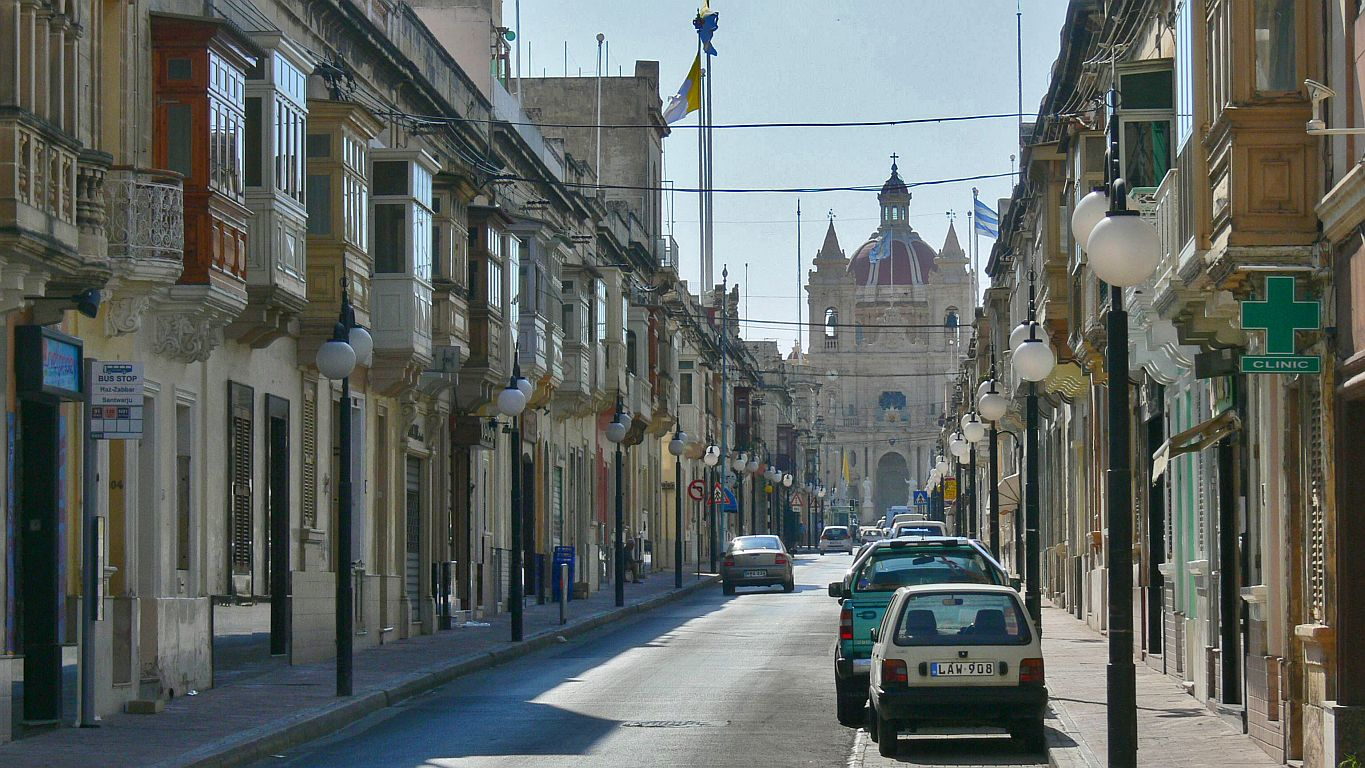
Żabbar

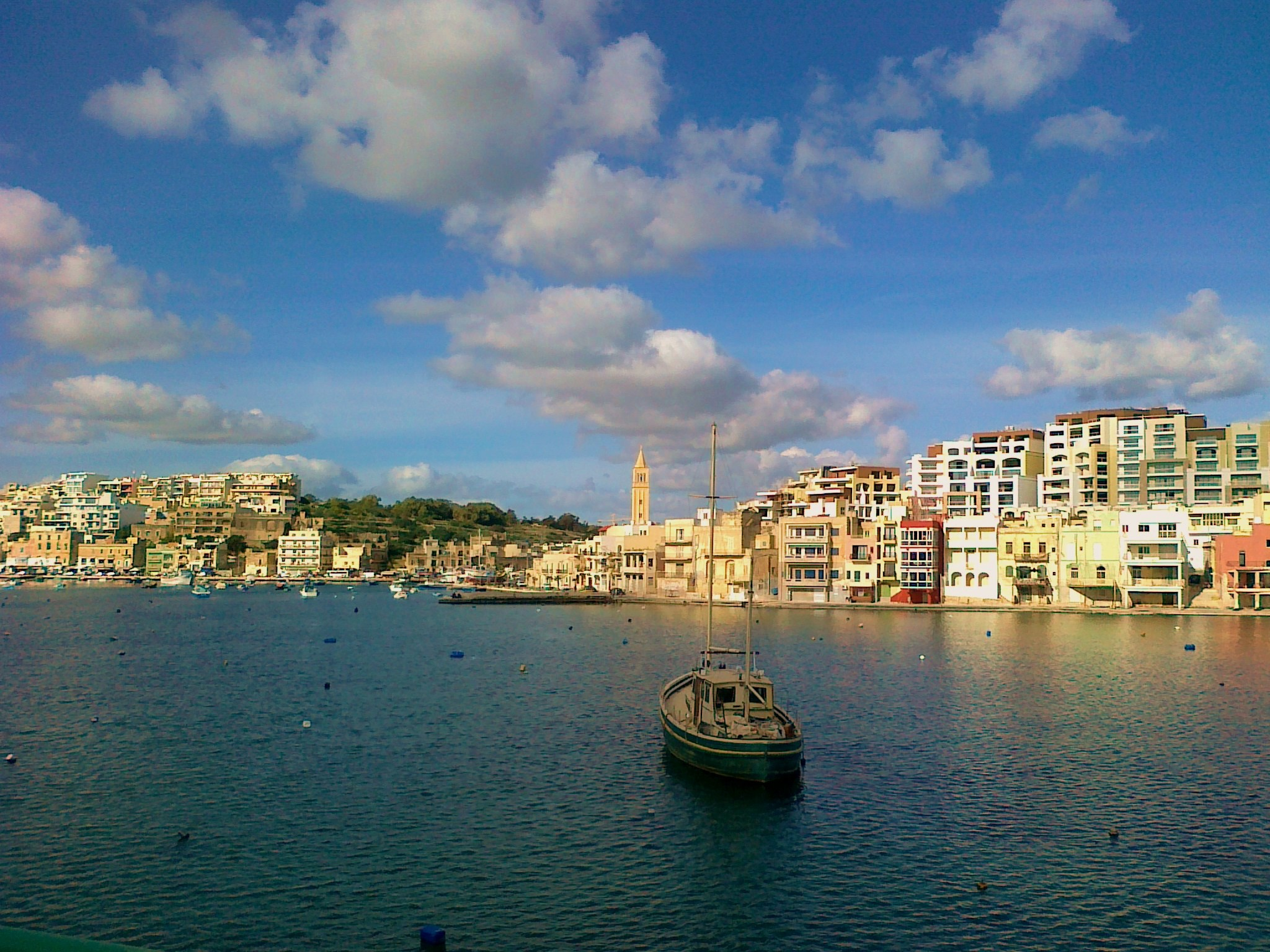
Marsaskala

=== Districts ===
The region included 2 statistical districts:

- South Eastern
- Southern Harbour

=== Local councils ===
Malta Xlokk included 25 local councils:

- Birgu (Città Vittoriosa)
- Birżebbuġa
- Bormla (Città Cospicua)
- Fgura
- Floriana
- Għaxaq
- Gudja
- Senglea (Città Invicta)
- Kalkara
- Kirkop
- Luqa
- Marsa
- Marsaskala (Wied il-Għajn)
- Marsaxlokk
- Mqabba
- Paola (Raħal Ġdid)
- Qrendi
- Safi
- Santa Luċija
- Tarxien
- Valletta (Città Umilissima)
- Xgħajra
- Żabbar (Città Hompesch)
- Żejtun (Città Beland)
- Żurrieq
