= Central Region, Malta =

Central Region
- Region of Malta
- 2009–2019
- Flag Coat of arms
- Map of the Central Region
- Area
  - 2014: 23.6 km^{2} (9.1 sq mi)
- Population
  - 2014: 111,994
- History
  - Act No. XVI of 2009: 30 September 2009
  - Act No. XIV of 2019: 26 April 2019
- Political subdivisions: 13 local councils
Succeeded by
Eastern Region, Malta
Northern Region, Malta
Southern Region, Malta

The Central Region (Maltese: Reġjun Ċentrali) is a former region of Malta. The region included the central part of the main island of Malta, and bordered the Northern, Southern and South Eastern Regions.

It was created by the Act No. XVI of 2009 out of part of Malta Majjistral. Act No. XIV of 2019 replaced the region with Eastern Region, significantly changing its composition

== Administrative divisions ==
=== Districts ===
Central Region included parts of the Northern Harbour and Western Districts.

=== Local councils ===
Central Region included 13 local councils:

- Attard - include the areas of Ħal Warda, Misraħ Kola, Sant'Anton and Ta' Qali.
- Balzan
- Birkirkara - include the areas of Fleur-de-Lys, Swatar, Tal-Qattus, Ta' Paris and Mrieħel.
- Gżira - include the area of Manoel Island
- Iklin
- Lija - include the area of Tal-Mirakli
- Msida - include the areas of Swatar and Tal-Qroqq
- Pietà - include the area of Gwardamanġa
- St. Julian's - include the areas of Paceville, Balluta Bay, St. George's Bay, and Ta' Ġiorni
- San Ġwann - include the areas of Kappara, Mensija, Misraħ Lewża and Ta' Żwejt.
- Santa Venera - include parts of Fleur-de-Lys and Mrieħel
- Sliema - include the areas of Savoy, Tigné, Qui-si-Sana and Fond Għadir
- Ta' Xbiex

== Regional Committee ==
The last Central Regional Committee (Maltese: Kumitat Reġjonali Ċentrali) was made up of:

Office	Officeholder
President	Michael Fenech Adami
Vice President	Stefan Cordina
Members	Margaret Baldacchino Cefai
Members	Trevor Fenech
Members	Joanne Debono Grech
Members	Conrad Borg Manche
Members	Anthony Chircop
Members	Anthony Dalli
Members	Gianluca Falzon
Members	Keith Tanti
Members	Maximillian Zammit
Members	Dr. Angelo Micallef
Clayton Luke Mula
Dr. Dorian Sciberras
Executive Secretary	Jeanette Galea
