= Qala, Malta =

Qala Il-Qala
- Local council
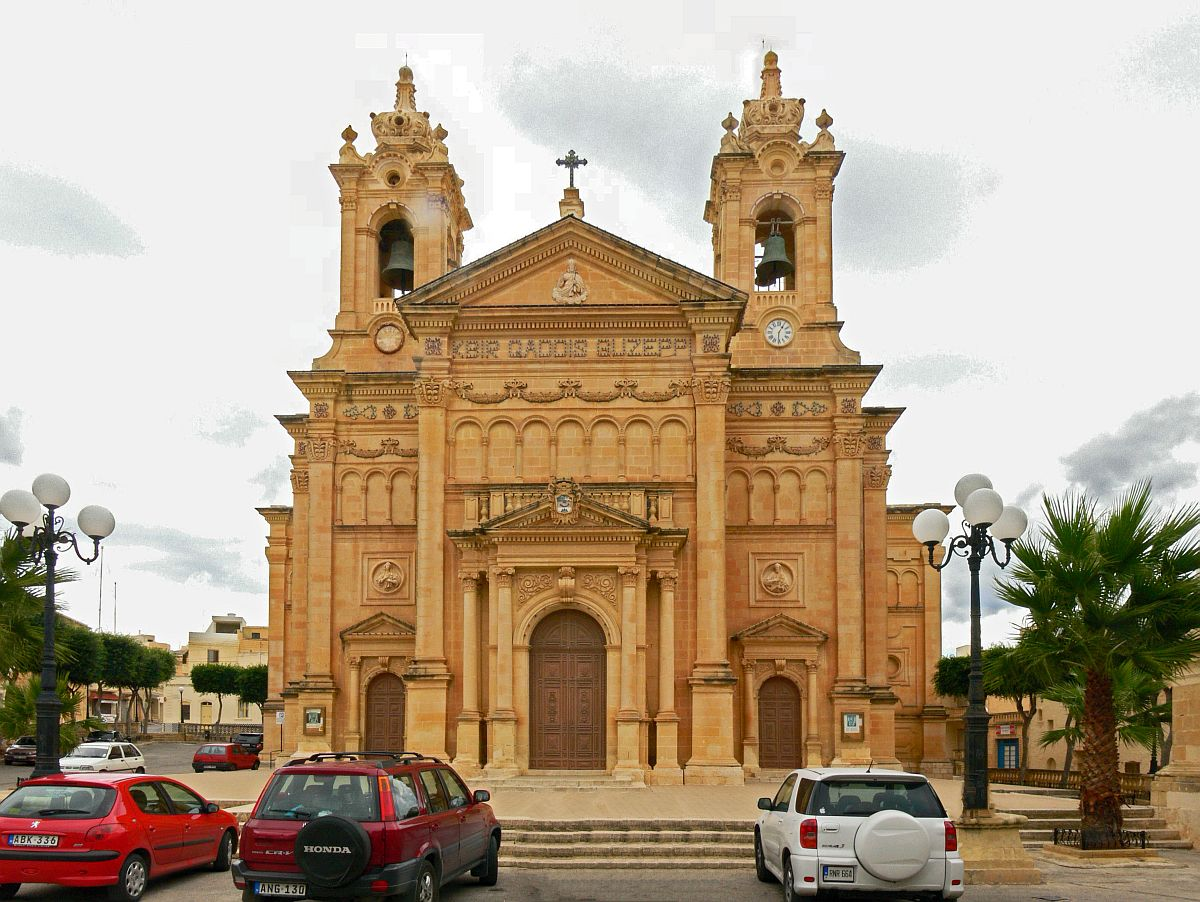
- Qala church

- Flag Coat of arms

- Coordinates: 36°2′7″N 14°18′37″E
- Country: Malta
- Region: Gozo Region
- District: Gozo and Comino District
- Borders: Għajnsielem, Nadur

Government
  - Mayor: Paul Buttigieg (PL)

Area
  - Total: 5.9 km^{2} (2.3 sq mi)

Population (July 2024)
  - Total: 2,352
  - Density: 400/km^{2} (1,000/sq mi)
- Demonym(s): Qali (m), Qalija (f), Qalin (pl)
- Time zone: UTC+1 (CET)
  - Summer (DST): UTC+2 (CEST)
- Postal code: QLA
- Dialing code: 356
- ISO 3166 code: MT-42
- Patron saints: St. Joseph, Immaculate Conception
- Day of festa: First Sunday of August, 8th December
- Website: Official website

Qala (Maltese: Il-Qala) is an administrative unit of Malta, on the island of Gozo. The population of Qala was 2,352 in July 2024. This included 1,212 males and 1,140 females; 1,865 Maltese nationals and 487 foreign nationals. Nearby is Ħondoq ir-Rummien, a coastline with salt pans and caves.

== Etymology ==
The name Qala derives from Siculo-Arabic.

== Qala Council Members ==
Paul Buttigieg (PL) Mayor of Qala, Ivan Cefai (PL) Deputy Mayor of Qala, Joseph Buttigieg (PL), Karl Buttigieg (PN), Valerie Cassar Mejlak (PN),

== About the town ==
Qala is first referred to in a fifteenth-century portolan in the Vatican Library. Its name refers to the qala ('port') of Ħondoq ir-Rummien. It is the easternmost village of Gozo. The development of the present settlement began in the second half of the seventeenth century.

Except for a few sheltered inlets like Ħondoq ir-Rummien, Qala's coastline is largely rugged. Sea caves along the coast include Għar Minka, which is accessible only by boat.

Qala is located at the easternmost point of Gozo, and is the village furthest from the capital Victoria and closest to the rest of the Maltese archipelago. Its name is both Arabic and Maltese for sheltered haven or bay, and its coat of arms is a Gozo boat sailing on rough seas. The village parish church is dedicated to Saint Joseph, and was built by Dun Guzepp Diacono between 1882 and 1889. Its style is baroque like many other churches on the island. Qala became a parish on 3 February 1872, and until 1889 the parish church was that of the Immaculate Conception of Our Lady. The foundation stone of the parish of Saint Joseph was laid on 19 March 1882 and the church consecrated on 8 May 1904.

Sites of historical interest in and around Qala include the salt pans, a well-preserved windmill and prehistoric remains. One can find examples of cart ruts, (parallel tracks cut into the rock) which extend over 180 metres (590 ft) and are some of the longest on Gozo.

== Places of interest ==
=== St. Joseph Parish Church ===
The village parish church is dedicated to St Joseph. It was built by the same architect-priest who built the church of Għasri, Dun Guzepp Diacono, between 1882 and 1889, when he was serving as parish priest of Qala. It is built in baroque, for many churches on the island, whether built in the seventeenth or in the latter half of the twentieth century, were constructed in this style.

Qala became a parish on 3 February 1872, the first to be established after the establishment of the Diocese of Gozo. Until 1889, the seat of the parish church was the church of the Immaculate Conception of Our Lady. The foundation stone of the parish of Saint Joseph was laid on 19 March 1882 and the church was consecrated on 8 May 1904. The parish became Archi-presbyteral on 21 April 1965. The village feast to St. Joseph is celebrated yearly in early August.

=== Immaculate Conception Chapel ===
This Chapel, which is situated in Qala on the way to Ħondoq ir-Rummien, is one of the earliest Marian shrines on the island and dates back to 1575. It is dedicated to the Immaculate Conception of the Virgin Mary. The feast is celebrated on 8 December and the statue was sculptured in Marseilles by Gallard et Fils in 1887.

In the early 1650s, the chapel was enlarged and on 28 April 1688, it began to serve the spiritual needs of the newly established parish in eastern part of Gozo which included Qala, Nadur, Għajnsielem, Mġarr and Comino until the new parish church was constructed according to the wishes of Bishop Davide Cocco Palmeri. It served as a parish church of Qala from February 1872 to February 1889. It was consecrated on 21 May 1950.

Between 1982 and 1988 the inside was gilded and refurbished. The main attraction is the altarpiece, attributed to Federico Barocci di Urbino. It shows God extending his special protection to the Immaculate Conception. The Virgin Mary was crowned on 1 August 1954.

=== St. Anthony's Battery ===
St. Anthony's Battery, also known as Ras il-Qala (Qala Point) Battery, was built between 1731 and 1732. Its design is attributed to Charles François de Mondion. It was intended to guard the mouth of the channel between Gozo and Comino.

The work was originally designed with a semi-circular gun platform and two blockhouses at the rear; however, it was eventually built with a semi-hexagonal front. Consequently, the landward defenses incorporated a free-standing red-an trace with thick walls and numerous musketry loopholes, which were shielded by two flanking traverses. The land front itself was protected by a shallow ditch. A solid blockhouse with battered walls occupied the center of the enclosure. In 1770, St. Anthony's Battery had an armament of three 8-pounder guns with 427 rounds of roundshot and 75 rounds of grapeshot; and eight 6-pounder guns with 127 rounds of roundshot and 45 rounds of grapeshot.

Although most of the landward part of St. Anthony's Battery was in a precarious state of neglect with part of the wall and the entire blockhouse in complete ruins, Din l-Art Ħelwa (a non-profit making organisation) are at present carrying out renovation and reconstruction works on the Block house and the entrance.

=== Ħondoq ir-Rummien ===
Ħondoq ir-Rummien bay can be accessed from the village of Qala and lies opposite to the isle of Comino. The small sandy beach and its crystalline water makes Ħondoq Bay very popular amongst the local population especially in summer.

Apart from an ideal swimming zone, the bay is also renowned for diving, especially for beginners. During summer evenings a number of local families stay late in Ħondoq to relax by their smoking barbecues enjoying the cool summer breeze.

== Voluntary Groups in Qala ==
=== The Qala Fireworks Group ===
The Qala Fireworks Group, formed back in 1956, is made up of volunteers who put on a fireworks show.

=== Għaqda Briju San Ġużepp ===
Għaqda Briju San Ġużepp, founded in July 2007, organises year-round youth activities and works on the Saint Joseph Feast.

=== Qala Saints F.C. ===
Qala Saints F.C. is a football club from the village of Qala in Gozo, Malta. The club was founded in 1968 and is named after the village patron Saint Joseph. They play in the Gozo Football League.

=== Menhir Qala Folk Group ===
The Menhir Qala Folk Group has promoted local culture and folklore since 2003 and has participated in local, national and international events and activities including at in Slovenia, Italy, Serbia, the Czech Republic and Greece, singing and dancing in traditional costumes.

=== Ite Ad Joseph ===
The Ite ad Joseph Band is the official band of the village of Qala and one of eleven bands on the island of Gozo. It has about 35 regular band members and a similar number of music students playing in it. The band has issued two CDs, in 2001 and in 2004, and has played in other Maltese villages as well as in Italy, Greece, and Sweden.

== Events ==
=== St. Joseph Feast (Qala's patron's feast) ===
The feast of Qala on the first Sunday of August is dedicated to the village's patron saint, Saint Joseph, for whom the parish church is named. It was designed by Dun Gużepp Diacono and built between 1882 and 1889. The foundation stone was laid on 19 March 1882 and the church was consecrated on 8 May 1904. The parish became Archipresbyteral in 1965.

Qala celebrated its first feast of St. Joseph on 27 April 1890. The village brass band, called Ite ad Joseph, plays marches and holds concerts during the festival week.

=== Gozo International Celebration ===
An international celebration which is held three times per year; on Christmas, Easter Sunday and on the Feast.

=== International Folk Festival ===
This is a four day festival of traditional local and foreign folk music, song and dance. Performances are given by both local and foreign folk groups and by instrumental and brass bands.

== Qala main roads ==
- Triq il-Belveder (Belveder Road)
- Triq il-Kunċizzjoni (Immaculate Conception Road)
- Triq il-Qala (Qala Road)
- Triq it-28 t'April 1688 (28 April 1688 Street)
- Triq iż-Żewwieqa
- Triq l-Imġarr (Mgarr Road)
- Triq San Ġużepp (St Joseph Road)

=== Other streets at Qala ===
- Daħla il-Klin (Rosemary Lane)
- Daħla il-Wileġ (Open Fields Lane)
- Daħla Ta' Grunju (Grunju Lane)
- Daħla Tal-Ħawli (Tal-Hawli Lane)
- Daħla Tal-Knisja (Church Lane)
- Daħla Wied Biljun (Billion Valley Lane)
- Pjazza l-Isqof Mikiel Buttigieg (Bishop Michael Buttigieg Square)
- Pjazza Repubblika (Republic Square)
- Pjazza San Ġużepp (St. Joseph Square)
- Pjazza San Kerrew (San Kerrew Square)
- Sqaq Ta' Ħatar (Stick Alley)
- Sqaq Tal-Ħalq (Mouth Alley)
- Triq Andar ix-Xagħari (Andar ix-Xaghari Street)
- Triq Federico Barocci (Federico Barocci Street)
- Triq Ħondoq ir-Rummien (Hondoq ir-Rummien Road)
- Triq il-Barbaġann (Barn Owl Street)
- Triq il-Biċċier (Butcher Street)
- Triq il-Forn (Bakery Street)
- Triq il-Fortin Sant' Anton (St. Anthony Fort Street)
- Triq il-Fugass (Fugass Street)
- Triq il-Kalati Puniċi (Kalati Punici Street)
- Triq il-Kappar (Capers Street)
- Triq il-Klin (Rosemary Street)
- Triq il-Mitħna (Windmill Street)
- Triq il-Papa Piju IX (Pope Pius IX Street)
- Triq il-Papa Piju XII (Pope Pius XII Street)
- Triq il-Wardija (Wardija Road)
- Triq il-Wileġ (Daleland Street)
- Triq in-Nadur (Nadur Road)
- Triq ir-Rebħa (Victory Street)
- Triq it-Telgħa (Hill Street)
- Triq it-Tempju (Temple Street)
- Triq l-Indipendenza (Independence Street)
- Triq l-Isqof Mikiel Buttigieg (Bishop Michael Buttigieg Street)
- Triq Lord Strickland (Lord Strickland Street)
- Triq Patri Ġużepp Portelli (Bro. Joseph Portelli Street)
- Triq San Franġisk (St. Frances Street)
- Triq Santa Marija tal-Qala (St. Mary of Qala Street)
- Triq Ta' Cini (Cini Road)
- Triq Ta' Gafan (Gafan Road)
- Triq Ta' Semper (Ta' Semper Road)
- Triq Taċ-Ċawl (Tac-Cawl Road)
- Triq Tal-Maqjel (Pig Sty Street)
- Triq Tal-Qasam (Qasam Road)
- Triq Tas-Salib (Cross Street)
- Triq Tas-Surġent (Sergeant Street)
- Triq Tax-Xulliel (Xulliel Road)
- Triq Taż-Żrieraq (Zurrieq People Street)
- Triq Wied Biljun (Billion Valley Road)
- Triq Wied Simar (Simar Valley Road)

=== Streets at Ta' Kassja Area ===
- Triq Anton Buttigieg (Anton Buttigieg Street)
- Triq Ġanni Vella (John Vella Street)
- Triq il-Barbaġann (Barn Owl Street)
- Triq il-Beata Adeodata Pisani (Blessed Adeodata Pisani Street)
- Triq il-Virgi (Rods Street)
- Triq in-Nigret (Nigret Road)
- Triq it-30 ta' Ottubru, 1948 (30 October 1948 Street)
- Triq l-Isqof Baldassare Cagliares (Bishop Baldassare Cagliares Street)
- Triq Salvu Attard (Saviour Attard Street)
- Triq Ta' Kassja (Ta' Kassja Road)

== Twin towns – sister cities ==
Qala is twinned with:

- Salina, Italy
- Magadan, Russia
