= Żonqor Battery =

- Batterija taż-Żonqor
- Marsaskala, Malta
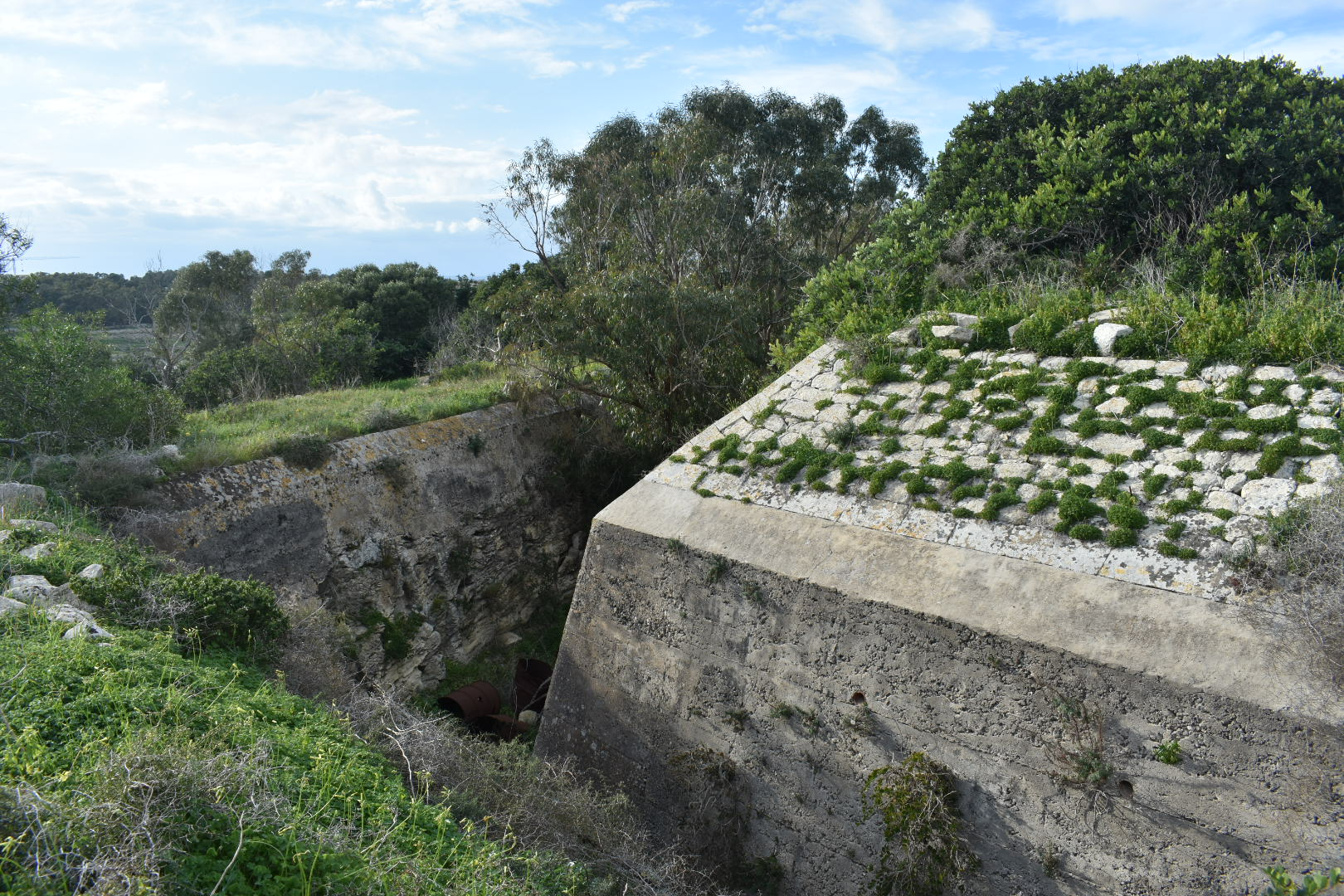
- The battery and its ditch with advanced vegetation

Site information
- Type: Polygonal artillery battery
- Open to the public: No
- Condition: Neglected

Location
- Coordinates: 35°52′5.7″N 14°33′51.4″E

Site history
- Built: 1882–1886
- Built by: British Empire
- Materials: Limestone and Concrete

Żonqor Battery (Maltese: Batterija taż-Żonqor) is an artillery battery in Marsaskala, Malta, standing on high ground overlooking Marsaskala Bay. It is a polygonal fort and was built by the British from 1882 to 1886.

== History ==
Żonqor Battery was built by the British between 1882 and 1886 at a cost of £5000 (or £6000). It has a pentagonal shape, and it is surrounded by a 6 metre wide ditch. The firing positions and ammunition depots were located below ground level to protect them from enemy fire. Its gun crew and garrison were stationed at the nearby Fort Leonardo.

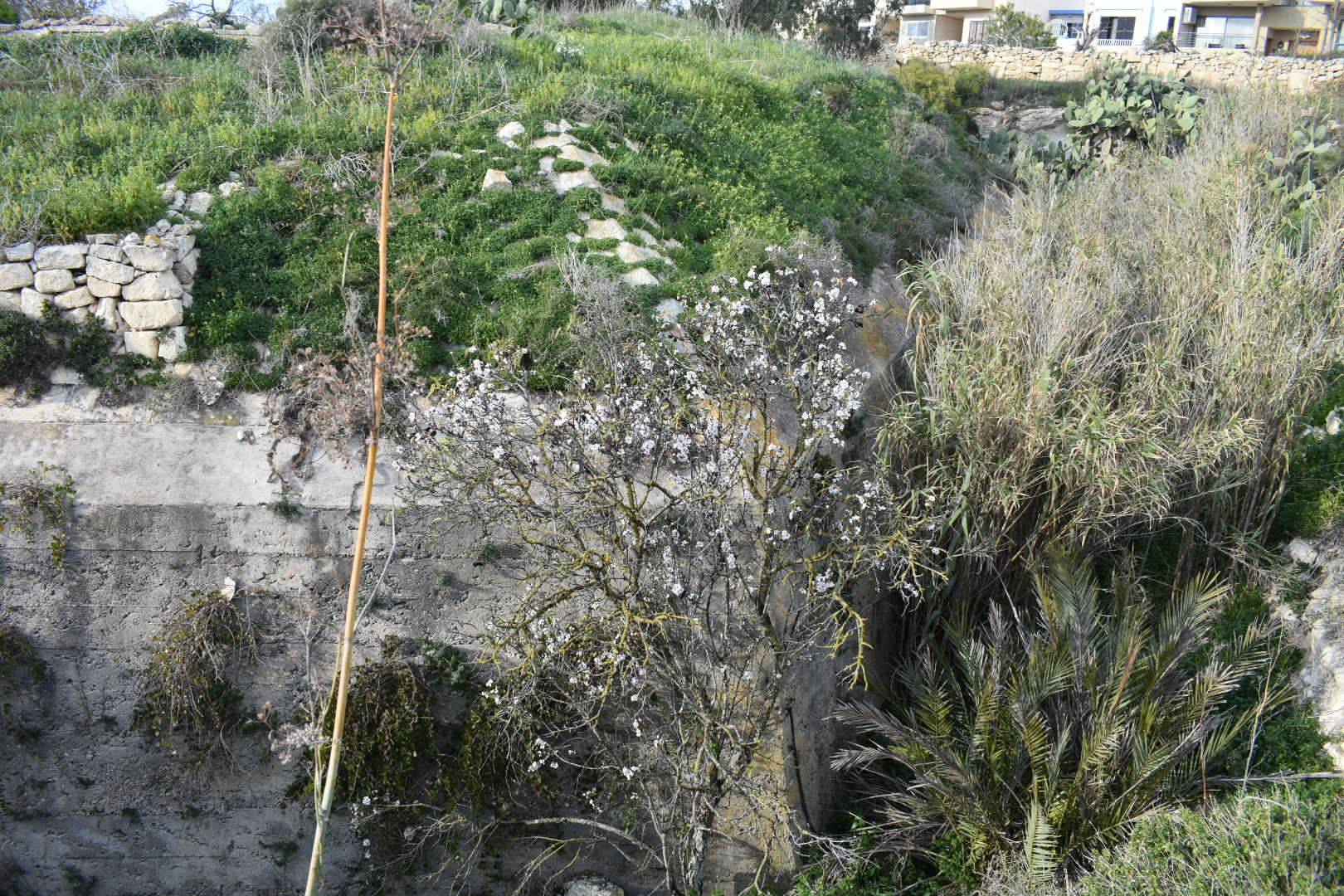
Żonqor Battery with rubble walls

Soon after being completed, the battery was found out to be inadequate since the range of its RML 7 inch guns did not reach the area of the bay they were supposed to defend. Due to this, new plans were made to defend the bay by Governor Lintorn Simmons, but these were never implemented.

The battery is believed to have been armed with three canons, but it is said that they may have never been adjusted into place for use. The battery's guns were eventually dismantled, and in World War II, the battery was used as a warehouse for ammunition.

== Present day ==
The battery is now used for agricultural purposes and it is not open to the public.
