= Ħondoq ir-Rummien =

Coastal region in Gozo, Malta

Coordinates: 36°01′40″N 14°19′19″E

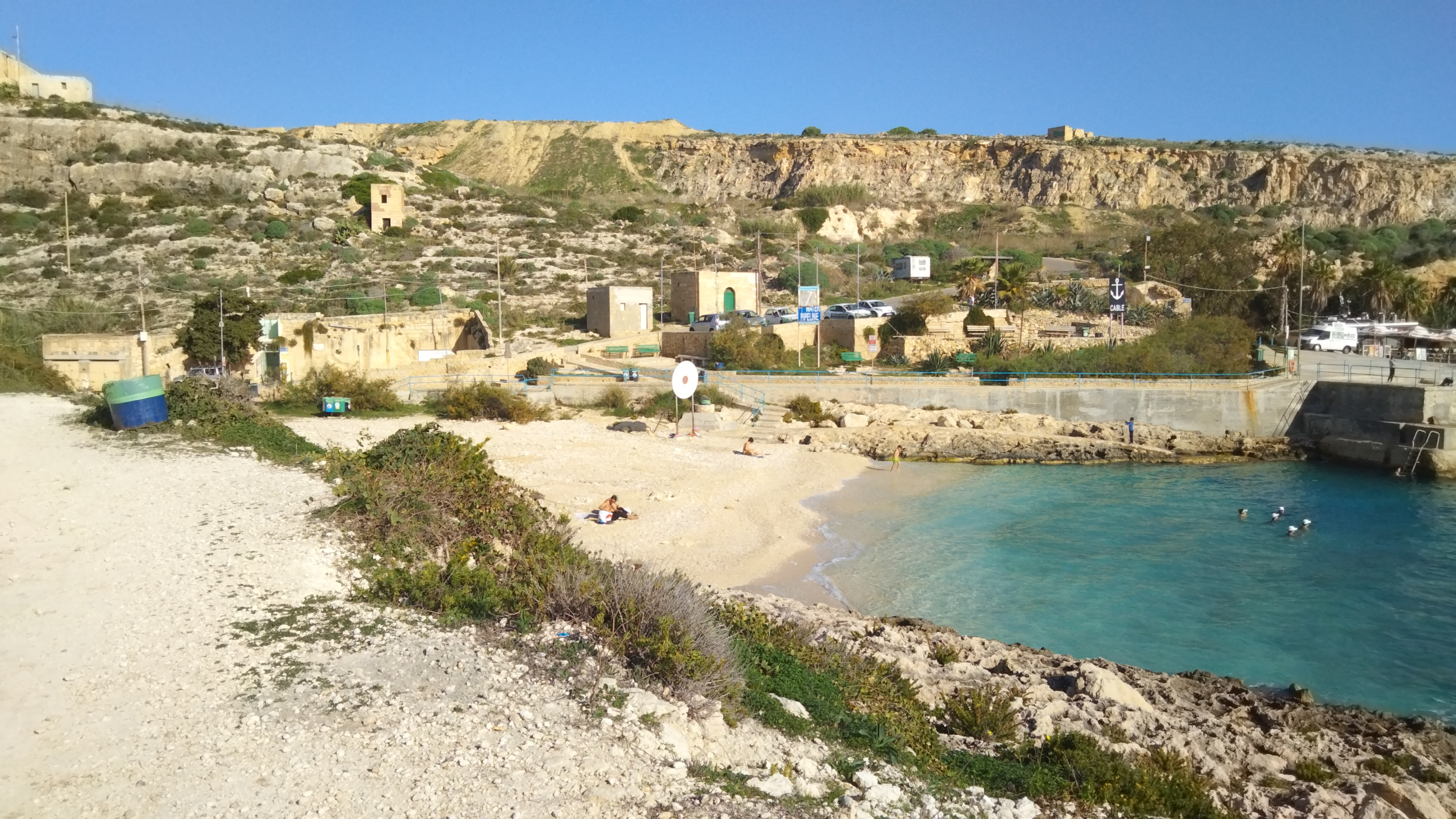

Ħondoq ir-Rummien ("Pomegranate Moat" Maltese pronunciation: [hɔndɔˀ iᵊrːʊmːɪːn], the coastline below the village of Qala, Gozo, Malta is dotted with traditional salt pans, some of which are still actively used to harvest salt throughout the summer months. On this coast is a small cove, Ħondoq ir-Rummien, which is popular among snorkelers due to its deep and clear water as well as the small caves located at sea level. The cove has a view of Comino. A small promontory on the southwest side also shelters a small white sand beach.

== Geography ==
Ħondoq ir-Rummien, a coastal area and bay in Qala, is one of the few remaining tracts of open countryside left in the Maltese Islands. The sea in this area has some of the cleanest and clearest water in all of Malta and Gozo, attracting locals and divers alike. The area is also a habitat for dwindling communities of rare plants.

Ħondoq ir-Rummien, in the area stretching from the depth of the quarry and eastwards along the rocky cliffside, as of 2012, is being threatened by a proposed development plan to build a five star hotel catering for 170 beds, approximately 25 self-catering villas, 60 self-catering units, 200 multi-ownership residences, 731 underground parking spaces, 10 retail units, 5 dining facilities and a marina for between 100 and 150 craft depending on the size of the vessels.

== Human activity ==
At Ħondoq-ir-Rummien, there is a sea-water distillation plant, which was originally constructed there in the 1960s against the will of Gozitans and at significant expense by the Nationalist Party government. The plant was completed only in 2019, thanks to an EU grant.

In the early 2000s, proposals to build a marina were considered by the government. Public opposition to the potential destruction of the coastline halted plans for more than a decade before the plans were denied in 2013.
