= Swieqi =

Swieqi Is-Swieqi Saint Andrew's
- Local council
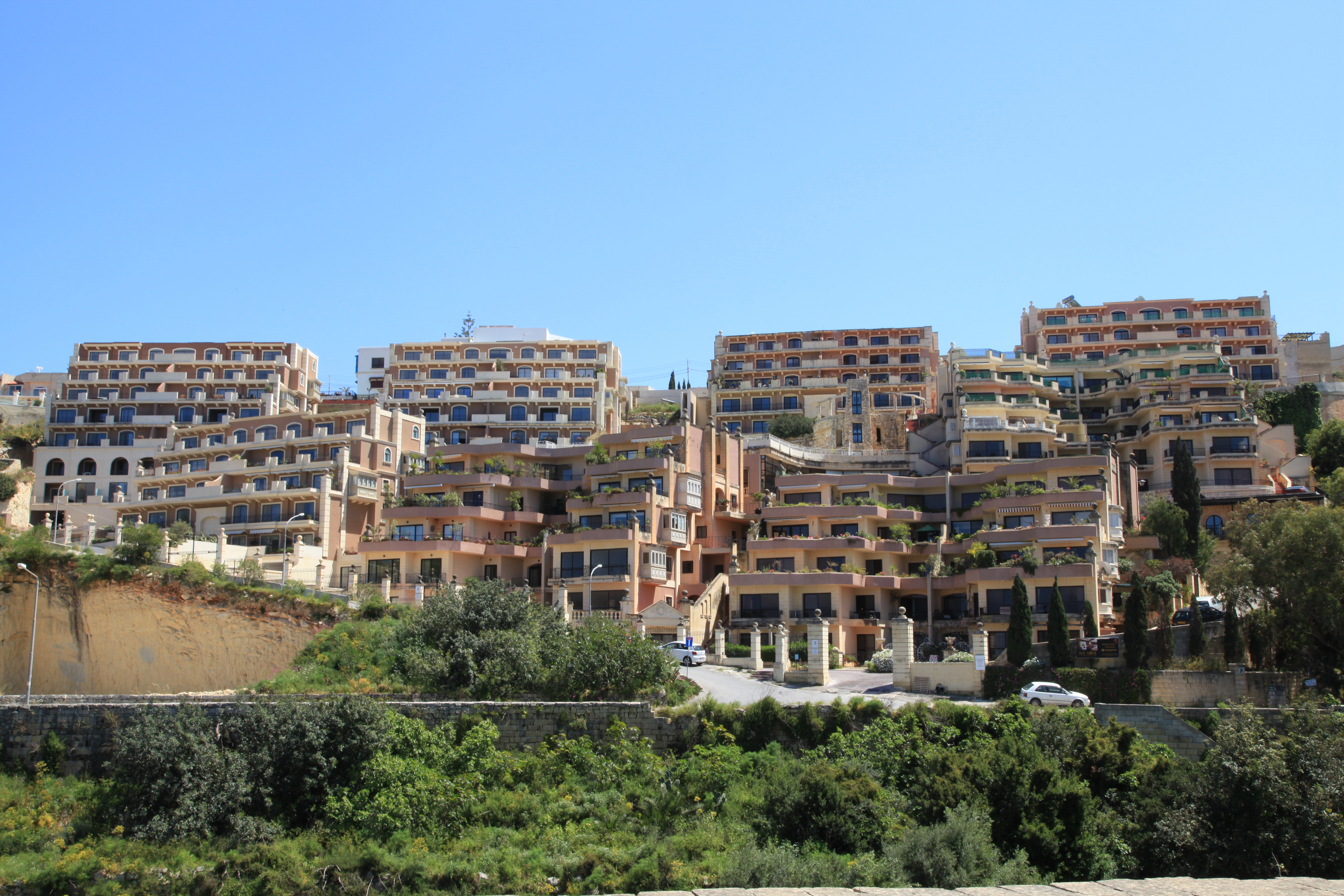
- View of Madliena, part of Swieqi

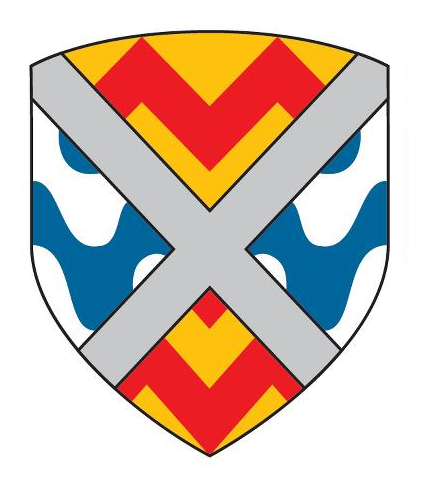
- Flag Coat of arms
- Motto: Reduci ad Pristinum Publicum Statum
- Coordinates: 35°55′15″N 14°28′48″E
- Country: Malta
- Region: Eastern Region
- District: Northern Harbour District
- Borders: Għargħur, Naxxar, Pembroke, San Ġwann, St. Julian's

Government
  - Mayor: Noel Muscat (PN)

Area
  - Total: 3.1 km^{2} (1.2 sq mi)

Population (Jul. 2024)
  - Total: 14,979
  - Density: 4,800/km^{2} (13,000/sq mi)
- Demonym(s): Swieqi (m), Swiqija (f), Swiqin (pl)
- Time zone: UTC+1 (CET)
  - Summer (DST): UTC+2 (CEST)
- Postal code: SWQ
- Dialing code: 356
- ISO 3166 code: MT-57
- Patron saint: Our Lady the Immaculate Conception, Mother of the Church
- Day of festa: 8 December
- Website: Official website

Swieqi (Maltese: Is-Swieqi) is a town in the Eastern Region of Malta. It is a residential area just 15 minutes by bus from Sliema and within walking distance of Malta's nightlife and entertainment centres, Paceville and St. Julian's. As the town developed, residential estates took over farmland. The town's name means "water channels", a reminder of the region's past.

The population of Swieqi was 14,979 in July 2024. This included 7,725 males and 7,254 females; 8,286 Maltese nationals and 6,693 foreign nationals.

== Overview ==
The area's quiet environment and central location have made it popular with the upper-middle/high class population of the island. Vacant property in this area is scarce. Swieqi has seen its population rise over the years. It accommodated 8,099 people as of November 2005; a small number of service industries, IT facilities and English-language schools have taken root.

The municipality of Swieqi comprises Swieqi, Tal-Ibraġ, Madliena and part of St. Andrews. Madliena and St. Andrew's originally formed part of Ħal Għargħur. The hamlet of Madliena owes its origin to the Chapel of St. Mary Magdalen, which was built in the 15th century. Tal-Ibraġ is a newly developed hamlet which, over the past decade, has almost reached its maximum development potential. St. Andrew's is on the outskirts of Swieqi at the border with the locality of Pembroke. The town's coat of arms features a red and gold zig-zag motif indicating the valleys and fields of Tal-Ibraġ, blue waves indicating the watering courses (swieqi in Maltese) and a silver saltire. Madliena is indicated with the red letter M. Swieqi has its own local council, and in 2007 it had its own postal code instated (SWQ....). The town fell under the jurisdiction of St. Julian's, Birkirkara, San Ġwann, Naxxar and Ħal Għargħur at different times in its history.

== Culture and characteristics ==
Swieqi is a predominantly Nationalist-oriented town, and at one time, the PN even polled 85% of the total votes, though it elected Professor Arnold Cassola to its local council, who would also become General Secretary of the Green Party in Europe, and who successfully contested Italian elections. Swieqi is the former hometown of Dolores Cristina, former Minister for Education, Culture, Youth and Sport, Michael Frendo, former Minister for Foreign Affairs, and also Timothy Alden of the Democratic Party. Joe Borg, former Minister for Foreign Affairs and now EU Commissioner for Maritime Affairs and Fisheries also lives here. A twinning agreement has been signed between the Swieqi Local Council and the Council of Taormina. This partnership was signed by the Mayor of Taormina Dott. Mario Bolognari and Swieqi's former mayor, Paul Abela. It is the aim of the Councils to lay out the foundations for a new and profound relationship of friendship and solidarity. The twinning should serve to strengthen the existing links between the Maltese and Sicilian Populations.

In July 2002, eleven youths from Swieqi participated in a youth exchange programme, mainly financed by the European Union's programme YOUTHS. The title of the project was "Intercultural Learning and European Awareness through our traditions". The aims of the exchange were "To create an intercultural awareness for disadvantaged youths in Malta and Ireland, to give Malta and Ireland a better understanding of youths and culture within an EU Country and an applicant country, to create a greater union with the EU and to take a holistic approach with young people from a disadvantaged background". The group visited Galway, the Aran Islands and Connemara, with its partner, Foroige, an Irish youths organization. In April 2004, one month before Malta's membership in the EU on 1 May, 14 youths from Swieqi participated in a Youth Exchange Youth Participation in an Enlarged EU. The partner group was from Kerimaki, Finland. The group was also received by the President of the Republic and the Minister for Tourism and Culture.

Swieqi Day is celebrated on 9 September. In the Middle Ages, when the area of the Swieqi Local Council formed part of the Birkirkara Parish, Swieqi was just a stretch of public land void of any buildings. In the first few twenty years of the 16th century, a certain Augustinu Borg occupied a piece of land in Swieqi, in an area known as Nadur Callel. Apart from occupying this land, Borg also decided to build a house and a garden without a legal permit. Therefore, one could say that the first known inhabitant of Swieqi was an illegal builder called Augustinu Borg! A couple of Birkirkara residents, amongst them Ġorġ Lanza Zarb, could not bear to see public land to be stolen so selfishly. Therefore, they joined forces and filed a lawsuit against Augustinu on 9 September 1527. Justice was not served for six years. On 29 August 1533, the court decided that the plot on which Augustinu Borg built was public land and therefore it ordered that this be classified as 'reduci ad pristinum publicum statum', meaning that the land was to be restored to its original state.

== Sports ==
=== Swieqi United FC ===
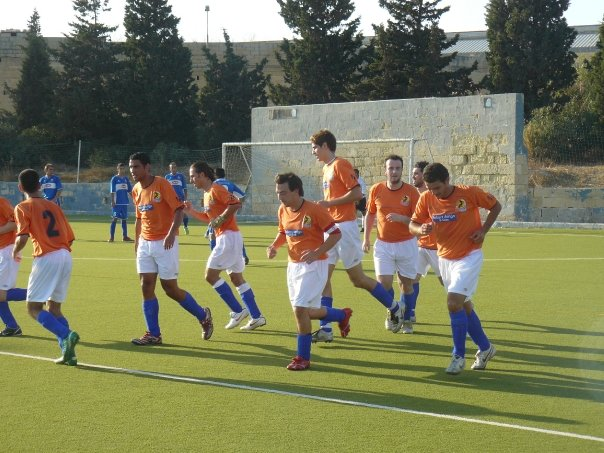
Swieqi United FC

Swieqi is represented by Swieqi United FC in the Maltese BOV First Division. Despite being the oldest organization in the locality, the club is nevertheless one of the youngest football clubs in Malta and its committee is composed of residents of Swieqi. Swieqi United is often referred to as: 'Swieqi's Pride' since the club has successfully exported Swieqi's name across the island and made the locality much more visible on the sporting and international arena.

=== Swieqi Overseas RUFC ===
Swieqi Overseas RUFC is a rugby union football club that plays in the top division of the Maltese rugby league.

Swieqi also has a tennis club in Triq il-Ħemel which offers tennis courses.

== Zones in Is-Swieqi ==
- High Ridge
- Iċ-Ċink
- Il-Ġbejjen
- Madliena
- Slielem tal-Madliena
- Ta' Misraħ Basili
- Ta' Tuta
- Tal-Ibraġ
- Victoria Gardens
- Wied id-Dis
- Wied Mejxu
- St. Andrew's, Malta
- Upper Gardens
- Ta' Stronka
- Tal-Għoqod

== Is-Swieqi Main Roads ==
- Triq il-Qasam
- Triq il-Keffa
- Triq il-Madliena (Madliena Road)
- Triq il-Miżura
- Triq is-Sidra
- Triq is-Swieqi (Swieqi Road)
- Triq Sant' Andrija (St. Andrew's Road)
- Triq Tal-Ibraġ (Tal-Ibrag Road)
- Triq il-Ħemel

== Twin towns – sister cities ==
Swieqi is twinned with:

- Taormina, Italy
- Le Faget, France
