= List of monuments in Dingli =

This is a list of monuments in Dingli, Malta, which are listed on the National Inventory of the Cultural Property of the Maltese Islands., as well as Grade 1 scheduled properties from the Malta Scheduled Property Register maintained by Malta's Planning Authority. The latter are denoted by an ID beginning with the letters MSPR.

== List ==
| Name of object | Location | Coordinates | ID | Photo | Upload |
|---|---|---|---|---|---|
| Niche of St Joseph | 86, Triq il-Kbira | 35°51′41″N 14°23′02″E | 2300 | Niche of St Joseph | Upload Photo |
| Niche of the Immaculate Conception | 2, Triq il-Kunċizzjoni | 35°51′40″N 14°22′59″E | 2301 | Niche of the Immaculate Conception | Upload Photo |
| Niche of the Assumption | Triq il-Paroċċa | 35°51′38″N 14°22′56″E | 2302 | Niche of the Assumption | Upload Photo |
| Niche of the Assumption | 17, Triq il-Paroċċa | 35°51′38″N 14°22′56″E | 2303 | Niche of the Assumption | Upload Photo |
| Relief of the Nativity | 27, Triq il-Paroċċa | 35°51′38″N 14°22′56″E | 2304 | Relief of the Nativity | Upload Photo |
| Parish Church of the Assumption | Triq il-Paroċċa | 35°51′38″N 14°22′54″E | 2305 | Parish Church of the Assumption | Upload Photo |
| Niche of St Paul | "San Pawl", 4, Triq il-Kbira | 35°51′33″N 14°22′54″E | 2306 | Niche of St Paul | Upload Photo |
| Chapel of Our Lady of Sorrows | Triq it-Turretta / Triq il-Maddalena | 35°51′29″N 14°22′52″E | 2307 | Chapel of Our Lady of Sorrows | Upload Photo |
| Chapel of Mary Magdalene | Triq Ħal-Tartarni | 35°51′06″N 14°23′08″E | 2308 | Chapel of Mary Magdalene | Upload Photo |
| Niche of the Madonna and Child / Lady of Mount Carmel | Triq il-Maddalena | 35°51′26″N 14°23′00″E | 2309 | Niche of the Madonna and Child / Lady of Mount Carmel | Upload Photo |
| Niche of the Assumption | 57, Triq il-Kbira (Police Station) | 35°51′39″N 14°22′58″E | 2310 | Niche of the Assumption | Upload Photo |
| Niche of St. Lucy | Triq il-Gvernatur William Reid / Triq Carmelo Bugeja | 35°51′40″N 14°22′39″E | 2311 | Niche of St. Lucy | Upload Photo |
| Niche of St Paul | Triq San Pawl tal-Pitkali ("Pitkal" bus stop) | 35°51′38″N 14°22′20″E | 2312 | Niche of St Paul | Upload Photo |
| Chapel of Sta. Domenica | Triq il-Għajn | 35°51′48″N 14°23′05″E | 2313 | Chapel of Sta. Domenica | Upload Photo |
| Dejr il-Bniet Complex: Nymphaeum | Triq Rill | | MSPR0072 | Dejr il-Bniet Complex: Nymphaeum | Upload Photo |
