= Verdala =

Verdala may refer to:

- Hugues Loubenx de Verdalle (1531–1595), Grand Master of the Order of St. John
- Verdala Palace, a palace in Siġġiewi, Malta
- Fort Verdala, a fort in Cospicua, Malta
- Verdala International School, a school in Pembroke, Malta
