= Il-Kullana to tal-Ġifen Cliffs Important Bird Area =

Conservation area in Malta

Coordinates: 35°50′N 14°24′E

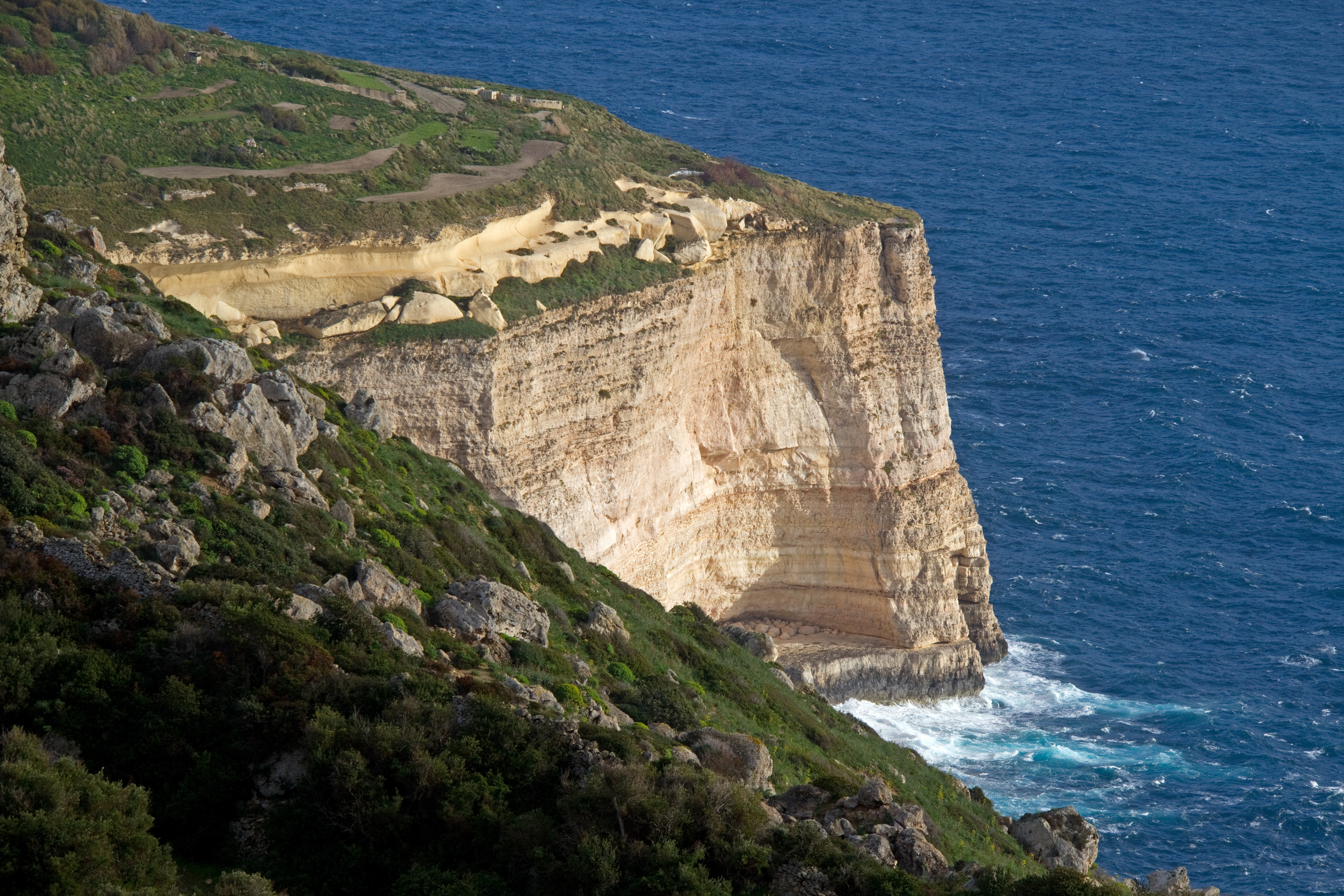
The Dingli Cliffs, which form part of the IBA

The Il-Kullana to tal-Ġifen Cliffs Important Bird Area comprises a 47 ha linear strip of cliffed coastline on the southern coast of Malta, in the Mediterranean Sea. The cliffs lie within the limits of Rabat, Dingli and Siġġiewi, and include the Dingli Cliffs. The steep and rugged cliffs rise from sea level to a height of over 100 m. It was identified as an Important Bird Area (IBA) by BirdLife International because it supports 500–1000 breeding pairs of Cory's shearwaters and 100–200 pairs of yelkouan shearwaters.

== See also ==
- List of birds of Malta
