= Saint Kyriaki =

Greek saint (died 289 CE)

Saint Kyriaki of Nicomedia
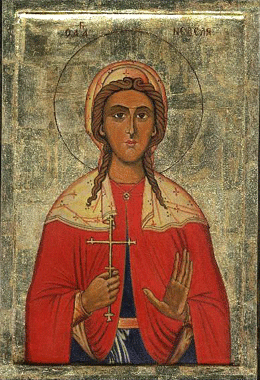
- A 19th century Bulgarian Orthodox icon of Saint Kyriaki

Great-Martyr
- Born: Nicomedia (modern-day İzmit, Kocaeli, Turkey)
- Died: 289 A.D. Chalcedon (modern-day Kadıköy, Istanbul, Turkey)
- Venerated in: Eastern Orthodox Church; Roman Catholic Church
- Major shrine: Church of St Kyriaki, Istanbul
- Feast: 7 July
- Patronage: patron of Servia, Greece

Saint Kyriaki (Greek: Αγία Κυριακή, romanized: Agiá Kyriakí; Macedonian: Света Недела, romanized: Sveta Nedela), also known as Saint Kyriaki the Great Martyr (Greek: Αγία Κυριακή η Μεγαλομάρτυς, romanized: Agiá Kyriakí I Megalomártys; Macedonian: Света великомаченичка Недела, romanized: Sveta velikomachenichka Nedela), is a Christian saint who was martyred under the Roman emperor Diocletian. In Catholic tradition, her name, with meaning of 'Holy Sunday', is translated as Saint Dominica..

== Life ==
Kyriaki was born in Nicomedia to Greek parents Dorotheus and Eusebia. They were devout Christians, and when they had a child, since she was born on Sunday, the Lord's Day, she was given the name Kyriaki, the Greek word for Sunday.

From her childhood, Kyriaki consecrated herself to God. As she was a beautiful young woman, many suitors asked for her hand in marriage, but she refused them all saying that she had dedicated herself to Jesus Christ. A magistrate of Nicomedia also wished to betroth Kyriaki to his son, especially since she came from a wealthy family, but when she once more rejected his proposal, he denounced Kyriaki and her parents as Christians to Emperor Diocletian.

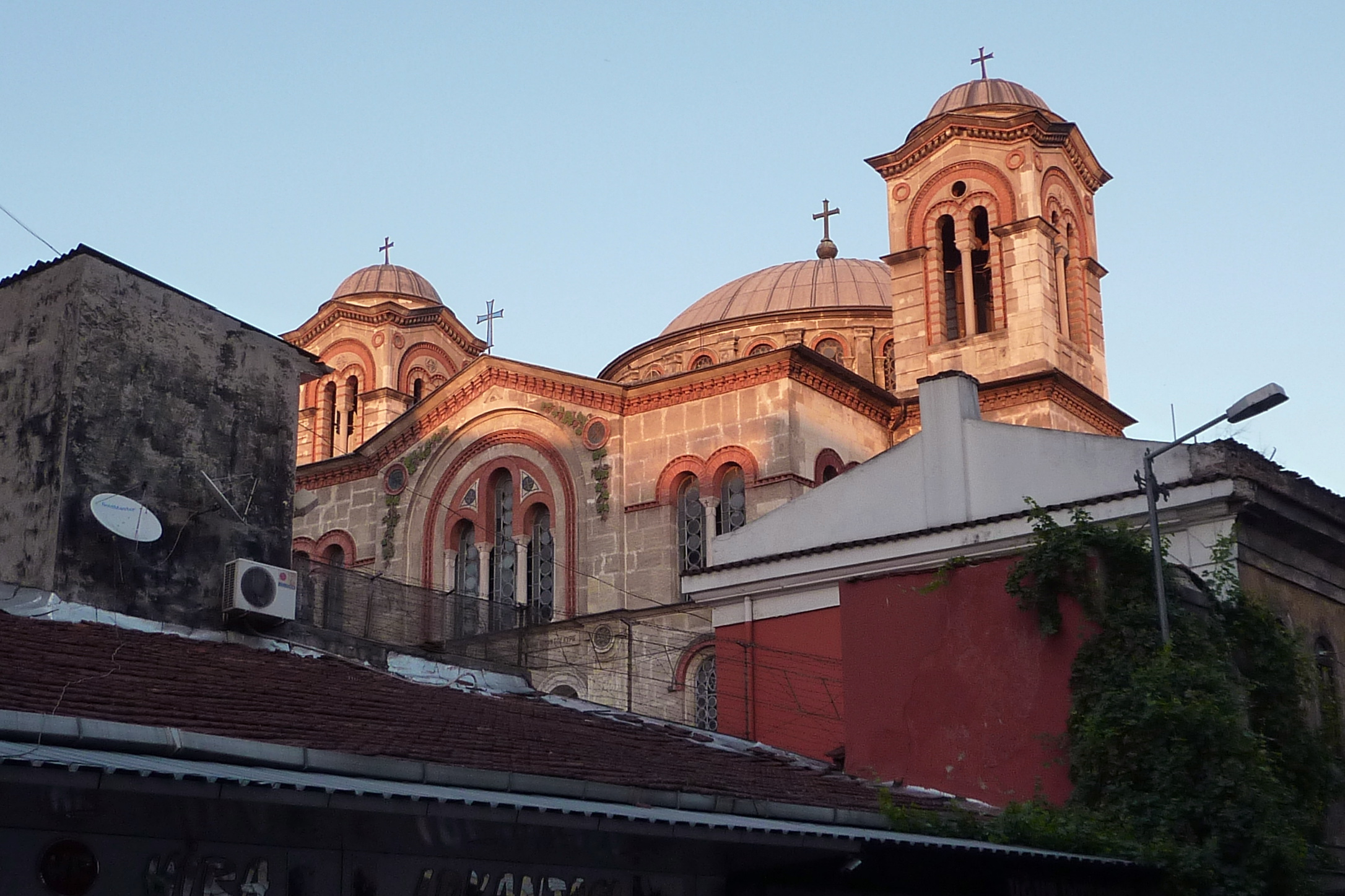
The Church of St. Kyriaki in Istanbul, Turkey

Diocletian ordered the family to be arrested and upon their refusal to honour the pagan gods, Dorotheus was beaten. Since this had no effect, Dorotheus and Eusebia were exiled to Melitene in eastern Anatolia. Kyriaki was sent to Nicomedia to be interrogated by his co-ruler, Maximian. When Kyriaki refused to renounce her faith, Maximian ordered that she be whipped. Since Maximian failed to persuade the young woman to change her faith, he sent her to Hilarion, the eparch of Bithynia in Chalcedon, either to convert Kyriaki to paganism, or send her back to him.

Hilarion tried his best with promises and threats, but when all these proved ineffective, he ordered her tortured. Kyriaki was suspended by her hair for several hours, while soldiers burned her body with torches. She was finally taken down and thrown into a prison cell. During the night, Christ appeared to her and healed her wounds. The next day, Hilarion announced that the gods had healed her out of pity and urged her to go to the temple and give thanks to them. When she was brought to the pagan temple, Kyriaki prayed that God would destroy the idols and a sudden earthquake toppled the idols and shattered them to pieces. Hilarion blasphemed God and was struck by lightning and died on the spot.

Kyriaki was tortured again by Apollonius, the successor of Hilarion. She was thrown into a fire, but the flames were extinguished, and then to wild beasts, but they became tame and gentle. Apollonius then sentenced her to death by the sword. As she was given a little time to pray, she asked God to receive her soul and to remember those who honoured her martyrdom. Upon completing her prayer, she rendered her soul to God before the sword was lowered on her head. Pious Christians took her relics and buried them. At the time of her death, she was 21 years old.

== Veneration ==
Her feast day is celebrated on 7 July by the Eastern Orthodox Church.

In honor of Saint Kyriaki, several settlements in Greece bear the name Agia Kyriaki (Greek: Αγία Κυριακή, Agía Kyriakí), as well as an island of the same name in the Dodecanese. Saint Kyriaki is the patron saint of Servia, a town in Western Macedonia, Greece.

== Hymn ==
A troparion dedicated to Saint Kyriaki is sung in the fifth Byzantine tone:

O virgin martyr Kyriaki,
You were a worthy sacrifice
When you offered your pure soul to God;
Wherefore Christ has glorified you,
And through you pours forth graces abundantly on all the faithful,
For He is the merciful Loving God!

== Gallery ==
=== In art ===
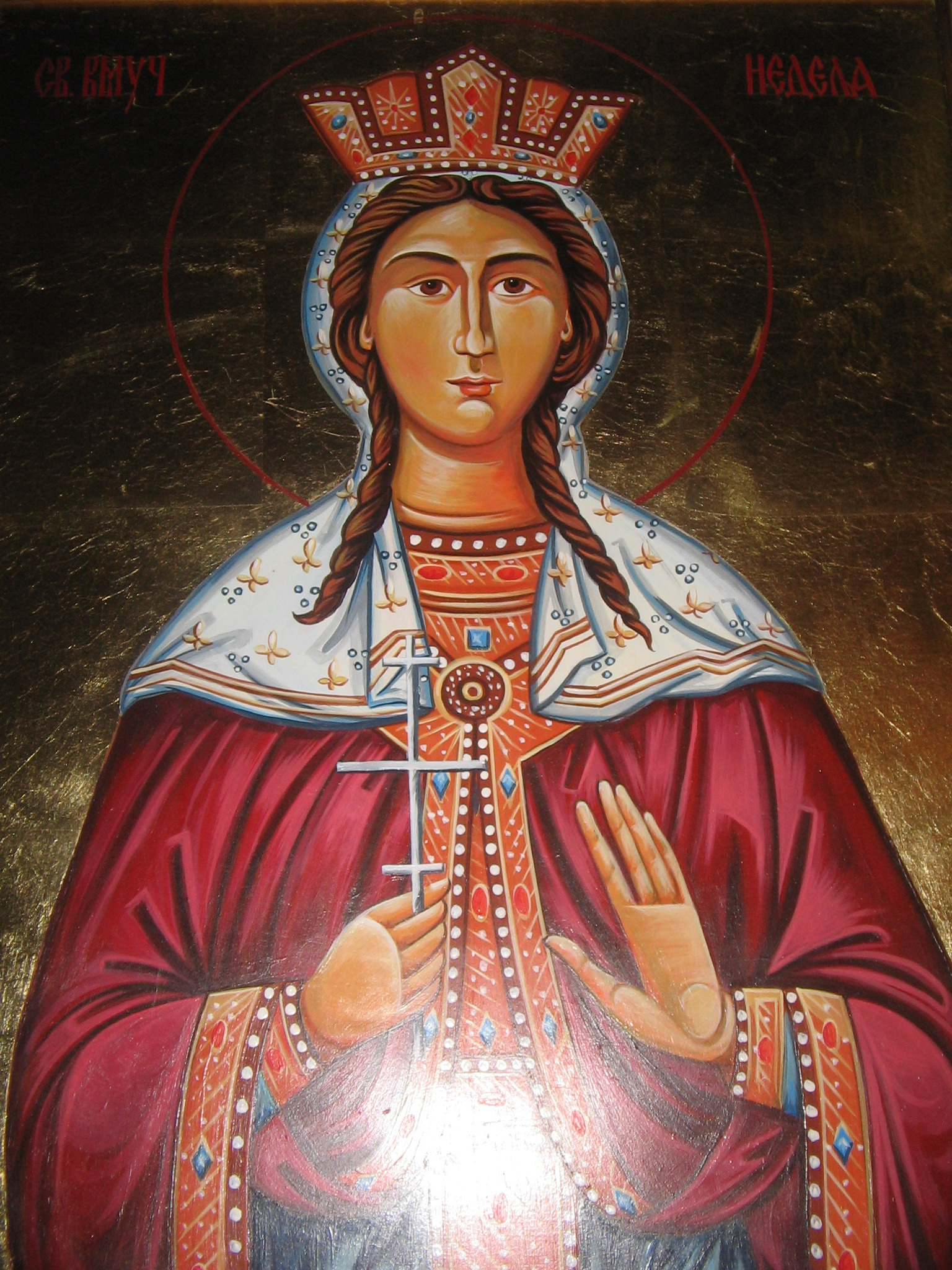
A Serbian Orthodox icon at the Old Church of St. Nicholas in Javorani, Bosnia and Herzegovina

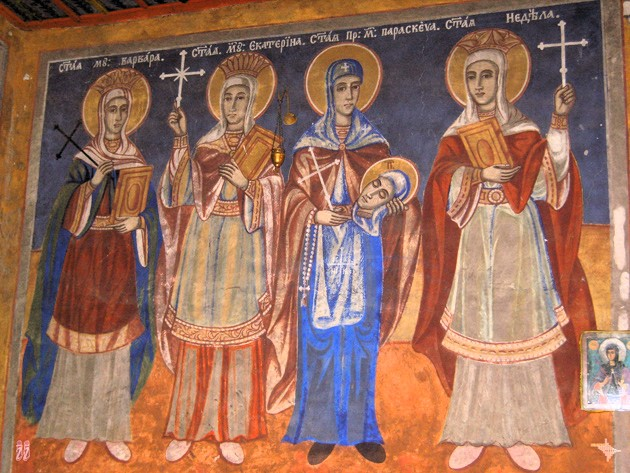
A 15th century fresco depicting Saint Kyriaki (Nedela) on the right in Pobožje, North Macedonia

=== Churches ===
Some of the churches dedicated to Saint Kyriaki.

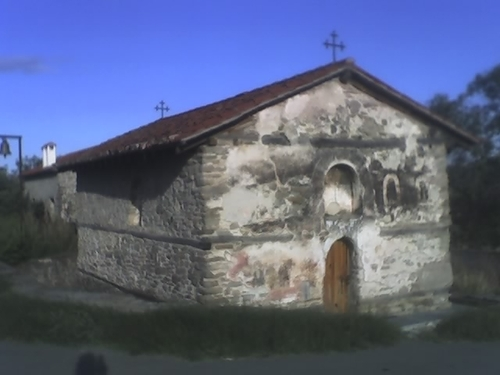
The Church of Agia Kyriaki in Mavronoros, Grevena, Greece

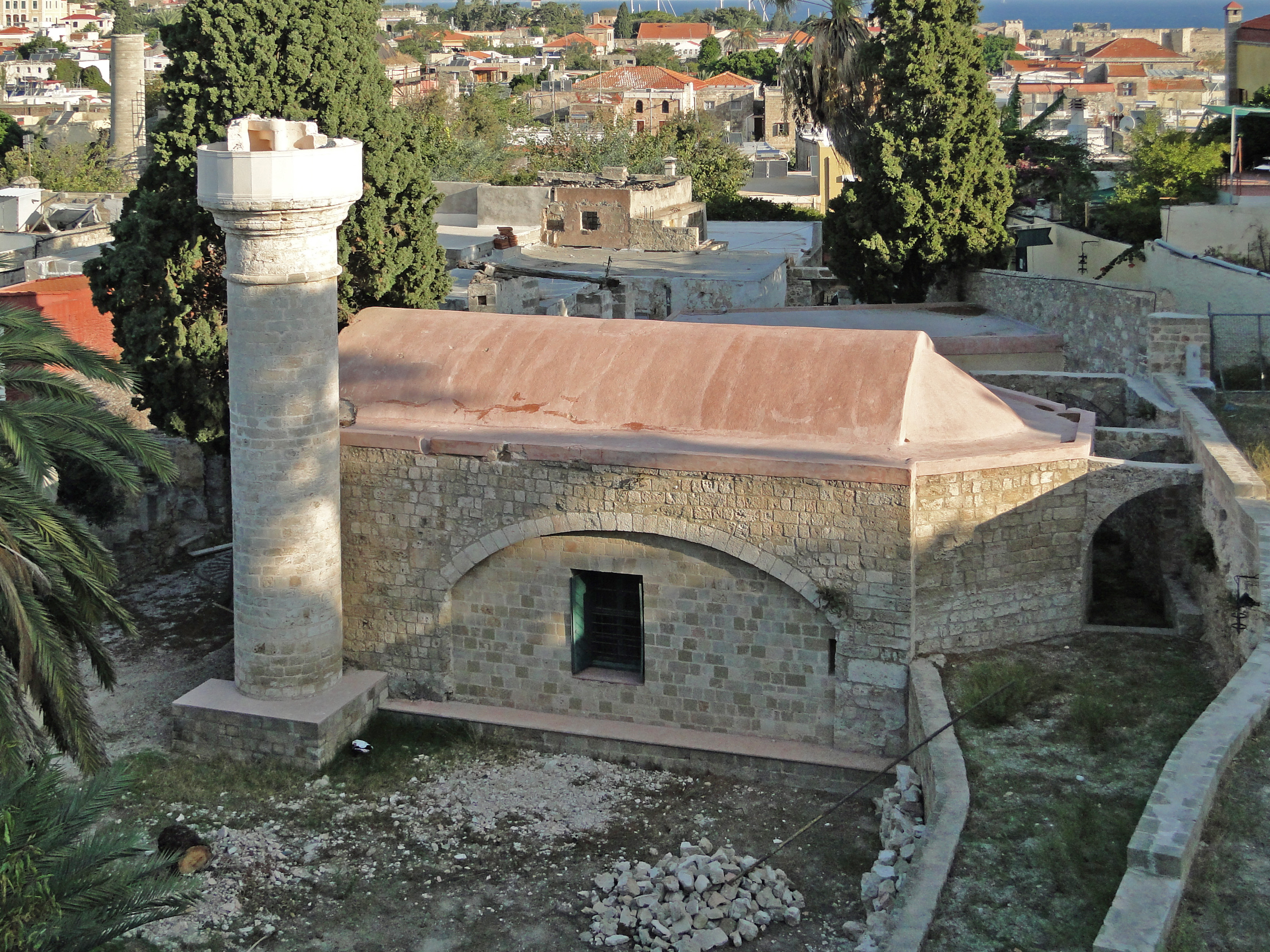
The Church of Agia Kyriaki in Rhodes, Greece

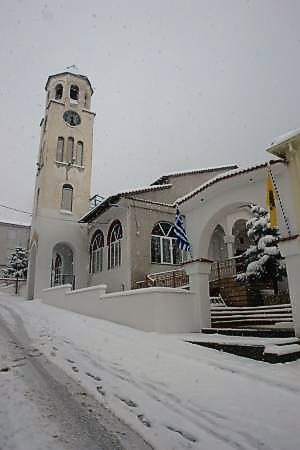
The Church of Agia Kyriaki in Servia, Kozani, Greece

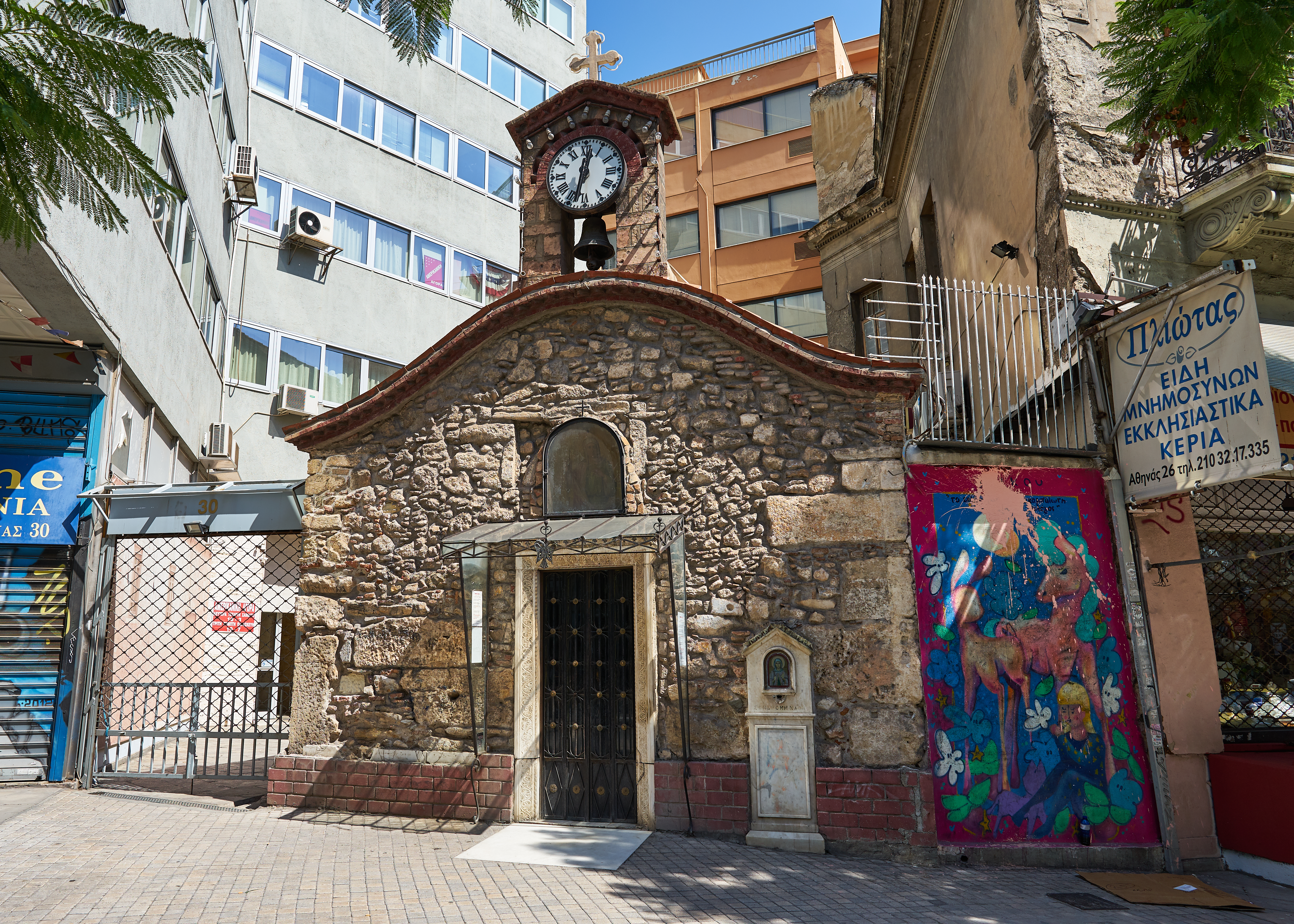
The Church of Agia Kyriaki in Athens, Greece

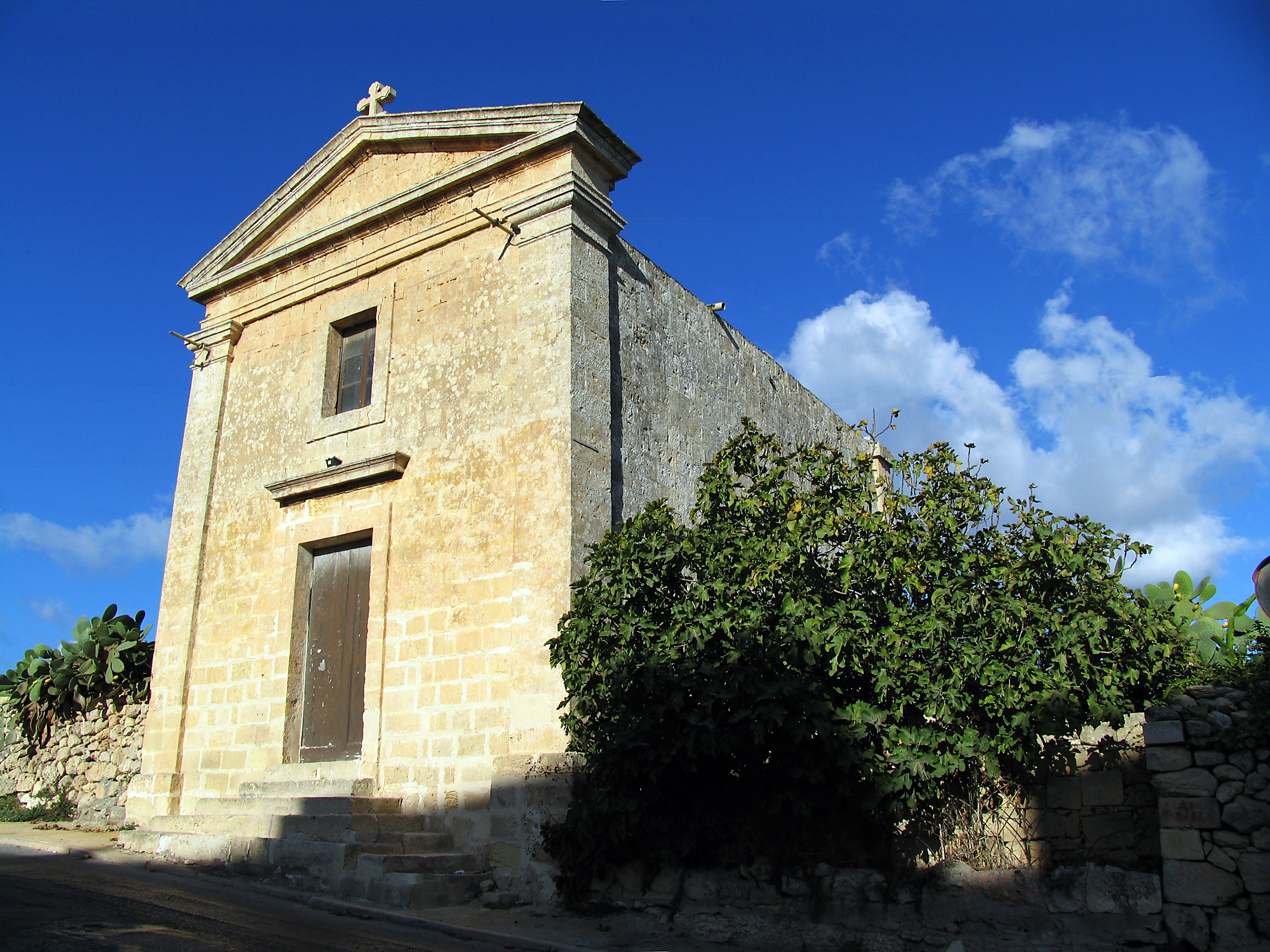
The Chapel of St Domenica in Dingli, Malta

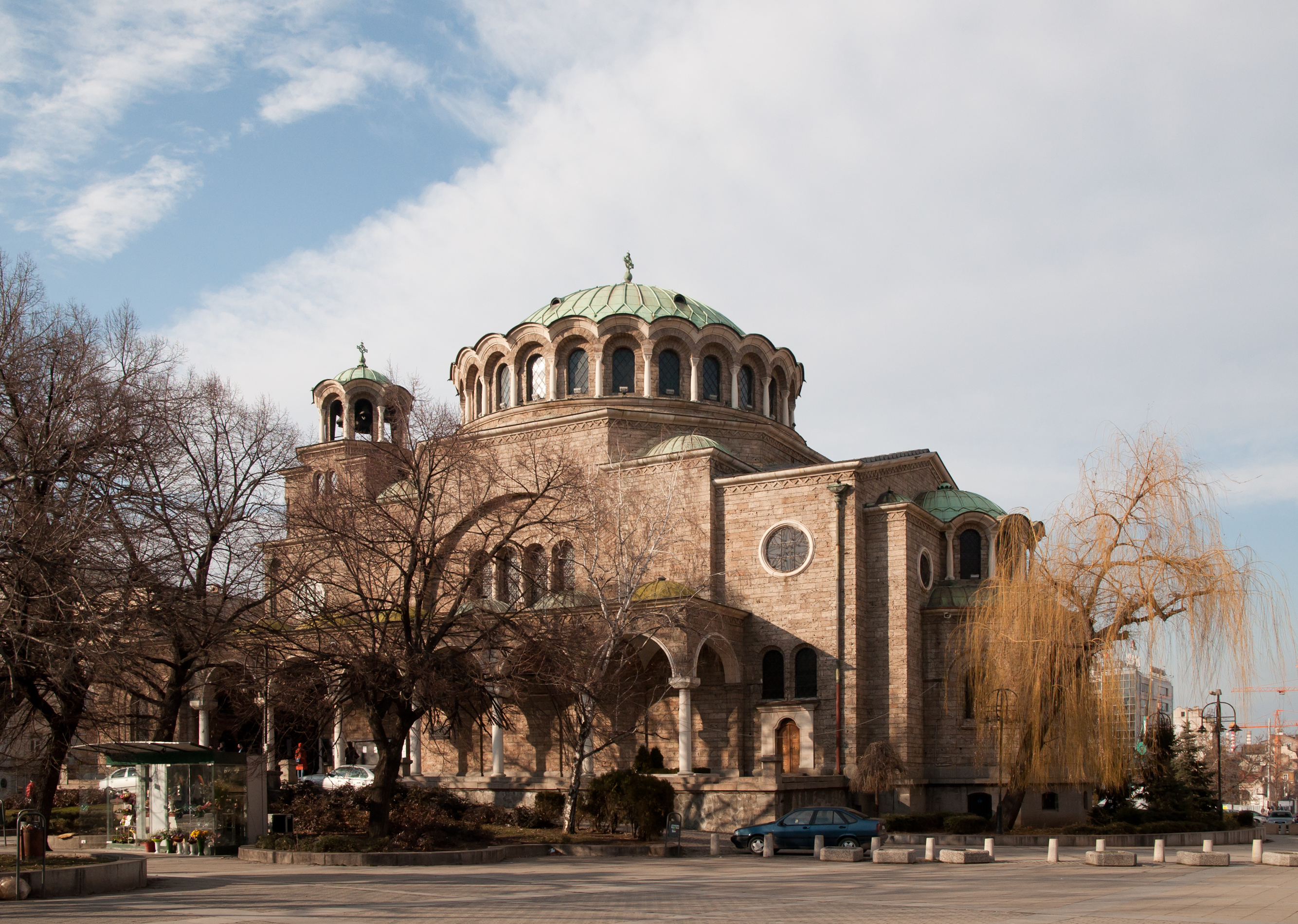
Saint Nedelya Cathedral in Sofia, Bulgaria
