= Agia Kyriaki =

Island in Greece

Coordinates: 36°32′55″N 26°24′15″E

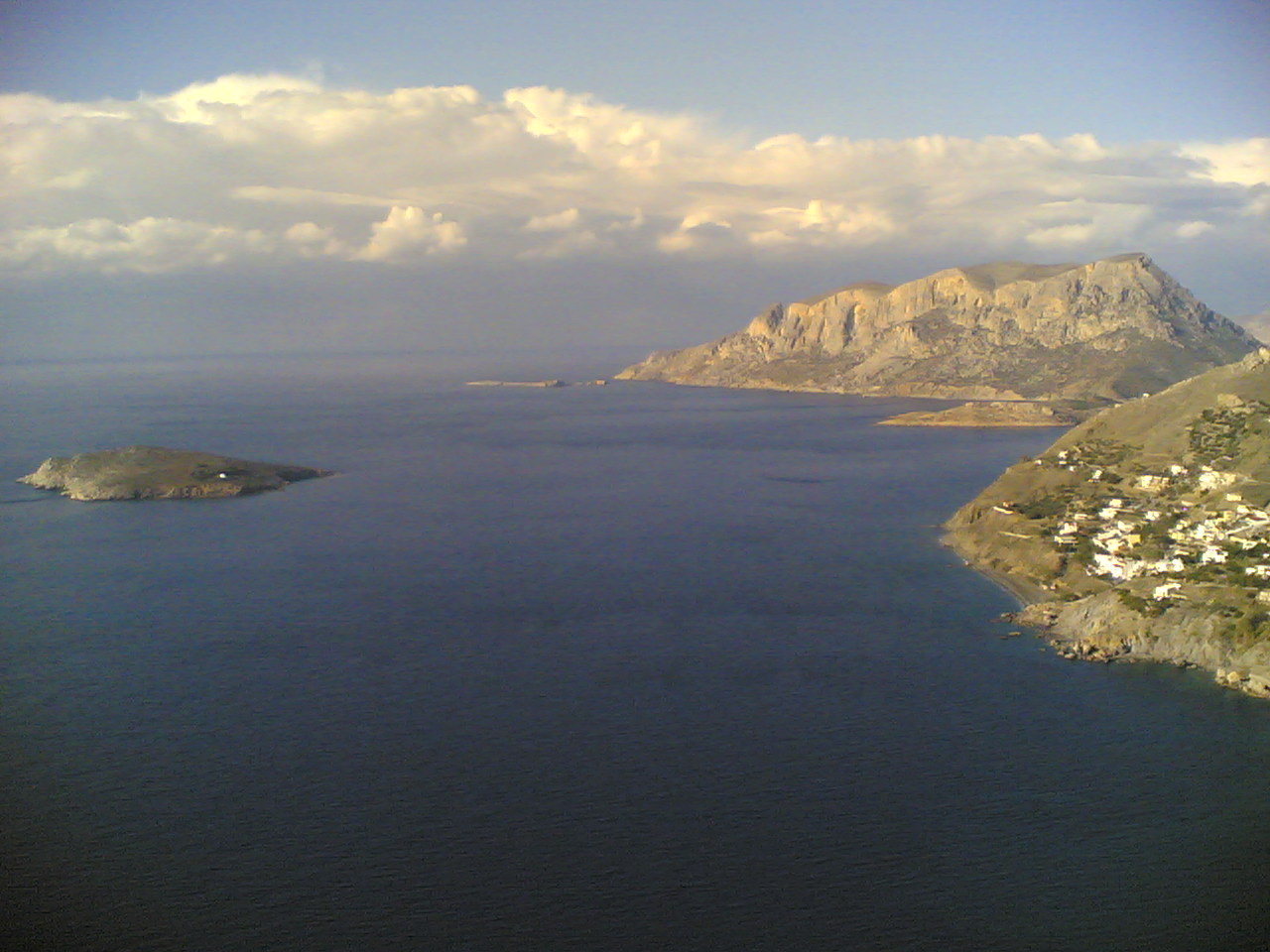
View from Southern Kalymnos looking northwest: island of Agia Kyriaki (left), Apano Nisia, and Telendos in the background

Agia Kyriaki (Greek: Αγία Κυριακή, Agía Kyriakí) is a small Greek island less than one mile from Astypalaia in the Dodecanese islands.

On the island is the small church of Agia (Saint) Kyriaki. Every July the people of Leros will go to the small island to celebrate the name day of the saint.
