= Buskett Gardens =

Park in Siġġiewi, Malta

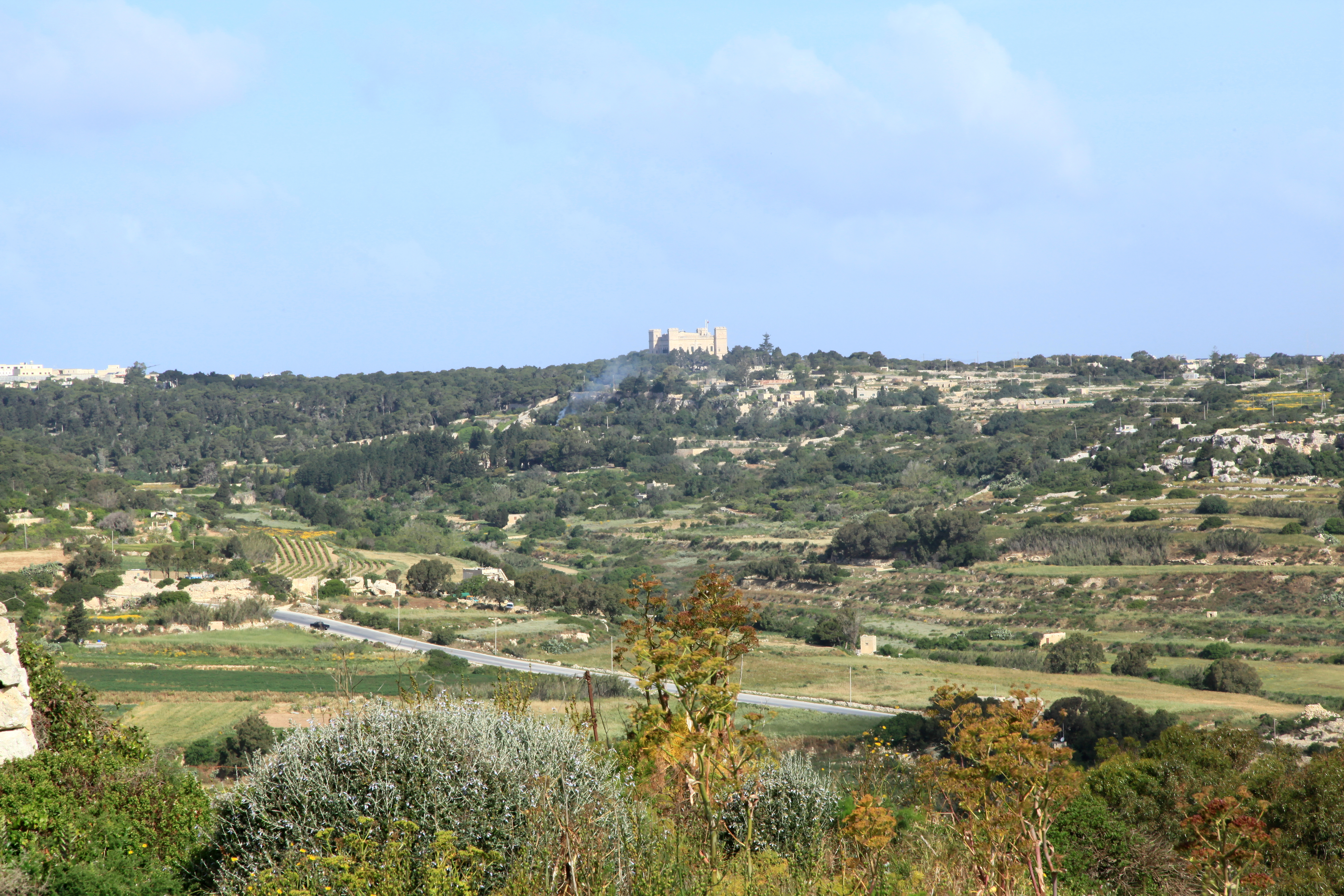
- View of Buskett from Siġġiewi
- Interactive map of Buskett Gardens

Geography
- Location: Siġġiewi, Malta
- Coordinates: 35°51′41″N 14°23′56″E
- Area: 473,694.5 m^{2} (5,098,805 sq ft)

Administration
- Established: 16th century
- Authority: Government of Malta

Ecology
- Dominant tree species: Oak, carob, olive, Aleppo pine, white poplar, ash, elm
- Fauna: Painted frog, many raptors and other birds

The Buskett Gardens (Maltese: Il-Buskett; Italian: Boschetto), forming one of the few woodland areas in Malta, are located in the fertile valley of Wied il-Luq in Rabat, Malta. The 30 ha site lies to the west of Siġġiewi (Città Ferdinand) and just east of Dingli. The Verdala Palace, an official residence of the President of Malta, stands on the edge of the Gardens.

== History ==
The presence of the gardens is known at least since the post-Roman Republic period and in which sexual celebrations in honor of their gods were traditional. When Eastern Christianity took root in Malta, this pagan feast was replaced by the Christian celebrations of St. Peter and St. Paul.

Indigenous forests once covered Malta, but trees were cut down for shipbuilding in the era when galleons plied the Mediterranean waters and for agricultural purposes. Buskett Gardens were planted by the Knights Hospitaller as a hunting reserve.

In June 1557, Grand Master Claude de la Sengle retreated to Buskett when his health began to deteriorate, and died at Mdina two months later.

== Description ==
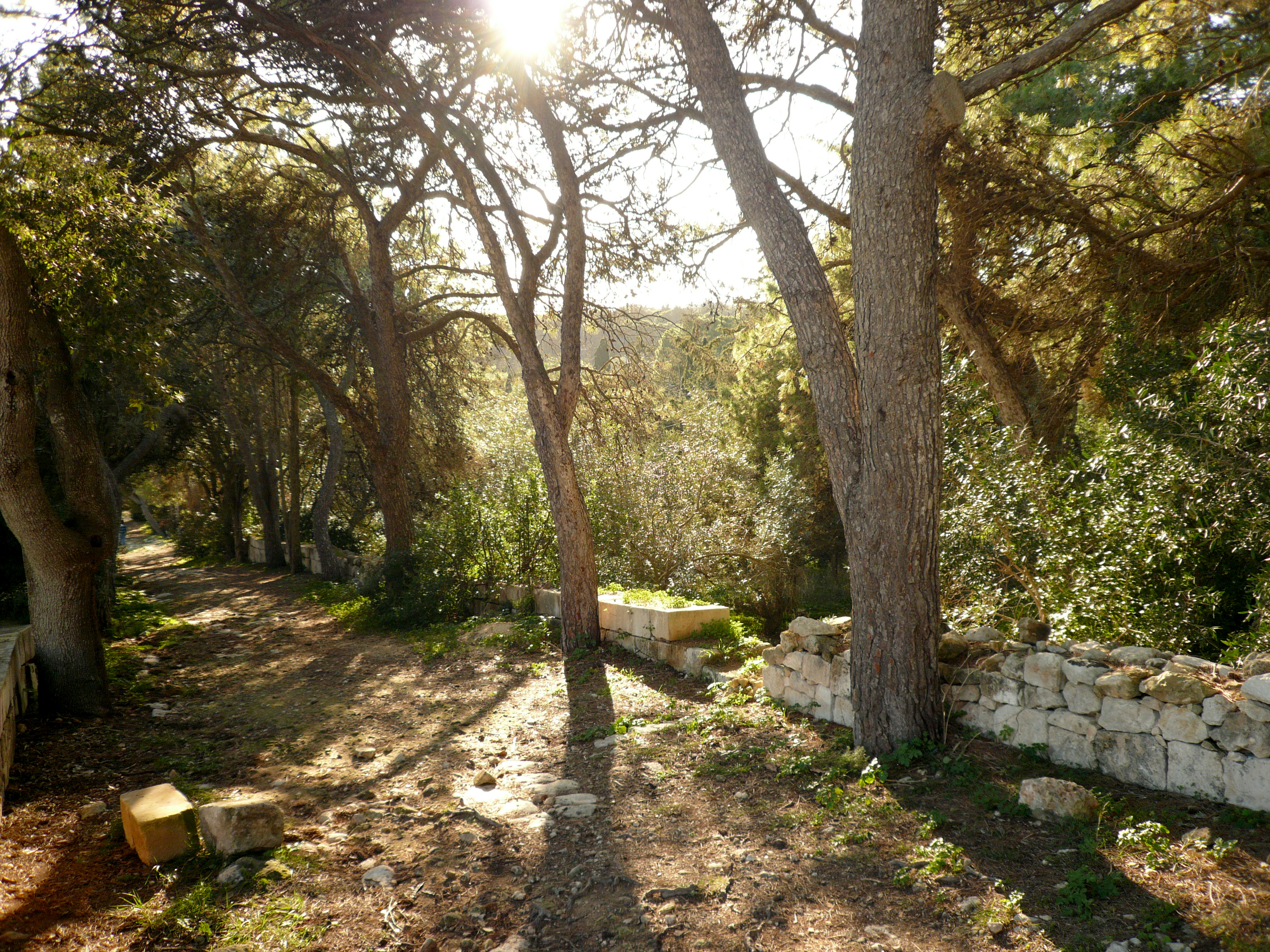
Buskett Gardens

The gardens contain broadleaved deciduous woodland, native coniferous woodland, with sclerophyllous garrigue and maquis shrubland, as well as groves of fruit trees. Many different trees and shrubs grow in the gardens, including numerous fruit-bearing trees. One of the greenest areas in Malta, the gardens are at their best in the spring but also provide shade from the harsh mid-summer sun and offer a quiet place for a walk in the winter months.

The gardens are very popular with the Maltese people, who often go for walks in the peaceful settings or enjoy a picnic in the shade of the trees. The gardens serve as a venue for the Feast of Imnarja which is celebrated on 29 June. Hundreds of people flock there the previous evening, to eat the traditional Maltese dish of rabbit stew cooked in wine, to listen to traditional folk music and singing, and to enjoy the annual agricultural show in the morning.

== Verdala Palace ==
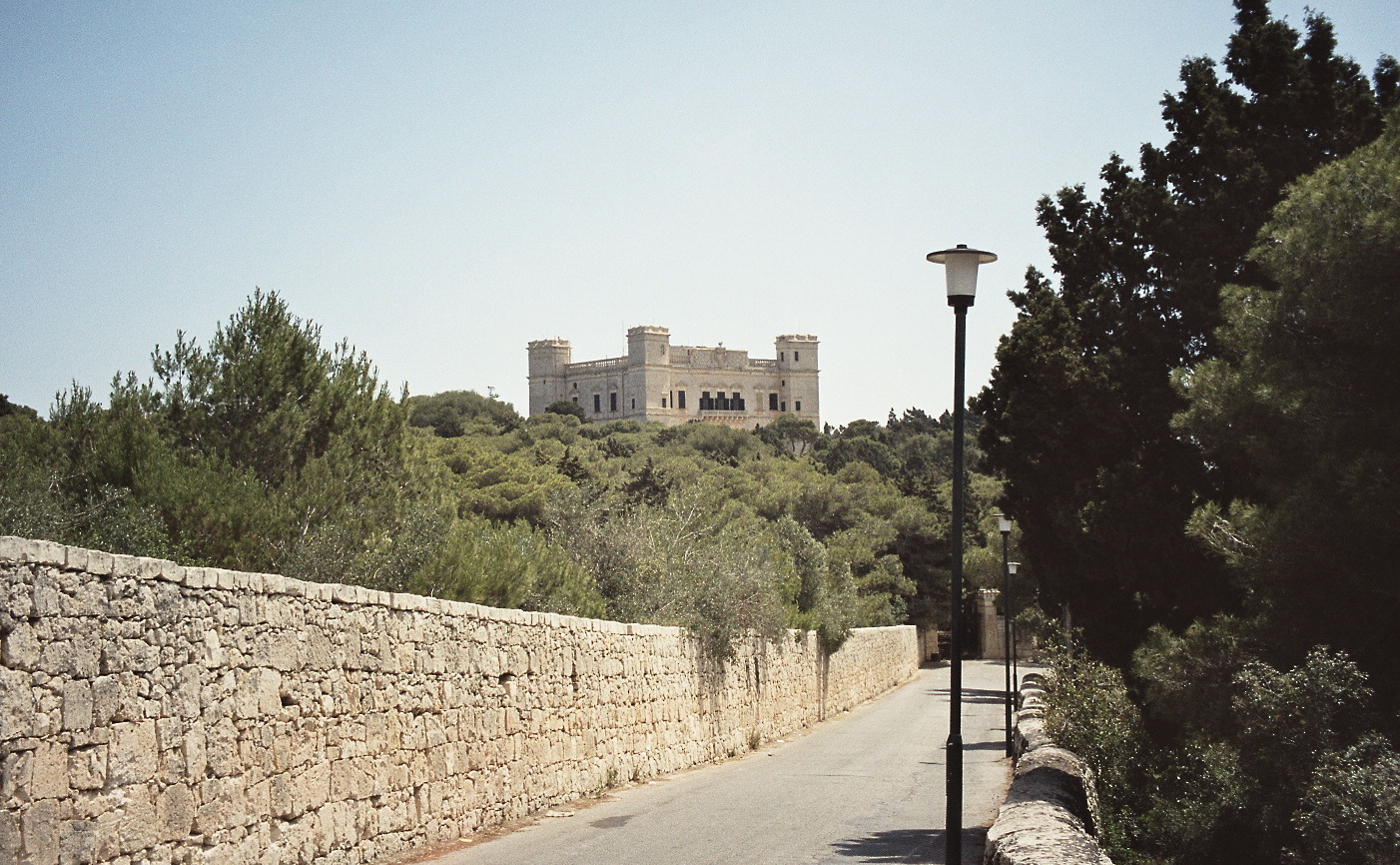
Verdala Palace and Buskett

The Verdala Palace is perched on a hilltop adjoining and overlooking Buskett Gardens. It was built by Grand Master Hughes de Verdalle in 1588 as a summer residence and hunting lodge. The building now serves as the President's summer residence. The palace is a landmark and not open to the public except for certain occasions.

== Important Bird Area ==
The gardens have been identified as an Important Bird Area (IBA) by BirdLife International because they support large numbers of bird species, especially as a sanctuary to those on seasonal migration through the Maltese Archipelago.

=== See also ===
- List of birds of Malta
