= Old Church of St Domenica, Dingli =

Old Church of Saint Domenica
- Knisja Medjevali ta' Santa Duminka
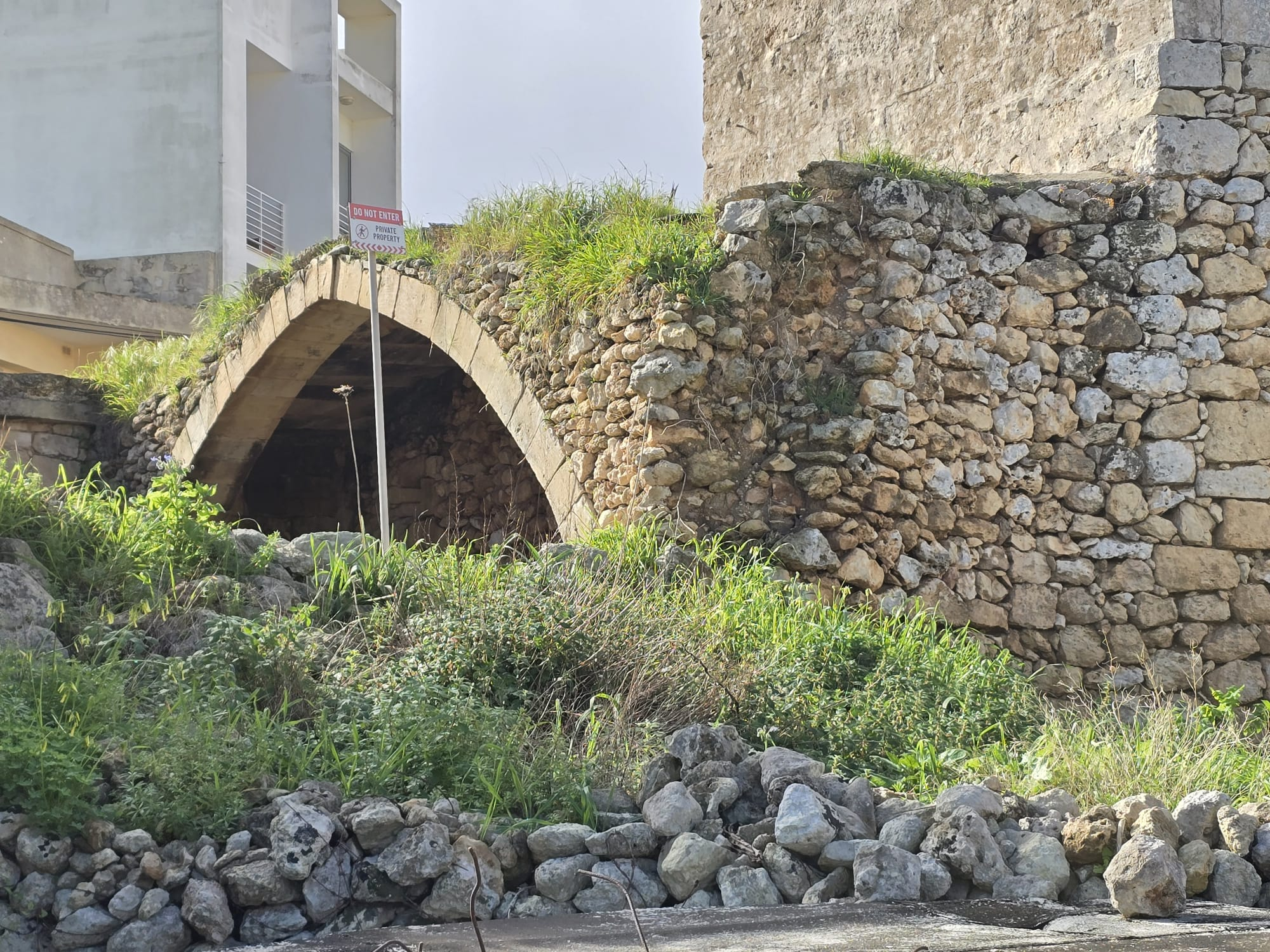
- Old Church of Saint Domenica
- 35°51′36.5″N 14°23′2.2″E
- Location: Dingli, Malta
- Denomination: Roman Catholic

History
- Status: Parish church
- Founded: c. 15th century
- Dedication: Saint Domenica

Architecture
- Functional status: Ruins

Specifications
- Materials: Limestone

Administration
- Diocese: Malta
- Parish: Ħal Tartarni

The Old Church of St Domenica (Maltese: Knisja Medjevali ta' Santa Duminka) is a ruined Roman Catholic parish church in Dingli, Malta, which was dedicated to Saint Domenica.

== History ==
The church is believed to date back to the 15th century. At the time it formed part of the village of Ħal Tartarni, which was also called Villaggio di S. Domenica after the church. The building became the village's parish church sometime before 1436.

Ħal Tartarni ceased to be a parish in 1539, when it was absorbed into the parish of St Paul of Rabat. The settlement later merged with the village of Dingli, which was established as an independent parish in the 17th century.

In November 2012 a proposal was made to schedule the remains of the church, but no action was taken until eight years later, after a new road was proposed to be constructed directly adjacent to the site in October 2020. This raised concerns among residents and NGOs that the church's fragile structure could collapse in the process and that its context would be lost. The church was finally scheduled as a Grade 1 monument by the Planning Authority on 14 October.
