= Chapel of St Domenica, Dingli =

Chapel of Saint Domenica
- Kappella ta' Santa Domenika
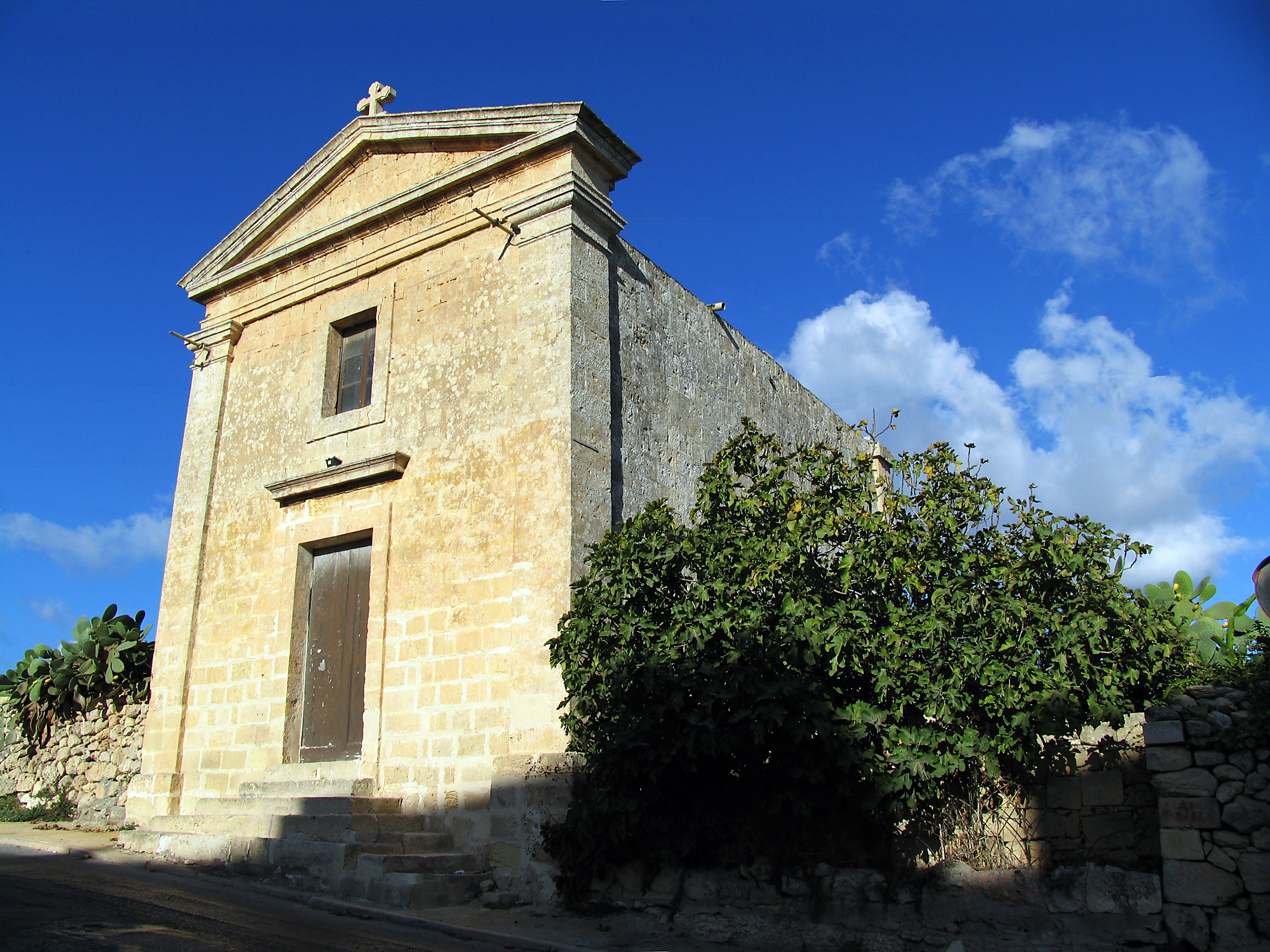
- The chapel in 2005
- Chapel of Saint Domenica
- 35°51′48.2″N 14°23′4.4″E
- Location: Dingli, Malta
- Denomination: Roman Catholic

History
- Status: Chapel
- Founded: 1669
- Founder: Marc'Antonio Inguanez
- Dedication: Saint Domenica

Architecture
- Functional status: Active

Specifications
- Materials: Limestone

Administration
- Archdiocese: Malta
- Parish: Dingli

The Chapel of St Domenica (Maltese: Kappella ta' Santa Domenika) is a Roman Catholic chapel in Dingli, Malta, which is dedicated to Saint Domenica. It was built in the 17th century.

== History ==
The chapel of St Domenica was established in 1669 by the nobleman Marc'Antonio Inguanez, and it was constructed on his lands as jus patronatus. It is annexed to the garden of Diar il-Bniet.

Today, Mass is celebrated within the chapel once a year. The building is listed on the National Inventory of the Cultural Property of the Maltese Islands.

== Architecture ==
The chapel is small and it has a simple façade which includes a rectangular door and window, flanked by flat pilasters with Doric capitals on either side. Above the pilasters there is an entablature and a triangular pediment which is topped by a small stone cross. The chapel has a single altar.
