= St Mary Magdalene Chapel, Dingli =

Saint Mary Magdalene Chapel
- Kappella ta' Santa Marija Maddalena
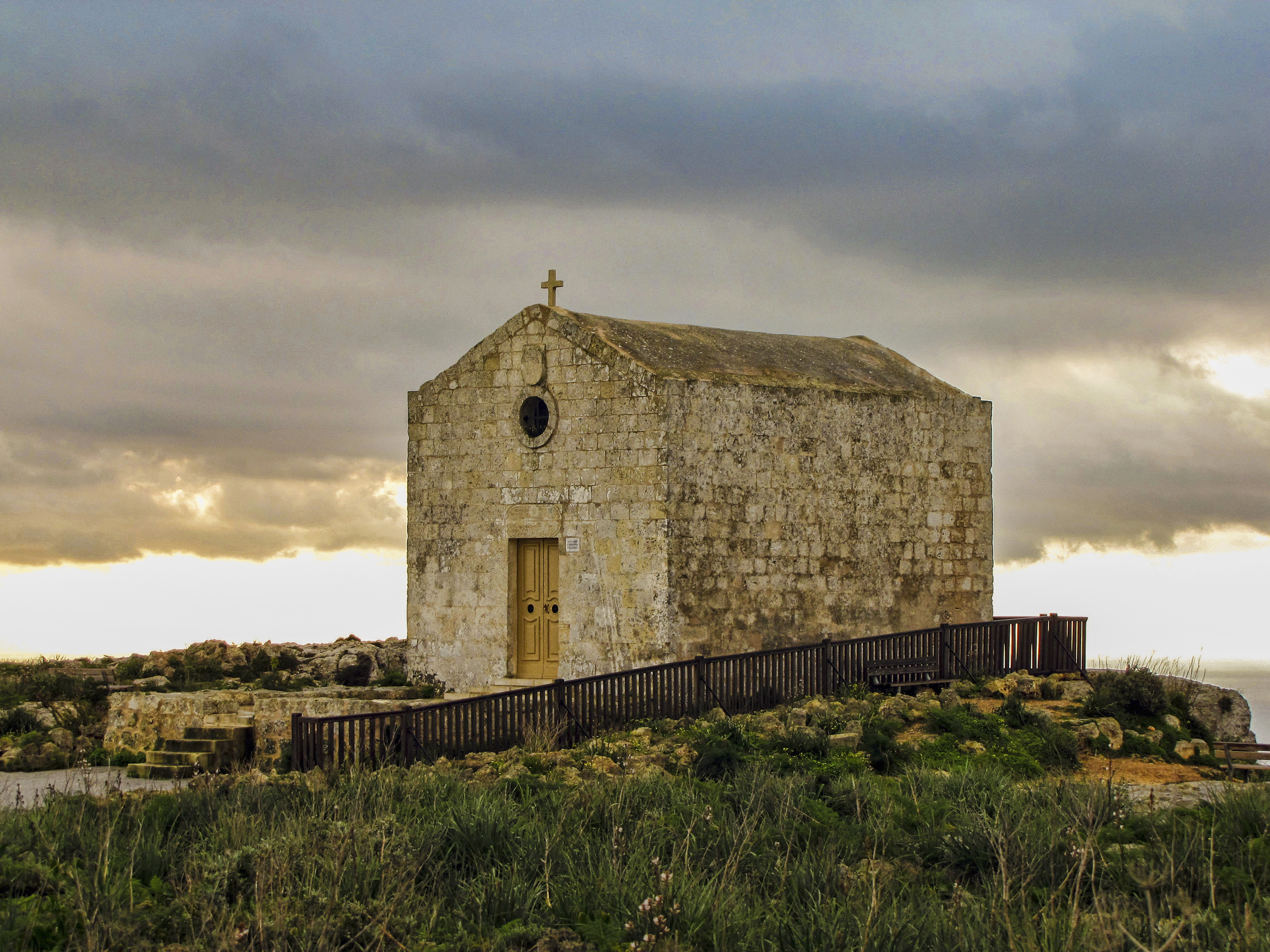
- View of St. Mary Magdalene Chapel
- Saint Mary Magdalene Chapel
- 35°51′6.1″N 14°23′8.2″E
- Location: Dingli
- Country: Malta
- Denomination: Roman Catholic

History
- Status: Chapel
- Founded: before 1446
- Dedication: Mary Magdalene

Architecture
- Functional status: Active
- Style: Vernacular
- Completed: 15 April 1646

Specifications
- Materials: Limestone

Administration
- Archdiocese: Malta
- Parish: Dingli

Saint Mary Magdalene Chapel (Maltese: Kappella ta' Santa Marija Maddalena) is a Roman Catholic chapel in the limits of Dingli, Malta, dedicated to Mary Magdalene. It overlooks the Dingli Cliffs, and is therefore commonly known as il-kappella tal-irdum (chapel of the cliffs). The chapel was built in 1646 on the site of an earlier one which had existed since at least the 15th century. Its simple architecture is typical of Maltese wayside chapels.

== History ==
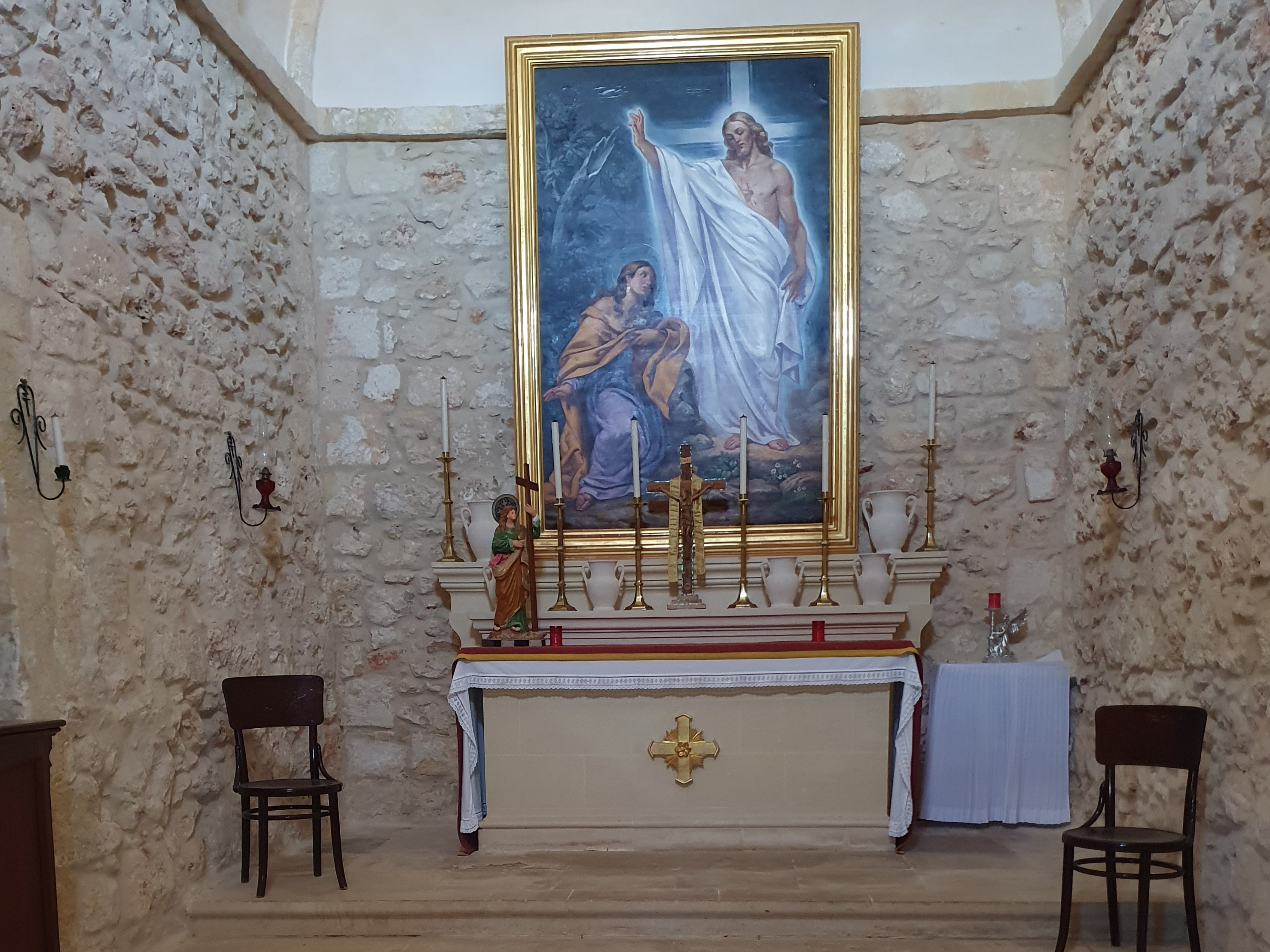
Interior of chapel, featuring the main altar

The date of construction of the chapel is not known, but the oldest reference to the building was made in 1446. It is located on the Dingli Cliffs, far from the town itself, and it was used by farmers who lived in nearby farms. The chapel was in a state of disrepair by 1575, and it later collapsed. It was rebuilt in the 17th century, being reopened by Bishop Miguel Juan Balaguer Camarasa on 15 April 1646. The reconstruction is commemorated by a Latin inscription above its doorway.

In 1777, a plaque stating non gode l'immunita ecclesias was installed near the doorway to indicate that the chapel did not enjoy ecclesiastical immunity.

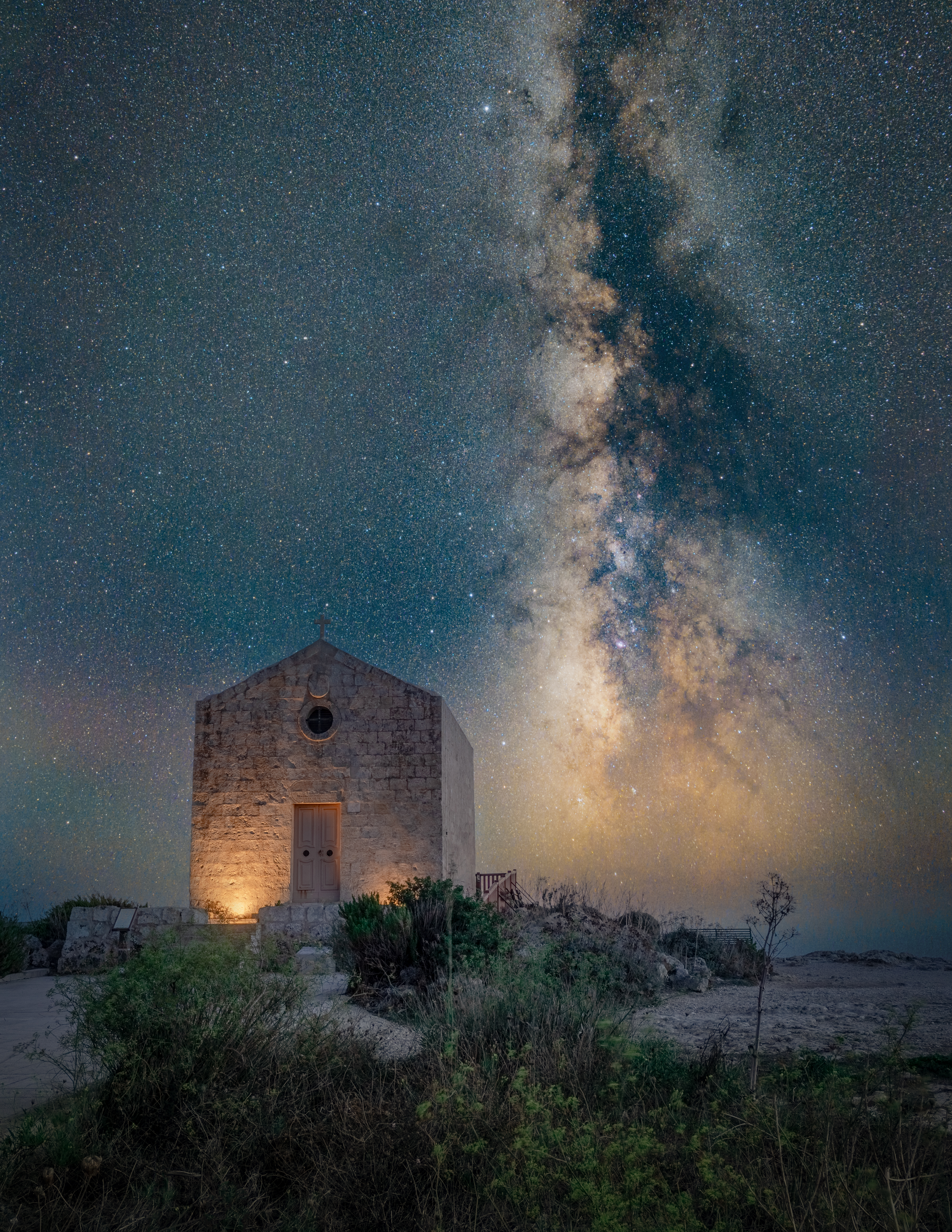
Located in one of the few areas of the Maltese islands that are not heavily impacted by nocturnal light pollution, the Milky Way can be viewed behind it on a clear night

The chapel was deconsecrated by Bishop Gaetano Pace Forno in the 19th century, but it was later reconsecrated. It was hit by lightning on 4 February 1936, damaging the circular window on the façade, but it was later repaired.

In May 2005, the chapel began to be restored by the Restoration Unit of the Ministry of Resources and Infrastructure, under the supervision of architect David Vassallo. Restoration works included the strengthening of the roof, the replacement of old cement with hydraulic lime, and installing new paving for the chapel and its parvis. A replica non gode l'immunita ecclesias plaque was also installed, after the original had been stolen. The Dingli parish also commissioned a new altar, while Dun Ġwann Abela and his family donated an altarpiece. The restored chapel was inaugurated on 20 May 2007.

The chapel was hit again by lightning during a thunderstorm on 10 December 2014, damaging the window and the top part of the façade. Some debris hit the altar, damaging the altarpiece. The damage was subsequently repaired by the Restoration Directorate, and the chapel reopened in April 2015.

The chapel is listed on the National Inventory of the Cultural Property of the Maltese Islands.

== Architecture ==
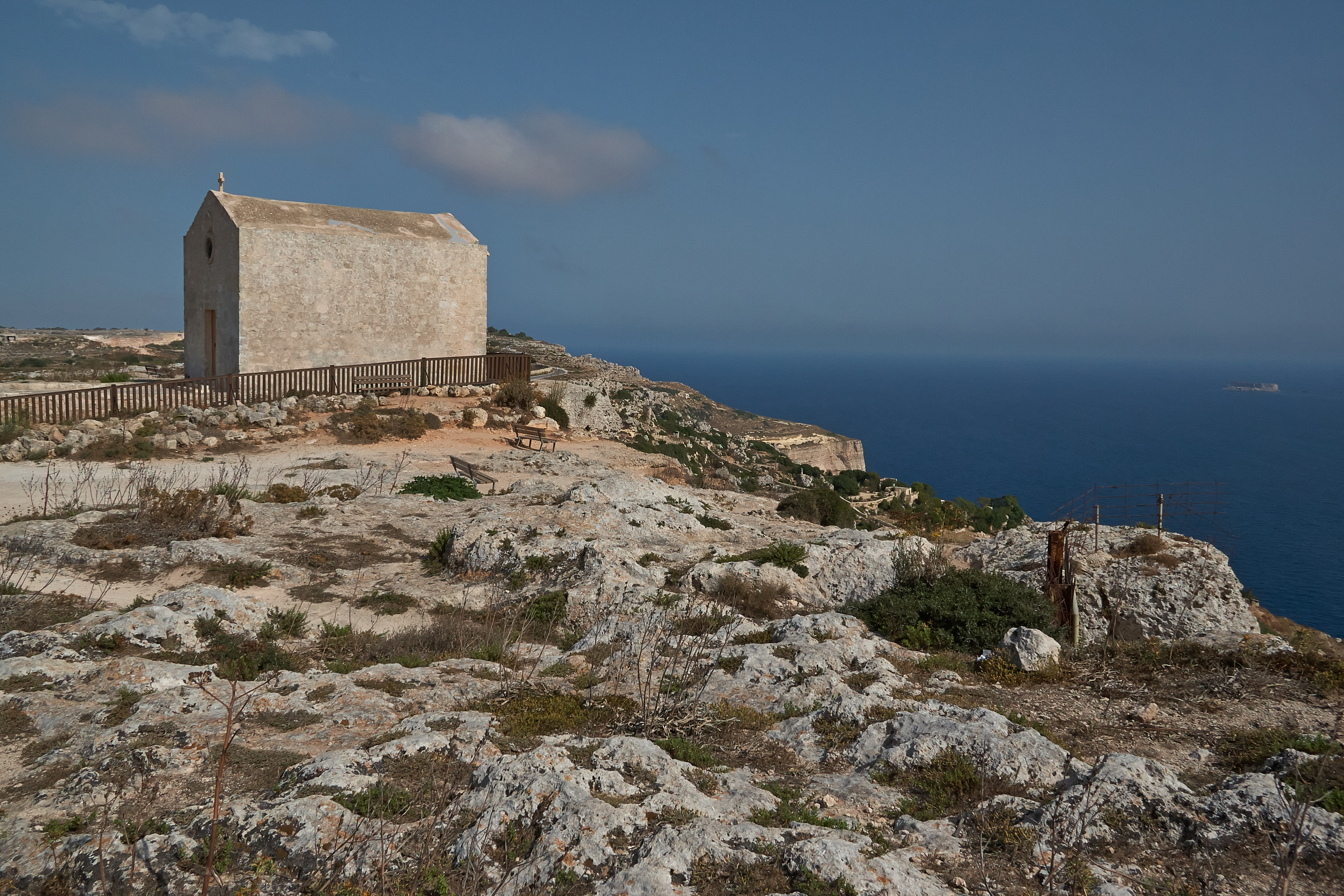
The chapel overlooking the Dingli Cliffs

St. Mary Magdalene Chapel has a simple design, typical of Maltese wayside chapels. It has a rectangular structure, with its façade containing a single doorway and a circular window. A Latin inscription is located just above the door, while a slab originally containing a coat of arms is located above the window. A small parvis (Maltese: zuntier) is located outside the church, and a railing is located nearby to protect visitors to the chapel from falling down the cliffs.

The church has an altar built of Maltese limestone. The altarpiece is The Risen Christ by Paul Camilleri Cauchi, depicting Jesus forgiving a penitent Mary Magdalene after his resurrection.
