= Hugues Loubenx de Verdalle =

Grand Master of the Knights Hospitaller (1531–1595)

His Eminence Hugues Loubenx de Verdalle
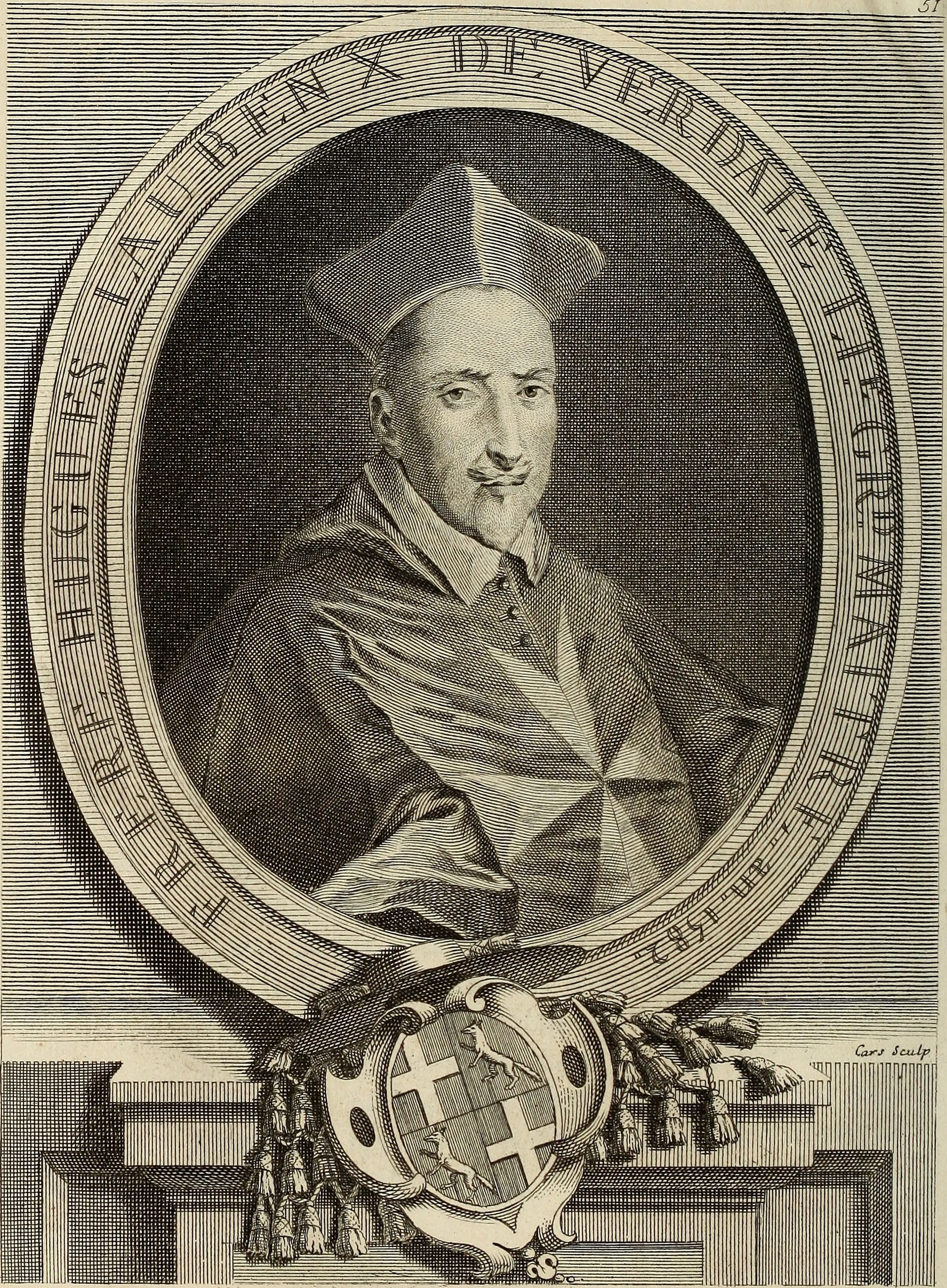
- FRERE HUGHES LAUBENX DE VERDALE LI.^{E} GR.^{D} MAITRE an. 1582. (1726 portrait)

Grand Master of the Order of Saint John
- In office 12 January 1582 – 4 May 1595
- Monarch: King Philip I
- Preceded by: Jean de la Cassière
- Succeeded by: Martin Garzez

Personal details
- Born: 1531 Provence, France
- Died: 4 May 1595 (aged 63–64) Malta
- Resting place: St. John's Co-Cathedral

Military service
- Allegiance: (Sovereign Military Order of Malta) Order of Saint John

Fra' Hugues Loubenx de Verdalle (13 April 1531 – 4 May 1595) was the 52nd Grand Master of the Order of Malta, between 1582 and 1595.

== History ==
He is mainly remembered for the reconstruction of the hunting lodge at Boschetto which was renamed Verdala Palace in his honour. The palace is located in the Buskett Gardens, within the limits of Siġġiewi. He is buried in a sarcophagus in the Crypt of the Co-Cathedral of St. John in Valletta. He was made Cardinal-Deacon of S. Maria in Portico Octaviae by Pope Sixtus V in the consistory of December 18, 1587.

Verdalle owned 230 slaves at the time of his death, and some of them were bequeathed to his relatives and friends.

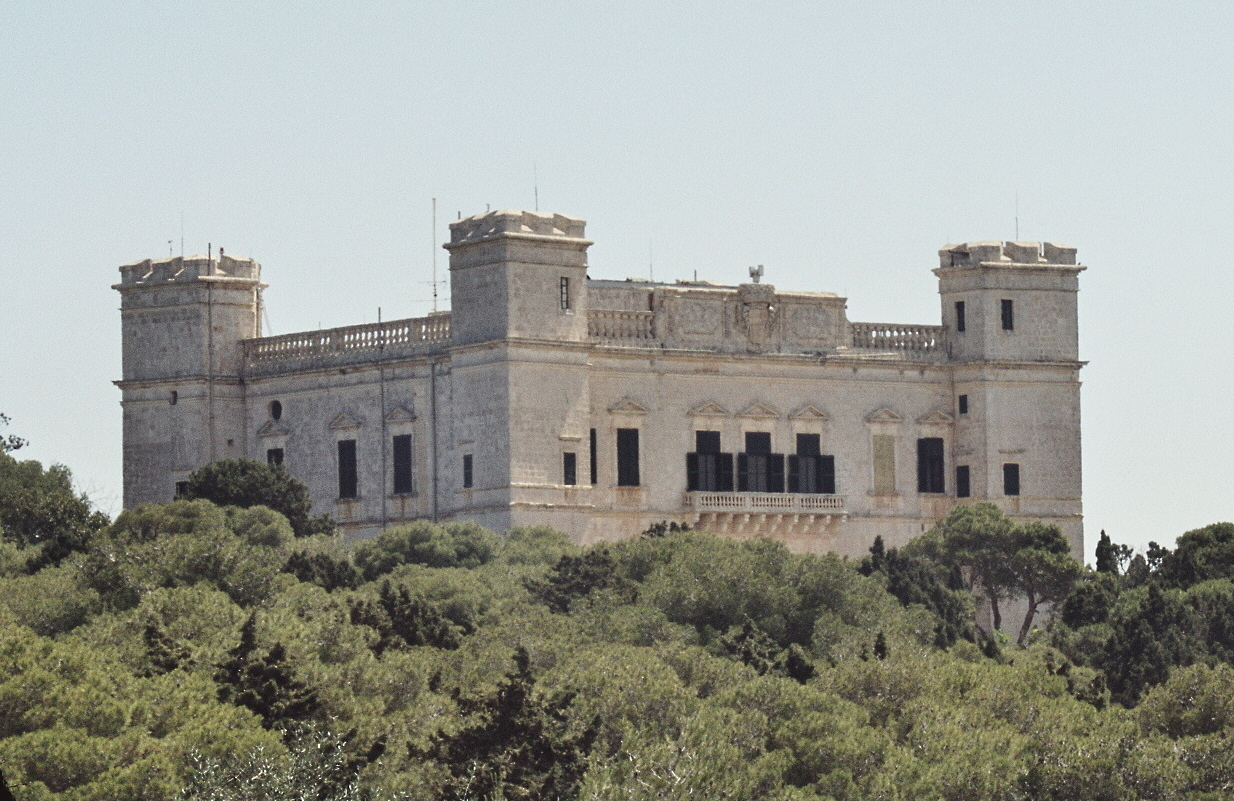
Verdala Palace

Preceded by Jean de la Cassière	Grand Master of the Knights Hospitaller; 1582–1595	Succeeded by Martin Garzez
