= Verdala Palace =

- Il-Palazz Verdala
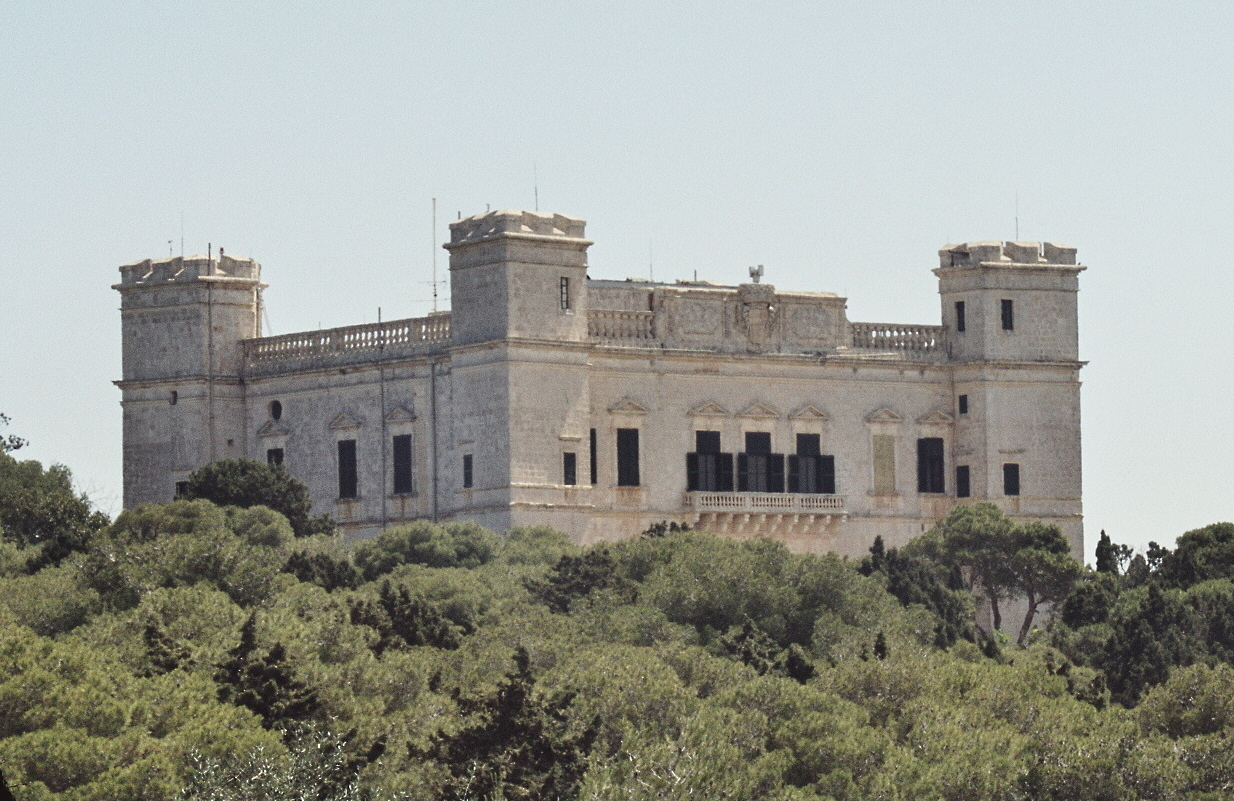
- View of Verdala Palace

- Location within Malta
- Alternative names: Verdala Castle

General information
- Status: Intact
- Type: Palace
- Architectural style: Renaissance
- Location: Buskett Gardens, Siġġiewi, Malta
- Coordinates: 35°51′41.4″N 14°24′2.3″E
- Current tenants: President of Malta
- Named for: Hugues Loubenx de Verdalle
- Construction started: after 1581
- Completed: 1586
- Renovated: 17th century and 1720s
- Owner: Government of Malta

Technical details
- Material: Limestone

Design and construction
- Architect: Girolamo Cassar

Website
- Official website

Verdala Palace is a palace in the Buskett Gardens, limits of Siġġiewi, Malta. It was built in 1586 during the reign of Hugues Loubenx de Verdalle, and now serves as the official summer residence of the President of Malta. The palace was previously a residence of the British governor of Malta, together with the San Anton Palace, and was often used by British sovereigns and other royalty during their stay in Malta.

== History ==
The site of Verdala Palace was originally occupied by a hunting lodge, which was built in the 1550s or 1560s during the magistracy of Grand Master Jean Parisot de la Valette. The lodge was built in the Boschetto, a large semi-landscaped area that was used by knights of the Order of Saint John for game hunting. The hunting lodge was expanded into a palace in 1586, during the magistracy of Hugues Loubenx de Verdalle, after whom the palace was named. It was further embellished in the 17th and 18th centuries, during the magistracy of Giovanni Paolo Lascaris and António Manoel de Vilhena.

During Lascaris' magistracy, Zafire Hatun, a concubine of the Ottoman sultan, spent her final days at Verdala Palace. She had been moved there when her health deteriorated shortly after her capture by the Hospitallers in 1644.

During the French blockade of 1798–1800, the palace served as a military prison for French soldiers captured by the Maltese or British. During British rule, it became a silk factory, but it was eventually abandoned and fell into a state of disrepair. Some repairs were undertaken during the governorship of Frederick Ponsonby, and it was fully restored by Governor Sir William Reid in the 1850s. Prior to its restoration it was a temporal minor hospital between 1915 and 1916. It subsequently became the official summer residency of the Governors of Malta. It was included on the Antiquities List of 1925. On the outbreak of World War II in 1939, works of art from the National Museum were stored at the palace for safekeeping. The palace was restored in 1982 and began to be used to host visiting heads of state.

Over the years, the palace welcomed several distinguished guests, including:

- Edward VII and Alexandra of Denmark, King and Queen of the United Kingdom
- Maria Feodorovna, Empress of Russia (1909)
- George V and Mary of Teck, King and Queen of the United Kingdom (1912)
- George VI, King of the United Kingdom (1913 and 1943)
- Wilhelm II, Emperor of Germany (1909)
- Muammar Gaddafi, Libyan dictator
- Josip Broz Tito, President of Yugoslavia
- Nicolae Ceaușescu, President of Romania
- Giovanni Leone, President of Italy

Since 1987, the Verdala Palace has been in use as the summer residence of the President of Malta, and it is generally closed to the public except for the August Moon Ball held annually in aid of the Malta Community Chest Fund.

== Architecture ==
Verdala Palace was designed by Girolamo Cassar, a Maltese architect mostly known for the design of many buildings in the capital Valletta. The palace is an example of Renaissance architecture, and its design is possibly influenced by Villa Farnese in Caprarola.

The building has a rectangular plan, with pentagonal bastion-like turrets on each corner. The building itself has two floors, while the corner turrets are about five storeys high. The entire structure is surrounded by a stone quarried ditch. Although the turrets and ditch gave the palace the outward appearance of a fort, they were mainly symbolic, and the palace was never really intended to withstand any attack. Nonetheless, the palace was still armed with four pieces of artillery on the roof. The interior is very ornate, with frescoes on some of the ceilings.

A chapel, stables and servant quarters are located a short distance away from the palace.

== Ghost story ==
Verdala Palace is supposedly haunted by the "blue Lady", a niece of Grand Master de Rohan. She was due to marry a suitor who she did not like, so she committed suicide by jumping off the balcony in her bedroom. Her ghost is reportedly seen roaming the palace, wearing the same blue dress she wore when she died; her wedding dress.

== Gallery ==
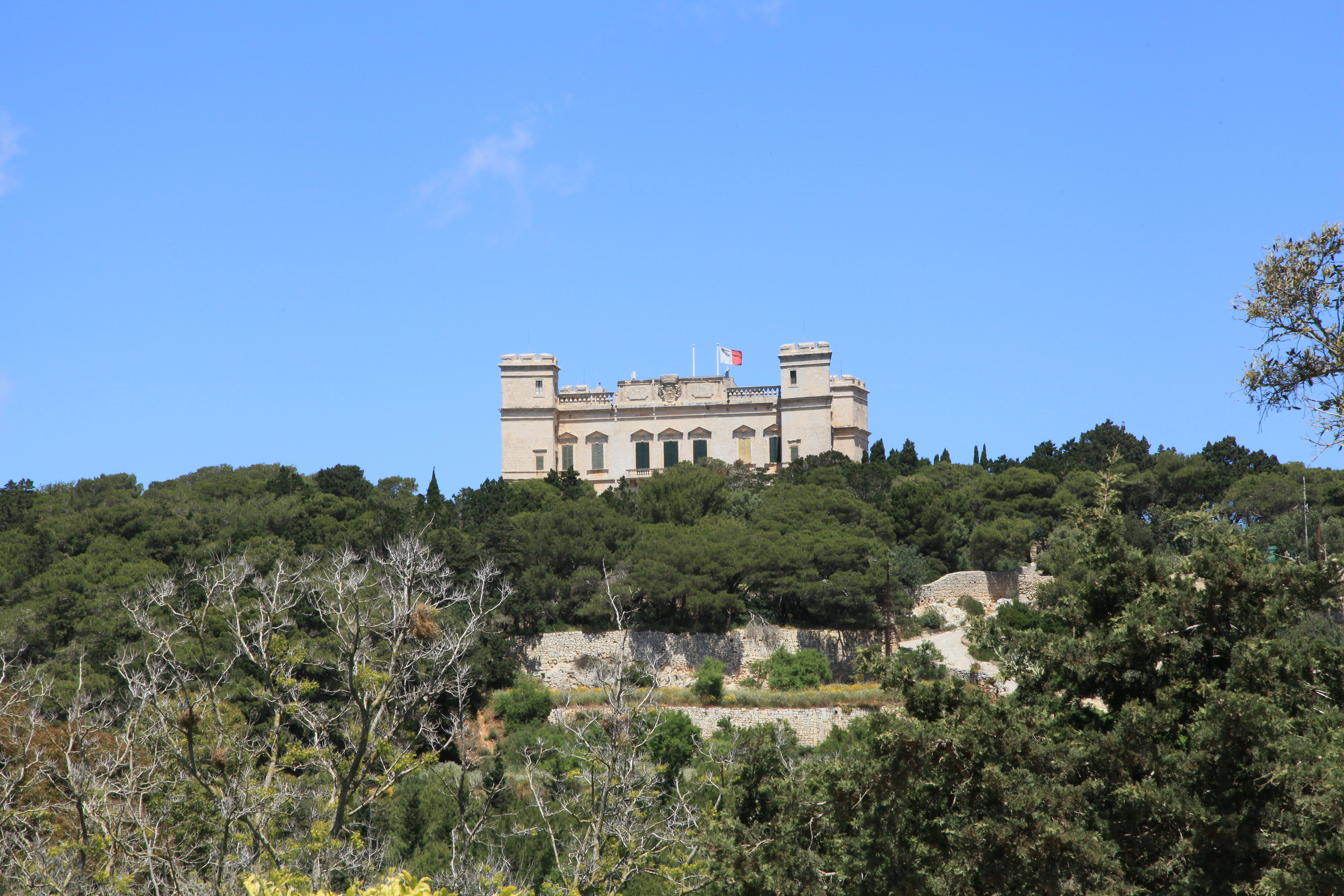
View of Verdala Palace overlooking Buskett Gardens

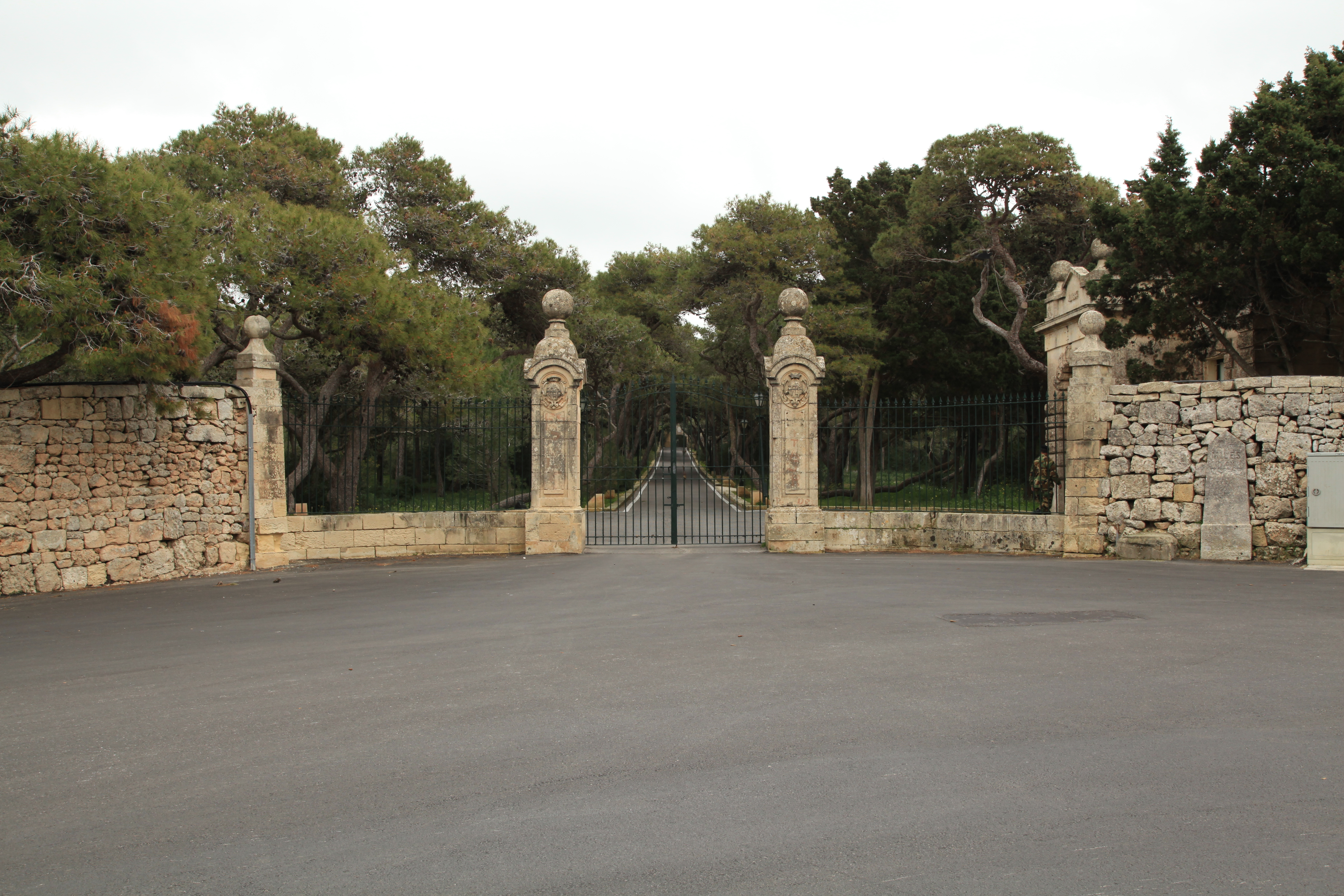
Verdala Palace Gate

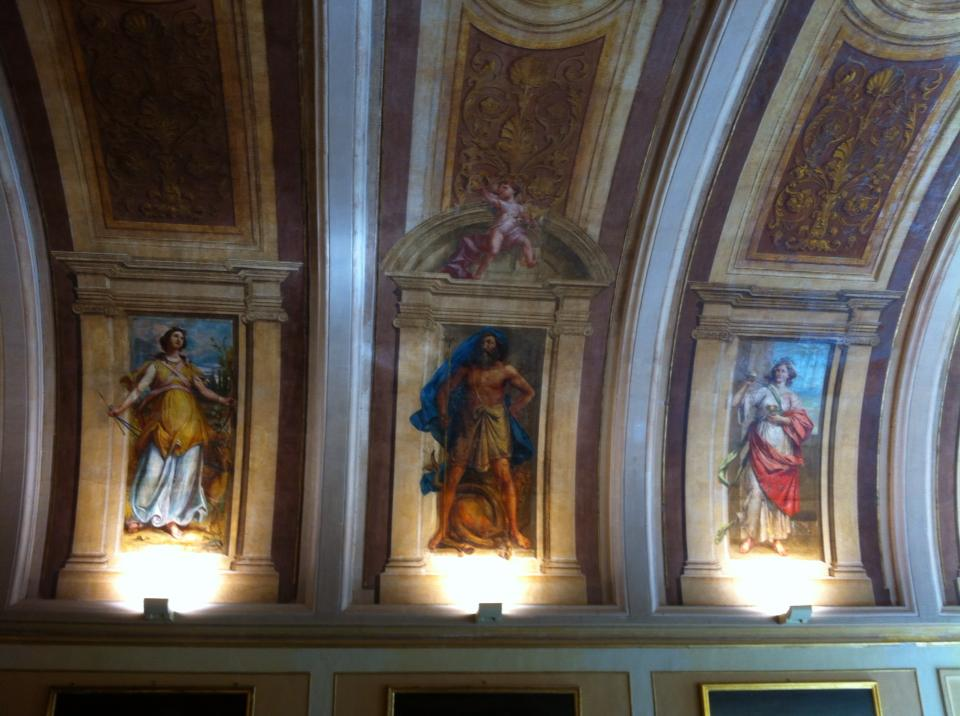
Ceiling of the dining room

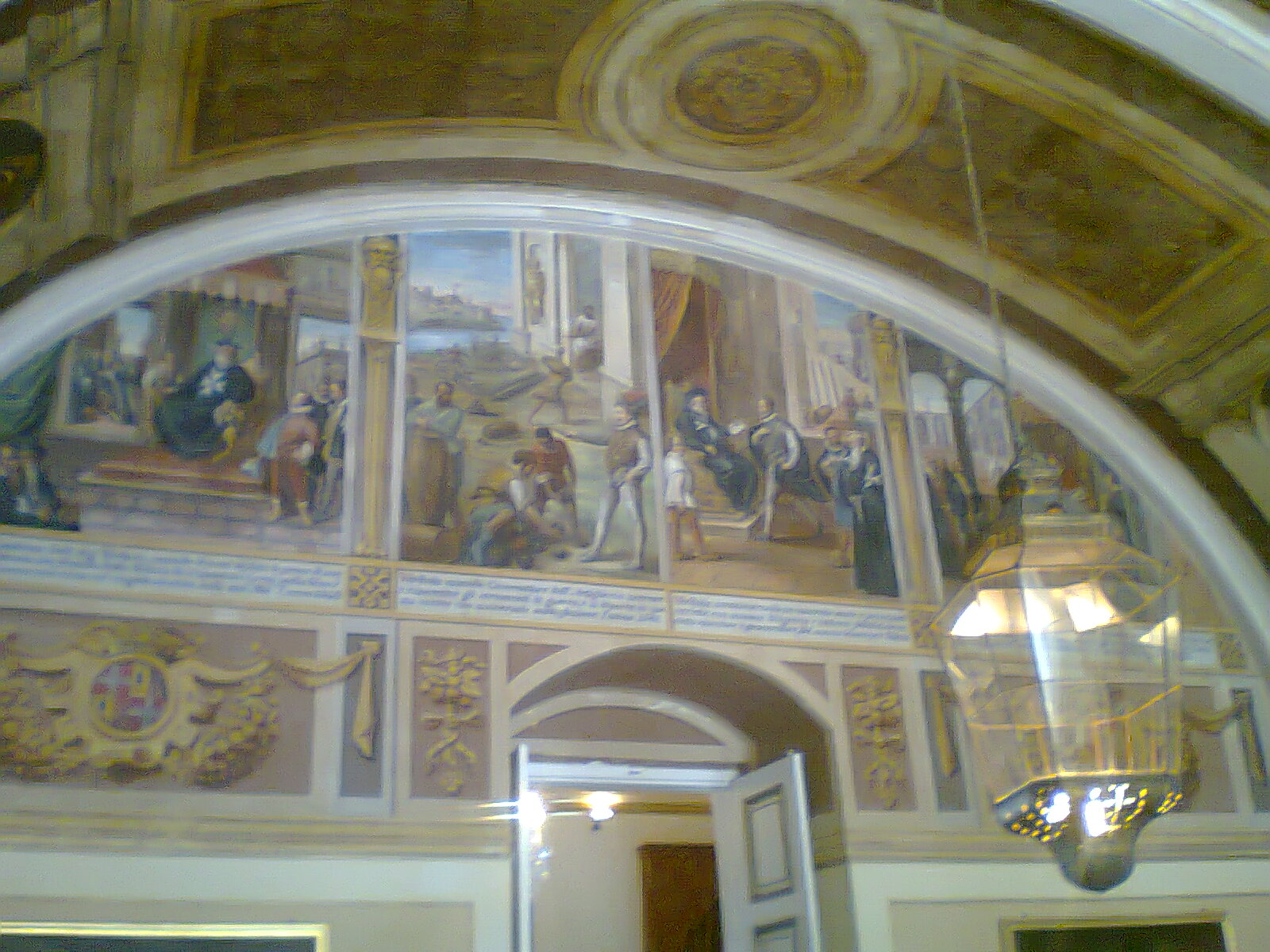
Frescoes in the palace

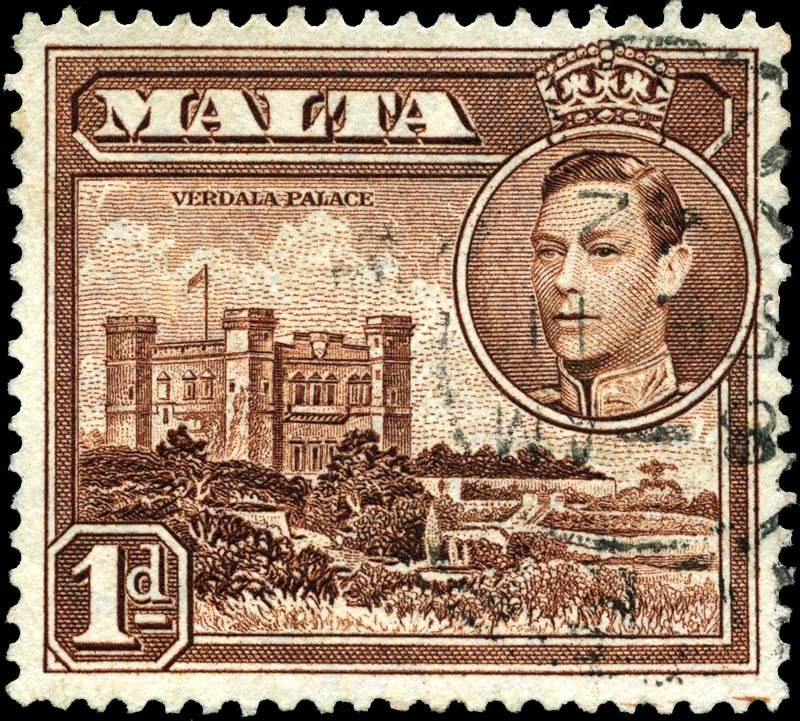
Verdala Palace on a 1938 postage stamp
