= Dingli =

Dingli Ħad-Dingli Casal Dingli, (Note: At the time of the Order of Saint John) Ħal Tartarni (Note: The name of a nearby abandoned village)
- Local council
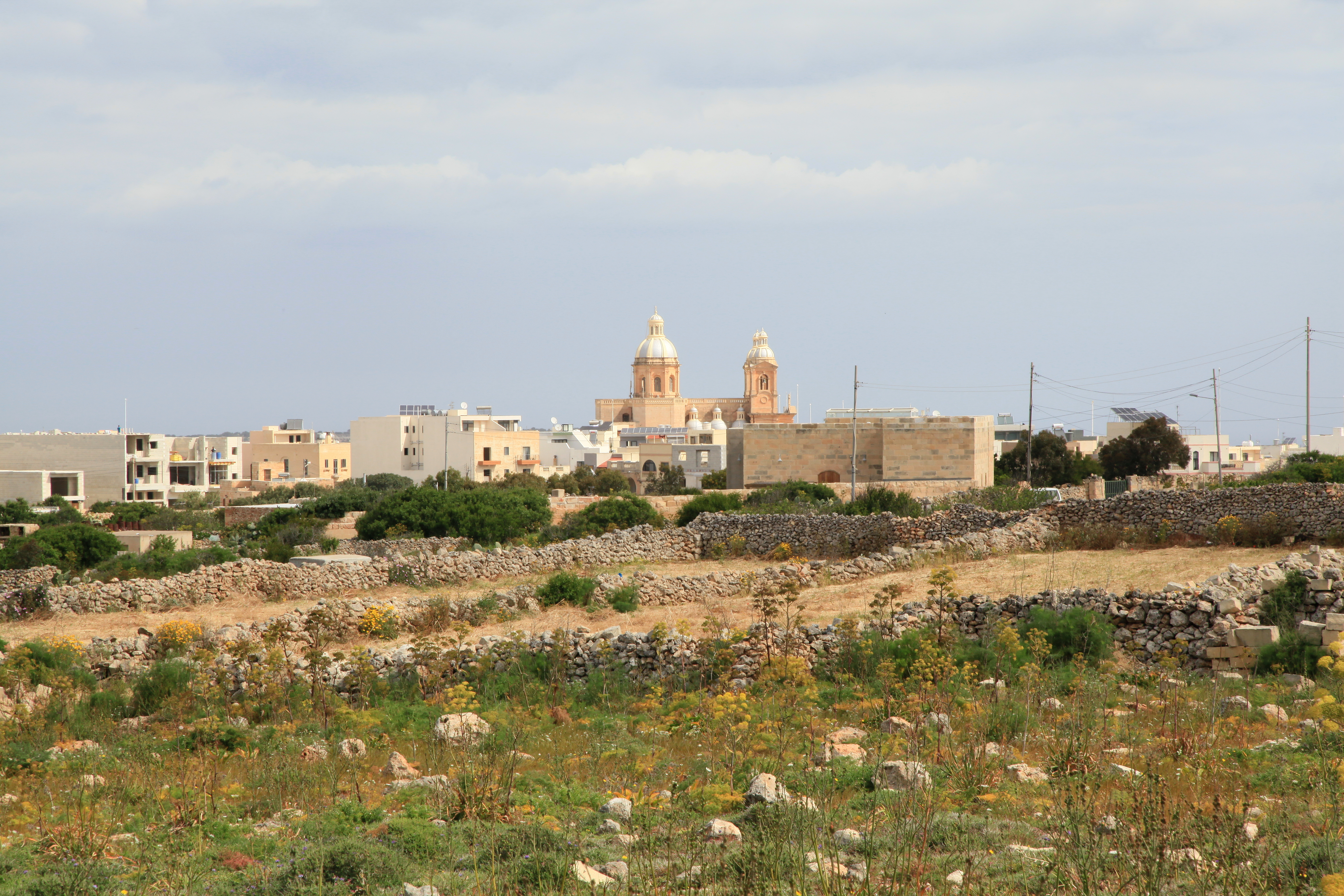
- Dingli skyline

- Flag Coat of arms
- Motto: Non Segnis Quies Ruris (Rural quiet is not indolence)
- Coordinates: 35°51′37″N 14°22′53″E
- Country: Malta
- Region: Western Region
- District: Western District
- Borders: Rabat, Siġġiewi

Government
  - Mayor: Raymond Schembri (PL)

Area
  - Total: 5.7 km^{2} (2.2 sq mi)
- Elevation: 230 m (750 ft)

Population (Jul. 2024)
  - Total: 3,950
  - Density: 690/km^{2} (1,800/sq mi)
- Demonym(s): Dingli (m), Dinglija (f), Dinglin (pl)
- Time zone: UTC+1 (CET)
  - Summer (DST): UTC+2 (CEST)
- Postal code: DGL
- Dialing code: 356
- ISO 3166 code: MT-07
- Patron saint: Assumption of Our Lady
- Day of festa: First Sunday after 15 August
- Website: Official website
- Buses 52 and 56 from Valletta terminus

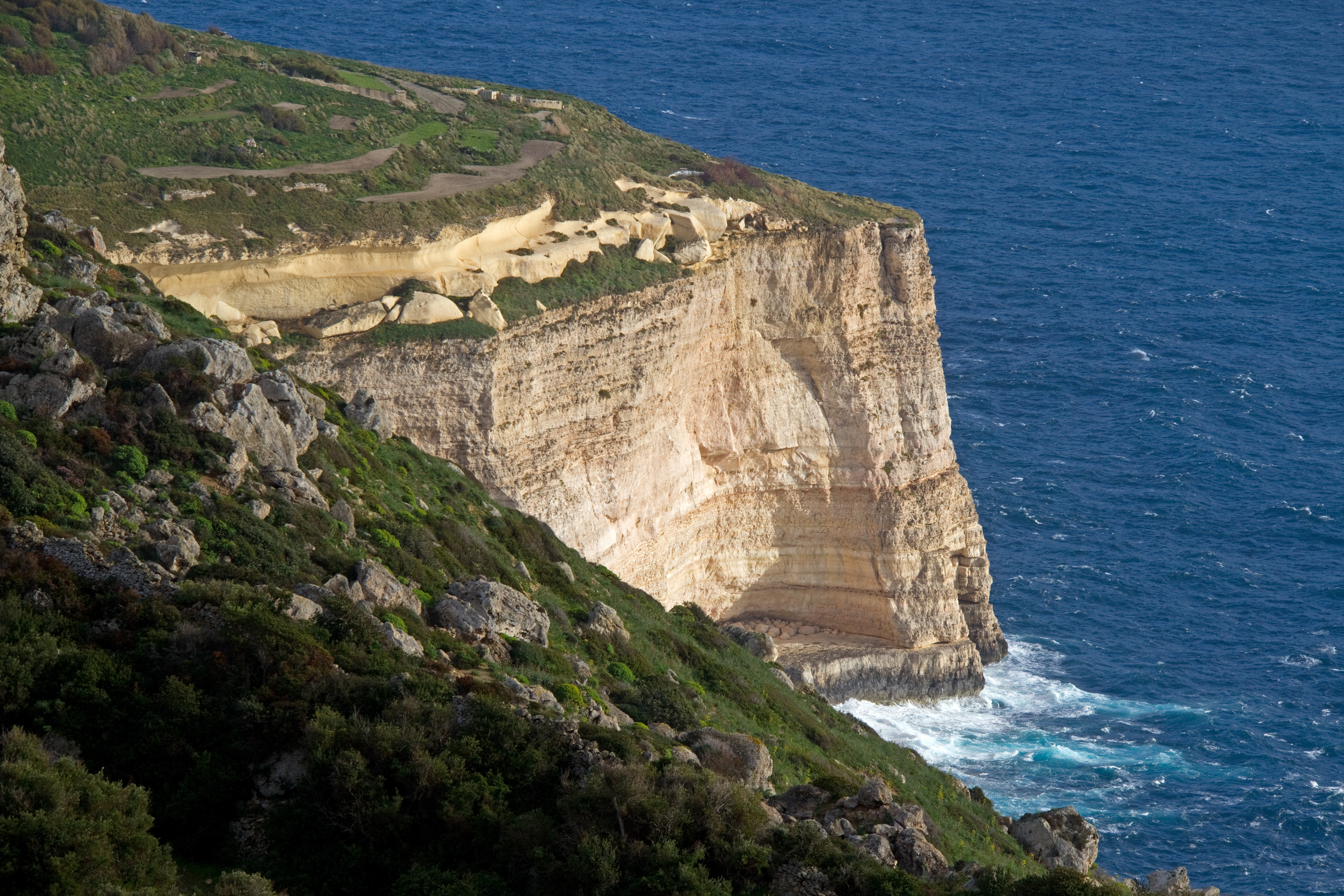
The Dingli Cliffs

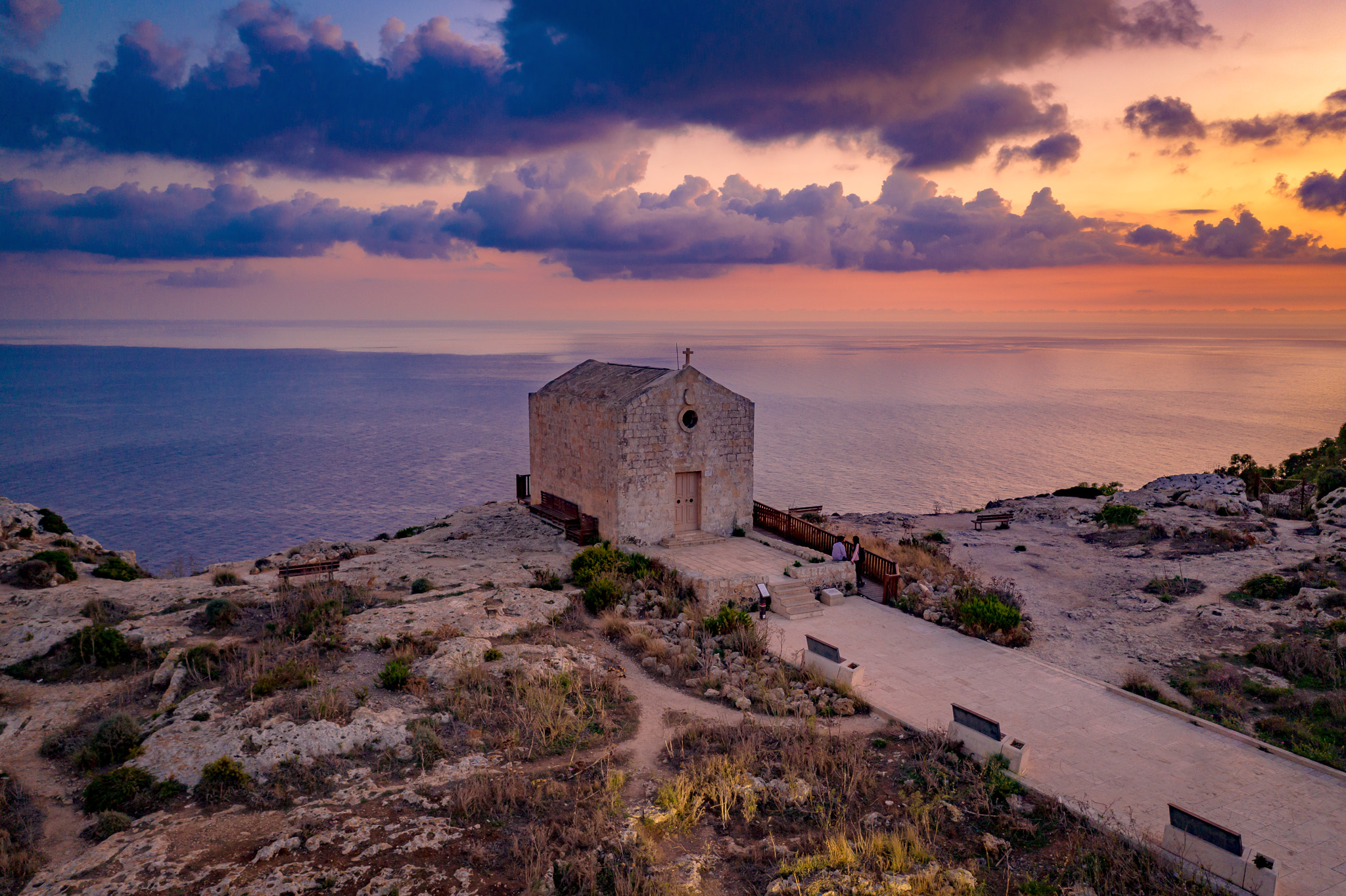
Chapel of St. Mary Magdalene

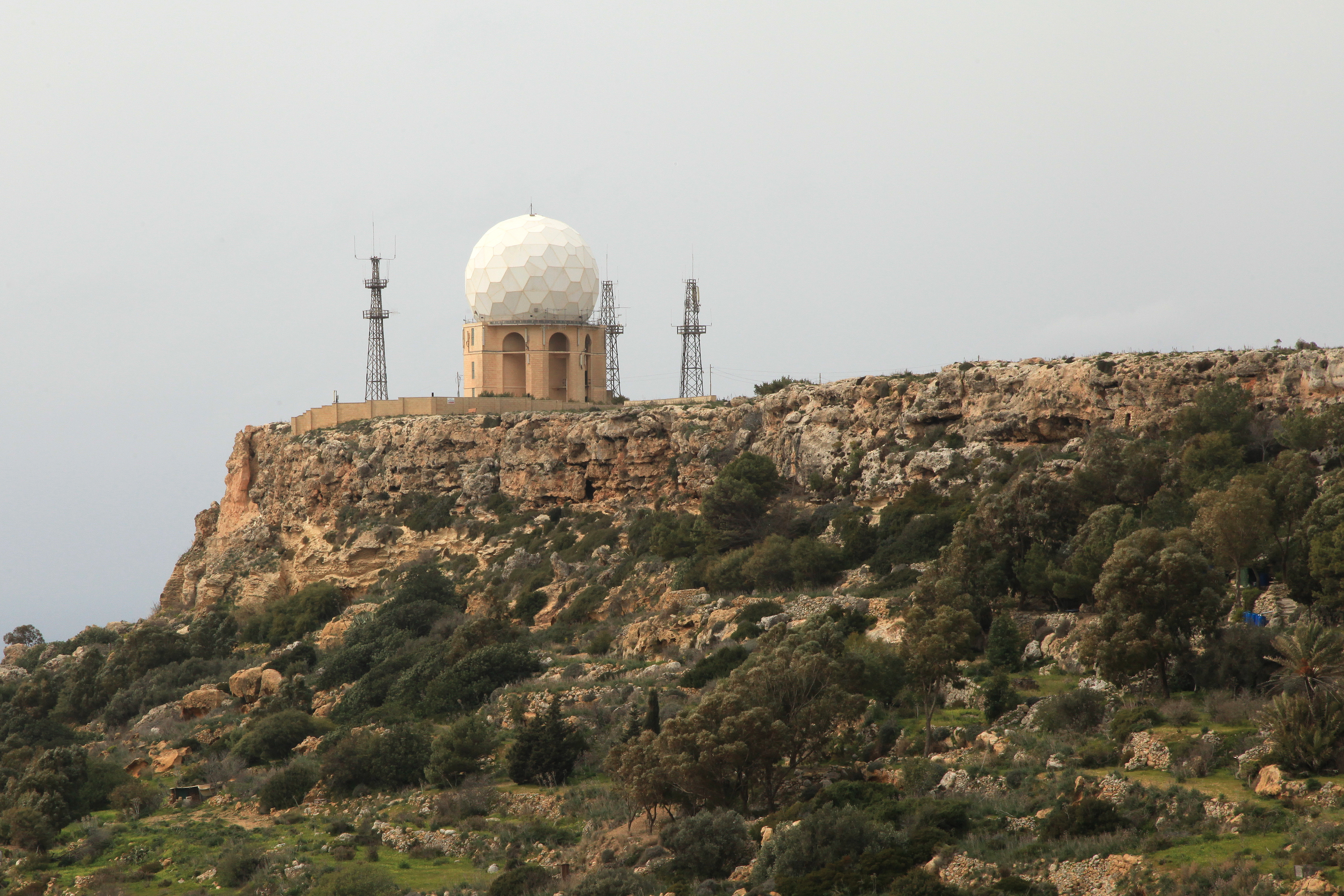
Dingli Aviation Radar

Dingli (Maltese: Ħad-Dingli) is a village in the Western Region of Malta. It is 13 kilometres (8 miles) from the capital Valletta and two kilometres (1.2 miles) from the nearest town, Rabat. The village lies on a plateau some 230 metres above sea level, near the highest point of Malta. The area provides not only open sea views over the tiny, uninhabited isle of Filfla, but is also a good vantage point over Malta. The cliffs offer views of the nearby Buskett Gardens and Verdala Palace. The population of Dingli was 3,950 in July 2024. This included 1,995 males and 1,955 females; 3,790 Maltese nationals and 160 foreign nationals.

== Etymology ==
The name Dingli is believed to be derived from the name of Sir Thomas Dingley, an English knight of the Order of St. John, who owned much of the lands in the surrounding area.

== History ==
Rock-cut tombs dating back to Phoenician, Carthaginian and Roman times have been found in the limits of Dingli. Roman baths and other remains were also found at Għajn Handful and the area of Ta' Baldu.

=== Ħal Tartarni ===
Until the early 16th century, a small village known as Ħal Tartarni existed, somewhere between Buskett and the present location of Dingli. The village was one of the ten original parishes of Malta by 1436, having a church dedicated to Saint Domenica. The original church now lies in ruins, but a new chapel with the same dedication was built nearby in 1669 and it is still standing.

The noble family Inguanez had a lot of land in the area, and employed the population of Ħal Tartarni to work the fields. Over time, the people moved closer towards the fields, abandoning the original village. The new village eventually grew to what is now Dingli. The site of Ħal Tartarni now consists of open fields.

=== Dingli Village ===
The parish of Dingli was established in 1678 and is dedicated to the Assumption of Our Lady into heaven. The church is situated in the centre of the village on a prominent position, overlooking all the surrounding area. The church which exists today was built in the form of a Latin cross in the beginning of the 20th century. The church was heavily modified in the middle of the same century, with the building of a new façade and extensions to the width of the main aisle. A more recent development, was the building of the dome during the 60s and 70s, which completed the construction work of the church. The same church was given the title of Arch parish church by a decree of the Archbishop of Malta on 22 August 2015, the eve of the titular feast of Dingli.

The feast of the Assumption in Dingli is celebrated on the first Sunday after 15 August. The titular statue of Our Lady in the parish is the fifth one in the island, made by Anton Busuttil in 1861. The statue is carved in wood and is used in a procession on the day of the feast each year carried by 8 statue bearers from the parish. The statue was restored twice: in 1934 and 1977.

Throughout the rule of the Order of Saint John, Dingli was considered to be safe from corsair attacks because it was impossible for pirates to land in the area due to the Dingli Cliffs.

The village began to see more development after the mid-20th century where the population doubled from 2,000 into the 21st century. Telephone service was introduced in private homes, and public transport began to reach the village itself instead of stopping at Rabat, although as of March 2017 no night buses actually go into Dingli, and inhabitants must stop at Rabat.

== Notable people ==
Dingli was the birthplace of several eminent personalities, including:

- Francis Ebejer, playwright and author
- Walter Ebejer, Dominican friar who was ordained Bishop of a diocese in Brazil
- Ian Borg, lawyer and current Deputy Prime Minister and Minister of Foreign Affairs and Tourism

== Main streets in Dingli ==
- Triq Ġużè Ellul Mercer
- Triq il-Buskett (Buskett Road)
- Triq il-Kbira (Main Street)
- Triq ir-Rabat (Rabat Road)
- Triq San Rokku (St. Roque Street)
- Triq il-Parroċċa (Parish Street)
