= Parish Church of the Assumption, Dingli =

Parish Church of the Assumption of the Blessed Virgin Mary into Heaven
- Knisja Parrokjali ta' Santa Marija Assunta
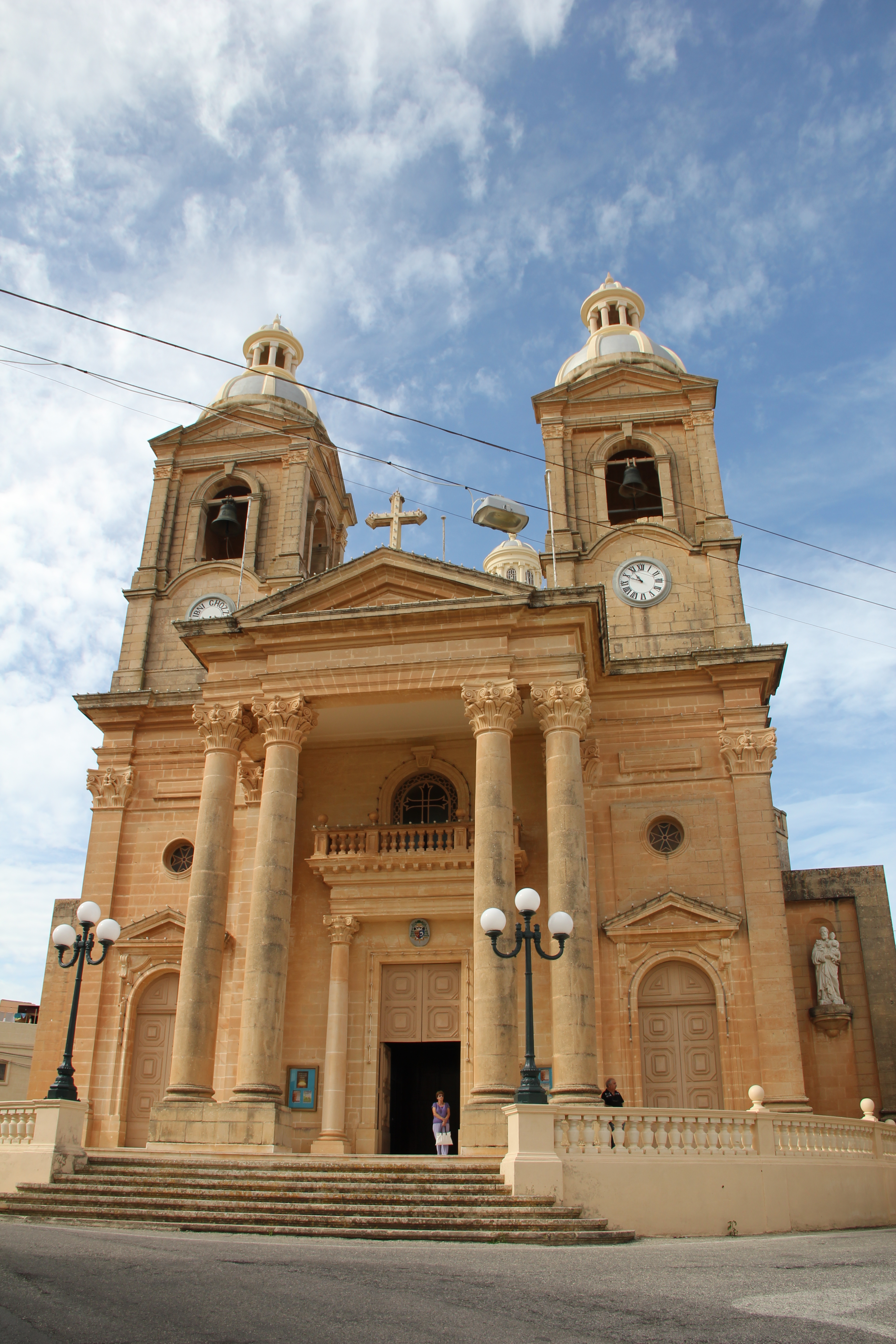
- The church's façade in 2012
- Parish Church of the Assumption of the Blessed Virgin Mary into Heaven
- 35°51′37.55″N 14°22′53.54″E
- Location: Dingli, Malta
- Denomination: Roman Catholic
- Website: parroccadingli.org

History
- Status: Parish church
- Founded: c. 16th century or earlier
- Dedication: Assumption of Mary
- Dedicated: 1908
- Consecrated: 26 March 1939

Architecture
- Functional status: Active
- Architect(s): Franġisku Zammit; Ġużè Damato (alterations); Italo Raniolo (dome)
- Years built: c. 1678–1680 (previous church); 1903–1973 (present building)

Specifications
- Length: 111 ft (34 m)
- Width: 75 ft (23 m)
- Materials: Limestone

Administration
- Archdiocese: Malta

The Parish Church of the Assumption of the Blessed Virgin Mary into Heaven (Maltese: Knisja Parrokkjali ta' Santa Marija Assunta) is a Roman Catholic parish church in Dingli, Malta, dedicated to the Assumption of Mary. It was constructed in various stages between 1903 and 1973 on the site of a previous church which had been built between 1678 and 1680.

== History ==
Before Dingli was established as a village, a settlement known as Ħal Tartarni existed in the area and it was recognized as a parish by 1436. Ħal Tartarni had a small parish church dedicated to St Domenica, but the settlement was later abandoned and in 1539 its parish was abolished and absorbed into the parish of St Paul of Rabat.

The village of Dingli subsequently began to develop nearby, and during a visit in 1575 Pietro Dusina recorded that the village had a parish church dedicated to the Assumption of Mary, although its status seems to have remained subordinate to the Rabat parish. Following a visit to the village in 1615, Bishop Baldassare Cagliares made efforts to restore Dingli's status as a parish. When the position of Bishop of Malta was vacant in the 1670s, Vicar-General Gann Anton Cauchi revoked this status, but the village was officially recognized as a parish by Bishop Miguel Jerónimo de Molina on 31 December 1678, and it has remained as such ever since.

The church building itself was originally established in around the 15th or 16th century and it was rebuilt in 1605. After the status of parish was restored in 1678, the church was enlarged through the efforts of parish priest Rajmond Mifsud and works were completed in around 1680. By the late 19th century, this church had become too small for the growing population, and in around 1900 parish priest Franġisk Muscat began proposing to construct a new church.

The architect Franġisku Zammit was appointed to design the new church in the form of a Latin cross. Construction began in 1903 on the site of the previous church, and the new building was constructed out of local limestone quarried from an area known as Ta' Wirxina. Limestone used to carve sculptural motifs was also brought from other villages including Mqabba. The works were financed by Karmenu Bugeja, and most of the construction was carried out by male residents of Dingli on a voluntary basis on Sundays.

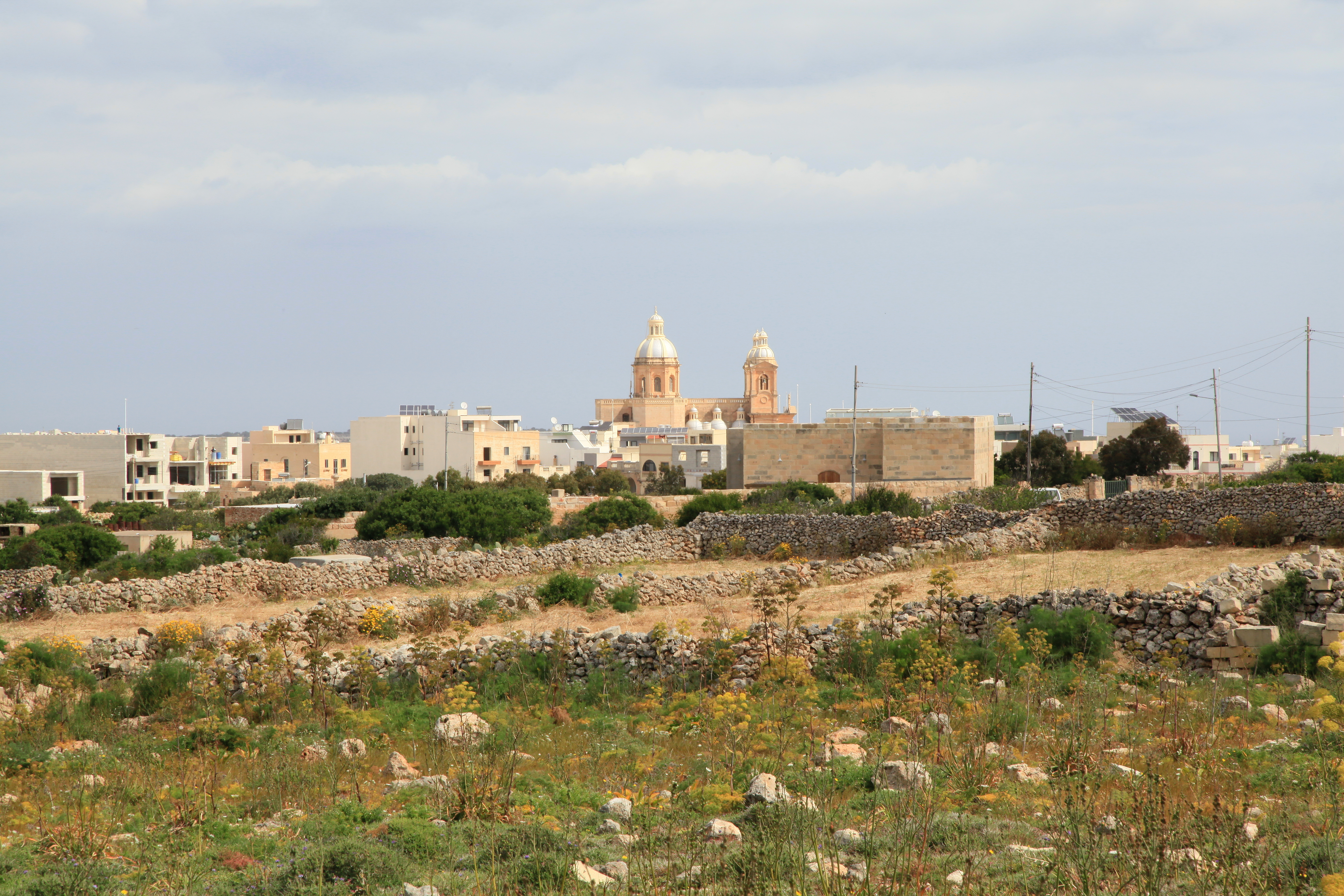
The church's dome and belfries, which dominate the Dingli skyline

The church was rededicated in 1908 and it was formally consecrated and dedicated by Bishop of Gozo Mikiel Gonzi on 26 March 1939. Parts of the building remained incomplete, and in the 1950s architect Ġużè Damato was appointed to propose further alterations to the church after some structural damage had developed. Damato's plans were submitted to Gonzi (by then Archbishop of Malta) in 1957 and they were approved.

Damato designed the side chapels, bell towers and made major alterations to the façade including the construction of a portico. After these works were completed, a dome was designed by the architect Italo Raniolo. Work on the dome began on 14 November 1969 and it was completed on 15 July 1973, and local residents participated in its construction. On 9 August 1975, Archbishop Gonzi inaugurated and blessed the dome.

Today, the church building is listed on the National Inventory of the Cultural Property of the Maltese Islands.

== Architecture ==
=== 17th century church ===
The church which was built between 1678 and 1680 had dimensions of about 25 by 50 feet (7.6 m × 15.2 m). It included five altars and a small sacristy, and it had a single small belfry.

=== Present church ===
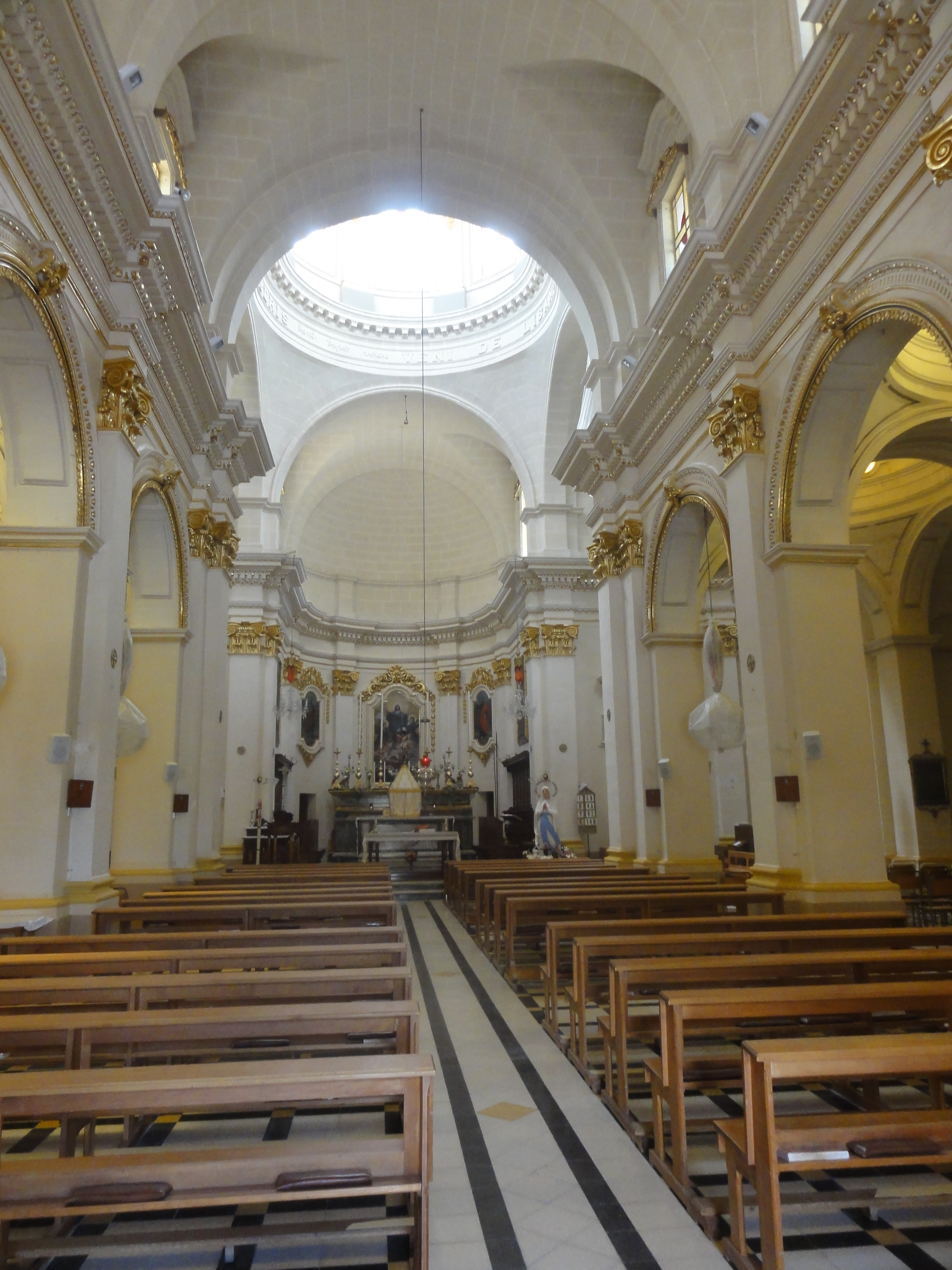
The church's interior in 2012

The present church has a cruciform plan, and it is 111 feet (34 m) long and 75 feet (23 m) wide at its extremities, while the nave has a width of about 25 feet (7.6 m). The church is topped by a dome which rests on a concrete quadrant. In front of the church there is an oval-shaped parvis.

The façade includes a portico which consists of a triangular pediment resting on columns on plinths on either side of the main entrance. Under the portico, the doorway itself is framed by additional columns which support a balcony with a balustrade. On either side of the main entrance, there are side entrances which consist of doorways topped by pediments and small windows. The façade's upper tiers include two bell towers which are topped by small domes. The bell towers contain three bells which date back to 1680, 1762 and 1880.

== Artworks ==
The church's altarpiece was commissioned during the 20th century. Some paintings and statues which were formerly located in the 17th century church are now found within the sacristy.
