= Karl Gouder =

Maltese Politician (1979–2024)

Member of Parliament
- In office June 2017 – February 2022
- Constituency: District 10
- In office April 2016 – May 2017
- In office April 2010 – January 2013

Mayor of St. Julian's
- In office 2015–2016
- Preceded by: Guido Dalli
- Succeeded by: Peter Bonello

Personal details
- Born: 15 May 1979 San Ġiljan (St. Julian's), Malta
- Died: 10 September 2024 (aged 45) Valletta, Malta
- Party: Partit Nazzjonalista
- Education: University of Malta
- Occupation: Politician

Karl Gouder (15 May 1979 – 10 September 2024) was a Maltese politician, who served as a Member of Parliament for the Nationalist Party.

== Political life ==
Gouder was first elected to St Julian's local council in 2005. Three years later, he contested both general and local elections, failing to be elected mayor by 10 votes.

In April 2010, aged 30, Gouder entered the Parliament of Malta via a casual election to replace the Speaker Louis Galea who retired from Parliament to serve at the European Court of Auditors, serving until the 2013 elections. Gouder was the first openly gay person to serve as MP in Malta, and the youngest MP in the then-ruling coalition.

Following the 2015 local elections, where PN obtained 60.51% of votes in San Ġiljan, Gouder was elected mayor of the locality. The following year he was replaced in the role by Guido Dalli, when he again entered Parliament to replace Albert Fenech. He also became the party's spokesman on culture.

At the 2017 Maltese general election Gouder was elected to Parliament for the Forza Nazzjonali coalition in the 10th District with 3,502 preferences. In November 2020 he was appointed deputy whip by the new party leader Bernard Grech.

While not re-elected in 2022, Gouder decided not to contest the casual election to replace Robert Arrigo MP, to focus on internal party organisation. Gouder headed the media arm of the Nationalist Party, leading Net TV to become the most followed private TV station.

Gouder supported PN general secretary Michael Piccinino for most of his term, and was behind the party's organisation of the 2024 European and local elections.

On 8 September 2024, Gouder had announced his interest to succeed Piccinino as PN general secretary.

== Personal life ==
Gouder studied at Stella Maris and at St Aloysius' College (where he befriended later Prime Minister Robert Abela). He obtained a degree in business at the University of Malta in 2001. He headed the University Students Council (KSU) and was part of Malta's National Youth Council (KNZ).

Gouder was an athlete, and specialised in long-distance runs. As an openly gay man, he vocally supported the introduction of civil unions and gay marriage in Malta.

=== Death ===
Gouder was found dead in Valletta, close to the former Customs House, on 10 September 2024. He was 45. The police ruled out suspicions of foul play and no cause of death was announced in media. His death was announced publicly by PN party leader Bernard Grech. Public condolences were received by the President of the Republic of Malta Myriam Spiteri Debono, the President of the European Parliament Roberta Metsola, Prime Minister Robert Abela and Malta's Speaker of Parliament Anġlu Farrugia. Nationalist Party officials claimed that Gouder was a victim of extortion, claiming this was corroborated by Robert Abela and former Labour Party president Daniel Micallef.

Over a year later, Gouder's brother Simon revealed in an interview with Times of Malta that Karl committed suicide.
