= Local councils of Malta =

Local councils of Malta Kunsilli lokali ta' Malta (Maltese)
- Category: Unitary state
- Location: Republic of Malta
- Number: 68 Local Councils
- Populations: 193 (Mdina) – 32,042 (St. Paul's Bay)
- Areas: 0.16 km^{2} (0.06 sq mi) (Senglea) – 26.6 km^{2} (10.27 sq mi) (Rabat)
- Government: Local council government, National government
- Subdivisions: Local Community Council

Since June 30, 1993, Malta has been subdivided into 68 localities, governed by local councils, Maltese: kunsilli lokali, meaning municipalities or boroughs, and considered by the Maltese as the equivalent to basic villages or towns, where appropriate. These form the most basic type of local government and are subdivisions of the country's first-level regions.

According to the Local Councils Act (Chapter 363 of the Laws of Malta), Art. 3:

(1) Every locality shall have a Council which shall have all such functions as are granted to it by this Act
...
(5) Each locality shall be referred to by the name as designated in the Second Schedule and any reference to that locality shall be by the name so designated.

== List of Maltese local councils ==
Flag	English name	Maltese name	Island	Region	Statistical District	Area (km^{2})	Population (2021 census)
	Attard	Ħ'Attard	Malta	Northern	West	6.6	12,268
	Balzan	Ħal Balzan	Malta	Northern	West	0.6	4,774
	Birgu	Il-Birgu (Città Vittoriosa)	Malta	Port	South Harbour	0.5	2,261
	Birkirkara	Birkirkara	Malta	Eastern	North Harbour	2.7	25,807
	Birżebbuġa	Birżebbuġa	Malta	Southern	South East	9.2	11,844
	Cospicua (Bormla)	Bormla (Città Cospicua)	Malta	Port	South Harbour	0.9	4,654
	Dingli	Ħad-Dingli	Malta	Western	West	5.7	3,865
Il-Fgura	Fgura	Il-Fgura	Malta	Port	South Harbour	1.1	13,066
	Floriana	Il-Furjana	Malta	Port	South East	0.94	1,985
	Fontana	Il-Fontana (It-Triq tal-Għajn)	Gozo	Gozo	Gozo & Comino	0.5	1,042
	Għajnsielem	Għajnsielem	Gozo, Comino	Gozo	Gozo & Comino	7.2	3,523
Gharb	Għarb	L-Għarb	Gozo	Gozo	Gozo & Comino	4.6	1,549
	Għargħur	Ħal Għargħur	Malta	Eastern	North	2	3,741
	Għasri	L-Għasri	Gozo	Gozo	Gozo & Comino	5	518
	Għaxaq	Ħal Għaxaq	Malta	Southern	South East	3.9	5,538
	Gudja	Il-Gudja	Malta	Southern	South East	2.3	3,229
	Gżira	Il-Gżira	Malta	Eastern	North Harbour	1.5	10,331
Hamrun	Ħamrun	Il-Ħamrun	Malta	Southern	North Harbour	1.1	10,514
	Iklin	L-Iklin	Malta	Eastern	West	1.7	3,399
	Kalkara	Il-Kalkara	Malta	Port	South Harbour	1.8	3,105
Kercem	Kerċem	Ta' Kerċem	Gozo	Gozo	Gozo & Comino	5.5	1,881
	Kirkop	Ħal Kirkop	Malta	Western	South East	1.1	2,527
	Lija	Ħal Lija	Malta	Eastern	West	1.1	3,162
	Luqa	Ħal Luqa	Malta	Southern	South Harbour	6.7	7,249
	Marsa	Il-Marsa	Malta	Southern	South Harbour	2.8	5,468
	Marsaskala	Marsaskala (Wied il-Għajn)	Malta	Southern	South East	5.4	16,804
	Marsaxlokk	Marsaxlokk	Malta	Southern	South East	4.7	3,988
	Mdina	L-Imdina (Città Notabile)	Malta	Western	West	0.9	193
	Mellieħa	Il-Mellieħa	Malta	Northern	North	22.6	12,738
	Mġarr	L-Imġarr	Malta	Northern	North	16.1	4,840
	Mosta	Il-Mosta	Malta	Northern	North	6.8	23,482
	Mqabba	L-Imqabba	Malta	Western	South East	2.6	3,525
	Msida	L-Imsida	Malta	Eastern	North Harbour	1.7	13,587
	Mtarfa	L-Imtarfa	Malta	Northern	West	0.7	2,566
	Munxar	Il-Munxar	Gozo	Gozo	Gozo & Comino	2.8	1,707
	Nadur	In-Nadur	Gozo	Gozo	Gozo & Comino	7.2	4,548
	Naxxar	In-Naxxar	Malta	Northern	North	11.6	16,912
	Paola	Raħal Ġdid	Malta	Port	South Harbour	2.5	9,339
	Pembroke	Pembroke	Malta	Eastern	North Harbour	2.3	3,545
	Pietà	Tal-Pietà	Malta	Eastern	North Harbour	0.5	5,892
	Qala	Il-Qala	Gozo	Gozo	Gozo & Comino	5.9	2,300
	Qormi	Ħal Qormi (Città Pinto)	Malta	Southern	North Harbour	5	18,099
	Qrendi	Il-Qrendi	Malta	Western	South East	4.9	3,148
	Rabat	Ir-Rabat	Malta	Western	West	26.6	11,936
	Safi	Ħal Safi	Malta	Western	South East	2.3	2,641
San Ġiljan	St. Julian's	San Ġiljan	Malta	Eastern	North Harbour	1.6	11,653
Saint Paul's Bay	St. Paul's Bay	San Pawl il-Baħar	Malta	Northern	North	14.47	32,042
	San Ġwann	San Ġwann	Malta	Northern	North Harbour	2.6	14,244
	San Lawrenz	San Lawrenz	Gozo	Gozo	Gozo & Comino	3.6	772
	Sannat	Ta' Sannat	Gozo	Gozo	Gozo & Comino	3.8	2,186
Santa Lucija	Santa Luċija	Santa Luċija	Malta	Southern	South Harbour	0.7	2,617
	Santa Venera	Santa Venera	Malta	Southern	North Harbour	0.9	8,834
Isla	Senglea	L-Isla (Città Senglea, Città Invicta)	Malta	Port	South Harbour	0.2	2,304
	Siġġiewi	Is-Siġġiewi (Città Ferdinand)	Malta	Western	West	19.9	9,318
	Sliema	Tas-Sliema	Malta	Eastern	North Harbour	1.3	19,655
	Swieqi	Is-Swieqi	Malta	Eastern	North Harbour	3.1	13,044
	Tarxien	Ħal Tarxien	Malta	Port	South Harbour	0.9	9,464
Valletta, Malta	Valletta	Il-Belt Valletta (Città Umillisima)	Malta	Port	South Harbour	0.8	5,157
Victoria, Gozo	Victoria (Rabat)	Ir-Rabat, Għawdex (Città Vittoria)	Gozo	Gozo	Gozo & Comino	2.9	7,242
	Ta' Xbiex	Ta' Xbiex	Malta	Eastern	North Harbour	0.8	2,092
Xaghra	Xagħra	Ix-Xagħra	Gozo	Gozo	Gozo & Comino	7.6	5,161
Xewkija, Malta	Xewkija	Ix-Xewkija	Gozo	Gozo	Gozo & Comino	4.5	3,555
Xghajra	Xgħajra	Ix-Xgħajra	Malta	Port	South Harbour	1	2,192
	Żabbar	Ħaż-Żabbar (Città Hompesch)	Malta	Port	South Harbour	5.3	17,148
Zebbug, Malta	Żebbuġ	Ħaż-Żebbuġ (Città Rohan)	Malta	Western	West	8.7	13,785
Żebbuġ, Gozo	Żebbuġ	Iż-Żebbuġ	Gozo	Gozo	Gozo & Comino	7.6	3,303
	Żejtun	Iż-Żejtun (Città Beland)	Malta	Southern	South East	7.4	12,409
Zurrieq	Żurrieq	Iż-Żurrieq	Malta	Western	South East	10.5	12,295

=== Political affiliation of mayors ===
Party	Localities
Labour Party	40 / 68
Nationalist Party	23 / 68
Għarb First	1 / 68
Floriana First	1 / 68
Independent	2 / 68

== List of Maltese and Gozitan local communities councils ==
Elections for these administrative committees were first ever held 27 March 2010, in the first 8 hamlets listed in this list, the rest were held in later in June.

- Bubaqra Administrative Committee in Żurrieq
- Fleur-de-Lys Administrative Committee in Birkirkara
- Kappara Administrative Committee in San Ġwann
- Madliena Administrative Committee in Swieqi
- Marsalforn Administrative Committee in Żebbuġ (Gozo)
- Paceville Administrative Committee in St. Julian's
- Santa Luċija Administrative Committee in Kerċem (Gozo)
- Xlendi Administrative Committee in Munxar (Gozo)
- Baħar iċ-Ċagħaq Administrative Committee in Naxxar
- Baħrija Administrative Committee in Rabat
- Burmarrad and Wardija Administrative Committee in St. Paul's Bay
- Gwardamanġa Administrative Committee in Pietà
- Ħal Farruġ Administrative Committee in Luqa
- San Pietru Administrative Committee in Żabbar
- Swatar Administrative Committee in Birkirkara and Msida
- Tal-Virtù Administrative Committee in Rabat

=== Political affiliation of members administrative committees ===
==== 2010 elections (March and June results merged) ====
Party	Committees Members
Partit Nazzjonalista	45 / 80
Partit Laburista	28 / 80
Association for the Common Purpose	5 / 80
Better Environment for Bumarrad	1 / 80
Independents	1 / 80
Total:	80 seats

==== 2014 election ====
Party	Committees Members
Partit Nazzjonalista	49 / 75
Partit Laburista	22 / 75
Association for the Common Purpose	4 / 75
Total:	75 seats

=== Other recognised hamlets without a local community committee ===
- Albert Town, Marsa
- Bengħisa, Birżebbuġa
- Bidnija in Mosta/Mġarr
- Bir id-Deheb in Żejtun/Għaxaq
- Blata l-Bajda in Ħamrun/Marsa
- Tal-Blata l-Għolja in Mosta
- Buġibba in St. Paul's Bay
- Bulebel iż-Żgħir in Żabbar
- Buskett in Dingli/Siġġiewi
- Ġebel San Martin in Żejtun
- Għadira in Mellieħa
- Tal-Ibraġ in Swieqi
- Magħtab in Naxxar
- Manikata in Mellieħa
- Pwales in St. Paul's Bay
- Qajjenza in Birżebbuġa
- Qawra in St. Paul's Bay
- Tar-Rabbat in Ħamrun
- Salina in Naxxar
- San Martin in St. Paul's Bay
- Santa Margerita in Mosta
- Santa Maria Estate in Mellieħa
- Ta' Ganza in Żejtun
- Ta' Ġiorni in San Ġiljan
- Ta' Kassja in Gozo
- Ta' Taħt iċ-Ċint in Żurrieq
- Tal-Barmil in Gozo
- Tal-Bebbux in Żurrieq
- Tal-Ħawli in Birgu
- Tal-Millieri in Għaxaq
- Tal-Plier in Żabbar
- Tal-Qattus (Birkirkara) in Birkirkara
- Tal-Qattus (Għaxaq) in Għaxaq
- Tas-Salib in Mellieħa
- Ta' Żwejt in San Ġwann
- Victoria Gardens in Swieqi
- Wied iż-Żurrieq in Qrendi
- Xemxija in St. Paul's Bay
- Ix-Xwieki in Għargħur
- Żebbiegħ in Mġarr
- Ta' Żokkrija in Mosta

== See also ==
- 2005 Maltese local council elections
- 2006 Maltese local council elections
- 2007 Maltese local council elections
- 2008 Maltese local council elections
- 2009 Maltese local council elections
- Maltese local council elections, 2010
- 2012 Maltese local council elections
- 2015 Maltese local council elections
- List of cities in Malta
- List of mayors of Malta
- ISO 3166-2:MT
