= Demographics of Malta =

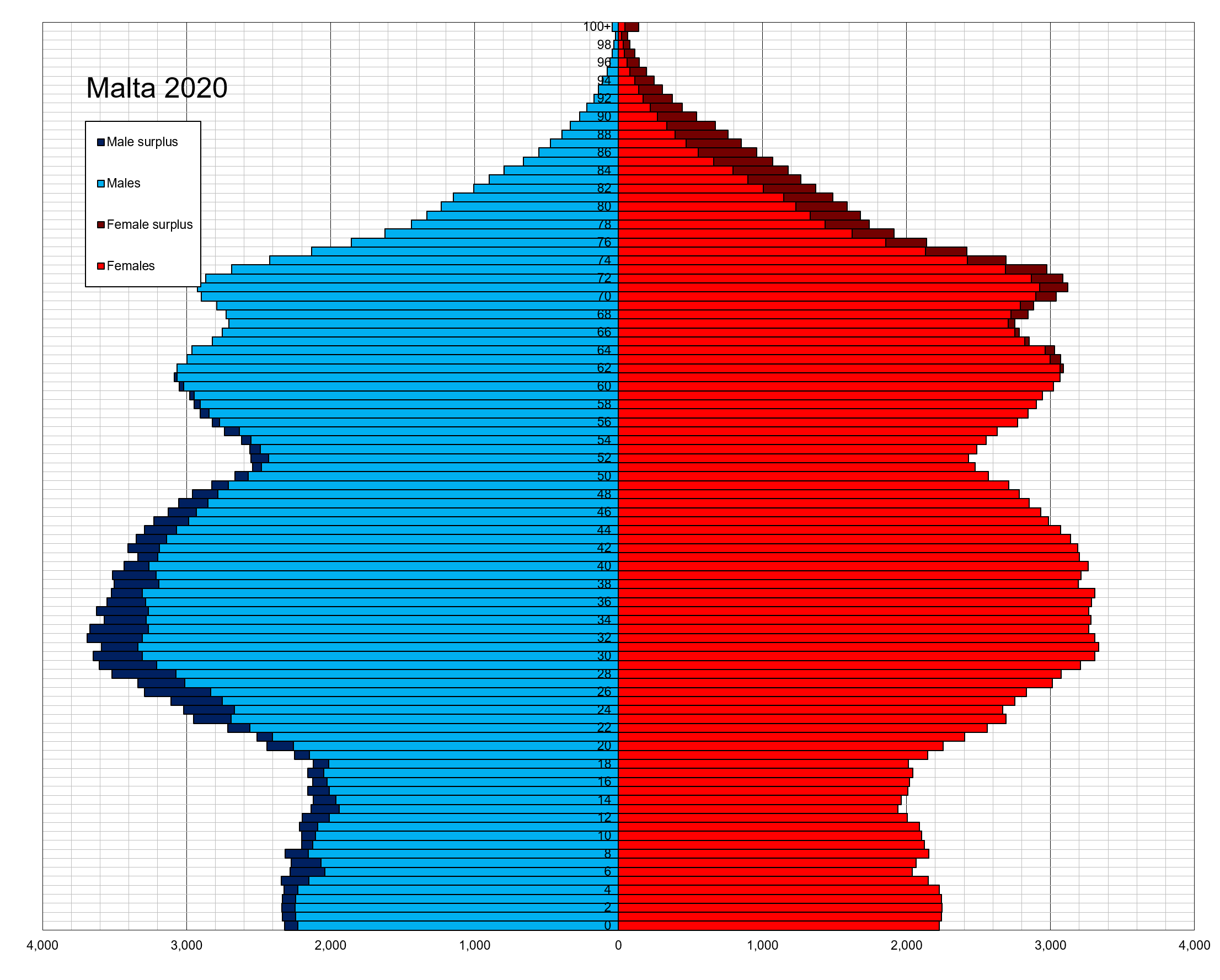
- Population pyramid of Malta in 2020
- Population: 519,186 (2021 census)
- Growth rate: 0.67% (2022 est.)
- Birth rate: 8.1 births/1,000 population (2023)
- Death rate: 7.3 deaths/1,000 population
- Life expectancy: 83.2 years
  - male: 81.11 years
  - female: 85.38 years
- Fertility rate: 1.07 children born/woman (2023)
- Infant mortality: 4.53 deaths/1,000 live births
- Net migration rate: 5.49 migrant(s)/1,000 population
- Immigrant share: 37.0% (2024)

Sex ratio
- Total: 1.02 male(s)/female (2022 est.)
- At birth: 1.04 male(s)/female

Nationality
- Nationality: Maltese

Language
- Official: Maltese and English

Demographic features of the population of Malta include population density, ethnicity, religious affiliations and other aspects of the population.

Census population and average annual growth rate

Year	Pop.	±% p.a.
1842	114,499	—
1851	123,496	+0.84%
1861	134,055	+0.82%
1871	141,775	+0.56%
1881	149,782	+0.55%
1891	165,037	+0.97%
1901	184,742	+1.13%
1911	211,564	+1.36%
1921	212,258	+0.03%

Year	Pop.	±% p.a.
1931	241,621	+1.30%
1948	305,991	+1.40%
1957	319,620	+0.49%
1967	314,216	−0.17%
1985	345,418	+0.53%
1995	378,132	+0.91%
2005	404,962	+0.69%
2011	417,432	+0.51%
2021	519,562	+2.21%

Source: 2018 data; 2021 census

== Characteristics ==
Malta is the most densely populated country in the EU and one of the most densely populated countries in the world, with about 1,265 inhabitants per square kilometre (3,280 inhabitants/mi^{2}). This compares with about 32 per square kilometre (85 per square mile) for the United States.

Inhabited since prehistoric times, Malta was first colonized by Sicilians. Subsequently, Phoenicians, Romans, Byzantines, Arabs in 870 AD who may have completely depopulated the islands but in 1224 were themselves expelled from Malta, Normans, Sicilians, Spanish, French and the British have influenced Maltese life and culture to varying degrees.

Roman Catholicism is established by law as the religion of Malta with 98%; however, full liberty of conscience and freedom of worship is guaranteed, and a number of faiths have places of worship on the island (rather small groups, a combined total of 2% of the people are Protestants, Eastern Orthodox, Muslims and Jews).

Malta has two official languages--Maltese (a Semitic language derived from Siculo-Arabic and heavily influenced by Sicilian and Italian), and English, which includes a local dialect, Maltese English. Both languages are compulsory subjects in Maltese primary and secondary schools. A large portion of the population is also fluent in Italian, which was, until 1936, the national language of Malta. The literacy rate has reached 93%, compared to 63% in 1946. Schooling is compulsory until age 16.

=== Age distribution ===
Since 2000, the shift in the age composition towards an older population continued to materialise. In fact, the average age of the Maltese population increased from 38.5 in 2005 to 40.5 in 2011. This resulted from the increase in the number of persons aged 55 and over, together with a decrease in the number of persons under 25 years of age. The average in Gozo and Comino (41.6 years) was higher than that observed for Malta. Persons aged 65 and over more represent 16.3% of the total population in 2011, compared to 13.7% in 2005. In contrast, persons aged 14 and under make up 14.8% of the population in 2011, compared to 17.2% in 2005.

=== Migrant background and foreign nationality ===
Foreign nationals in Malta

As of 2016 and 2017, the numbers of selected groups of resident foreign nationals (non-naturalized residents) in Malta were as follows:

This list does not include foreign nationals who acquired Maltese nationality and foreign nationals without resident status.

Rank	Nationality	Population (2016)	Population (2017)
	Total	30,000+	
	(European Union) EU nationals	22,000+	
1	(European Union) Italy	5,180	
2	United Kingdom	3,985	
3	Libya		3,622
4	Serbia		2,757
5	Philippines		2,407
6	(European Union) Bulgaria	2,044	
7	Russia		2,027
8	Somalia		1,845
9	(European Union) Hungary	1,308	
10	Syria		1,289
11	(European Union) Romania	1,262	
12	(European Union) Spain	1,119	
13	China		1,090
14	(European Union) Sweden	1,085	
15	Eritrea		1,057
16	(European Union) Germany	991	
17	Ukraine		896
18	(European Union) France	879	
19	India		819
20	(European Union) Poland	719	
21	(European Union) Netherlands	466	
22	(European Union) Greece	379	
23	(European Union) Slovakia	338	
24	(European Union) Austria	332	
25	(European Union) Finland	321	
26	(European Union) Portugal	297	
27	(European Union) Czech Republic	296	
28	(European Union) (Republic of Ireland) Ireland	281	
29	(European Union) Latvia	276	
30	(European Union) Lithuania	213	
31	(European Union) Denmark	204	
32	(European Union) Belgium	188	
33	(European Union) Estonia	120	
34	(European Union) Slovenia	106	
35	(European Union) Croatia	100	
	Other non-EU nationals	400+	

=== Emigration ===
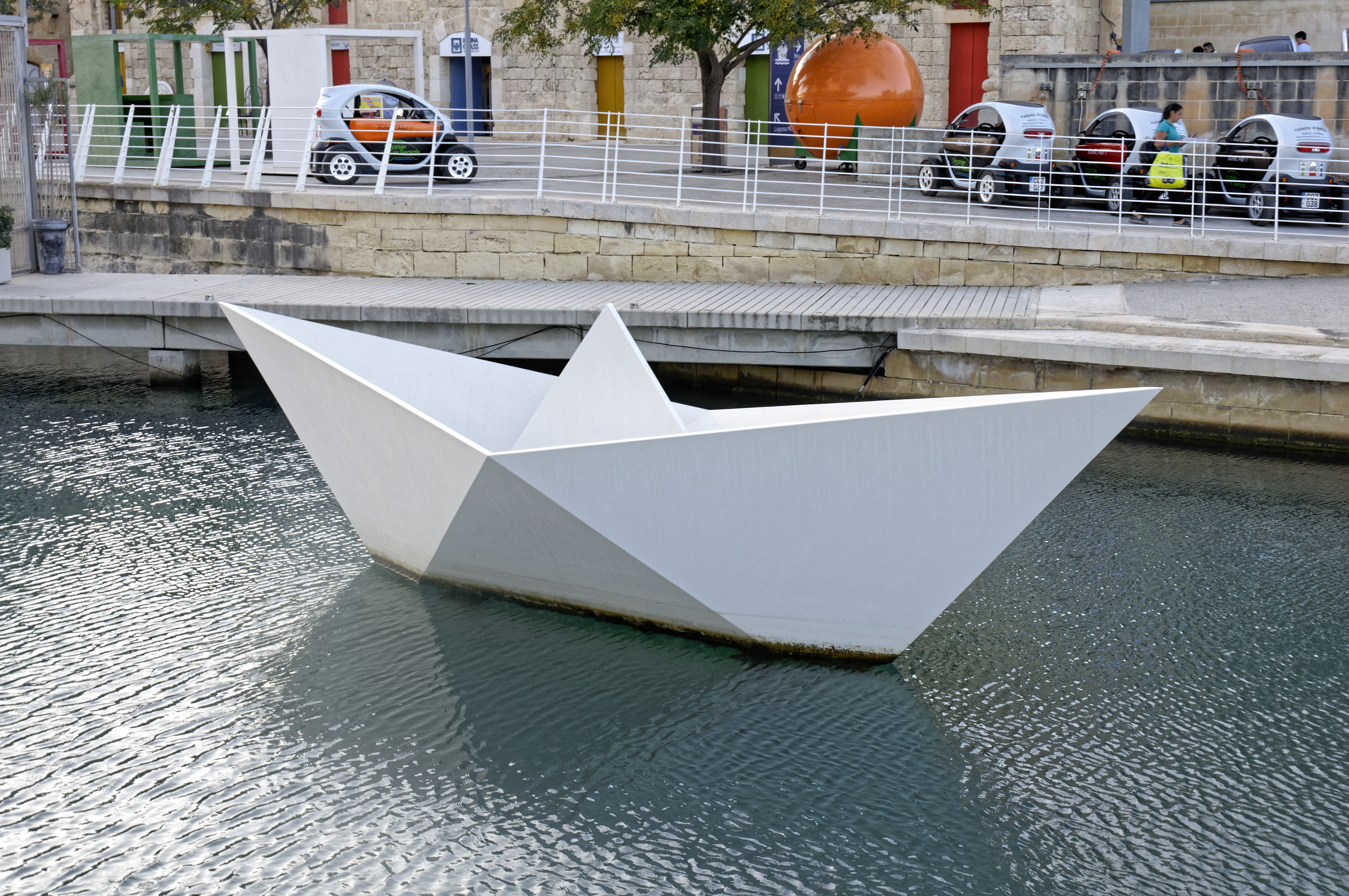
Child Migrants' Memorial at the Valletta Waterfront, commemorating the 310 Maltese child migrants who travelled to Australia between 1950 and 1965.

Malta has long been a country of emigration, with big Maltese communities in English-speaking countries abroad. Mass emigration picked up in the 19th century, reaching its peak in the decades after World War II.

In the nineteenth century, most migration from Malta was to North Africa and the Middle East (particularly Algeria, Tunisia and Egypt), although rates of return migration to Malta were high. Nonetheless, Maltese communities formed in these regions. By 1900, for example, British consular estimates suggest that there were 15,326 Maltese in Tunisia. There is little trace left of the Maltese communities in North Africa, most of them having been displaced, after the rise of independence movements, to places like Marseille, the United Kingdom or Australia.

After World War II, Malta's Emigration Department would assist emigrants with the cost of their travel. Between 1948 and 1967, 30 per cent of the population emigrated. Between 1946 and the late 1970s, over 140,000 people left Malta on the assisted passage scheme, with 57.6 per cent migrating to Australia, 22 per cent to the UK, 13 per cent to Canada and 7 per cent to the United States. (See also Maltese Australians; Maltese people in the United Kingdom)

46,998 Maltese-born residents were recorded by the 2001 Australian Census, 30,178 by the 2001 UK Census, 9,525 by the 2001 Canadian Census and 9,080 by the 2000 United States census.

Emigration dropped dramatically after the mid-1970s and has since ceased to be a social phenomenon of significance. However, since Malta joined the EU in 2004 expatriate communities emerged in a number of European countries particularly in Belgium and Luxembourg. At the same time, Malta is becoming more and more attractive for communities of immigrants, both from Western and Northern Europe (Italians, British) and from Eastern Europe (Serbians).

=== Immigration ===
Foreign population in Malta
Year	Population	% total
2005	12,112	3.0%
2011	20,289	4.9%
2021	115,449	22.2%

Most of the foreign community in Malta, predominantly active or retired British nationals and their dependents, is centred on Sliema and surrounding modern suburbs. Other smaller foreign groups include Italians, French, and Lebanese, many of whom have assimilated into the Maltese nation over the decades.

Since the late 20th century, Malta has become a transit country for migration routes from Africa towards Europe. As a member of the European Union and of the Schengen agreement, Malta is bound by the Dublin Regulation to process all claims for asylum by those asylum seekers that enter EU territory for the first time in Malta.

Irregular migrants (formal Maltese: immigranti irregolari, informal: klandestini) who land in Malta are subject to a compulsory detention policy, being held in several camps organised by the Armed Forces of Malta (AFM), including those near Ħal Far and Ħal Safi. The compulsory detention policy has been denounced by several NGOs, and in July 2010, the European Court of Human Rights found that Malta's detention of migrants was arbitrary, lacking in adequate procedures to challenge detention, and in breach of its obligations under the European Convention on Human Rights.

Very few migrants arrived in Malta in 2015, despite the fact that the rest Europe was experiencing a migrant crisis. Most migrants who were rescued between Libya and Malta were taken to Italy, and some refused to be brought to Malta.

=== Net Migration ===
Net migration for Malta (2012–present)
Year	Immigration	Emigration	Net migration
2012	9,152	5,946	3,206
2013	12,446	6,550	5,896
2014	15,928	6,200	9,728
2015	18,202	8,225	9,977
2016	18,116	9,510	8,606
2017	22,750	8,036	14,714
2018	27,394	10,019	17,375
2019	29,304	8,079	21,225
2020	14,751	13,804	947
2021	16,963	13,146	3,817
2022	34,964	13,116	21,848
2023	42,239	21,279	20,960
2024	34,033	23,419	10,614

== Ethnicity ==
Ethnic groups in Malta by census year
Ethnic group	2021 census		2031 census	
Ethnic group	Number	%	Number	%
Caucasian	462,997	89.13%	–	–
Asian	27,019	5.20%	–	–
Arab	8,756	1.69%	–	–
African	8,178	1.57%	–	–
Hispanic or Latino	6,511	1.25%	–	–
More than one racial origin	6,101	1.17%	–	–
Total	519,562	100.00%	–	–

== Language ==
Main language spoken in Malta (population aged 5 and over)
Language	2021 census		2031 census	
Language	Number	%	Number	%
Maltese	352,346	70.86%	–	–
English	50,242	10.10%	–	–
Italian	13,397	2.69%	–	–
German	10,427	2.10%	–	–
French	4,521	0.91%	–	–
Arabic	8,514	1.71%	–	–
Other	57,818	11.63%	–	–
Total	497,265	100.00%	–	–

== Religion ==
Religion in Malta (population aged 15 and over)
Religion	2021 census		2031 census	
Religion	Number	%	Number	%
Roman Catholicism	373,304	82.66%	–	–
Islam	17,454	3.86%	–	–
Orthodoxy	16,457	3.64%	–	–
Hinduism	6,411	1.42%	–	–
Church of England	5,706	1.26%	–	–
Protestantism	4,516	1.00%	–	–
Buddhism	2,495	0.55%	–	–
Judaism	1,249	0.28%	–	–
Other religious groups	911	0.20%	–	–
No religious affiliation	23,243	5.14%	–	–
Total	451,746	100.00%	–	–

== CIA World Factbook demographic statistics ==
The following demographic statistics are from the CIA World Factbook, unless otherwise indicated.

Largest cities:

- Birkirkara
- Mosta
- Qormi
- Żabbar
- San Pawl il-Baħar
- Sliema
- San Ġwann
- Rabat
- Żejtun
- Naxxar

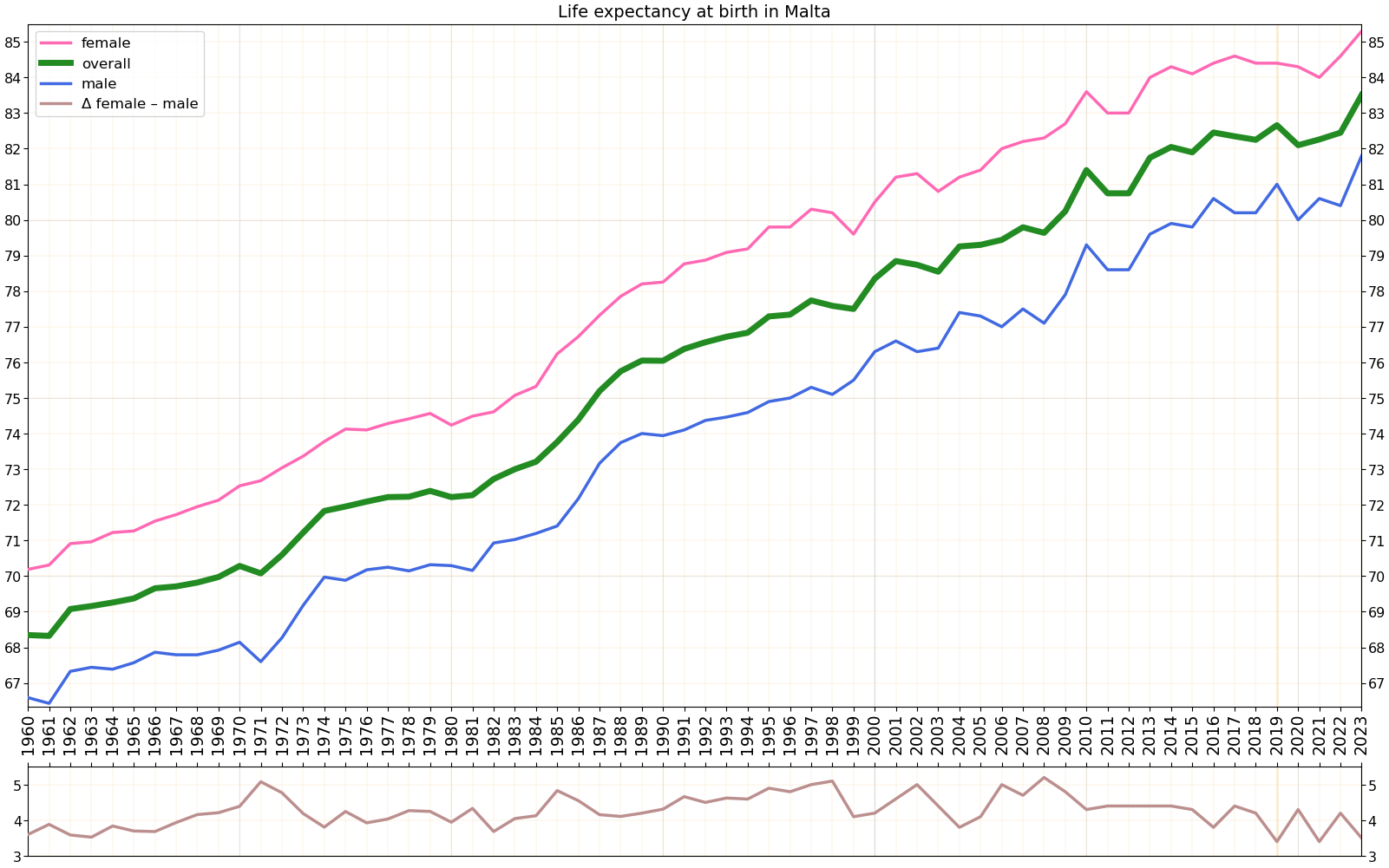
Life expectancy at birth in Malta

Life expectancy at birth:
total population: 79.01 years
male: 76.83 years
female: 81.31 years (2006 est.)

Total fertility rate: 1.42 children born/woman (2015 est.)

State religion: Roman Catholic Church in Malta 88.6% (2016 est.)

Languages: Maltese (official de facto), English (official de jure), Italian (widely understood)

== Vital statistics ==
Statistics from United Nations and National Statistics Office Malta

	Average population	Live births	Deaths	Natural change	Crude birth rate (per 1000)	Crude death rate (per 1000)	Natural change (per 1000)	Crude migration change (per 1000)	Fertility rate
1932	246,000	8,000	5,150	2,850	32.5	20.9	11.6		
1933	250,000	8,300	5,100	3,200	33.2	20.4	12.8	3.2	
1934	254,000	8,544	5,702	2,842	33.6	22.4	11.2	4.6	
1935	256,000	8,701	6,018	2,683	34.0	23.5	10.5	-2.7	
1936	259,000	8,875	4,617	4,258	34.3	17.8	16.4	-4.9	
1937	263,000	8,879	5,304	3,575	33.8	20.2	13.6	1.6	
1938	267,000	8,704	5,399	3,305	32.6	20.2	12.4	2.6	
1939	269,000	8,930	5,385	3,545	33.2	20.0	13.2	-5.7	
1940	270,000	8,808	6,144	2,664	32.6	22.8	9.9	-6.2	
1941	271,000	7,352	6,444	908	27.1	23.8	3.4	0.3	
1942	270,000	6,768	8,603	-1,835	25.1	31.9	-6.8	3.1	
1943	271,000	8,452	5,578	2,874	31.2	20.6	10.6	-6.9	
1944	276,000	10,963	3,700	7,263	39.7	13.4	26.3	-8.2	
1945	283,000	10,998	4,016	6,982	38.9	14.2	24.7	0.1	
1946	291,000	11,304	4,050	7,254	38.8	13.9	24.9	2.6	
1947	300,000	11,612	3,838	7,774	38.7	12.8	25.9	4.1	
1948	306,000	11,029	3,737	7,292	36.0	12.2	23.8	-4.2	
1949	311,000	10,590	3,326	7,264	34.1	10.7	23.4	-7.3	
1950	312,000	10,281	3,224	7,057	33.0	10.3	22.6	-19.3	
1951	313,000	9,511	3,476	6,035	30.4	11.1	19.3	-16.1	
1952	317,000	9,226	3,365	5,861	29.1	10.6	18.5	-5.9	
1953	317,000	8,977	2,848	6,129	28.3	9.0	19.3	-19.3	
1954	320,000	8,991	3,071	5,920	28.1	9.6	18.5	-9.1	
1955	314,000	8,560	2,683	5,877	27.3	8.5	18.7	-37.8	
1956	314,000	8,418	2,918	5,500	26.8	9.3	17.5	-17.5	
1957	319,000	8,794	2,955	5,839	27.6	9.3	18.3	-2.6	
1958	322,000	8,528	2,657	5,871	26.5	8.3	18.2	-8.9	
1959	325,000	8,499	2,836	5,663	26.2	8.7	17.4	-8.2	
1960	327,200	8,565	2,819	5,746	26.2	8.6	17.6	-10.8	
1961	325,900	7,674	2,937	4,737	23.6	9.0	14.6	-18.5	
1962	324,600	7,513	2,840	4,673	23.2	8.8	14.4	-18.4	
1963	323,200	6,672	2,981	3,691	20.7	9.2	11.4	-15.8	
1964	321,900	6,394	2,756	3,638	19.9	8.6	11.3	-15.3	
1965	320,600	5,628	3,001	2,627	17.7	9.4	8.2	-12.2	
1966	317,000	5,340	2,865	2,475	16.9	9.1	7.9	-19.2	
1967	313,400	5,309	2,985	2,324	17.0	9.6	7.5	-18.9	
1968	309,700	5,143	2,883	2,260	16.7	9.4	7.3	-19.2	
1969	306,100	5,096	3,024	2,072	16.7	9.9	6.8	-18.5	
1970	302,500	5,314	3,070	2,244	17.6	10.1	7.4	-19.3	
1971	302,800	5,562	3,090	2,472	18.4	10.2	8.2	-7.2	
1972	302,600	5,385	2,891	2,494	17.8	9.6	8.2	-8.9	
1973	302,300	5,272	2,935	2,337	17.4	9.7	7.7	-8.7	
1974	302,100	5,440	2,747	2,693	18.0	9.1	8.9	-9.6	
1975	301,892	5,724	2,900	2,824	18.8	9.5	9.3	-10	
1976	306,551	5,696	2,967	2,729	18.6	9.7	8.9	6.3	
1977	304,997	5,793	2,872	2,921	18.9	9.4	9.5	-14.7	2.14
1978	308,942	5,641	3,263	2,378	18.2	10.5	7.7	5.1	2.05
1979	311,421	5,823	2,968	2,855	18.6	9.5	9.1	-1.2	2.10
1980	315,262	5,602	3,216	2,386	17.7	10.2	7.5	4.6	1.99
1981	318,028	5,292	3,062	2,230	16.6	9.6	7.0	1.7	1.87
1982	319,936	5,912	3,050	2,862	18.1	9.4	8.8	-3	
1983	331,859	5,651	3,137	2,514	17.1	9.5	7.6	28.4	
1984	329,189	5,571	2,903	2,668	16.9	8.8	8.1	-16.2	1.95
1985	331,997	5,430	2,837	2,593	16.1	8.4	7.7	0.6	1.95
1986	340,907	5,245	2,824	2,421	15.3	8.3	7.1	19	1.93
1987	343,334	5,314	2,908	2,406	15.4	8.4	7.0	0.1	1.97
1988	345,636	5,533	2,708	2,825	15.9	7.8	8.1	-1.5	2.06
1989	349,014	5,584	2,610	2,974	15.9	7.4	8.5	1.2	2.10
1990	352,430	5,368	2,745	2,623	15.2	7.8	7.4		2.04
1991	361,908	5,302	2,875	2,427	14.6	7.9	6.7	19.5	1.99
1992	365,781	5,474	2,900	2,574	14.9	7.9	7.0	3.6	2.07
1993	369,455	5,147	2,692	2,455	13.9	7.3	6.6	3.3	1.97
1994	373,161	4,826	2,698	2,128	12.9	7.2	5.7	4.2	1.84
1995	376,433	4,613	2,708	1,905	12.2	7.2	5.0	3.6	1.77
1996	378,404	5,038	2,759	2,279	13.3	7.3	6.0	-0.8	1.99
1997	381,405	4,848	2,865	1,983	12.7	7.5	5.2	2.7	1.93
1998	384,176	4,670	3,018	1,652	12.1	7.8	4.3	2.9	1.84
1999	386,397	4,403	3,079	1,324	11.4	7.9	3.4	2.3	1.73
2000	388,759	4,392	2,941	1,451	11.3	7.5	3.7	2.3	1.68
2001	391,415	3,957	2,904	1,053	10.1	7.4	2.7	4.1	1.48
2002	394,641	3,918	3,006	912	9.9	7.6	2.3	5.9	1.45
2003	397,296	4,050	3,146	904	10.2	7.9	2.3	4.4	1.48
2004	399,867	3,887	3,006	881	9.7	7.5	2.2	4.2	1.39
2005	402,668	3,858	3,132	726	9.6	7.8	1.8	5.2	1.38
2006	404,999	3,779	3,216	563	9.3	7.9	1.4	4.4	1.36
2007	405,616	3,765	3,111	654	9.3	7.6	1.6	-0.1	1.35
2008	407,832	4,013	3,243	770	9.8	7.9	1.9	3.5	1.43
2009	410,926	4,029	3,221	808	9.8	7.8	2.0	5.6	1.42
2010	414,027	3,898	3,010	888	9.4	7.3	2.1	5.3	1.36
2011	414,989	4,165	3,267	898	10.0	7.8	2.2	0.2	1.45
2012	417,546	4,130	3,418	712	9.8	8.1	1.7	4.4	1.42
2013	422,509	4,032	3,236	796	9.5	7.6	1.9	9.9	1.36
2014	429,424	4,191	3,270	921	9.6	7.5	2.1	14	1.38
2015	439,691	4,325	3,442	883	9.7	7.7	2.0	21.3	1.37
2016	450,415	4,476	3,342	1,134	9.8	7.3	2.5	21.3	1.37
2017	460,297	4,319	3,571	748	9.2	7.6	1.6	19.8	1.26
2018	475,701	4,444	3,688	756	9.2	7.6	1.6	30.8	1.23
2019	493,559	4,350	3,688	662	8.6	7.3	1.3	34.8	1.14
2020	516,125	4,414	4,084	330	8.6	7.9	0.6	40.2	1.13
2021	520,174	4,395	4,163	232	8.5	8.1	0.4	2.5	1.13
2022	542,051	4,309	4,230	79	8.3	8.0	0.3	9.3	1.08
2023	563,443	4,462	4,030	432	8.1	7.3	0.8	38	1.07
2024	574,250	4,374	4,181	193	7.6	7.3	0.3		1.00
2025	588,254	4,338	4,240	98	7.5	7.3	0.2		0.98

=== Structure of the population ===
Population by Sex and Age Group (Census 20.XI.2011):

Age group	Male	Female	Total	%
Total	207 625	209 807	417 432	100
0–4	10 347	9 714	20 061	4.81
5–9	9 971	9 448	19 419	4.65
10–14	11 355	10 893	22 248	5.33
15–19	13 509	12 673	26 182	6.27
20–24	15 062	14 388	29 450	7.06
25–29	15 722	14 598	30 320	7.26
30–34	15 641	14 553	30 194	7.23
35–39	14 757	14 042	28 799	6.90
40–44	12 840	12 396	25 236	6.05
45–49	13 574	13 321	26 895	6.44
50–54	15 292	15 304	30 596	7.33
55–59	14 655	14 591	29 246	7.01
60–64	15 130	15 465	30 595	7.33
65–69	11 429	12 299	23 728	5.68
70–74	7 389	8 816	16 205	3.88
75–79	5 579	7 708	13 287	3.18
80–84	3 181	5 313	8 494	2.03
85–89	1 622	2 945	4 567	1.09
90–94	480	1 103	1 583	0.38
95–99	82	214	296	0.07
100+	8	23	31	0.01
Age group	Male	Female	Total	Percent
0–14	31 673	30 055	61 728	14.79
15–64	146 182	141 331	287 513	68.88
65+	29 770	38 421	68 191	16.34

Population Estimates by Sex and Age Group (01.I.2021) (Including civilian nationals temporarily outside the country.):

Age group	Male	Female	Total	%
Total	266 939	249 161	516 100	100
0–4	12 184	11 317	23 501	4.55
5–9	12 348	11 434	23 782	4.61
10–14	11 403	10 626	22 029	4.27
15–19	11 014	10 392	21 406	4.15
20–24	16 408	14 129	30 537	5.92
25–29	24 459	20 409	44 868	8.69
30–34	25 930	21 822	47 752	9.25
35–39	23 597	19 532	43 129	8.36
40–44	20 810	17 639	38 449	7.45
45–49	17 950	15 572	33 522	6.50
50–54	14 946	13 455	28 401	5.50
55–59	15 447	14 499	29 946	5.80
60–64	15 714	15 646	31 360	6.08
65–69	13 961	14 239	28 200	5.46
70–74	13 713	14 856	28 569	5.54
75–79	8 511	9 955	18 466	3.58
80–84	5 065	6 991	12 056	2.34
85–89	2 495	4 425	6 920	1.34
90–94	806	1 727	2 533	0.49
95–99	142	416	558	0.11
100–104	28	67	95	0.02
105–109	6	11	17	<0.01
110+	2	2	4	<0.01
Age group	Male	Female	Total	Percent
0–14	35 935	33 377	69 312	13.43
15–64	186 275	163 095	349 370	67.69
65+	44 729	52 689	97 418	18.88

View source data.
View source data.

Note: Crude migration change (per 1000) is a trend analysis, an extrapolation based average population change (current year minus previous) minus natural change of the current year (see table vital statistics). As average population is an estimate of the population in the middle of the year and not end of the year.

View source data.
View source data.

== Census per locality (1901–2021) ==
Year	1901	1911	1921	1931	1948	1957	1967	1985	1995	2005	2011	2021
Total	184,742	211,564	212,258	241,621	305,991	319,620	314,216	345,418	378,132	404,962	417,432	519,562
Malta	164,952	188,869	189,697	217,784	278,311	292,019	288,238	319,736	349,106	373,955	386,057	480,275
Gozo and Comino	19,790	22,695	22,561	23,837	27,680	27,601	25,978	25,682	29,026	31,007	31,375	39,287
Southern Harbour	70,244	74,955	79,001	87,811	84,206	90,705	87,879	86,843	83,234	81,047	79,438	86,009
Cospicua	12,148	12,164	11,536	12,163	4,822	9,095	9,123	7,731	6,085	5,657	5,249	4,654
Fgura	‐	‐	‐	‐	‐	‐	2,737	8,254	11,042	11,258	11,449	13,066
Floriana	5,687	5,811	5,907	6,241	5,074	5,811	4,944	3,327	2,701	2,240	2,014	1,985
Ħal Luqa	3,670	3,945	3,607	4,059	4,318	5,382	5,413	5,585	6,150	6,072	5,911	7,249
Ħal Tarxien	2,065	2,820	2,876	3,247	4,607	7,706	7,989	7,016	7,412	7,597	8,380	9,464
Ħaż‐Żabbar	5,750	7,012	7,044	8,003	11,726	11,005	10,167	12,869	14,138	14,671	14,916	17,148
Kalkara	1,158	1,491	1,698	1,899	2,068	2,101	1,945	2,086	2,833	2,882	2,946	3,105
Marsa	‐	‐	4,838	7,867	11,560	10,672	9,722	7,953	5,324	5,344	4,788	5,468
Paola	2,812	4,319	5,475	7,297	14,793	11,424	11,794	11,744	9,400	8,822	8,267	9,339
Santa Luċija	‐	‐	‐	‐	‐	‐	‐	3,208	3,605	3,186	2,970	2,617
Senglea	8,093	8,205	7,741	7,683	2,756	5,065	4,749	4,158	3,528	3,074	2,740	2,304
Valletta	22,768	23,006	22,392	22,779	18,666	18,202	15,279	9,340	7,262	6,300	5,748	5,157
Vittoriosa	6,093	6,182	5,887	6,573	3,816	4,242	4,017	3,572	3,069	2,701	2,489	2,261
Xgħajra	‐	‐	‐	‐	‐	‐	‐	‐	685	1,243	1,571	2,192
Northern Harbour	42,774	53,746	52,347	63,941	101,526	104,889	105,060	113,730	118,409	119,332	120,449	157,297
Birkirkara	8,417	9,573	8,565	10,345	16,070	16,987	17,213	20,385	21,281	21,858	21,749	25,807
Gżira	‐	‐	‐	‐	6,295	8,545	9,575	8,471	7,872	7,090	7,055	10,331
Ħal Qormi	8,187	9,404	9,286	10,165	14,396	14,869	15,398	18,256	17,694	16,559	16,394	18,099
Ħamrun	10,393	14,601	10,434	11,580	17,124	16,895	14,787	13,682	11,195	9,541	9,043	10,514
Msida	2,893	3,627	3,373	3,990	6,064	6,587	11,437	6,219	6,942	7,629	7,748	13,587
Pembroke	‐	‐	‐	‐	‐	‐	‐	‐	2,213	2,935	3,488	3,545
San Ġwann	‐	‐	‐	‐	‐	‐	2,122	8,179	12,011	12,737	12,152	14,244
Santa Venera	‐	‐	1,910	2,639	4,535	5,246	6,134	7,827	6,183	6,075	6,789	8,834
St Julian's	1,444	2,164	2,594	3,998	9,122	8,285	7,394	10,239	7,352	7,752	8,067	11,653
Swieqi	‐	‐	‐	‐	‐	‐	‐	‐	6,721	8,208	8,755	13,044
Ta' Xbiex	‐	‐	‐	‐	‐	‐	‐	1,955	1,732	1,860	1,556	2,092
Tal‐Pietà	933	1,205	1,823	2,344	3,626	4,076	‐	4,380	4,307	3,846	4,032	5,892
Tas‐Sliema	10,507	13,172	14,362	18,880	24,294	23,399	21,000	14,137	12,906	13,242	13,621	19,655
South Eastern	17,546	20,412	20,090	23,052	34,208	36,854	35,224	42,475	50,650	59,371	64,276	77,948
Birżebbuġa	‐	‐	1,219	1,724	5,339	5,297	4,876	5,668	7,307	8,564	10,412	11,844
Gudja	1,133	1,270	1,167	1,283	1,486	1,712	1,729	2,156	2,882	2,923	2,994	3,229
Ħal Għaxaq	1,518	1,765	1,629	1,896	2,448	2,830	2,866	3,655	4,126	4,405	4,577	5,538
Ħal Kirkop	633	786	707	805	1,016	1,204	1,225	1,559	1,957	2,185	2,283	2,527
Ħal Safi	367	412	459	448	1,040	709	784	1,323	1,731	1,979	2,074	2,641
Marsaskala	‐	‐	‐	‐	‐	888	876	1,936	4,770	9,346	11,059	16,804
Marsaxlokk	446	715	791	829	1,431	1,469	1,462	2,405	2,857	3,222	3,366	3,988
Mqabba	1,228	1,358	1,282	1,468	1,965	2,088	2,120	2,269	2,613	3,021	3,223	3,525
Qrendi	1,333	1,522	1,526	1,611	2,144	2,155	2,094	2,199	2,344	2,535	2,667	3,148
Żejtun	7,234	8,060	7,701	8,731	11,980	11,665	10,440	11,321	11,379	11,410	11,334	12,409
Żurrieq	3,654	4,524	3,609	4,257	5,359	6,837	6,752	7,984	8,684	9,781	10,287	12,295
Western	21,666	24,478	23,587	26,393	34,899	36,196	36,142	44,580	51,961	57,038	58,129	65,266
Ħ'Attard	1,837	2,052	2,058	2,354	2,480	2,663	2,570	5,681	9,214	10,405	10,553	12,268
Ħad‐Dingli	807	963	1,087	1,258	1,869	2,041	1,795	2,047	2,725	3,347	3,511	3,865
Ħal Balzan	1,096	1,263	1,313	1,661	2,637	2,734	3,301	4,781	3,560	3,869	4,101	4,774
Ħal Lija	1,692	1,825	1,612	1,795	1,950	2,119	2,143	3,078	2,497	2,797	2,977	3,162
Ħaż‐Żebbuġ	5,454	5,950	5,361	5,756	7,493	7,969	8,131	9,788	10,398	11,292	11,580	13,785
Iklin	‐	‐	‐	‐	‐	‐	‐	‐	3,098	3,220	3,169	3,399
Mdina	304	482	816	982	1,384	823	988	421	377	278	239	193
Mtarfa	‐	‐	‐	‐	‐	‐	‐	‐	‐	2,426	2,585	2,566
Rabat	7,211	8,414	7,985	9,050	12,503	12,792	12,243	12,920	12,995	11,473	11,212	11,936
Siġġiewi	3,265	3,529	3,355	3,537	4,583	5,055	4,971	5,864	7,097	7,931	8,202	9,318
Northern	12,722	15,278	14,672	16,587	23,472	23,375	23,933	32,108	44,852	57,167	63,765	93,755
Ħal Għargħur	1,377	1,512	1,327	1,483	1,690	1,813	1,774	2,321	1,991	2,352	2,605	3,741
Mellieħa	2,357	2,675	2,637	3,198	4,549	4,290	4,279	4,525	6,221	7,676	8,661	12,738
Mġarr	745	1,067	1,271	1,627	2,218	2,167	2,115	2,188	2,672	3,014	3,479	4,840
Mosta	4,629	5,783	4,866	5,251	7,186	7,377	8,334	12,148	16,754	18,735	19,750	23,482
Naxxar	3,429	3,209	2,886	3,249	4,389	4,688	4,643	6,461	9,822	11,978	12,875	16,912
St Paul's Bay	185	1,032	1,685	1,779	3,440	3,040	2,788	4,465	7,392	13,412	16,395	32,042
Gozo and Comino	19,790	22,695	22,561	23,837	27,680	27,601	25,978	25,682	29,026	31,007	31,375	39,287
Fontana	‐	‐	‐	‐	‐	‐	893	836	817	850	882	1,042
Għajnsielem	1,121	1,295	1,250	1,449	1,878	1,860	1,755	1,809	2,176	2,570	2,645	3,523
Għarb	1,091	1,417	1,402	1,398	1,555	1,269	1,117	983	1,030	1,146	1,196	1,549
Għasri	467	428	409	467	594	471	374	335	369	418	431	518
Munxar	‐	‐	‐	‐	‐	‐	420	507	780	1,052	1,068	1,707
Nadur	2,948	3,393	3,460	3,354	3,465	4,136	3,694	3,482	3,882	4,192	3,973	1,707
Qala	1,219	1,368	1,340	1,601	1,569	1,616	1,522	1,369	1,492	1,616	1,811	2,300
San Lawrenz	643	558	528	499	413	428	511	517	552	598	610	772
Ta' Kerċem	1,037	1,135	1,143	1,212	1,307	1,272	1,251	1,411	1,557	1,665	1,718	1,881
Ta' Sannat	1,116	1,243	1,228	1,324	1,625	1,656	1,297	1,309	1,604	1,725	1,837	2,186
Victoria	5,057	5,655	5,219	5,531	6,175	6,357	5,462	5,968	6,524	6,395	6,252	7,242
Xagħra	2,562	3,156	3,262	3,522	4,759	4,056	3,517	3,202	3,669	3,934	3,968	5,161
Xewkija	1,762	2,135	2,314	2,470	3,079	3,281	2,999	2,772	3,128	3,111	3,143	3,555
Żebbuġ	767	912	1,006	1,010	1,261	1,199	1,166	1,182	1,446	1,735	1,841	3,303

Notes:

1. Gżira shown as a separate locality since 1948.
2. New locality of Msieraħ (San Ġwann) constituted from parts of Birkirkara and St Julian's and is shown as separate locality in 1967.
3. New locality of Fgura constituted from parts of Paola, Ħal Tarxien and Ħaż‐Żabbar in 1967.
4. Marsaskala shown as a separate locality since 1957.
5. New locality of Munxar constituted from parts of Ta' Sannat and Fontana till 1957.
6. New locality of Fontana shown as separate locality till 1967.
7. Gwardamangia formed part of Ħamrun in 1967.
8. Tal‐Pietà formed part of Msida in 1967.
9. Santa Luċija formed part of Ħal Tarxien and Paola till 1967.
10. Ta' Xbiex formed part of Msida and Gżira till 1967.
11. Pembroke formed part of St Julian's till 1985.
12. Swieqi formed part of St Julian's till 1985.
13. Xgħajra formed part of Ħaż‐Żabbar till 1985.
14. Iklin formed part of Ħal Lija, Birkirkara, Naxxar and San Ġwann till 1985.
15. Mtarfa formed part of Rabat till 1995.
16. The boundaries of some localities were changed between 1995 and 2005.

Source: Census of population and housing 2011, Final Report, p. 3; Census of population and housing 2021, Final Report

== See also ==
- Malta
- Culture of Malta
- Maltese people
- Ageing of Europe
