= ISO 3166-2:MT =

Entry for Malta in ISO 3166-2

ISO 3166-2:MT is the entry for Malta in ISO 3166-2, part of the ISO 3166 standard published by the International Organization for Standardization (ISO), which defines codes for the names of the principal subdivisions (e.g., provinces or states) of all countries coded in ISO 3166-1.

Currently for Malta, ISO 3166-2 codes are defined for 68 local councils.

Each code consists of two parts, separated by a hyphen. The first part is MT, the ISO 3166-1 alpha-2 code of Malta. The second part is two digits (01–68).

== Current codes ==
Subdivision names are listed as in the ISO 3166-2 standard published by the ISO 3166 Maintenance Agency (ISO 3166/MA).

ISO 639-1 codes are used to represent subdivision names in the following administrative languages:

- (en): English
- (mt): Maltese

Subdivision names are sorted in Maltese alphabetical order: a-b, ċ, d-ġ, g, għ, h, ħ, i, ie, j-ż, z.

Click on the button in the header to sort each column.

| Code | Subdivision name (mt) | Official name (mt) (Note: For reference only, official name not included in the ISO 3166-2 standard.) | Subdivision name (en) |
|---|---|---|---|
| MT-01 | Attard | Ħ'Attard | Attard |
| MT-02 | Balzan | Ħal Balzan | Balzan |
| MT-03 | Birgu | Il-Birgu (Citta' Vittoriosa) | Birgu |
| MT-04 | Birkirkara | Birkirkara | Birkirkara |
| MT-05 | Birżebbuġa | Birżebbuġa | Birżebbuġa |
| MT-06 | Bormla | Bormla (Citta' Cospicua) | Bormla |
| MT-07 | Dingli | Ħad-Dingli | Dingli |
| MT-08 | Fgura | Il-Fgura | Fgura |
| MT-09 | Floriana | Il-Furjana | Floriana |
| MT-10 | Fontana | Il-Fontana | Fontana |
| MT-11 | Gudja | Il-Gudja | Gudja |
| MT-12 | Gżira | Il-Gżira | Gżira |
| MT-13 | Għajnsielem | Għajnsielem | Għajnsielem |
| MT-14 | Għarb | L-Għarb | Għarb |
| MT-15 | Għargħur | Ħal Għargħur | Għargħur |
| MT-16 | Għasri | L-Għasri | Għasri |
| MT-17 | Għaxaq | Ħal Għaxaq | Għaxaq |
| MT-18 | Ħamrun | Il-Ħamrun | Ħamrun |
| MT-19 | Iklin | L-Iklin | Iklin |
| MT-20 | Isla | L-Isla (Citta' Invicta) | Isla |
| MT-21 | Kalkara | Il-Kalkara | Kalkara |
| MT-22 | Kerċem | Ta' Kerċem | Kerċem |
| MT-23 | Kirkop | Ħal Kirkop | Kirkop |
| MT-24 | Lija | Ħal Lija | Lija |
| MT-25 | Luqa | Ħal Luqa | Luqa |
| MT-26 | Marsa | Il-Marsa | Marsa |
| MT-27 | Marsaskala | Marsaskala or Wied il-Għajn | Marsaskala |
| MT-28 | Marsaxlokk | Marsaxlokk | Marsaxlokk |
| MT-29 | Mdina | L-Imdina (Citta' Notabile) | Mdina |
| MT-30 | Mellieħa | Il-Mellieħa | Mellieħa |
| MT-31 | Mġarr | L-Imġarr | Mġarr |
| MT-32 | Mosta | Il-Mosta | Mosta |
| MT-33 | Mqabba | L-Imqabba | Mqabba |
| MT-34 | Msida | L-Imsida | Msida |
| MT-35 | Mtarfa | L-Imtarfa | Mtarfa |
| MT-36 | Munxar | Il-Munxar | Munxar |
| MT-37 | Nadur | In-Nadur | Nadur |
| MT-38 | Naxxar | In-Naxxar | Naxxar |
| MT-39 | Paola | Paola or Raħal Ġdid | Paola |
| MT-40 | Pembroke | Pembroke | Pembroke |
| MT-41 | Pietà | Tal-Pietà | Pietà |
| MT-42 | Qala | Il-Qala | Qala |
| MT-43 | Qormi | Ħal Qormi (Citta' Pinto) | Qormi |
| MT-44 | Qrendi | Il-Qrendi | Qrendi |
| MT-45 | Rabat Għawdex | Ir-Rabat, Għawdex (Citta' Vittoria) | Rabat Gozo |
| MT-46 | Rabat Malta | Ir-Rabat, Malta | Rabat Malta |
| MT-47 | Safi | Ħal Safi | Safi |
| MT-48 | San Ġiljan | San Ġiljan | Saint Julian's |
| MT-49 | San Ġwann | San Ġwann | Saint John |
| MT-50 | San Lawrenz | San Lawrenz | Saint Lawrence |
| MT-51 | San Pawl il-Baħar | San Pawl il-Baħar | Saint Paul's Bay |
| MT-52 | Sannat | Ta' Sannat | Sannat |
| MT-53 | Santa Luċija | Santa Luċija | Saint Lucia's |
| MT-54 | Santa Venera | Santa Venera | Santa Venera |
| MT-55 | Siġġiewi | Is-Siġġiewi (Citta' Ferdinand) | Siġġiewi |
| MT-56 | Sliema | Tas-Sliema | Sliema |
| MT-57 | Swieqi | Is-Swieqi | Swieqi |
| MT-58 | Ta' Xbiex | Ta' Xbiex | Ta' Xbiex |
| MT-59 | Tarxien | Ħal Tarxien | Tarxien |
| MT-60 | Valletta | Il-Belt Valletta (Citta' Umilissima) | Valletta |
| MT-61 | Xagħra | Ix-Xagħra | Xagħra |
| MT-62 | Xewkija | Ix-Xewkija | Xewkija |
| MT-63 | Xgħajra | Ix-Xgħajra | Xgħajra |
| MT-64 | Żabbar | Ħaż-Żabbar (Citta' Hompesch) | Żabbar |
| MT-65 | Żebbuġ Għawdex | Iż-Żebbuġ, Għawdex | Żebbuġ Gozo |
| MT-66 | Żebbuġ Malta | Ħaż-Żebbuġ (Citta' Rohan) | Żebbuġ Malta |
| MT-67 | Żejtun | Iż-Żejtun (Citta' Beland) | Żejtun |
| MT-68 | Żurrieq | Iż-Żurrieq | Żurrieq |

== Changes ==
The following changes to the entry have been announced in newsletters by the ISO 3166/MA since the first publication of ISO 3166-2 in 1998:

| Newsletter | Date issued | Description of change in newsletter | Code/Subdivision change |
|---|---|---|---|
| Newsletter I-9 | 2007-11-28 | Addition of administrative subdivisions and of their code elements | Subdivisions added: 68 local councils |

== See also ==
- Subdivisions of Malta
- NUTS codes of Malta
