= 2008 Maltese local elections =

Local election held in Malta in 2008

Local elections were held in Malta on 8 March 2008, the same day of the general election. This year, the election was held in 23 of the 68 Maltese localities. These 23 localities are: Valletta (the capital city), Senglea (Città Invicta), Żebbuġ (Città Rohan), Żejtun (Città Beland), Balzan, Dingli, Fontana, Għajnsielem, Għasri, Iklin, Kirkop, Marsa, Mellieħa, Mqabba, Nadur, Pembroke, Qrendi, San Ġiljan, San Pawl il-Baħar, Santa Venera, Ta' Xbiex, Xewkija and Żurrieq. A separate local election was held on 24 May in Mtarfa, after the previous council was dissolved a monthly earlier. Of the candidates that ran for the Mtarfa May election, in which 3 councillors were elected for the Nationalist Party while 2 councillors were elected for the Malta Labour Party (MLP).

== Candidates for both elections ==
In total for the March election, 241 candidates ran for office. Of these 241 candidates, 120 were candidates for the Malta Labour Party (MLP), 110 for the Nationalist Party (PN), six for Democratic Alternative, and one candidate for the Alpha Party. Four candidates ran as independents.12 candidates contested the May election,

== Voter turnout ==
Voter turnout was lowest in San Pawl il-Baħar (68 percent turnout) and highest in Dingli and Qrendi (both 94 percent turnout).

Locality	% of voters	votes
Valletta	88%	5170
Senglea	89%	2244
Żebbuġ	92%	8230
Żejtun	92%	8549
Balzan	89%	2831
Dingli	94%	2414
Fontana	90%	657
Għajnsielem	83%	1917
Għasri	78%	339
Iklin	91%	2207
Kirkop	93%	1562
Marsa	90%	3818
Mellieħa	81%	5373
Mqabba	92%	2147
Nadur	85%	3113
Pembroke	89%	1952
Qrendi	94%	1918
San Ġiljan	77%	5288
San Pawl il-Baħar	68%	8245
Santa Venera	92%	4910
Ta' Xbiex	86%	1278
Xewkija	89%	2273
Żurrieq	92%	7244
Total	86%	

== Results ==
Locality	MLP	PN	AD	AP	Ind
Valletta	3	4	-	-	-
Senglea	4	1	-	-	-
Żebbuġ	5	4	-	-	-
Żejtun	7	2	-	-	-
Balzan	1	4	-	-	-
Dingli	3	2	-	-	-
Fontana	2	3	-	-	-
Għajnsielem	2	3	-	-	-
Għasri	2	3	-	-	-
Iklin	2	3	-	-	-
Kirkop	3	2	-	-	-
Marsa	5	2	-	-	-
Mellieħa	3	4	-	-	-
Mqabba	2	3	-	-	-
Nadur	2	3	-	-	-
Pembroke	3	2	-	-	-
Qrendi	3	2	-	-	-
San Ġiljan	2	5	-	-	-
San Pawl il-Baħar	4	7	-	-	-
Santa Venera	3	4	-	-	-
Ta' Xbiex	3	2	-	-	-
Xewkija	3	2	-	-	-
Żurrieq	6	3	-	-	-
Total	73	70	-	-	-
