= 2005 Maltese local elections =

Local elections were held in Malta on 12 March 2005. The Malta Labour Party won an absolute majority. Approximately 68% of the eligible voters turned up on election day. In Malta the vast majority of the electorate normally votes on election days, with turnout sometimes averaging above 92% for general elections.

The number of councillors for each locality is determined according to the population in the locality, where 5 is the minimum and 13 the maximum number of councillors. This decision has been strongly criticized and many Nationalists too did not agree with such 'strategic measures', as quoted by the Maltese Prime Minister, Lawrence Gonzi. The Nationalist Party has been accused of threatening democracy in Malta by reducing the number of candidates just minutes before the closing stipulated time for accepting nominations. Two localities (Marsa and Żejtun, both famous for being Malta Labour Party strongholds) did not vote in these elections because of this reason.

== Results ==
Local election results by locality
Locality	MLP: %votes	PN: %votes	AD: %votes	ind: %votes	MLP	PN	AD	IND
Valletta (Città Umillisima)	45%	54%	0	1%	3	4	0	0
Żebbuġ (Città Rohan)	-	-	0	2%	5	4	0	0
Żejtun (Città Beland)	no	no	no	no	8	1	0	0
Balzan	27%	73%	0	0	1	4	0	0
Dingli	65%	35%	0	0	3	2	0	0
Fontana	38%	62%	0	0	2	3	0	0
Għajnsielem	30%	58%	0	12%	1	3	0	1
Għasri	43%	57%	0	0	2	3	0	0
Iklin	40%	52%	8%	0	2	3	0	0
Kirkop	69%	31%	0	0	4	1	0	0
Marsa	no	no	no	no	5	2	0	0
Mellieħa	55%	42%	3%	0	4	3	0	0
Mqabba	49%	51%	0	0	3	2	0	0
Nadur	35%	62%	3%	0	2	3	0	0
Pembroke	63%	29%	8%	0	3	2	0	0
Qrendi	54%	38%	0	8%	3	2	0	0
San Ġiljan	40%	54%	6%	0	3	4	0	0
San Pawl il-Baħar	44%	49%	7%	1%	4	5	0	0
Santa Venera	53%	47%	0	0	4	3	0	0
Ta' Xbiex	64%	36%	0	0	3	2	0	0
Xewkija	67%	33%	0	1%	4	1	0	0
Żurrieq	-	-	0	1%	5	2	0	0
Locality	MLP: %votes	PN: %votes	AD: %votes	ind: %votes	MLP	PN	AD	IND
Valletta (Città Umillisima)	45%	54%	0	1%	3	4	0	0
Żebbuġ (Città Rohan)	-	-	0	2%	5	4	0	0
Żejtun (Città Beland)	no	no	no	no	8	1	0	0
