= 2015 Maltese local elections =

Maltese Local Council Elections
- 11 April 2015

34 of 68 Maltese Local Councils .
- Turnout: 67.6
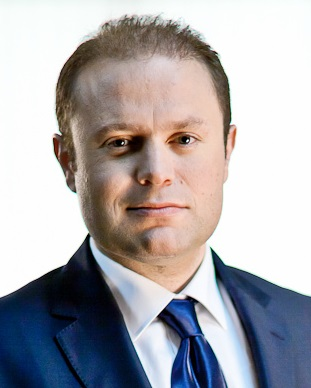

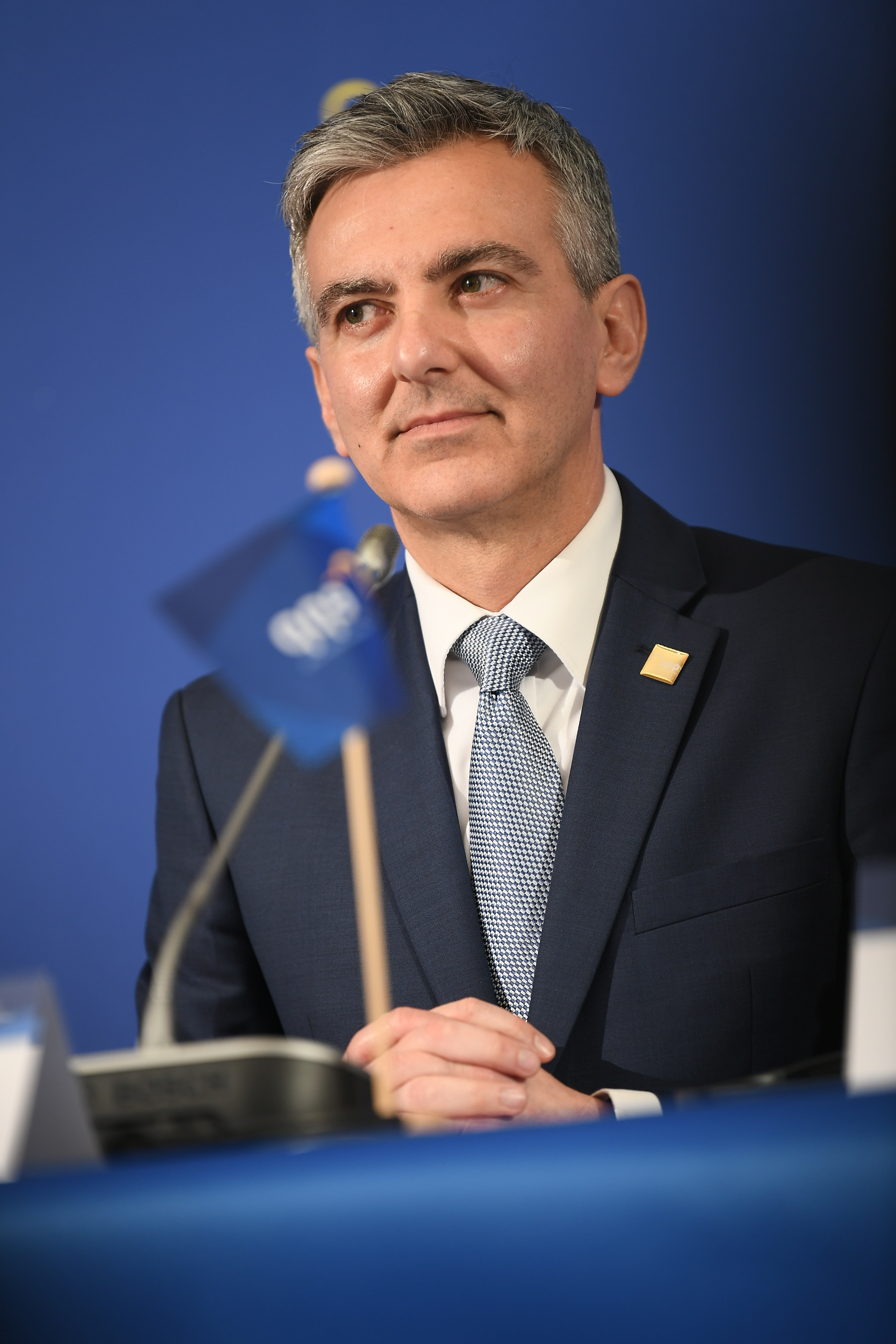
	First party	Second party	Third party
Leader	Joseph Muscat	Simon Busuttil	Arnold Cassola
Party	Labour	Nationalist	Democratic Alternative
Leader since	6 June 2008	4 May 2013
Last election	131 seats, 55.67%	41.84%
Seats won	119	104	1
Seat change	▼12
Popular vote	67,549	56,337	1,393
Percentage	53.45%	44.59%	1.1%
Swing	▼2.22%	▲2.75%

Local elections were held in half of Malta and Gozo on 11 April 2015.

In these local elections, 16-year-olds were allowed to vote for the first time. The voting age for parliamentary elections remained at 18.

== Results ==
=== Full results ===
Party	Votes	%	Seats
Labour Party	67,539	53.45	119
Nationalist Party	56,337	44.59	104
Democratic Alternative	1,393	1.10	1
Floriana l-Ewwel (Note: only in Floriana)	132	0.10	–
Agenda for Floriana (Note: only in Floriana)	127	0.10	–
Independents	822	0.65	–
Total	126,350	100.00	224
Valid votes	126,350	94.54	
Invalid/blank votes	7,294	5.46	
Total votes	133,644	100.00	
Registered voters/turnout	197,699	67.60	
Source: Electoral Commission of Malta

=== By Local Council ===
Locality	Labour Party		Nationalist Party		Others	
Locality	%	Seats	%	Seats	%	Seats
Birgu	78.95%	4	21.05%	1	0%	0
Isla	79.95%	4	20.05%	1	0%	0
Qormi	62.49%	7	36.54%	4	0.97%	0
Żebbuġ	55.48%	5	41.45%	4	3.07%	0
Siġġiewi	47.19%	3	52.81%	4	0%	0
Attard	26.42%	2	64.41%	6	9.16%	1
Balzan	23.64%	1	76.36%	4	0%	0
Birżebbuġa	69.82%	5	30.18%	2	0%	0
Dingli	68.16%	4	31.84%	1	0%	0
Floriana	48.5%	3	32.58%	2	18.92%	0
Gżira	54.26%	4	45.74%	3	0%	0
Għajnsielem	34.18%	2	52.76%	3	13.06%	0
Gharghur	42.59%	2	57.41%	3	0%	0
Ħamrun	59.32%	4	40.68%	3	0%	0
Iklin	43.67%	2	56.33%	3	0%	0
Kerċem	40.13%	2	59.87%	3	0%	0
Kirkop	55.63%	3	34.59%	2	9.78%	0
Luqa	71.65%	5	28.35%	2	0%	0
Marsa	75.24%	4	24.76%	1	0%	0
Marsaxlokk	73.97%	4	26.03%	1	0%	0
Mosta	47.87%	6	52.13%	7	0%	0
Munxar	52.66%	3	42.66%	2	5.08%	0
Nadur	48.27%	2	50.17%	3	1.56%	0
Paola	67.74%	5	32.26%	2	0%	0
Qala	62.12%	3	36.35%	2	1.53%	0
Safi	57.58%	3	42.42%	2	0%	0
San Ġiljan	34.05%	3	60.51%	6	5.45%	0
San Lawrenz	25.11%	1	74.89%	4	0%	0
San Pawl il-Baħar	46.88%	6	47.68%	7	5.43%	0
Santa Luċija	62.54%	3	31.47%	2	5.99%	0
Swieqi	19.08%	2	80.92%	7	0%	0
Xagħra	59.3%	3	40.7%	2	0%	0
Żebbuġ	47.1%	2	52.9%	3	0%	0
Żurrieq	72.89%	7	27.11%	2	0%	0
