= Sacred Heart of Jesus Church, Fontana =

Sacred Heart Church
- The Parish church of the Sacred Heart
- Knisja Parrokjali tal-Qalb ta' Ġesu
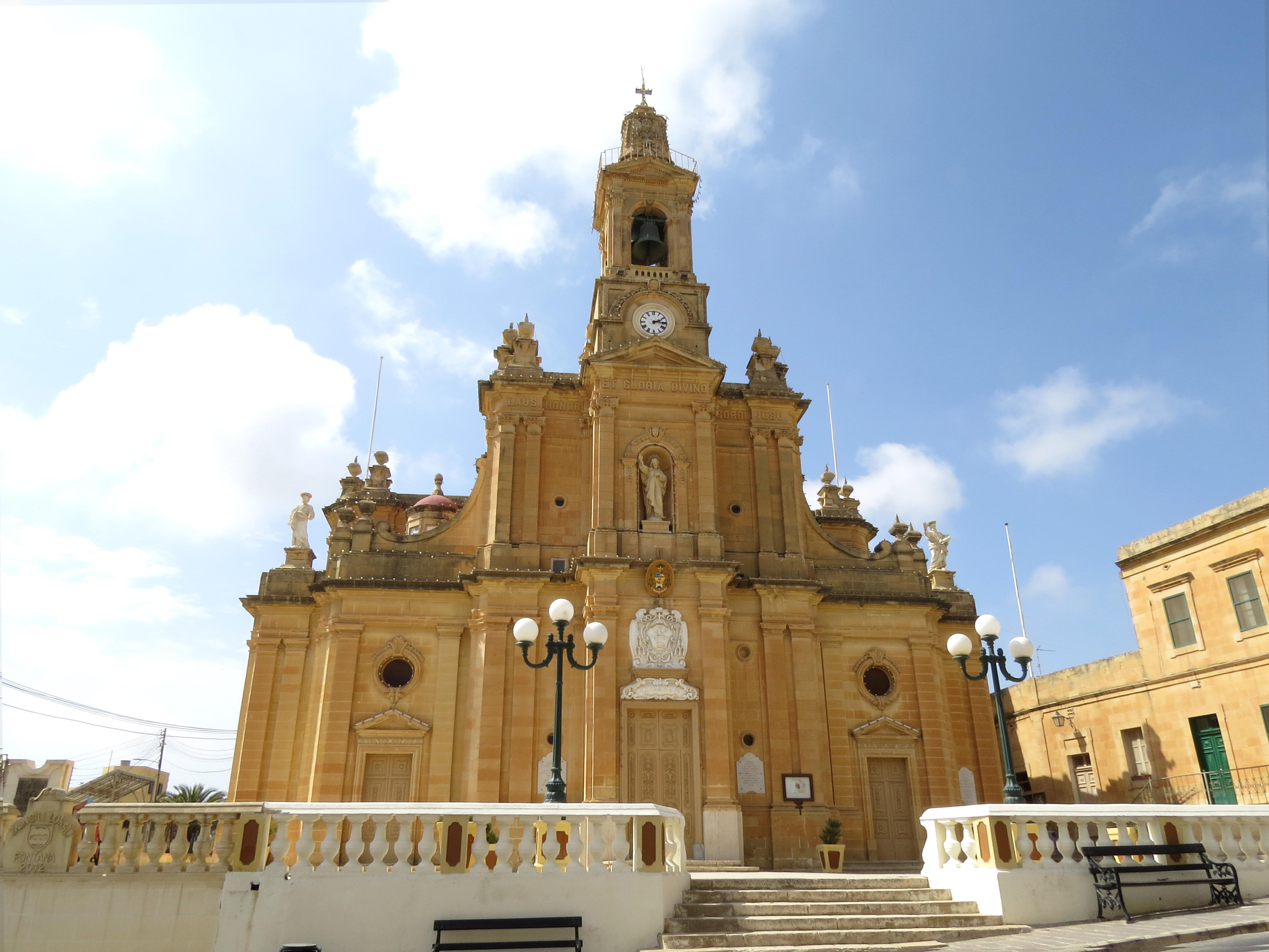
- Sacred Heart Church
- 36°02′21″N 14°14′12″E
- Location: Fontana
- Country: Malta
- Denomination: Roman Catholic
- Website: Website of the Church

History
- Status: Active
- Founded: 29 January 1892
- Dedication: Sacred Heart of Jesus
- Dedicated: 29 January 1905
- Consecrated: 29 January 1905

Architecture
- Functional status: Parish church
- Architectural type: Church
- Style: Baroque

Specifications
- Materials: Limestone

Administration
- Metropolis: Malta
- Diocese: Gozo
- Parish: Fontana, Gozo

Clergy
- Rector: John Muscat

The Sacred Heart of Jesus Church is in Fontana, Gozo Island, part of the Maltese Archipelago. It is the parish church of Fontana, one of the smallest villages on the island.

== History ==
The foundation stone was laid on 29 January 1893. The church was dedicated to the Sacred Heart of Jesus on 29 January 1905 by Bishop Giovanni Maria Camilleri. The main altarpiece, showing the Most Sacred Heart of Jesus, was crowned with a golden crown on 18 June 1993, by Bishop Nicholas J. Cauchi, on the occasion of the first centenary of the laying of the church's foundation stone. The main altarpiece is part of Giuseppe Calì's works.

The Fontana parish was established March 27, 1911 by Bishop Giovanni Maria Camilleri.

The church building is listed on the National Inventory of the Cultural Property of the Maltese Islands.

== See also ==
- Culture of Malta
- History of Malta
- List of Churches in Malta
- Religion in Malta
