= 2010 Maltese local elections =

March 2010 Maltese Administrative Committee elections
- 2010
- Turnout: 2,913 - 33.6%
	Majority party	Minority party	Third party
Party	Nationalist	Labour	Association for the Common Purpose
Popular vote	1764	960	0
Percentage	62.69%	34.12%	0%
	Fourth party
Party	Independent
Popular vote	90
Percentage	3.2%

Elections for Administrative Committees of hamlets were held in Malta in 2010. The elections were held in eight hamlets on 27 March, with elections in a further eight on 5 June. The March elections were won by the Nationalist Party, however the June elections resulted in a victory for the Labour Party.

== March elections ==
=== Overview ===
Elections were held in March in Bubaqra (Żurrieq), Fleur-de-Lys (Birkirkara), Kappara (San Ġwann), Madliena (Swieqi) and Paceville (St. Julian's), Marsalforn (Żebbuġ), Santa Luċija (Kerċem) and Xlendi (Munxar). In Santa Luċija there was no election because only five candidates ran for election, for a third party, the Association for the Common Purpose.

A total of ten candidates ran for the Labour Party, 36 candidates for the Nationalist Party and two independents. The Nationalist Party won the March elections with 63% of first count votes. The Labour Party obtained 34% while independent candidates obtained only 3%.

=== Turnout ===
The national turnout for the March elections was 35%. The highest turnout was in Fleur-de-Lys (48%) and the lowest in Xlendi (22%). Other turnouts were the following, 37% in Bubaqra, Kappara, and Madliena, 29% in Marsalforn, and 25% in Paceville.

=== Results ===
Party	Votes	%	Seats
Nationalist Party	1,764	62.69	26
Labour Party	960	34.12	8
Association for the Common Purpose (Note: Only in Santa Luċija, Ta' Kerċem; All five AC seats to the hamlet were won unopposed by this group.)	0	0.00	5
Independents	90	3.20	1
Total	2,814	100.00	40
Valid votes	2,814	96.60	
Invalid/blank votes	99	3.40	
Total votes	2,913	100.00	
Registered voters/turnout	8,662	33.63	
Source: Electoral Commission of Malta

June 2010 Maltese Administrative Committee elections
- 2010
- Turnout: 2,651 - 32.5%
	Majority party	Minority party	Third party
Party	Labour	Nationalist	A Better Environment for Burmarrad
Popular vote	1402	1122	24
	Fourth party
Party	Independents
Popular vote	18

== June elections ==
=== Overview ===
The June elections were held in Baħar iċ-Ċagħaq (Naxxar), Baħrija (Rabat, Malta), Burmarrad (San Pawl il-Baħar), Gwardamanġa (Pietà, Malta), Ħal Farruġ (Luqa), Swatar (Msida), St. Peters (Żabbar), and Tal-Virtù (Rabat, Malta).

=== Results ===
Party	Votes	%	Seats
Labour Party	1,402	54.64	20
Nationalist Party	1,122	43.73	19
A Better Environment for Burmarrad (Note: Only in Burmarrad.)	24	0.94	1
Independents	18	0.70	0
Total	2,566	100.00	40
Valid votes	2,566	96.79	
Invalid/blank votes	85	3.21	
Total votes	2,651	100.00	
Registered voters/turnout	8,160	32.49	
Source: Electoral Commission of Malta
