= Fontana, Gozo =

Fontana Il-Fontana It-Triq tal-Għajn
- Local council
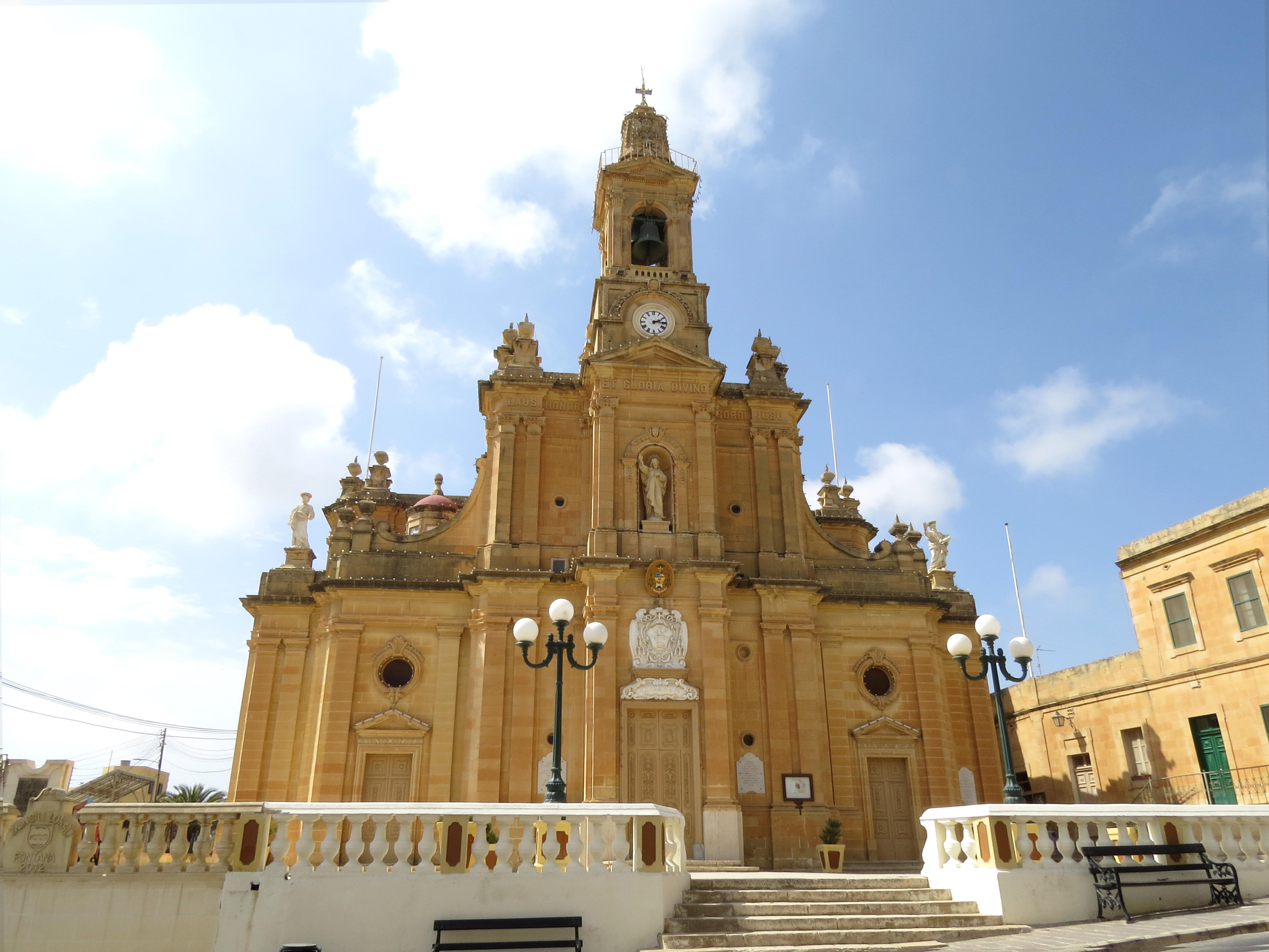
- View of Fontana parish church

- Flag Coat of arms
- Motto(s): Indundatione Ferax (Fertile through Inundation)
- Coordinates: 36°02′11″N 14°14′32″E
- Country: Malta
- Region: Gozo Region
- District: Gozo and Comino District
- Borders: Kerċem, Munxar, Victoria, Xewkija

Government
  - Mayor: Thomas Mizzi (PN)

Area
  - Total: 0.5 km^{2} (0.19 sq mi)

Population (Jul. 2024)
  - Total: 1,160
  - Density: 2,300/km^{2} (6,000/sq mi)
- Demonym(s): Fontani (m), Fontanija (f), Fontanin (pl)
- Time zone: UTC+1 (CET)
  - Summer (DST): UTC+2 (CEST)
- Postal code: FNT
- Dialing code: 356
- ISO 3166 code: MT-10
- Patron saint: Sacred Heart of Jesus
- Day of festa: 2nd or 3rd Sunday of June
- Website: Official website

Fontana (Maltese: Il-Fontana), as a local council, is an administrative unit of Malta, on the island of Gozo. The population of Fontana was 1,160 in July 2024. This included 630 males and 530 females; 899 Maltese nationals and 261 foreign nationals.

== History ==
Fontana originated from the suburb of Victoria on the Rabat-Xlendi road. It took its local name, "It-Triq tal-Għajn" (lit. the way to the spring), from a spring at the bottom of the road leading to Xlendi, known locally as "l-Għajn il-Kbira", (the big spring). Fontana is the Italian word for a spring.

On the lower part of Fontana, on the right-hand side of the road to Xlendi, there is the evergreen Lunzjata Valley going up to the village of Ta' Kerċem. Local farmers are busy around the year in this fertile part of Gozo.

== The People ==
Most of the fishermen that operated from the fishing village of Xlendi lived in Fontana. Also, some other people used to go hunting in the adjacent Lunzjata Valley. Later in the nineteenth century, they began setting aside part of the proceeds from their catches to construct a church.

== Zones in Fontana ==
- Is-Saqwi
- Tal-Għajn
- Wied tal-Lunzjata
- Wied Siekel
- Ix-Xari
- Manresa
- Santa Duminka

== The Sacred Heart Catholic Church in Fontana ==
The foundation stone of the church was laid on 29 January 1893. The church was consecrated twelve years to that day on 29 January 1905, and was dedicated to the Sacred Heart of Jesus. The church was established as the parish of Fontana on 27 March 1911 under Bishop Giovanni Maria Camilleri. The village feast is celebrated each year around the 2nd and 3rd week of June. The Sacred Heart of Jesus Church, Fontana is also a parish church, and considered to be a national sanctuary of the Sacred Heart.

== L-Għajn il-Kbira - The Big Spring ==
At times, people can still be found washing their clothes at the Fontana spring.

Arched shelters were built in the sixteenth century over the springs for the convenience of people when washing their clothes. A very old irrigation system made up from stone gutters constantly brings water from a spring situated in the Kerċem part of the valley.

== Fireworks ==
The village of Fontana always been known to have fireworks enthusiasts. It began with a short and quiet man, Ninu Farrugia, who had brought the skill of pyrotechnics from Malta. He was a prime master in fireworks and performed technical work in this skill with great skill and precision. His children later on continued this work. The Fontana Brothers, a number of youths from Fontana helped Ninu, and by time also turned into experts in this craft. Over time this group became well-known in Gozo for constructing fireworks for the Sacred Heart feast. Although Fontana was a small village, the amount of fireworks that was produced for the festival would be greater than that of other villages in Gozo. Thousands of people attended the feast to follow the infernal box. A new organisation, 'Għaqda tan-Nar Fontana' was set up in 2014, following the 2010 tragedy at Farrugia Brothers Fireworks Factory that cost the lives of 5 people from Fontana. To this day, it is said that the village of Fontana still leads the pyrotechnics side of Gozo by setting up grand fireworks shows including them with vast variety of fireworks.

== Shelters ==
Shelters were built beside the Springs. This was useful for the Fontanin to go for shelter when there were raids during World War II. This shelter started at the Springs and ended on a cliff overlooking Fontana.

== Sport ==
In the 1950s and 1960s, Fontana used to be represented by its own football club.

== Administration of the Local Council ==
- Simon Mizzi (Mayor, PN)
- Ivana Mizzi (PN)
- Joseph Mercieca (PN)
- Horace Micallef (PL)
- Carmel Micallef (PL)
