= Iklin =

Iklin L-Iklin
- Local council
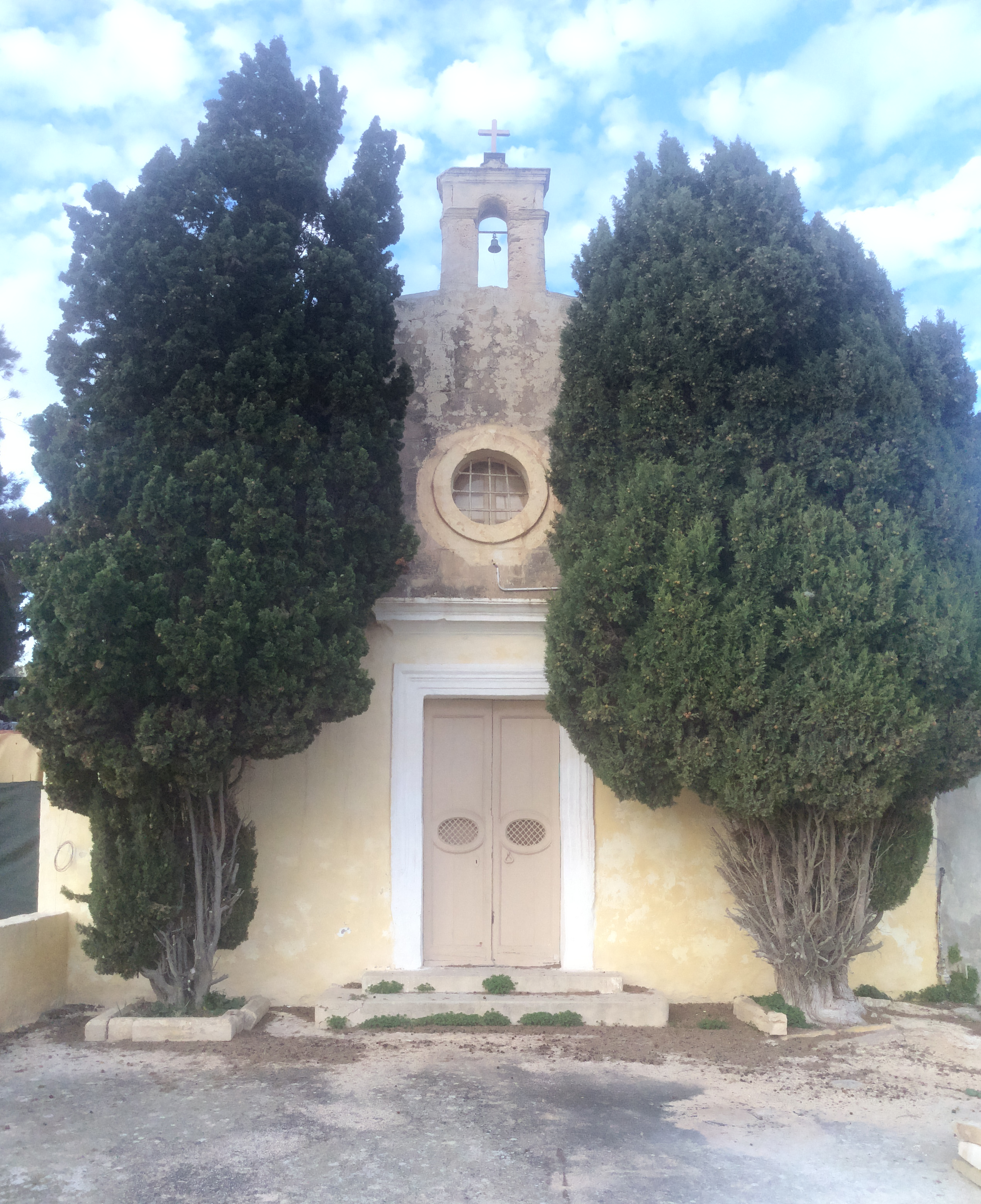
- Chapel of St. Michael Archangel built in 1615

- Flag Coat of arms

- Coordinates: 35°54′15″N 14°27′16″E
- Country: Malta
- Region: Eastern Region
- District: Western District
- Established: 1954

Area
  - Total: 1.7 km^{2} (0.66 sq mi)

Population (Jul. 2024)
  - Total: 3,692
  - Density: 2,200/km^{2} (5,600/sq mi)
- Demonym(s): Ikliniż (m), Ikliniża (f), Ikliniżi (pl)
- Time zone: UTC+1 (CET)
  - Summer (DST): UTC+2 (CEST)
- Postal code: IKL
- Dialing code: 356
- ISO 3166 code: MT-19
- Patron saint: Holy Family; St. Michael
- Day of festa: Sunday before 29 September (St. Michael)
- Website: Official website

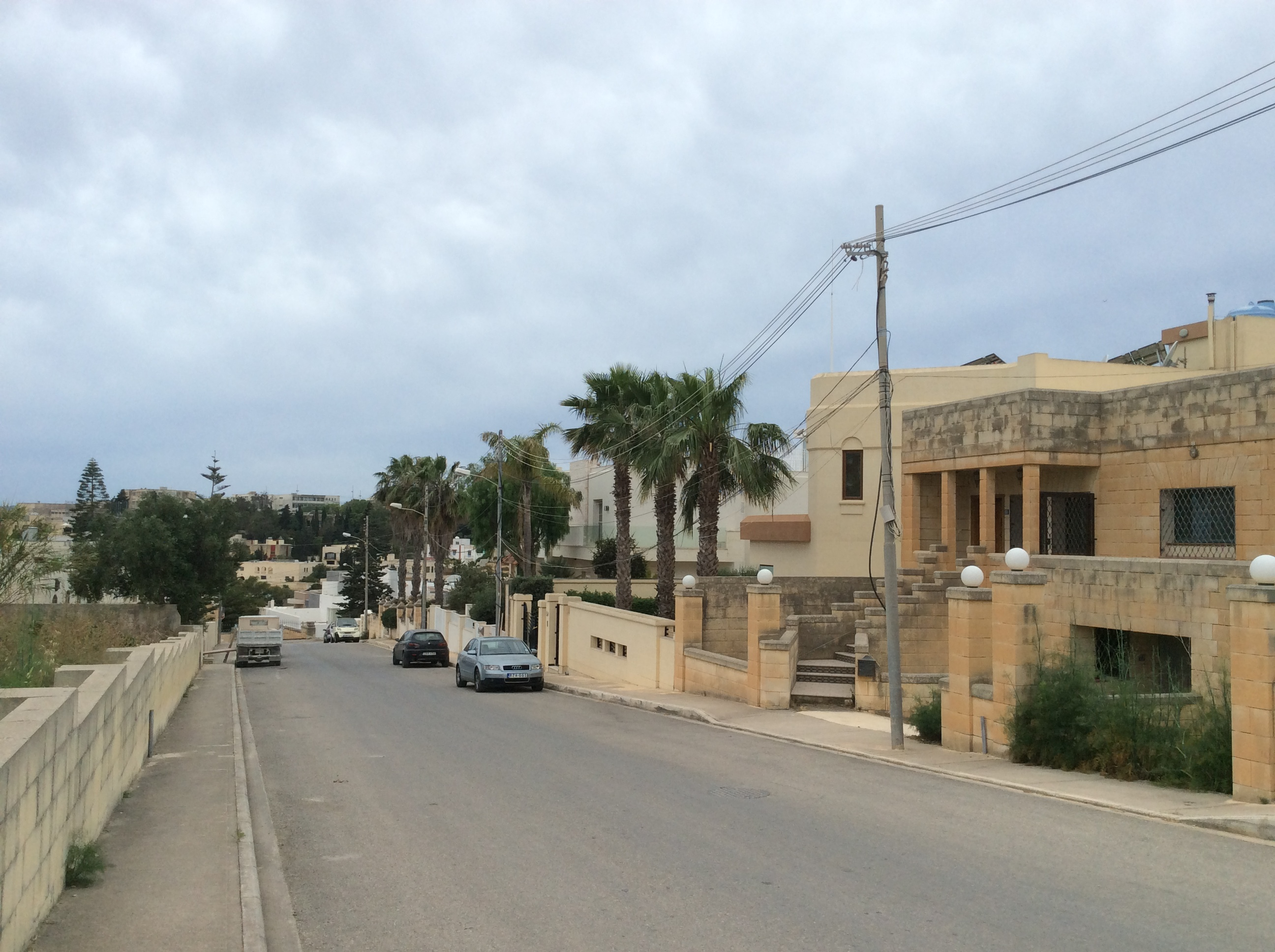
Residential Road, Iklin

Iklin (Maltese: L-Iklin) is a village in the Eastern Region of Malta. Iklin was established in the mid-20th century; however some archaeological sites and a medieval chapel, named as St. Michael Chapel, are proof to earlier settlements. Until recently, the town was considered to form part of the Three villages of Malta, as part of Lija. With the separation of Iklin from Lija, Iklin is no longer part of the three villages. It is bordered by Għargħur, San Ġwann, Birkirkara, Balzan and Naxxar. The population of Iklin was 3,692 in July 2024. This included 1,883 males and 1,809 females; 3,032 Maltese nationals and 660 foreign nationals.

Iklin is divided in Lower Iklin siding on the Birkirkara bypass and the Upper Iklin. In Lower Iklin houses are built side by side, in general villas and maisonettes but also recently some apartments. In Upper Iklin land is on a hill close to Naxxar and land is considered more expensive; in general the land consists of villas and farmhouses. The two sides share two common facts, the neighborhoods structural design and the general silence living areas.

== Etymology ==
The name of Iklin is derived from the herb Rosmarinus officinalis, which is known as l-iklin in Maltese. The valley in which the herb grew has now been built up. The coat of arms depicts a shield on a blue background with Saint Michael in the centre and, the six roses of L-Iklin on the borders.

== History ==
Modern day Iklin began to develop in the mid-20th century, but the area still has a few minor sites of archaeological importance.

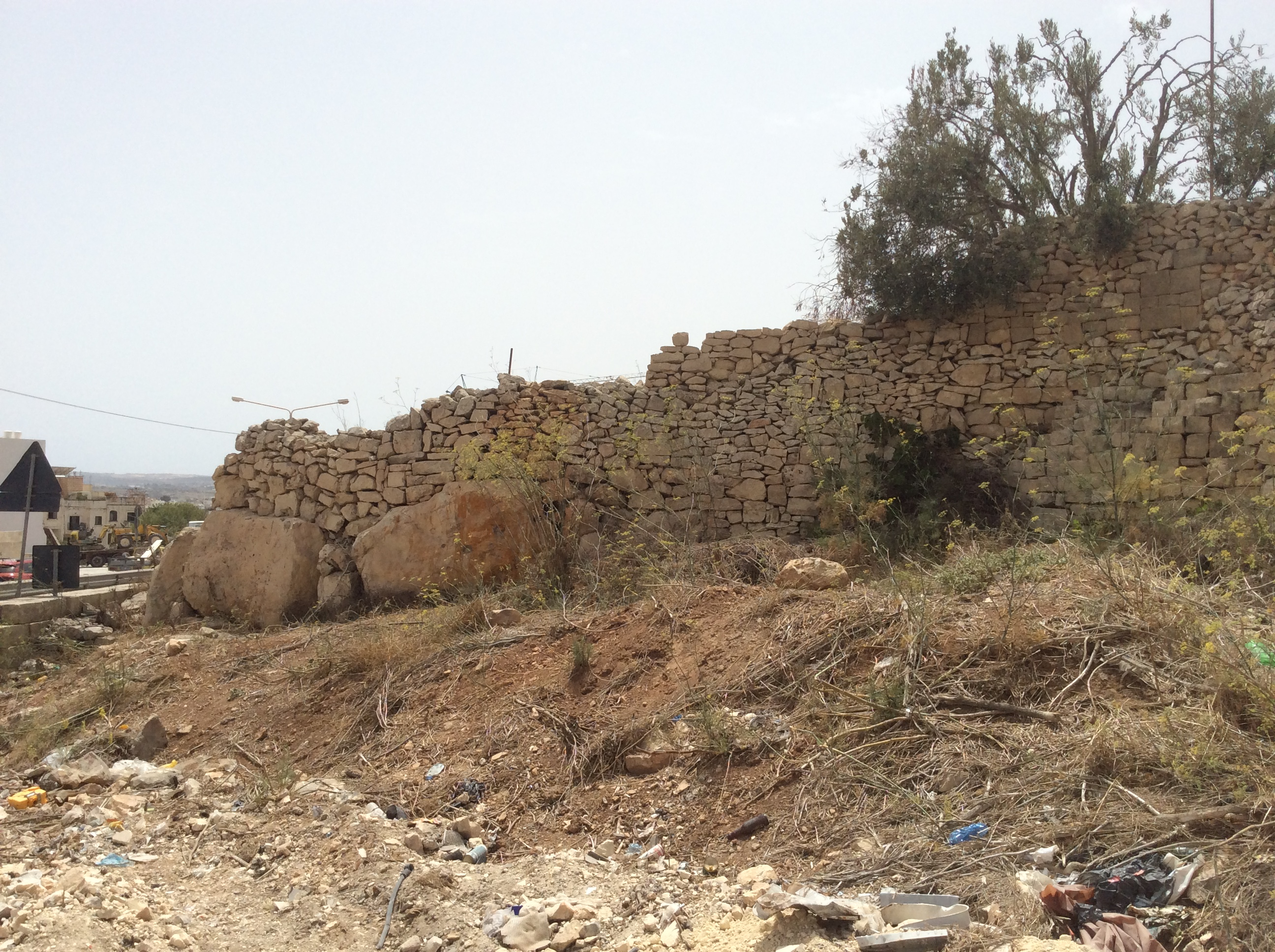
Pre-historic temple in Ta' Raddiena area

=== Prehistorical temples ===
A megalithic site, perhaps the remains of a temple, was discovered in 1967 by the Teenagers Din l-Art Ħelwa group from St. Aloysius' College. Unfortunately, this site has never been seriously surveyed or studied. A second megalithic site was studied in 1986 during works on the new Birkirkara By-Pass, in the area known as Tar-Raddiena. Two large megaliths, and a few smaller ones are still visible (though often ignored) on this busy road. The ruins were dated, through pottery sherds found during excavation, to the Bronze Age. The foundations of a Roman Villa were excavated in 1975 during construction works. The site has had its own historic importance, but it was destroyed soon after the excavations when the development for housing estates proceeded. Various references can be found related to these pre-historic sites with documents penned by Maltese archeologist, Anthony Bonanno. It is widely believed that further remains are still to be found and unearthed in the surrounding areas.

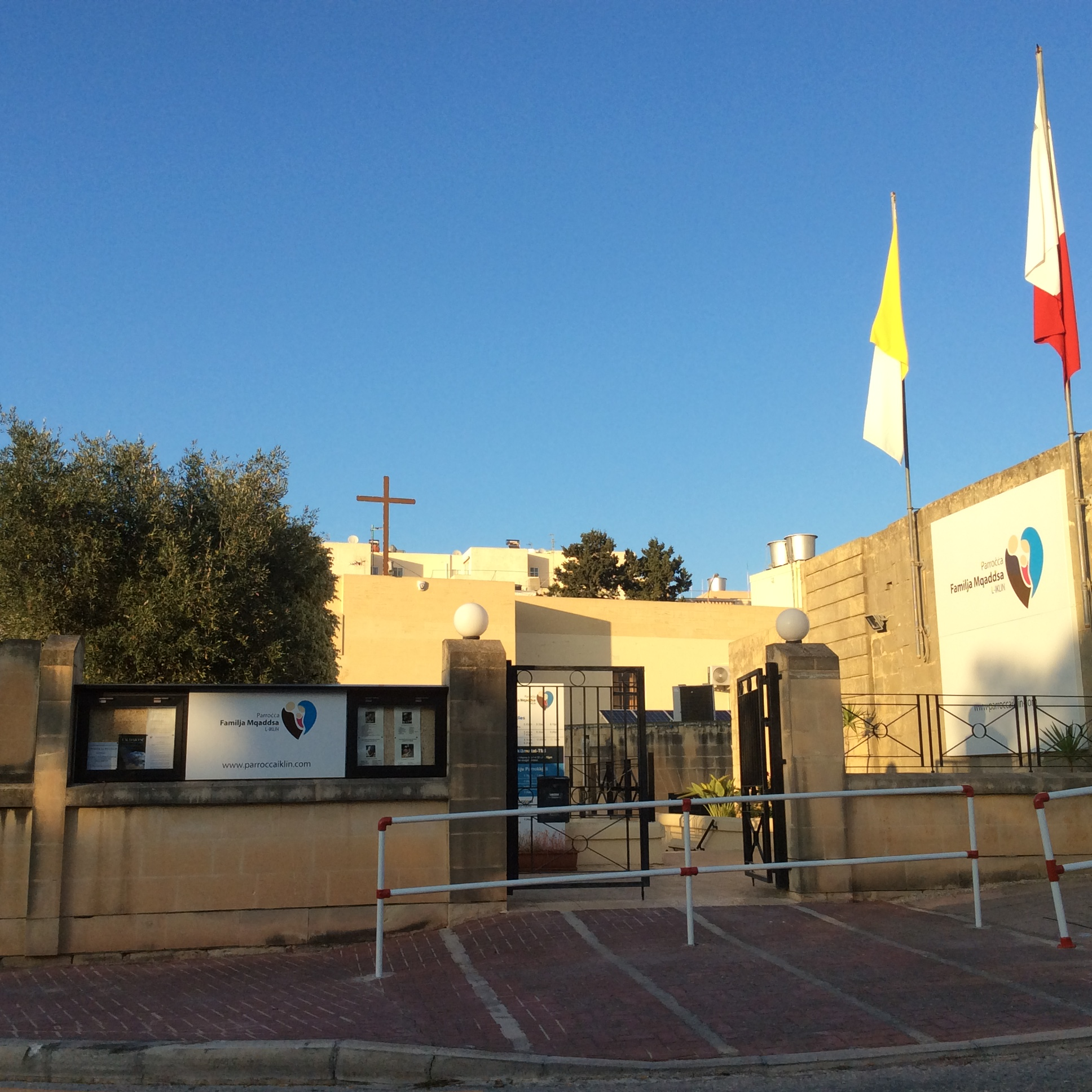
Centre of Iklin - Community Parish dedicated to the Holy Family

=== Old Chapel ===
In the 15th century, a chapel dedicated to St. Michael was built in what is now Iklin. Pietro Dusina visited the chapel during his Apostolic Visit of 1575, and he described it as being in a poor state. The chapel was rebuilt in 1615 by Gilormu Agius. Today it is open once a year for the feast of St. Michael, which is celebrated the Sunday before 29 September by the Lija fireworks team.

The first purposely-built residential house in modern Iklin was Dar il-Lewża, which was built in 1954, suffered severe structural impact as outlined in 2012, and demolished in 2018. A number of villas were constructed in the 1960s and early 1970s, and development increased rapidly between the late 1970s and the 1980s. Iklin has had a local council since 1994, and the town became a separate parish in 2005. A new parish church named for the Holy Family was built for this purpose.

== Local Council ==
The Iklin Local Council was established by the Local Councils Act of 1993, along with the other local councils of Malta. The first election was held on 19 March 1994.

The local council, elected in 2019, is made up of the following members:

- Dr. Dorian Sciberras(mayor)
- Mrs. Yvonne Bartolo (deputy mayor)
- Ms Bernice Farrugia
- Mr Emanuel Zammit
- Mr Godwin Catania
- Etienne Montfort (executive secretary)

== Church ==
The Holy Family Parish Church, situated in Pjazza Ninu Cremona, serves as the main church in this small locality. In the 80s, the need for a church was evident with the growing population. The first steps were taken by the then Lija parish priest to set up locations where catechism could be taught and mass celebrated. On 23 July 1993, through the donation of a benefactor, a property was converted into a church and the new Pastoral Centre was officially inaugurated. It was only in 2005 that this church became an officially recognised Parish church. 360 Virtual tour of the church can be seen here.

== Sport ==
The Lija/Iklin Football Nursery is fast gaining prominence on the local sports scene. Inaugurated in 2002, this association was co-founded by Lija and Iklin as a training nursery to eventually feed the best players to the Lija Athletic Football Club. The need for better training and playing facilities continues to be felt in this locality.

== Zones in Iklin ==
The locality of Iklin includes the following zones:

- Il-Qasbija
- Ta' Ġnien Fonsu (Alphons' Garden)
- Ta' Kieles
- Ta' Simblija
- Tal-Balal
- Tat-Tabib (Doctor's area)
- Tax-Xwieki
- Hal Mann

== Main roads ==
The main roads of Iklin are:

- Triq Dun Karm (Dun Karm By-Pass)
- Triq Geronimo Abos (Geronimo Abos Street)
- Triq il-Wied (Valley Road)
- Triq in-Naxxar (Naxxar Road)

=== Village Squares ===
Ninu Cremona Square

Anton Buttigieg Square

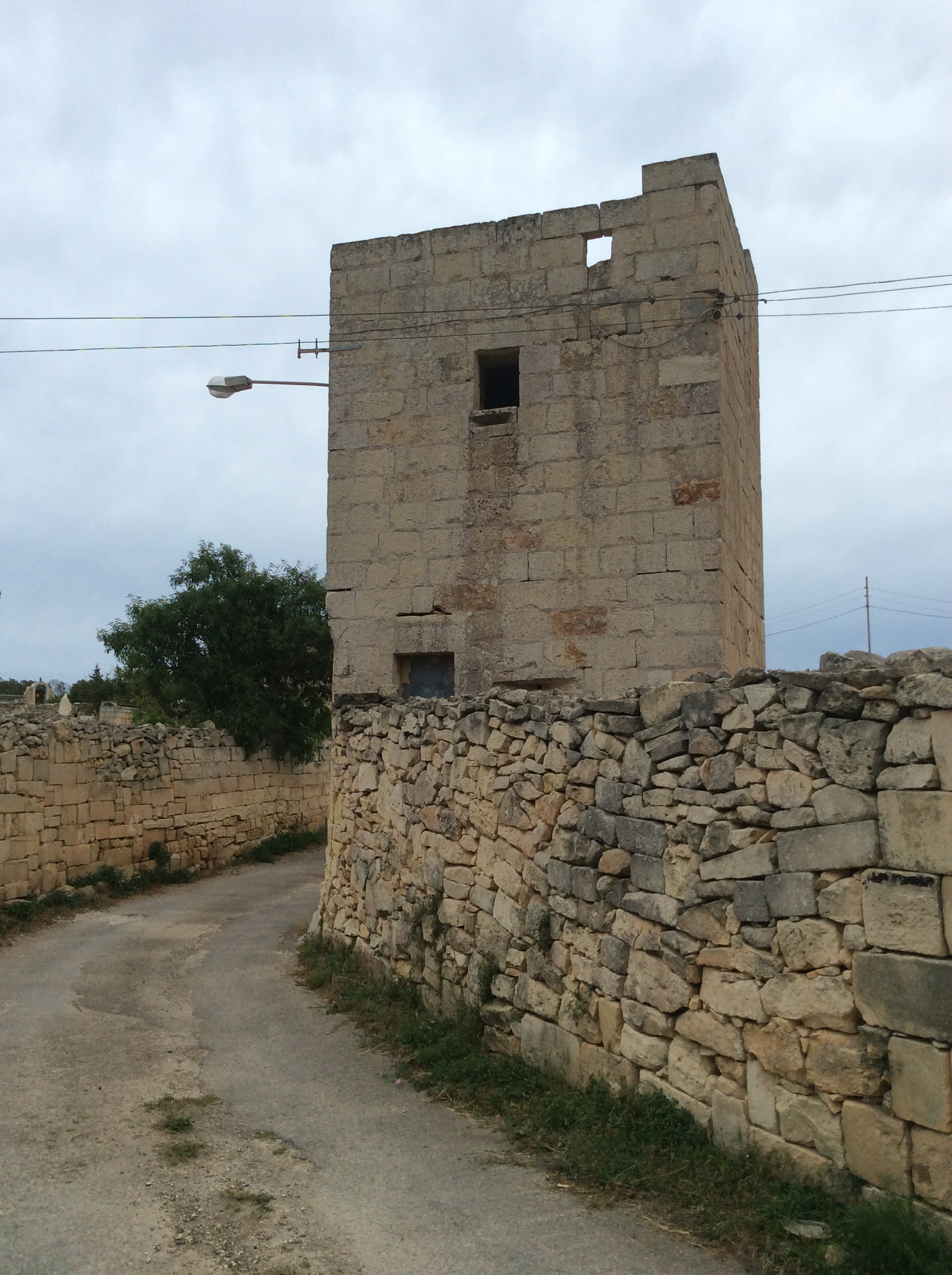
Old Buildings, Iklin

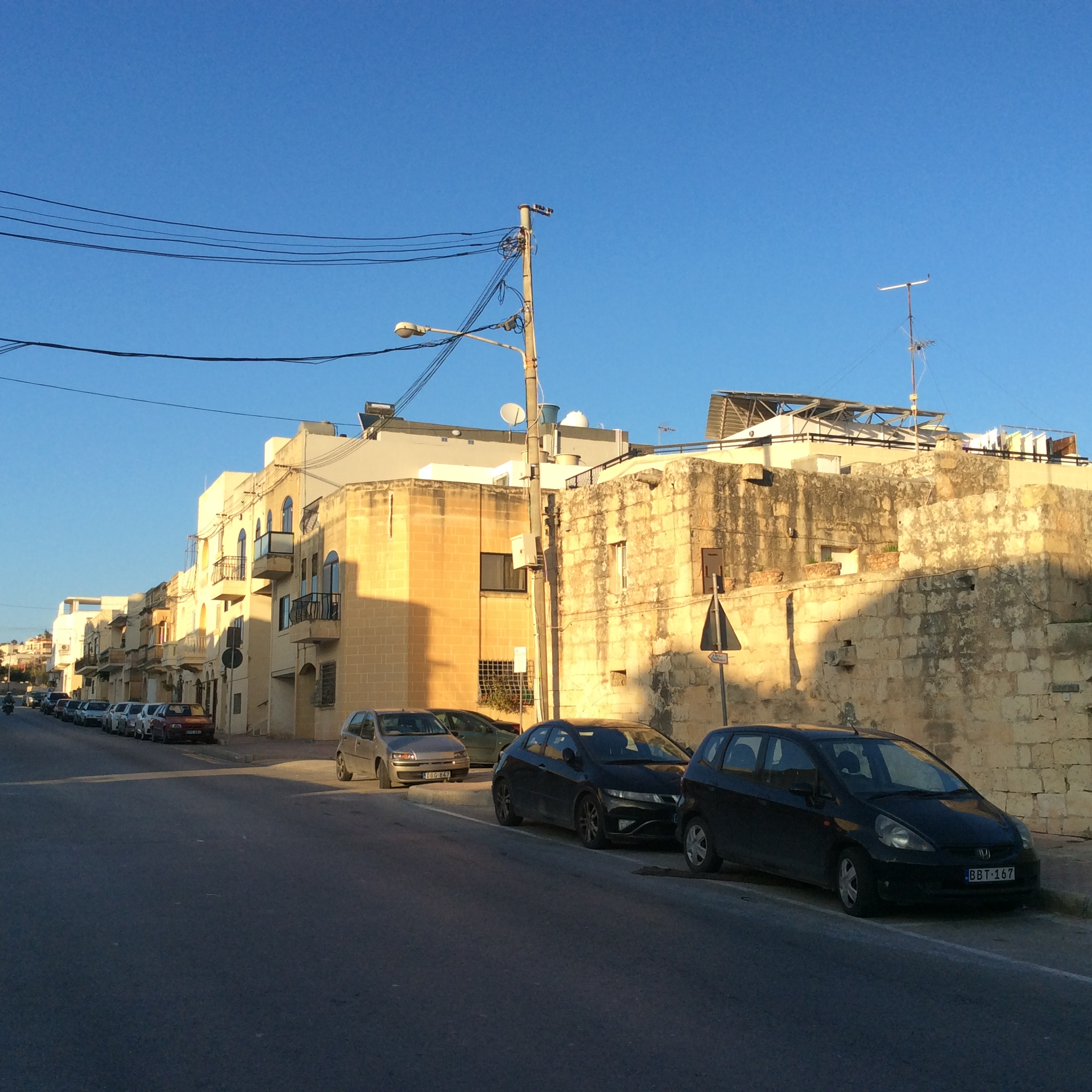
Old houses being replaced by new developments, Iklin

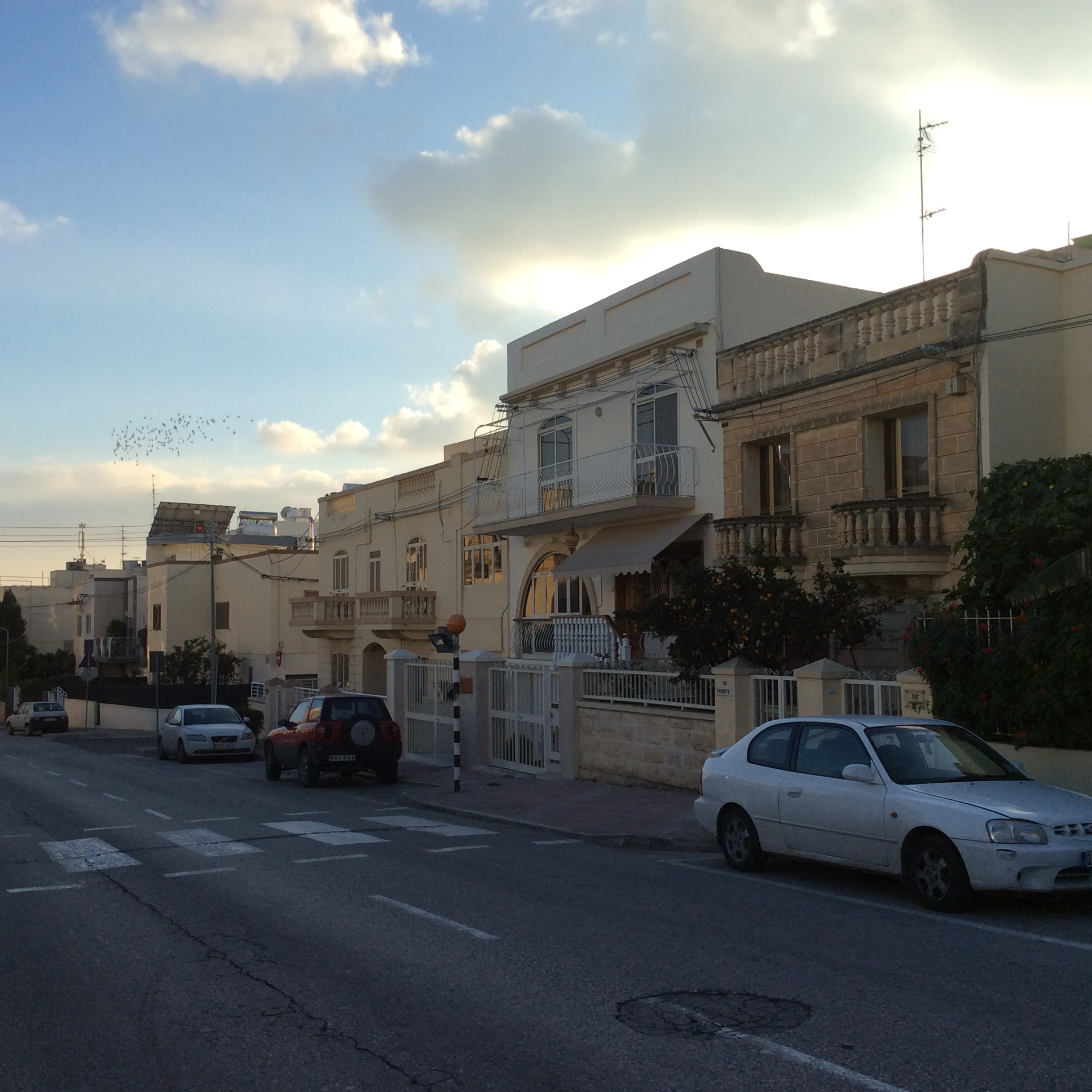
Residential Areas, Iklin

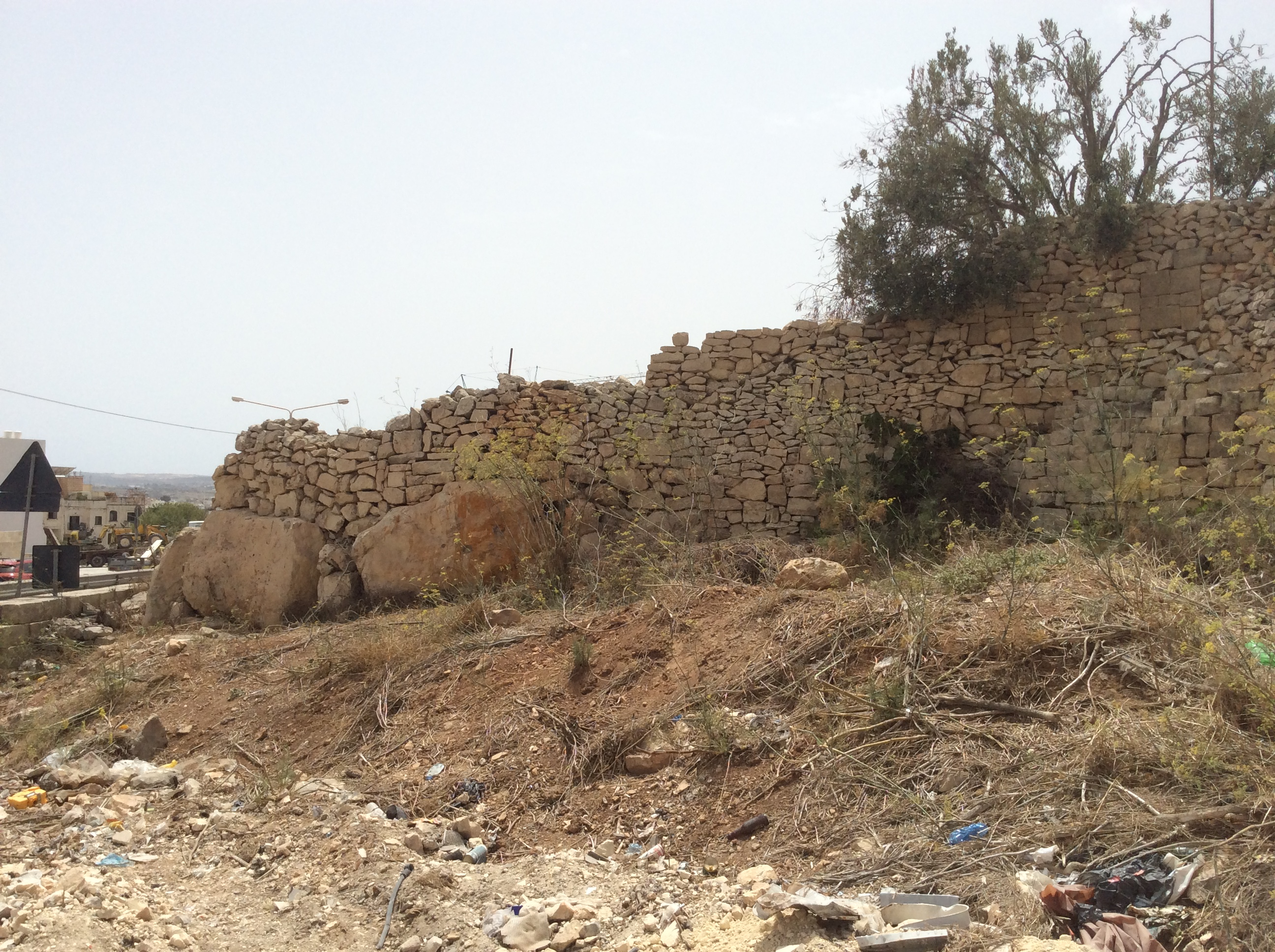
Remains of Pre-historic temples, Iklin

== Notable businesses ==
The Model Shop, Malta's largest toy retail chain, was founded in Iklin in 1983 and maintains its flagship store on the Birkirkara Bypass. From this single location the business grew to nine outlets across Malta and Gozo.

== Important links ==
Iklin Local Council
