= Kirkop =

Kirkop Ħal Kirkop
- Local council
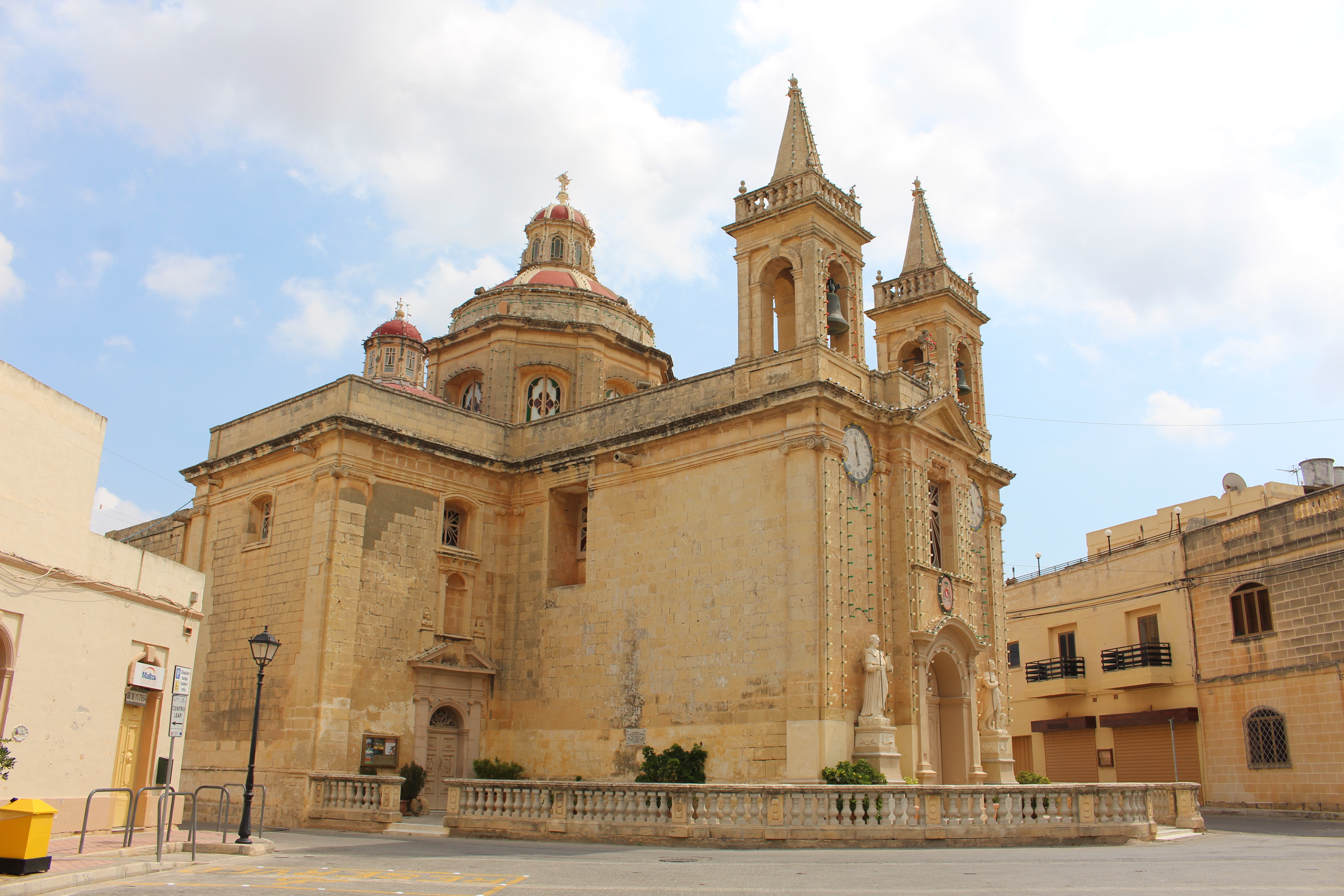
- Parish Church of St Leonard

- Flag Coat of arms
- Motto: Parva non iners
- Coordinates: 35°50′31″N 14°29′6″E
- Country: Malta
- Region: Western Region
- District: South Eastern District
- Borders: Luqa, Mqabba, Safi, Żurrieq

Government
  - Mayor: Matthew Agius Zammit (PL)

Area
  - Total: 1.1 km^{2} (0.42 sq mi)

Population (Jul. 2024)
  - Total: 2,659
  - Density: 2,400/km^{2} (6,300/sq mi)
- Demonym(s): Koppi (m), Koppija (f), Koppin (pl)
- Time zone: UTC+1 (CET)
  - Summer (DST): UTC+2 (CEST)
- Postal code: KKP
- Dialing code: 356
- ISO 3166 code: MT-23
- Patron saint: Saint Leonard
- Day of festa: 3rd Sunday of September

Kirkop (Maltese: Ħal Kirkop) is a village in the Southern Region of Malta. Located near the Malta International Airport, it has been inhabited since pre-history. The parish church is dedicated to Saint Leonard. The football team of the village is Kirkop United.

== Etymology and population ==
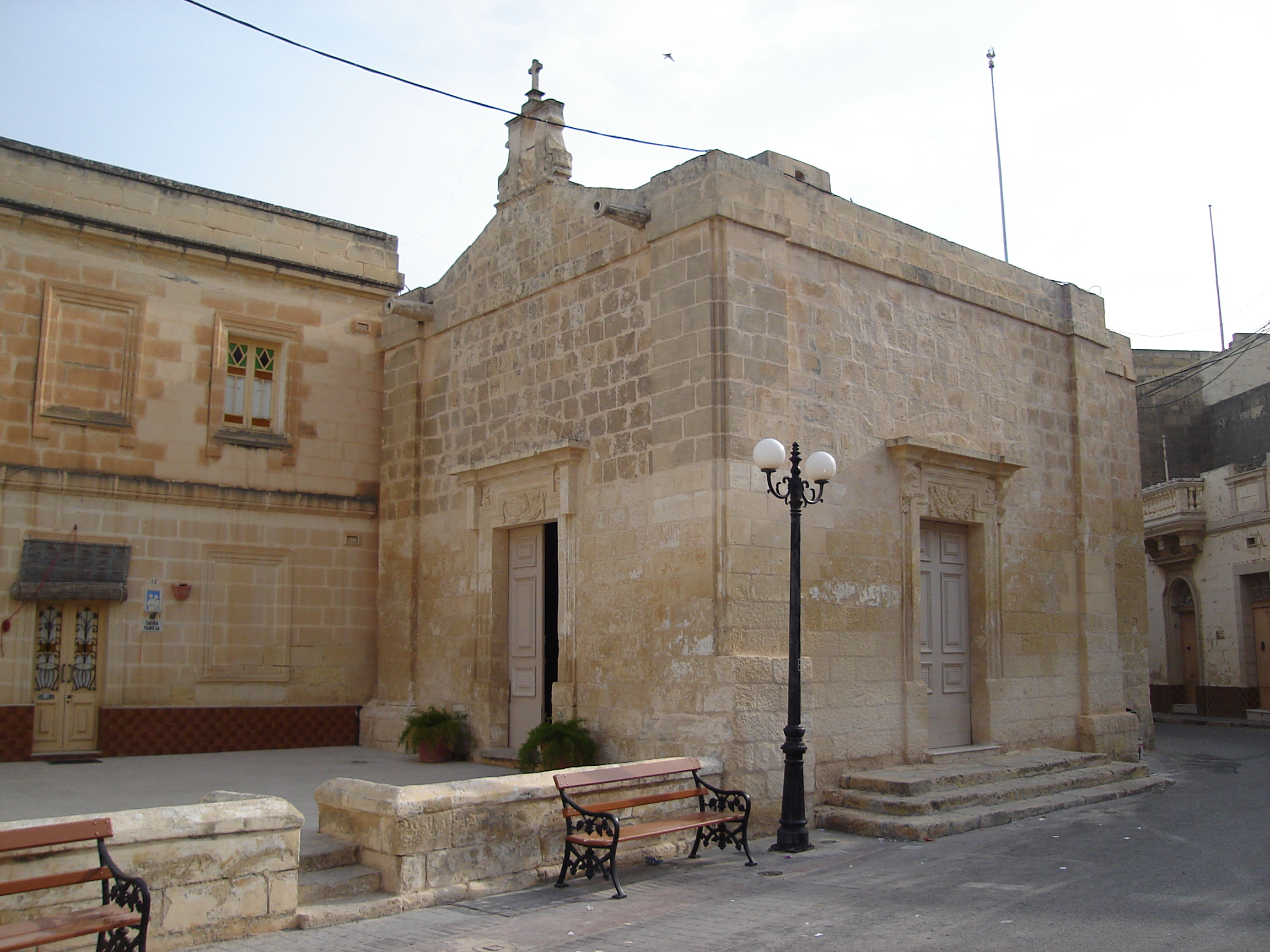
The Annunciation Church

The original name of the village was Casal Prokopju, and is retrieved from the registers of the Maltese militia that existed prior to the rule of the Order of St John. Through generations, the local population corrupted the original name, which was changed to Kirkop. The name of the village comes from the surname of a wealthy family.

The population of Kirkop was 2,659 in July 2024. This included 1,383 males and 1,276 females; 2,414 Maltese nationals and 245 foreign nationals.

== History ==
Punic remains of catacombs are found around the village of Ħal Kirkop with some of them remain unexplored, and their exploration has been shelved. In 1969, anthropologist Jeremy Boissevain published a research on the social fabric of the village in his book Hal Farrug: a village in Malta. Boissevain claims that the people of Ħal Kirkop have lived in the area for centuries because of his assumed comparable bloodline with ancient Phoenician. The Phoenicians occupied the Maltese islands around 700 B.C.

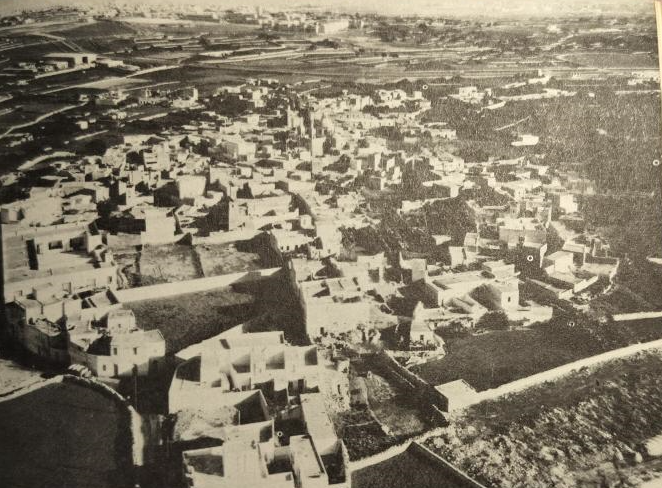
A bird's-eye view of Kirkop in the 1960s

Ħal Kirkop was part of a larger community, as part of the parish of Bir Miftuħ, in the Middle Ages until the Early Modern period. However, on 29 May 1592, it was declared a parish on its own right.

The village had a population of 2,260 people in March 2011. By March 2014 this had decreased slightly to 2,191 people. In 2021, the population was recorded at 2,527.

== Places, buildings and structures ==
In Ħal Kirkop, one finds the Menhir monolith, which has become the symbol of the village, and a number of Paleo-Christian Catacombs.

Other buildings and structures are listed monuments which include; the Church of the Annunciation, the Parish Church of St. Leonard, the Chapel St. Nicholas at the cemetery, a cross column (Is-Salib tad-Dejma), and a number of niches scattered around the village. There are two WWII shelters below street level.

== Kirkop main roads ==
- Triq Ħal Safi (Safi Road)
- Triq il-Belt Valletta (Valletta Road)
- Triq il-Lewżiet (Almonds Street)
- Triq ir-Ramlija (Sandy Street)
- Triq It-Tielet Waqgha (Third Fall Road)
- Triq l-Industrija (Industry Street)
- Triq San Benedittu (St Benedict Street)
- Triq l-Għaraq tad-Demm (Bloody Sweat Street)
- Triq San Ġwann (St John Street)
- Triq San Nikola (St Nicholas Street)
- Triq Santu Rokku (St Rocco Street)
- Triq Taż-Żebbiegħ (Taz-Zebbiegh Road)

== Band clubs ==
- St Leonard's Band Club (L-Għaqda Mużikali San Leonardu)
- St Joseph Band Club (Soċjetà Mużikali San Ġużepp Ħal Kirkop)

== Zones in Ħal Kirkop ==
- Bonu ż-Żgħir
- Il-Għadir (The Lake)
- Menħir Estate (Menhir Estate)
- Tal-Aħfar
- Tal-Ibliq
- Tal-Fieres
- Tar-Robba
- Tas-Sienja

== Twin village ==
- Rousset, France
