= 2024 Maltese local elections =

- 8 June 2024

All 476 local council seats in 68 localities.
- Turnout: 59.47% (▼3.13%)
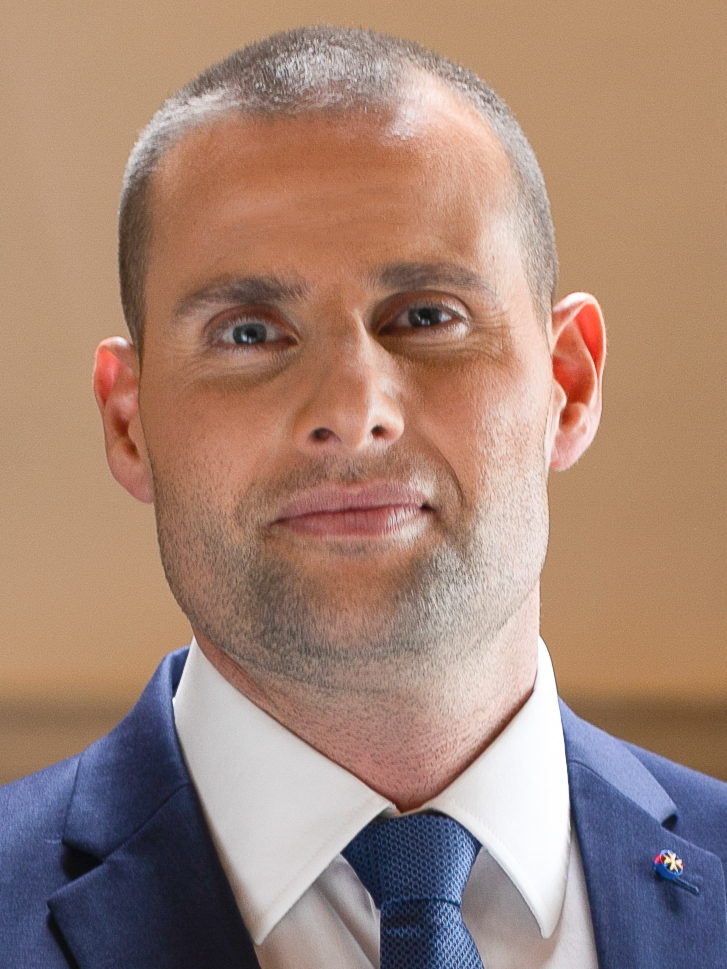

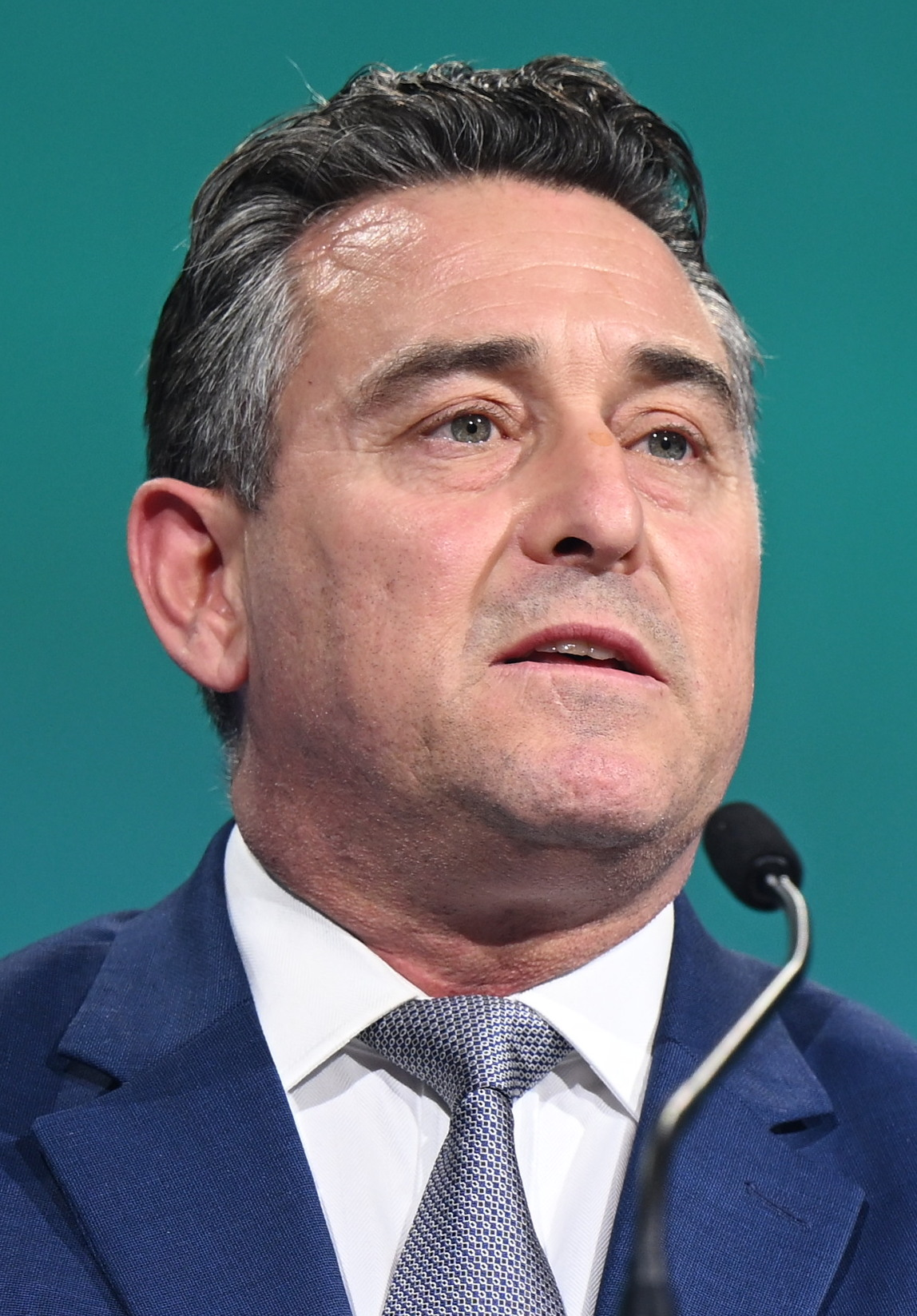

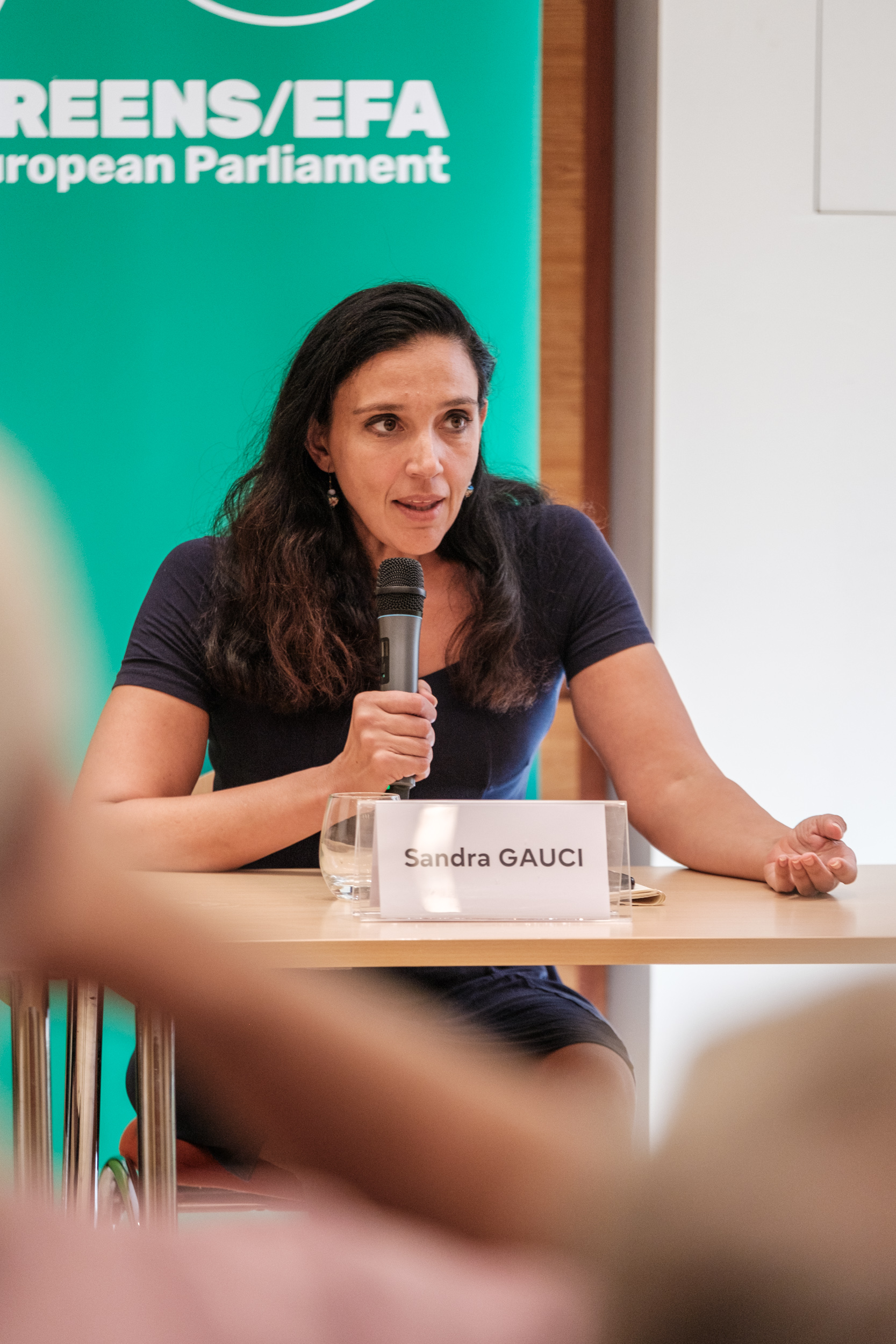
	First party	Second party	Third party
Leader	Robert Abela (Note: Not contesting a local council seat)	Bernard Grech	Sandra Gauci
Party	Labour	Nationalist	AD+PD
Last election	270 seats; 57.96%	190 seats; 39.82%	0 seats; 0.98% (Note: Combined result of Democratic Alternative and Democratic Party vote shares before party merger)
Seats before	270 / 476	190 / 476
Seats won	252 / 476	208 / 476	2 / 476
Seat change	▼15	▲20	▲2
popular vote	134,767	114,512	2,214
Percentage	52.11%	44.28%	0.82%
Swing	▼5.24%	▲4.46%	New
Councils	39	24	N/A (Note: Not enough candidates to win councils)
	Fourth party	Fifth party	Sixth party
	GĦ1	FL1	IND
Leader	David Apap	Nigel Holland
Party	Għarb First	FL	Independents
Last election	2 seats; 0.16%	0 seats, 0.05%	2 seats; 0.88%
Seats before	2 / 476		2 / 476
Seats won	2 / 476	1 / 476	6 / 476
Seat change	0	New	▲4
popular vote	591	194	6,050
Percentage	0.23%	0.08%	2.99%
Swing	▲0.07%	▲0.03%	▲2.11%
Councils	0	N/A	N/A
- The colours of the map indicate the party that achieved control of the council, but not necessarily a plurality or majority of votes.

Local council elections were held in Malta and Gozo on 8 June 2024, in tandem with the European Parliament elections. This is the second time that all local councils of Malta shall be elected simultaneously in a single election, following the 2015 reform abolishing the previous system of half-council elections.

== Background ==
=== Previous election ===
The Labour Party won an absolute majority of 268 local council seats and 48 mayoralties in the 2019 local elections, swiping control of several village councils from the Nationalist Party in a wave of electoral successes for said PL, most significant of all being the flip of Siġġiewi from PN to PL. Since the 2019 election, a firm Labour bloc in the central-south regions of Malta can be found.

Only two independents were elected in two councils in Malta and Gozo. Steven Zammit Lupi was elected to the Żebbuġ local council in Malta, and Nicky Saliba, ex-PN mayor of Żebbuġ in Gozo, was elected as an independent and managed to deadlock the council there, finally resulting in his re-election as mayor. Malta uses the single transferable vote system in all elections.

==== Party developments ====
Several parties have been founded since 2019.

Floriana First (Maltese: Floriana I-Ewwel), and Għarb First (Maltese: Għarb l-Ewwel), both unrelated localist parties, were registered immediately after the election having previously participated as ad hoc groups. The leaders are Nigel Holland and David Apap Agius respectively.

The People's Party (Maltese: Partit Popolari), a right-wing conservative anti-immigration party, was founded sometime around the summer of 2021 by Mr. Paul Salomone, starting the registration process with the Electoral Commission in June. It held its first founding press conference in November 2020. It is considered to have replaced the since-2020 inactive Moviment Patrijotti Maltin even if they are unrelated.

Alleanza Bidla (which is still registered with the Electoral Commission) de facto reformed as ABBA party by AB leader Ivan Grech Mintoff, nephew of ex-Prime Minister Dominic Mintoff. ABBA party is a right-wing, Christian party which is closely associated by Protestant-Pentecostal evangelical movement River of Love.

The Democratic Alternative, and Marlene Farrugia's Democratic Party, performed abysmally in the previous election, with AD garnering only 1977 first-preference votes (0.77%) around Malta and Gozo and losing its only local council seat in Attard held by party secretary Ralph Cassar, and PD garnering only 555 first-preference votes (0.21%), gaining no seats. Both parties would merge under the new name 'AD+PD' (pronounced and frequently rendered ADPD), retaining Carmel Cacopardo as chairman of the party and Ralph Cassar as secretarv-general. Sandra Gauci was elected chairwoman in an election on 27 May 2023.

=== Eligibility to vote ===
The Electoral Commission of Malta is obliged to update and publish an electoral register in every election. The ECM published said electoral register on 31 March 2023. Voting age is 16 for all elections in Malta. Maltese, and UK-nationals that satisfy the voting age and necessary residency requirements are eligible to vote in these local council elections.

=== Events, issues, criticism and proposals throughout the five-year term ===
Since and before 2019, there has been much criticism by the Nationalist opposition and civil society groups that Malta and Gozo local council's powers have, under a Labour Party administration, been watered down and concentrated more on Castille. A year before, the National Audit Office expressed its anger at an "alarming situation" where fifteen local councils and one regional council failed to submit their audited financial statements in November 2022.

On 8 August 2023, Ministry for Local Government launched a "national strategic vision" for Local Councils and government in Malta and Gozo. This would aim to strengthen the role of Police and the environment locally.

==== Changes to Local Government Act lowering the minimum age required for councillors to serve as mayors ====
On 11 October 2023, the Minister for Local Government Owen Bonniċi and Parliamentary Secretary Alison Żerafa Civelli unveiled a legislative process through a bill amending the Local Government Act permitting 16-17 year olds to be elected as mayors and deputy mayors of the Maltese local councils. It was approved by Cabinet on the same day. This was however not approved by an overwhelming majority of the Maltese population, and was very much derided on social media. A Times of Malta poll found that 97% of responders did not agree with the draft legislation. The idea was not really conceived by PL, as PN had proposed the exact same in a December manifesto on local government published by the party in December 2022.

If these plans are put to effect, Malta would be the first country in the EU (and the European continent) to lower the minimum age required to serve as mayor.

==== Garbage problem in various localities ====
Garbage collection in various localities around Malta and Gozo has been an issue. Some mayors such as Swieqi's Noel Muscat and Sliema's John Pillow decried an "uncontrollable" and "unbearable" garbage problem with the latter even resorting to naming and shaming. The Nationalist Party had also stated in a press conference that "councils are being faced by “immense pressure” without having any control over the situation, which is in turn affecting the country's reputation". Nationalist MP Eve Borg Bonello posted a Facebook video calling Minister for the Environment, Energy and Enterprise Miriam Dalli a "pseudo green warrior who recently faced a national embarrassment".

On 4 September 2023, Labour Party television channel ONE TV claimed through an "exclusive report" to have revealed a private recording of a voice message sent by Pillow to a Sliema resident in the advent of a Nationalist Party press conference one the same subject, where according to ONE, Pillow claimed he left garbage uncollected on purpose to show journalists the state of his town to the media in the press conference. Pillow rebutted the report as manipulative, calling it out as a "heinous lie" in a Facebook post, playing in public the concerned voice message recording in full.

==== Over development ====
Several mayors, local councils, and even minority opposition within councils without the support of said council have protested and objected several development projects around Malta and Gozo.

One of the most notable cases was the blocking of a development in Gżira where Labour Party Mayor Conrad Borg Manché and the Gżira Local Council won an appeal case against the Lands Authority which granted back to the Council jurisdiction and control of the Yacht Marina Garden, as opposed to allowing the Authority to proceed with plans to relocate the petrol station to the garden. On 8 October 2023, Borg Manché would resign from the Labour Party, claiming the party departured from its socialist principles. "The party is no longer a socialist party that fights for workers. That is why I had joined the party in the first place, and so this resignation is only natural.", he said.

In March 2023, a landmark ruling in Santa Luċija, Malta by Chief Judge Mark Chetcuti cancelled an Environment and Review Tribunal permit that proposed a 5-storey development which would have ruined the uniformity of a street containing only 2-storey houses. It is good to note that the Planning Authority had not approved this development proposal, and was only approved by the EPRT after an appeal lodged by the applicant. This appeal was again contested by Nationalist minority leader in the S. Luċija Local Council, Liam Sciberras and resident Michael Pule. In this case, the minority leader criticised Labour Party Mayor Charmaine St John and Vice-Mayor Frederick Cutajar who according to Sciberras, defended the developer instead of the resident objectors. The Local Council, at first however, did object to the project. The People's Party, in a statement also expressed its solidarity with both the residents and the local council of Santa Luċija.

Another similar case is a 20-year battle against a Ħondoq ir-Rummien "megaproject" ended also successfully for the local populace and Qala mayor Paul Buttiġieġ. "The proposed project, with a total site area of over 103,000 square metres, was divided into several zones. It included a 110-bedroom hotel set on nine floors, 25 self-catering villas, 60 self-catering apartments, 200 multi-ownership residential units consisting of apartments, maisonettes and bungalows, over 1,200 underground car-parking spaces, a chapel, administration offices, shops and restaurants."

In the Nigret area of Żurrieq, farmland is slated to become a residential area despite several objections. Activism in this village has been particularly active, with the formation of the Għaqda Residenti taż-Żurrieq (English: Żurrieq Residents Group) as a local pressure group protesting and raising funds to challenge this development. They eventually managed to raise enough money in August 2022 to take the Planning Authority to the courts over these plans, after the PA executive council also voted unanimously to allow procedure anyway of the developments.

The Rabat (Malta) Local Council also objected to the construction of a farmhouse in the 'Għeriexem Valley' area. The primary reasons for this objection are that Wied Għeriexem is a buffer zone between Rabat and Mdina and that a permitted precedent might permit more developments in that area and that the finished building will not be able to be used for residential purposes, something that the law requires it to prove. The People's Party also released a statement supporting the local council and the Rabat residents, however also proposing that 'outside development zones' or ODZs be granted constitutional protection, meaning that construction in these areas would be constrained by a 2/3 vote in Parliament or in a referendum.

==== Instances of electoral fraud ====
===== Pre-election =====
Maltese courts on 24 May 2024 annulled the ID card residence registration of 99 'ghost voters' who illegally changed such voter registration address to unfinished and uninhabitable flat addresses in Siġġiewi following a successful lawsuit per illegally registered voter by the Nationalist Party in opposition. It has to be noted that a fourth of these voters were already Siggiewi residents and their change in address would not have had any impact on the locality in which they were going to vote. The legal battle involved 22 magistrates and took three weeks. This led to housing minister Roderick Galdes being disparagingly titled 'Electoral Fraud Minister' by Opposition-affiliated media NET. This heavily implicates that the Labour Party stood to benefit from such voter address registration changes with also a win for said Labour Party further consolidated as such.

====== Voting cards issued to deceased voters ======
Ex-ABBA leader Ivan Grech Mintoff alleged in a debate on Maltese national broadcaster Television Malta that a voter who has been dead for two years has been issued a voting card for the 2024 election, stating "F'din l-elezzjoni ħa jerġgħu jivvotaw il-mejtin" (English: In this election, dead people are going to vote again). Newsbook confirmed said deceased voter's identity and document and stated that such cases were not isolated. The Electoral Commission did not answer questions sent by Newsbook on these concerns.

Similarly in August 2023, a whistleblower made claims that deceased people's identities were used to vote for the Labour Party in the 2022 general election.

== Changes in local council seat composition ==
Locality	Seats in:		Change
Locality	2019	2024	Change
Pietà	5	7	▲2
Għaxaq	5	7	▲2
Xagħra (Gozo)	5	7	▲2
Ħamrun	7	9	▲2
Marsaskala	9	11	▲2
Naxxar	9	11	▲2
San Ġwann	9	11	▲2
Cospicua (Bormla)	7	5	▼2

== Participating parties ==
From September 2023, the Nationalist Party confirmed with Newsbook that it has approved 170 candidates for these elections. The Labour Party did not answer a similar question posed by Newsbook, while AD+PD and Volt confirmed that they will be participating in the election, but were not in the situation to provide information. In October 2023 the PN said that they have more than 200 candidates. PP and ABBA were not asked.

On 29 April 2024, with the closing of the nomination period for candidates, the Electoral Commission announced that the Labour Party would be fielding 381 candidates (down 19 from last election), the Nationalist Party would be fielding 293 candidates (down 4), AD+PD 7 candidates (down from 16 in 2019), and the People's Party 4 candidates. Residenti Beltin (English: Valletta Residents) and Floriana First (down 1) shall each field a candidate, and 19 independent candidates (up from 12) shall contest seats. Volt Malta failed to follow in its plan to contest these elections and did not field any candidates. ABBA party did not field candidates nor express any intent to contest these elections.

Parties in this table are in order of representation, then with number of candidates, with independents last.
Party	Outgoing Seats	Seats contested in this election
Partit Laburista	267 / 462	381 / 476
Partit Nazzjonalista	190 / 462	293 / 476
Għarb l-Ewwel	2 / 462	4 / 476
AD+PD	New	7 / 476
Partit Popolari	New	4 / 476
Floriana l-Ewwel	New	1 / 476
Residenti Beltin	New	1 / 476
Volt Malta	New	Participation intended and initially confirmed, however failed to field candidacies.
Independents	3 / 462	19 / 476

== Results ==
=== Counting timetable ===
Counting for the local council elections took place between three days, starting on 12 June at 16:00 CET for 23 local councils out of 68. Mdina was excluded since its council had its term renewed unopposed however was part of the slew dated to be revealed on 13 June. Counting finished on 14 June with results revealed after 8pm.

Local councils and their result day,cities (città) first.
Counting and Result day	Locality
12 June 2024	Valletta, Città Umilissima
12 June 2024	Żejtun, Città Beland
12 June 2024	Żebbuġ, Malta, Città Rohan
12 June 2024	Birżebbuġa
12 June 2024	St. Julian's
12 June 2024	Tarxien
12 June 2024	Iklin
12 June 2024	Żurrieq
12 June 2024	Saint Paul's Bay
12 June 2024	Pembroke
12 June 2024	Ta' Xbiex
12 June 2024	Saint Venera
12 June 2024	Għajnsielem, Gozo
12 June 2024	Mellieħa
12 June 2024	Mqabba
12 June 2024	Qrendi
12 June 2024	Nadur
12 June 2024	Marsa
12 June 2024	Fontana, Gozo
12 June 2024	Balzan
12 June 2024	Dingli
12 June 2024	Għasri, Gozo
12 June 2024	Xewkija
13 June 2024	Rabat / Città Victoria, Gozo
13 June 2024	Żabbar, Città Hompesch
13 June 2024	Bormla, Città Cospicua
13 June 2024	Fgura
13 June 2024	Marsaskala
13 June 2024	Sliema
13 June 2024	Birkirkara
13 June 2024	Rabat, Malta
13 June 2024	Gudja
13 June 2024	Lija
13 June 2024	Marsaxlokk
13 June 2024	Msida
13 June 2024	Kalkara
13 June 2024	Saint John (the Baptist)
13 June 2024	Mġarr
13 June 2024	Paola
13 June 2024	Għaxaq
13 June 2024	Għarb, Gozo
13 June 2024	Xagħra, Gozo
13 June 2024	Ta' Sannat, Gozo
13 June 2024	Tal-Pietà
14 June 2024	Birgu, Città Vittoriosa
14 June 2024	Qormi, Città Pinto
14 June 2024	Isla, Città Invicta
14 June 2024	Siġġiewi, Città Ferdinand
14 June 2024	Swieqi
14 June 2024	Attard
14 June 2024	Naxxar
14 June 2024	Mosta
14 June 2024	Santa Luċija
14 June 2024	Floriana
14 June 2024	Luqa
14 June 2024	Ħamrun
14 June 2024	Għargħur
14 June 2024	Gżira
14 June 2024	Kirkop
14 June 2024	Mtarfa
14 June 2024	San Lawrenz, Gozo
14 June 2024	Xgħajra
14 June 2024	Ħal-Safi
14 June 2024	Munxar, Gozo
14 June 2024	Qala, Gozo
14 June 2024	Kerċem, Gozo
14 June 2024	Żebbuġ, Gozo

=== Nationwide vote ===
Party	First-preference votes			Seats	
Party	Quantity	%	±	Quantity	±
Partit Laburista	134,767	52.11	5.85 pp	253	▼15
Partit Nazzjonalista	114,512	44.28	+4.46 pp	212	▲20
AD+PD	2,124	0.82	New	2	New
Għarb l-Ewwel	591	0.23	+0.07 pp	2	0
Partit Popolari	227	0.09	New	0	New
Floriana l-Ewwel	194	0.08	New	1	New
Residenti Beltin	150	0.06	New	0	New
Independents	6,050	2.34	+2.11 pp	6	▲4
Councils with no overall control:					5
TOTALS:
Valid votes:	258,615	94.9%		476	▲12
Blank + Invalid votes:	13,992	5.1%		476	▲12
Turnout:					59.47%

Popular vote
PL	52.11%
PN	44.28%
AD+PD	0.82%
GĦ1	0.23%
PP	0.09%
FL1	0.08%
RB	0.06%
Independents	2.34%
Blank ballots	5.1%

=== Results by council ===
Locality	Labour Party		Nationalist Party		AD and/or Others		Control	
Locality	%	Seats	%	Seats	%	Seats	Before Election	After Election
Attard	22.2	2	70.6	6	7.2	1	PN	PN
Balzan	23.4	1	69.7	4	6.7	–	PN	PN
Birgu	73.8	4	21.5	1	4.7	–	PL	PL
Birkirkara	41.7	6	47.5	6	10.8	1	PL	No overall control
Birżebbuġa	67.6	6	29.0	3	3.5	–	PL	PL
Cospicua	85.5	5	14.5	-	–	–	PL	PL
Dingli	65.4	3	34.6	2	–	–	PL	PL
Fgura	71.5	7	28.5	2	1.2	0	PL	PL
Floriana	43.6	2	31.0	2	25.4	1	PL	No overall control
Fontana	38.9	2	51.7	3	9.5	–	PN	PN
Għajnsielem	29.3	1	70.7	4	–	–	PN	PN
Għarb	31.4	2	12.3	1	56.3	2	No overall control	No overall control
Għargħur	37.7	2	62.3	3	–	–	PN	PN
Għasri	59.4	3	40.6	2	–	–	PN	PL
Għaxaq	77.6	6	22.4	1	–	–	PL	PL
Gudja	61.1	3	38.9	2	-	0	PL	PL
Gżira	49.2	5	32.4	3	18.5	1	PL	PL
Ħamrun	64.2	6	33.4	3	2.6	-	PL	PL
Iklin	35.2	2	64.8	3	–	–	PN	PN
Kalkara	69.1	4	30.9	1	–	–	PL	PL
Kerċem	48.5	2	51.5	3	–	–	PN	PN
Kirkop	69.5	4	30.5	1	-	-	PL	PL
Lija	29.2	1	70.8	4	–	–	PN	PN
Luqa	65.3	5	34.8	2	–	–	PL	PL
Marsa	77.5	6	22.5	1	-	-	PL	PL
Marsaskala	62.6	7	32.6	4	4.9	0	PL	PL
Marsaxlokk	64.1	3	22.6	1	13.4	1	PL	PL
Mdina	–	1	–	4	–	–	PN	PN
Mellieħa	41.4	4	49.1	4	9.5	1	PL	No overall control
Mġarr	33.2	2	58.1	3	8.7	–	PN	PN
Mosta	44.0	6	56.0	7	–	–	PL	PN
Mqabba	55.7	3	44.3	2	–	–	PL	PL
Msida	46.3	4	48.7	5	5.0	0	PL	PN
Mtarfa	56.9	3	43.1	2	–	–	PL	PL
Munxar	23.5	1	76.5	4	–	–	PN	PN
Nadur	42.4	2	57.7	3	–	–	PN	PN
Naxxar	34.5	4	65.5	7	4.2	0	PN	PN
Paola	70.9	5	29.1	2	–	–	PL	PL
Pembroke	51.1	3	48.9	2	–	–	PL	PL
Pietà	51.4	3	42.5	2	6.1	–	PL	PL
Qala	52.8	3	47.2	2	–	–	PL	PL
Qormi	63.8	7	36.2	4	–	–	PL	PL
Qrendi	62.8	3	37.2	2	-	-	PL	PL
Rabat	55.4	5	44.6	4	–	–	PL	PL
Safi	57.7	3	42.4	2	–	–	PL	PL
St. Julian's	33.4	3	66.6	6	-	-	PN	PN
St. Paul's Bay	41.5	5	50.1	7	8.4	1	PL	PN
San Ġwann	45.5	5	54.5	6	–	–	PL	PN
San Lawrenz	33.5	2	66.5	3	–	–	PN	PN
Sannat	72.4	4	27.6	1	–	–	PL	PL
Santa Luċija	62.3	3	37.8	2	–	–	PL	PL
Santa Venera	56.3	4	43.7	3	–	–	PL	PL
Senglea	80.1	4	19.1	1	–	–	PL	PL
Siġġiewi	41.9	3	58.1	4	–	–	PL	PN
Sliema	21.4	3	78.6	10	-	-	PN	PN
Swieqi	16.3	1	83.8	8	–	–	PN	PN
Tarxien	73.5	5	26.5	2	-	-	PL	PL
Valletta	55.4	4	38.7	3	5.9	0	PL	PL
Victoria	43.0	3	57.1	4	–	–	PN	PN
Ta' Xbiex	58.7	3	41.3	2	–	–	PL	PL
Xagħra	54.3	4	45.7	3	–	–	PL	PL
Xewkija	58.9	3	33.3	2	7.8	–	PL	PL
Xgħajra	86.7	4	13.3	1	-	-	PL	PL
Żabbar	71.8	8	28.2	3	–	–	PL	PL
Żebbuġ (Città Rohan)	40.4	4	27.4	3	31.9	2	PL	No overall control
Żebbuġ	45.2	2	54.8	3	-	-	No overall control	PN
Żejtun	76.6	7	23.4	2	–	–	PL	PL
Żurrieq	70.6	6	29.4	3	–	–	PL	PL
