= 2019 Maltese local elections =

2019 Maltese local council elections
- 25 May 2019
- Turnout: 62.69%
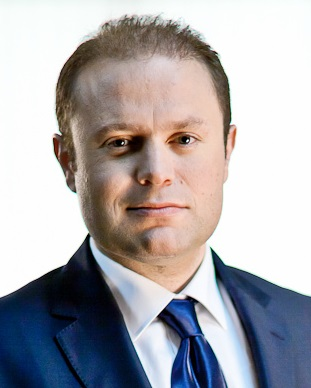

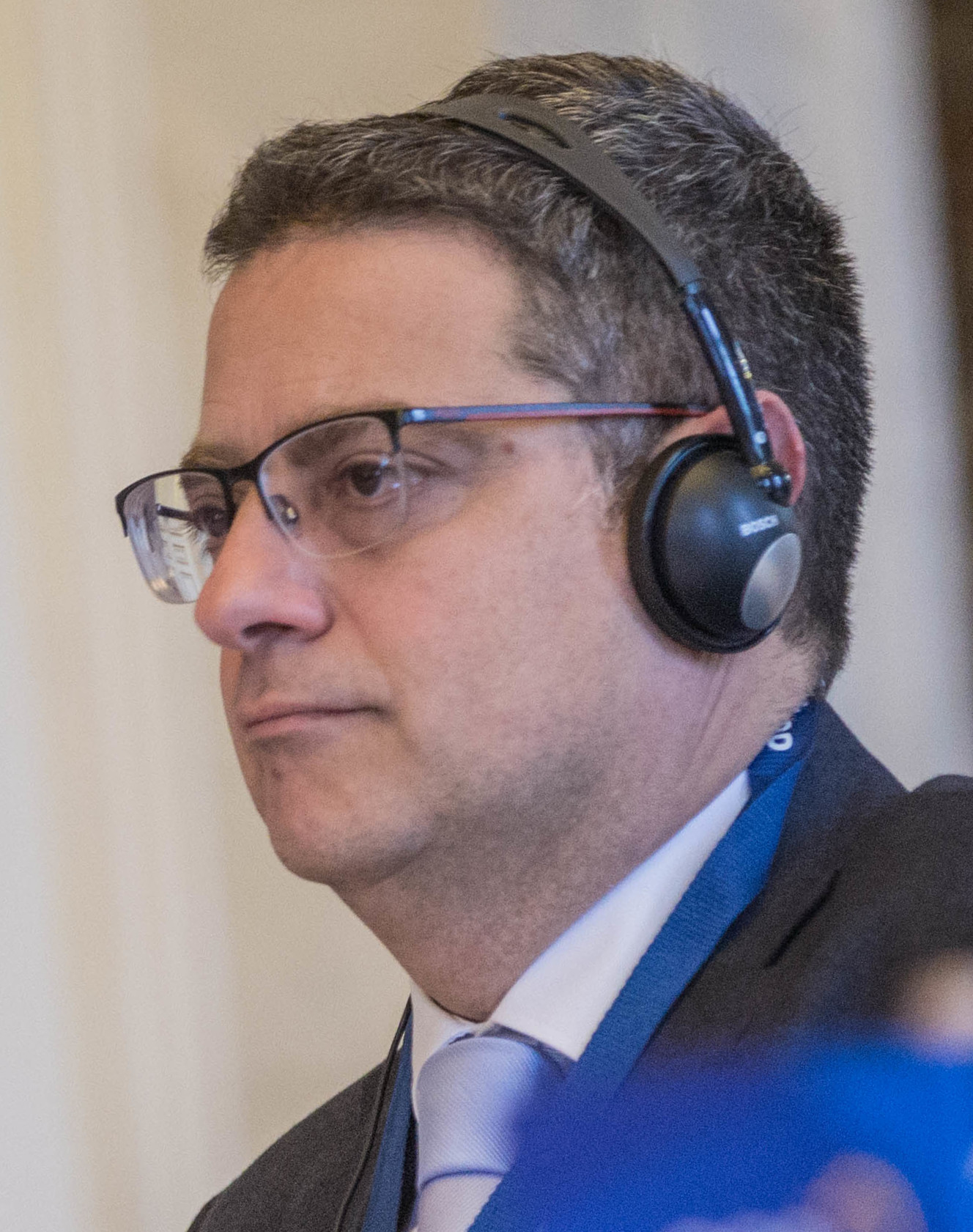
Party	Labour	Nationalist	Democratic Alternative
Popular vote	150,514	103,398	1,997
Percentage	57.96%	39.82%	0.77%
Party	Democratic Party (Malta)	Għarb First
Popular vote	555
Percentage	0.21%	0.16%
Party	Moviment Patrijotti Maltin
Percentage	0.14%
- Party with plurality of votes by council, except for Mdina, where no election was held, thus won by a 4-councillor PN victory.

Local council elections were held in Malta by 25 May 2019. For the first time, all 68 municipal council were renewed at the same time, following a reform partially initiated in the 2015 election, in which half were.

== Results ==
=== Overall results ===
The election was not held in Mdina, since the number of candidates was equal to the number of seats. Therefore, the five candidates were directly elected. Turnout was under 40% in Gżira, Sliema, St. Julian's and St. Paul's Bay.

Party	Votes	%	Seats
Labour Party	150,514	57.96	270
Nationalist Party	103,398	39.82	190
Democratic Alternative	1,997	0.77	0
Democratic Party	555	0.21	0
Għarb l-Ewwel	417	0.16	2
Moviment Patrijotti Maltin	376	0.14	0
Floriana l-Ewwel	141	0.05	0
Independents	2,276	0.88	2
Total	259,674	100.00	464
Valid votes	259,674	95.62	
Invalid/blank votes	11,895	4.38	
Total votes	271,569	100.00	
Registered voters/turnout	433,596	62.63	
Source: Electoral Commission

=== Results by council ===
Locality	Labour Party		Nationalist Party		AD and/or Others		Control
Locality	%	Seats	%	Seats	%	Seats	Party
Attard	28.9	3	65.5	6	5.8	0	PN
Balzan	27.9	1	72.2	4	–	–	PN
Birgu	81.2	4	18.9	1	–	–	PL
Birkirkara	52.3	7	43.7	6	4.2	0	PL
Birżebbuġa	76.0	7	24.1	2	–	–	PL
Cospicua	84.2	6	15.8	1	–	–	PL
Dingli	73.9	5	26.2	1	–	–	PL
Fgura	74.0	7	24.9	2	1.2	0	PL
Floriana	58.7	3	31.2	2	10.3	0	PL
Fontana	52.1	2	48.0	3	–	–	PN
Għajnsielem	31.4	1	68.7	4	–	–	PN
Għarb	44.8	2	12.3	1	42.9	2	No overall control
Għargħur	45.7	2	54.4	3	–	–	PN
Għasri	46.1	2	54.0	3	–	–	PN
Għaxaq	79.3	4	20.8	1	–	–	PL
Gudja	62.8	3	33.5	2	3.8	0	PL
Gżira	59.7	5	37.7	4	2.8	0	PL
Ħamrun	62.9	5	33.9	2	3.5	0	PL
Iklin	43.6	2	56.5	3	–	–	PN
Kalkara	72.6	4	27.5	1	–	–	PL
Kerċem	34.1	2	66.0	3	–	–	PN
Kirkop	64.6	3	30.3	2	5.3	0	PL
Lija	34.0	2	66.1	3	–	–	PN
Luqa	73.8	5	26.3	2	–	–	PL
Marsa	72.9	6	21.5	1	5.8	0	PL
Marsaskala	69.7	7	26.3	2	4.2	0	PL
Marsaxlokk	78.4	5	21.7	1	–	–	PL
Mdina	–	1	–	4	–	–	PN
Mellieħa	48.5	5	47.2	4	4.4	0	PL
Mġarr	41.6	2	58.5	3	–	–	PN
Mosta	51.5	7	48.6	6	–	–	PL
Mqabba	64.1	3	36.0	2	–	–	PL
Msida	51.0	5	44.8	4	4.4	0	PL
Mtarfa	63.1	3	37.0	2	–	–	PL
Munxar	48.1	2	52.0	3	–	–	PN
Nadur	42.4	2	57.7	3	–	–	PN
Naxxar	36.9	4	59.1	5	4.2	0	PN
Paola	74.7	5	25.4	2	–	–	PL
Pembroke	60.8	3	39.3	2	–	–	PL
Pietà	69.4	3	30.7	2	–	–	PL
Qala	70.3	3	29.8	2	–	–	PL
Qormi	64.6	7	35.5	4	–	–	PL
Qrendi	69.6	4	28.1	1	2.4	0	PL
Rabat	57.0	5	43.1	4	–	–	PL
Safi	63.5	3	36.6	2	–	–	PL
St. Julian's	35.8	3	58.6	6	5.8	0	PN
St. Paul's Bay	50.2	7	42.9	6	7.2	0	PL
San Ġwann	50.7	5	49.4	4	–	–	PL
San Lawrenz	29.8	1	70.3	4	–	–	PN
Sannat	77.1	4	23.0	1	–	–	PL
Santa Luċija	76.4	4	23.7	1	–	–	PL
Santa Venera	58.6	4	41.5	3	–	–	PL
Senglea	79.2	4	20.9	1	–	–	PL
Siġġiewi	50.7	4	49.4	3	–	–	PL
Sliema	25.3	3	70.7	10	4.0	0	PN
Swieqi	23.1	2	76.9	7	–	–	PN
Tarxien	73.8	5	25.0	2	1.2		PL
Valletta	53.0	4	45.9	3	1.1	0	PL
Victoria	41.0	3	59.1	4	–	–	PN
Ta' Xbiex	62.5	3	37.5	2	–	–	PL
Xagħra	66.0	4	34.0	1	–	–	PL
Xewkija	62.9	4	37.2	1	–	–	PL
Xgħajra	82.0	4	15.5	1	2.5	0	PL
Żabbar	75.3	9	24.8	2	–	–	PL
Żebbuġ (Città Rohan)	58.9	5	27.6	3	13.5	1	PL
Żebbuġ	40.7	2	43.1	2	16.2	1	No overall control
Żejtun	80.1	7	20.0	2	–	–	PL
Żurrieq	76.4	7	23.7	2	–	–	PL
