= 2012 Maltese local elections =

Maltese election

- March 10, 2012
- Registered: 192,257
- Turnout: 113,790 - 59.2%
	Majority party	Minority party	Third party
Party	Labour	Nationalist	Democratic Alternative
Popular vote	61,751	46,409	1,797
	Fourth party	Fifth party	Sixth party
Party	Floriana l-Ewwel	For a Better; Ħaż-Żebbuġ	Siġġiewi Brass Band
Popular vote	182	154	141
	Seventh party	Eighth party
Party	Better	Independent
Popular vote	62	421

Local elections were held in Malta on Saturday, 10 March 2012. Turnout was relatively low for the country, at 59.2%, poor weather conditions being blamed.

Elections were held to elect the local councils of Attard, Balzan, Birgu, Birżebbuġa, Dingli, Floriana, Gżira, Għargħur, Ħamrun, Iklin, Isla, Kirkop, Luqa, Marsa, Marsaxlokk, Mosta, Paola, Qormi, Safi, San Giljan, San Pawl Il-Bahar, Santa Lucija, Siġġiewi, Swieqi, Tas-Sliema, Żebbuġ (Malta), Żurrieq, Għajnsielem, Kercem, Munxar, Nadur, Qala, San Lawrenz, Xagħra and Żebbuġ (Gozo).

== Results ==
Party	Votes	%	Seats
Labour Party	61,751	55.67	74
Nationalist Party	46,409	41.84	63
Democratic Alternative	1,797	1.62	2
Floriana l-Ewwel (Note: only in Floriana)	182	0.16	1
For a Better Ħaż-Żebbuġ. (Note: only in Żebbuġ, Malta)	154	0.14	–
Siġġiewi Brass Band (Note: only in Siġġiewi)	141	0.13	–
Better (Note: only in Sliema)	62	0.06	–
Independents	421	0.38	–
Total	110,917	100.00	140
Valid votes	110,917	97.48	
Invalid/blank votes	2,873	2.52	
Total votes	113,790	100.00	
Registered voters/turnout	192,257	59.19	
Source: Electoral Commission of Malta
