= St Paul's Church, Munxar =

St Paul's Church
- The Parish Church of St Paul's Shipwreck
- Il-knisja Parrokjali ta' San Pawl
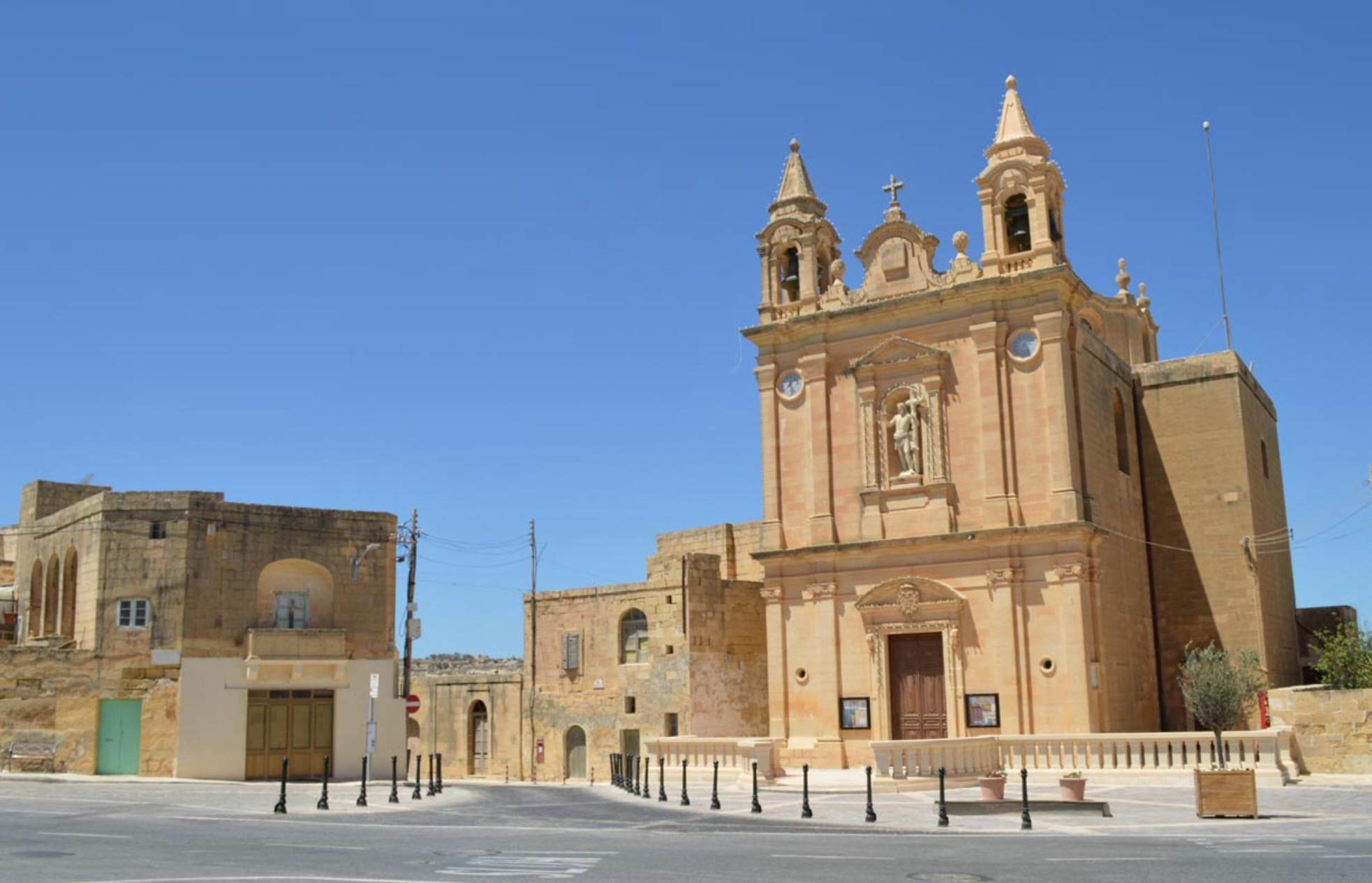
- St Paul's Church
- 36°01′51.4″N 14°14′05.0″E
- Location: Munxar, Gozo, Malta
- Denomination: Roman Catholic

History
- Status: Active
- Dedication: St Paul
- Consecrated: 12 December 1957

Architecture
- Functional status: Parish church
- Architectural type: Church
- Groundbreaking: 1914
- Completed: 1921

Specifications
- Materials: Limestone

Administration
- Archdiocese: Malta
- Parish: Munxar

Clergy
- Rector: Michael Said

St Paul's Church is a 20th century Roman Catholic parish church located in the village of Munxar on the island of Gozo in Malta.

== History ==
Prior to the building of the first church, the villagers used to attend services at the Church of St Margaret in Sannat, which church also served as the parish church of Munxar. As the population grew there were petitions for the building of a church in Munxar. A small chapel dedicated to St Paul was built on the spot of the current church, during the late 19th century. After some years another petition was made to rebuild a larger church. Construction started on 2 February 1914, and was completed by 1921. It was consecrated on 18 October 1925. Munxar became an independent parish from Sannat on 12 December 1957, and the church of St Paul became the parish church of Munxar.
