= 2007 Maltese local elections =

- March 10, 2007
- Registered: 102,294
- Turnout: 69,514 - 68%
| Party | Labour | Nationalist | Democratic Alternative |
| Popular vote | 35,795 | 29,533 | 1,444 |
| Percentage | 53.20% | 43.89% | 2.15% |
| Party | Floriana l-Ewwel | Social Agenda for Floriana | Regatta Club; Birżebbuġa |
| Popular vote | 137 | 134 | 80 |
| Percentage | 0.20% | 0.20% | 0.12% |
| Party | Independents |
| Popular vote | 159 |
| Percentage | 0.24% |

Local elections were held in 22 localities in Malta on 10 March 2007. The last round of elections held in 2004, on the same day of the national election for the Maltese Members for the European Parliament (MEPs). Approximately 68% of the eligible voters turned up on election day. With the locality of Safi with the highest percentage (86%); and the locality of Swieqi with the lowest percentage (53%). The largest locality was that of Mosta and the smallest one was that of San Lawrenz, Gozo.

== Turnout ==
| Locality | % of voters | votes |
|---|---|---|
| Safi | 86% | 1281 |
| Kerċem | 81% | 1123 |
| San Lawrenz | 78% | 428 |
| Floriana | 77% | 1492 |
| Qala | 77% | 1201 |
| Santa Luċija | 77% | 2002 |
| Marsaxlokk | 76% | 1872 |
| Siġġiewi (Città Ferdinand) | 74% | 4500 |
| Luqa | 73% | 3507 |
| Birgu (Città Vittoriosa) | 72% | 1659 |
| Mosta | 70% | 9855 |
| Munxar | 70% | 795 |
| Xagħra | 70% | 2596 |
| Ħamrun | 69% | 5510 |
| Qormi (Città Pinto) | 66% | 8776 |
| Paola (Raħal Ġdid) | 66% | 4433 |
| Birżebbuġa | 65% | 4270 |
| Gżira | 65% | 3645 |
| Attard | 64% | 4816 |
| Għargħur | 62% | 1132 |
| Żebbuġ, Gozo | 59% | 1307 |
| Swieqi | 53% | 3314 |
| Total in all | 68% | |

== Results ==
The Malta Labour Party (MLP) has won the Local Councils Elections with 53% of first count votes. The Partit Nazzjonalista (PN) obtained 44% while Alternativa Demokratika (AD) obtained 2%. The councillors elected consist of 74 councilors with MLP; 63 councillors with PN; 2 councillors with AD; and 1 councillor on the locality of Floriana, that consist with the group known as Floriana l-Ewwel.

=== Results table ===
| Party | Votes | % | Seats |
|---|---|---|---|
| Labour Party | 35,795 | 53.20 | 74 |
| Nationalist Party | 29,533 | 43.89 | 63 |
| Democratic Alternative | 1,444 | 2.15 | 2 |
| Floriana l-Ewwel (Note: only in Floriana) | 137 | 0.20 | 1 |
| Social Agenda for Floriana | 159 | 0.24 | – |
| Birżebbuġa Regatta Club (Note: only in Birżebbuġa) | 80 | 0.12 | – |
| Independents | 134 | 0.20 | – |
| Total | 67,282 | 100.00 | 140 |
| Valid votes | 67,282 | 96.79 | |
| Invalid/blank votes | 2,232 | 3.21 | |
| Total votes | 69,514 | 100.00 | |
| Registered voters/turnout | 102,294 | 67.96 | |
Source: Electoral Commission of Malta

=== Results by Locality ===
| Locality | MLP | PN | AD | ind |
|---|---|---|---|---|
| Birgu (Città Vittoriosa) | 4 | 1 | 0 | 0 |
| Qormi (Città Pinto) | 7 | 4 | 0 | 0 |
| Siġġiewi (Città Ferdinand) | 3 | 4 | 0 | 0 |
| Attard | 2 | 4 | 1 | 0 |
| Birżebbuġa | 5 | 2 | 0 | 0 |
| Floriana | 2 | 2 | 0 | 1 |
| Gżira | 4 | 3 | 0 | 0 |
| Għargħur | 2 | 3 | 0 | 0 |
| Ħamrun | 5 | 4 | 0 | 0 |
| Kerċem | 2 | 3 | 0 | 0 |
| Luqa | 5 | 2 | 0 | 0 |
| Marsaxlokk | 4 | 1 | 0 | 0 |
| Mosta | 6 | 5 | 0 | 0 |
| Munxar | 2 | 3 | 0 | 0 |
| Paola (Raħal Ġdid) | 5 | 2 | 0 | 0 |
| Qala | 2 | 3 | 0 | 0 |
| Safi | 2 | 3 | 0 | 0 |
| San Lawrenz | 2 | 3 | 0 | 0 |
| Santa Luċija | 4 | 1 | 0 | 0 |
| Swieqi | 1 | 5 | 1 | 0 |
| Xagħra | 3 | 2 | 0 | 0 |
| Żebbuġ, Gozo | 2 | 3 | 0 | 0 |
| Total (140 councillors) | 74 | 63 | 2 | 1 |
