= Iċ-Ċnus to tal-Bardan Cliffs Important Bird Area =

Important Bird Area in Malta

Coordinates: 36°01′N 14°14′E

The iċ-Ċnus to tal-Bardan Cliffs Important Bird Area comprises a 19 ha linear strip of cliffed coastline in Munxar and Sannat, on the southern coast of the island of Gozo, part of the Maltese islands. Its steep and rugged cliffs rise from sea level to a height of 128 m. It was identified as an Important Bird Area (IBA) by BirdLife International because it supports 30 breeding pairs of yelkouan shearwaters.

== See also ==
- List of birds of Malta
