= Floriana l-Ewwel =

Localist political party in Floriana, Malta

Floriana First Floriana l-Ewwel
- Abbreviation: FL
- President: Nigel Holland
- Secretary: Charles Debono
- Treasurer: Raymond Scerri
- Registered: 2 April 2019
- Headquarters: 13, FL 2, Pietro Floriani Road, Floriana
- Ideology: Floriana localism
- Political position: Syncretic
- Colors: Green
- Mayors of localities: 1 / 68
- Local council seats: 1 / 5

Floriana First (Maltese: Floriana l-Ewwel), is a localist party located in and operating in Floriana, Malta. It is one of two localist parties in the Republic of Malta, the other being Għarb l-Ewwel in Gozo. Its candidates have erroneously been repeatedly mentioned as independent candidates by Maltese media and newspapers, partially owing to its founder Holland's previous history as an independent mayor of Floriana.

== Leadership ==
The party is lead since its inception by founder Nigel Holland, who served as Mayor of Floriana three times, between 1998–2004 as an independent, and 2007–12, 2012–15 as part of the Floriana l-Ewwel grouping. Holland was elected in 2024 and serves as mayor of Floriana as an independent in coalition with the Nationalist Party councillors in the council, after an initial deadlock

== Registration ==
The party registered its statutes with the Electoral Commission of Malta on 2 April 2019, just in time for the 2019 local elections, however it previously contested the March 2007 and 2013 elections in an unregistered state at a time where local elections permitted the formation of ad hoc groups.

== Electoral history ==
The party has contested the March 2007 and 2013 local elections, winning 1 seat out of the 5 Floriana Local Council seats every election. Nigel Holland lost his seat, and therefore the only seat belonging to the party in the 2019 elections, where his vote share went down by 41 votes to 141 votes from 182 votes in 2012. A surge of 53 votes (representing an increase of 6.45%) returned Holland to the local council in 2024.

=== Local Council Elections (Floriana) ===
| Election | Leader | Votes | % | Contested Seats | Elected Seats | +/- Share | +/– Seats | Rank | Status |
|---|---|---|---|---|---|---|---|---|---|
| 2007 | Nigel Holland | 137 | 9.43 / 100 | 1 / 5 | 1 / 5 | New | | | Coalition; PN-FL1 |
| 2012 | Nigel Holland | 182 | 13.78 / 100 | 1 / 5 | 1 / 5 | +4.35% | 0 | 3rd | Coalition; PN-FL1 |
| 2019 | Nigel Holland | 141 | 10.22 / 100 | 2 / 5 | 0 / 5 | -3.56% | ▼1 | 3rd | Extra-parliamentary |
| 2024 | Nigel Holland | 194 | 16.67 / 100 | 1 / 5 | 1 / 5 | +6.45% | ▲1 | 3rd | Coalition; PN-FL1 |
