= Church of St Margaret, Sannat =

Church of St Margaret
- The Matrix Parish church of St Margaret
- Il-Knisja Matriċi u Arċipretali ta' Santa Margerita
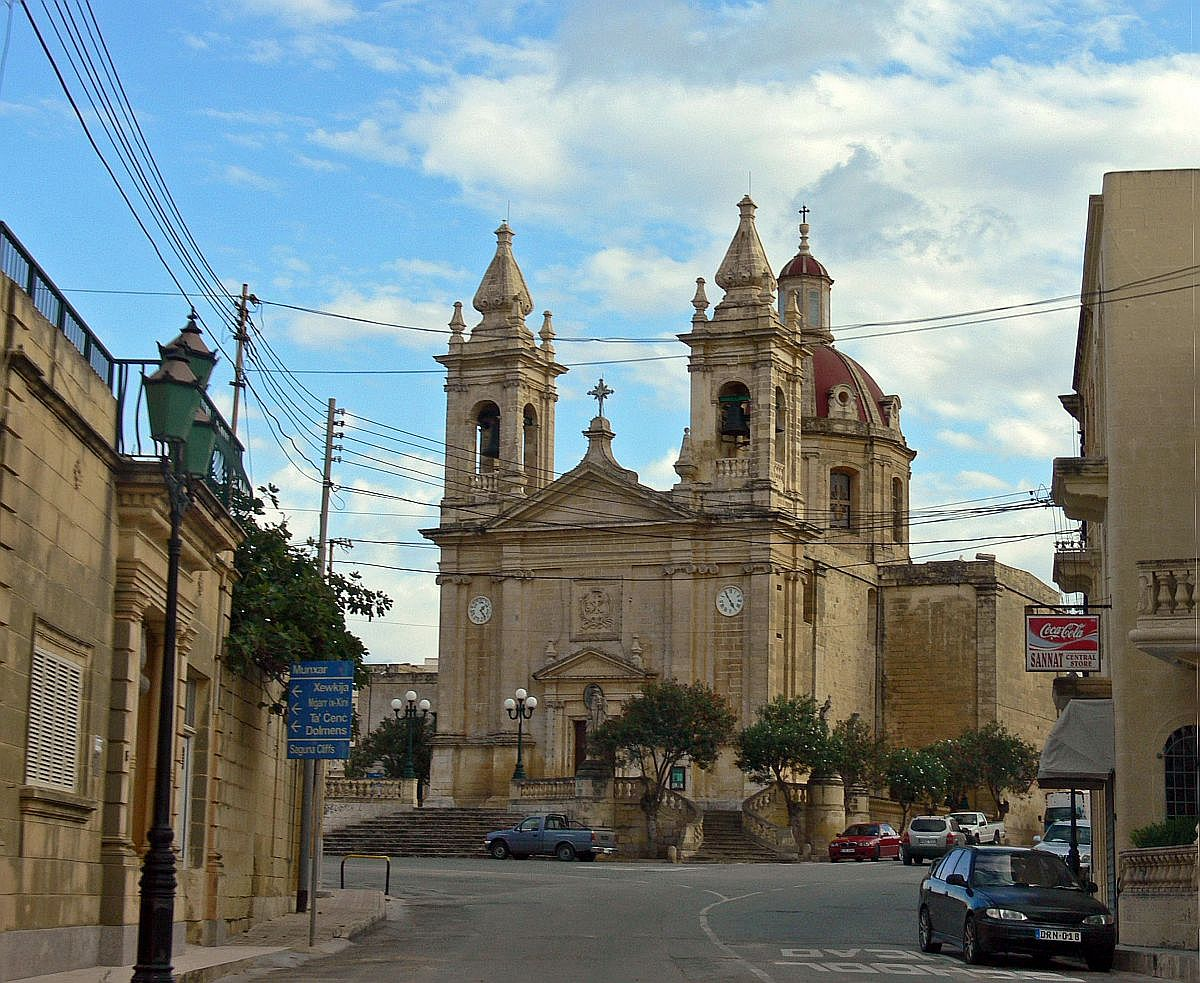
- Church of St Margaret
- 36°01′36″N 14°14′34″E
- Location: Sannat, Gozo, Malta
- Denomination: Roman Catholic
- Website: www.sannatparish.com

History
- Status: Active
- Dedication: St Margaret of Antioch
- Consecrated: 19 October 1755

Architecture
- Functional status: Parish church
- Architectural type: Church
- Style: Baroque

Administration
- Diocese: Gozo
- Parish: Sannat

The Parish church of St Margaret is a Roman Catholic church that serves the village of Sannat in Gozo, Malta

== History ==
The original church dedicated to Saint Margaret of Antioch dates back to the late Middle Ages. It is documented as functioning in 1575. It is also recorded that in the 16th century the church had a cemetery and a bell tower. When the parish of Sannat was created on April 28, 1688 by Bishop Davide Cocco Palmieri, the chapel of St Margaret was chosen as the new parish church of Sannat and neighbouring Munxar. Prior to this, the localities of Sannat and Munxar were part of the parish of St George in Rabat. In fact it was one of the first parishes to be established in Gozo after the original parish of St George.

As the population of the two localities grew it was decided to build a new and larger church. Work commenced in 1718 and when finished, was consecrated on October 19, 1755. The new church was built in the form of a Latin cross. The church was enlarged in the 1860s and blessed once work terminated on 22 November 1868. The two spires and the dome were built later in 1910. The parish church was raised to the Archipresbyteral status on 27 December 1893 and on December 12, 1957 the parish church became a matrix when Munxar became an independent parish.

The church building is listed on the National Inventory of the Cultural Property of the Maltese Islands.

== Works of art ==
The titular painting depicting St Margaret of Antioch was done by local artist Stefano Erardi. The original titular statue of St Margaret was first brought to Sannat in 1863. In 1891 the statue was replaced by the present one. The feast in honour of St Margaret is celebrated every year on the 4th Sunday of July.
