= Andrew Micallef =

Maltese painter and musician (born 1969)

- Born: 7 February 1969 (age 57); Żebbuġ, State of Malta
- Occupation: Painter
- Style: Neo-realism
- Spouse: Fiona Micallef née Hiher
- Children: 2
- Website: www.micallefandrew.com

Andrew Micallef (born 7 February 1969) is a Maltese painter and musician. He is known for his highly detailed paintings of Maltese flora and fauna, landscapes, seascapes and architecture. He has held numerous solo exhibitions, and has also illustrated books and designed stamps. He is also a professional chromatic button accordion player.

== Biography ==
Micallef was born on 7 February 1969, and he grew up in the city of Żebbuġ. He became familiar with the countryside and developed an interest in birds at a young age, through accompanying his father while hunting. He attended school in Żebbuġ before studying graphic design at the School of Art and Craft in Tat-Tarġa, Mosta.

Micallef lives in Għargħur. He married Fiona née Hiher in 1997, and they have two daughters: Martina and Luisa.

== Style and career ==
Micallef mainly works in acrylic on canvas or board, but he also has works in other media such as pen and ink. His paintings are known for their attention to detail, and he described himself as a "neo-realist". The subjects of his paintings include birds and other flora and fauna, as well as Maltese landscapes, seascapes and architecture. He was inspired by the work of the American artist John James Audubon, and he is known to make extensive studies of flora and fauna for his paintings.

Micallef's first personal exhibition was held in December 1986 at the annex of St John's Co-Cathedral in Valletta, and it consisted of paintings of birds. His second exhibition, which had the same subject, was held at the National Museum of Natural History in Mdina in June 1989. His third exhibition consisted of a different subject, architectural heritage, and it was held at the National Museum of Fine Arts in Valletta in August 1999. He has held a number of other exhibitions since then.

Micallef also illustrated a number of books, the first of which was Flora u Fawna ta' Malta (Flora and Fauna of Malta) in 1995. He designed nine sets of postage stamps for MaltaPost between 1999 and 2006 and between 2018 and 2020. The stamps consist of paintings of marine life, birds, cacti and succulents, seashells, mammals and reptiles, insects, domestic pets and dogs. Two of these designs was reused in a miniature sheet in 2007 and an occasion card in 2013.

== Music ==
Micallef is a professional chromatic button accordion player, and he performs locally in Malta. He has also entertained audiences in other countries, including Italy, France, England, Ireland, Spain, Portugal, Germany, Hungary, Greece, Libya, the United States, Canada and Egypt.
