= Aħwa Maltin =

Conservative political party, also called the Maltese Brotherhood

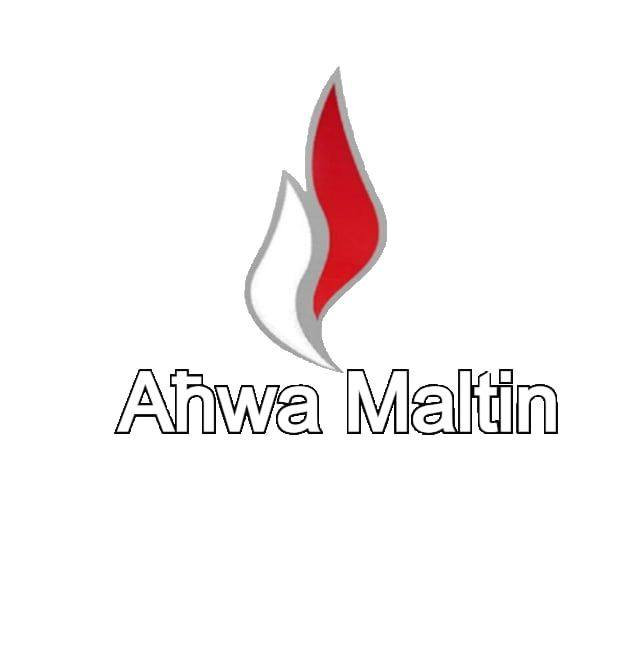
- Abbreviation: AM
- Leader: Paul Salomone
- President: Vacant
- General Secretary: Iris Vella
- Treasurer: Joseph Micallef
- Founded: August 2020
- Registered: 9 July 2020
- Dissolved: 6 October 2026
- Headquarters: Valley Road, Birkirkara
- Youth wing: Ġenerazzjoni Malta (defunct)
- Ideology: National conservatism; Hard euroscepticism; Anti-immigration; Direct-democracy (claimed); Gozo regionalism; Anti-abortion; Motorists' interests 2021–2022; Anti-lockdown politics Anti-EU Green Pass; Anti-vaccine activism
- Political position: Right-wing to far-right
- Religion: Roman Catholicism
- Colours: Red; White
- Slogan: Familja, Nazzjon, Libertà (Maltese: Family, Nation, Liberty)
- Parliament of Malta: 0 / 67
- European Parliament: 0 / 6
- Local Council Seats: 0 / 462

Website
- ahwamaltin.com

Aħwa Maltin (English: Brothers of Malta), previously called the People's Party (Maltese: Partit Popolari, PP), also called the Popular Party by Maltese English-language media, was a minor conservative political party in Malta. It was founded in July 2020 and was headed by Paul Salomone. The party never obtained any seats in local councils or the Maltese parliament, and did not contest European elections. It has been labelled right-wing to far-right in the media, however the party rejected this characterisation.

== History ==
The party, founded as the People's Party (Maltese: Partit Popolari) was registered in July 2020 and was launched later in November of the same year. In the party's first annual general meeting held on 4 August 2020, Paul Salomone, who had previously contested the 2008 election on the list of National Action, was confirmed leader of the party. In the 2022 general election, the first election the party participated in, contested with a total of 8 candidates in all 13 districts. They received 1,533 votes (0.53%) and did not elect any of their candidates, coming in second place amongst the third parties after ADPD and fourth nationwide.

The party shared no history or inspiration with the similarly-named People's Party of 1895 founded by Sigismondo Savona. The party also remembered Enrico Mizzi in the 72nd anniversary of his death.

In early 2025, the party updated their name to the Brothers of Malta, modelling themselves against the right-wing Brothers of Italy party.

In the 2026 general election, the party received 1845 first-count votes, coming in fifth out of all the parties.

In September 2026, the party leader Paul Salomone announced that the party would be dissolved, following low interest in volunteers and candidates.

== Ideology ==
Ideologically, Aħwa Maltin was a right-wing populist and conservative party. It opposed immigration, opposing "the abuse of the asylum system to facilitate economic migration". The party's founding document, entitled Il-Pilastri tal-Partit Popolari (English: The Founding Principles of the People's Party), described it as seeking the "wider use of the referendum", promoting the principle of subsidiarity locally and at the European level, supporting "the traditional family without prejudice to the rights of non-traditional families", and seeking to "represent Malta in Europe rather than Europe in Malta". The party combined traditional-conservative positions with Eurosceptic and anti-immigration stances.

The party stated that their policies were similar to those of the centre-right Nationalist Party until the 2000s, and did not accept being labeled as a far-right party. As recently as 2011, it was noted that the Nationalist Party's platform was still "far to the right of most other Christian Democratic parties, the Bavarian Christian Social Union in Germany included".

=== LGBTQ ===
The party strongly opposed LGBTQ rights in Malta. It proposed the preference of heterosexual couples over non-heterosexual couples in adoption, and campaigned for the removal of government funding for gender-affirming care for all ages and the raising of the minimum age to 21, despite the medical age of consent being 16 in Malta. The party criticised the Maltese government's strengthening of its gay conversion therapy ban on 13 January 2023, claiming that it tramples on individual liberty. On 7 February 2023 another Facebook post by the party claimed that they are against "Indoctrination of our children at school", in reference to an article by tabloid newspaper LovinMalta regarding new government policy aimed at making schools more inclusive.

=== COVID-19 politics ===
On the 16 January 2022 It organized anti-green pass protests. Furthermore, the party also protested against preventive measures against COVID-19, such as lockdowns and the distribution of vaccines.

=== Abortion ===
The party declared its total opposition to abortion with Salomone having stated that abortion is the killing of the innocent, and he declared that if the People's Party were elected, it would do everything in its power to save the life of the unborn. He also stated that he understood the situations of women who become pregnant unintentionally or suffer from mental or financial challenges, and therefore wants to support pregnant women throughout their pregnancy. Additionally, he promised that women who wished to have an abortion would be assisted in placing their children for adoption. Moreover, parents facing financial difficulties would be provided with social assistance.

=== Immigration ===
Aħwa Maltin – as did the former PP – advocated for a more restrictive immigration policy in Malta. The party opposed the government's reliance on foreign labour to sustain economic growth, arguing that the approach undermined Malta’s national identity and social cohesion. The party claimed that Malta was experiencing overdevelopment and cultural decline, with increased pressure on local workers due to an influx of cheap labor. Paul Salomone stated that he had nothing against foreigners, but believes that it should be focused stronger on their integration into Maltese society by learning the Maltese language and respecting local customs. The party also asserted that migration issues should be addressed at their origin, particularly in Africa, rather than being managed at the Mediterranean border. It questioned the classification of migrants who pay thousands of euros to reach Malta as economic migrants. In 2026, the party campaigned in favour of mass remigration.

=== Economy ===
The former party's president, Karmenu Borg, stated that Malta should follow the example of countries that have developed ecosystems of innovation, emphasizing the importance of promoting entrepreneurship, research, and development. The People's Party advocates for an economic model focused on high value-added activities rather than one reliant on low wages. Borg also noted that the party would seek to reform the social assistance system to eliminate incentives that may lead to misuse of public funds. In 2026, the party advocated for an economic model primarily based around motorsport, proposing the removal of all road taxes, reduction of VAT on taxi drivers, the completion of a racing track at Hal Far to serve as an educational institution for motorsport, the regular organising of classic car rallies and parades aimed at boosting tourism, and the construction of an offshore Formula One racetrack on an artificial island created by dumping domestic waste from the Maghtab landfill into the sea. The party claimed that this would generate billions of euros in income.

=== Direct democracy ===
The party advocated for enhanced direct democracy and increased citizen participation in governance. The party supports the use of referendums as a tool to ensure that the populace has a direct say in significant national decisions.

The party called for referendums on abortion, Gozitan regional autonomy and the European Union, emphasizing their commitment to allowing citizens to directly influence legislative decisions.

In its 2026 election manifesto, Aħwa Maltin has called for the direct election of regional governments in Malta and Gozo, the strengthening of local authorities including but not limited to increasing the maximum number of councillors in local councils and more powers related to councils' particular jurisdiction areas, an increase in financing local councils as long as it is proportional and the power to stop construction projects if residents oppose them. Finally they propose that the central or regional government compensate local councils for necessary works that would negatively impact the localities. All of these protections would be guaranteed by a constitutional amendment.

== Activity ==
The party was mainly active through press conferences and statements sent to national television. It also jointly participated in press conferences on cost of living and social values with Catholic social teaching-inspired think tank Moviment Solidarjetà (English: Solidarity Movement), led by former Nationalist MP Edwin Vassallo.

The party announced its dissolution on the 21st of September 2026 after being unable to find a single person willing to lead it.

== Gallery ==
People's Party Logo with Motto according to 2021 Statutes

People's Party Logo used from 2022 until 2025

== Election results ==
=== House of Representatives ===
Election	Leader	Votes	%	Seats	+/–	Rank	Status
2022	Paul Salomone	1,533	0.52	0 / 79	New	4th	Extra-parliamentary
2026	Paul Salomone	1,845	0.60	0 / 67	0	5th	Extra-parliamentary

=== Local Councils ===
Election	Leader	Votes	%	Seats	+/–	Rank
2024	Paul Salomone	227	0.09	0 / 471	New	5th
