= Church of St Bartholomew, Għargħur =

Parish Church of Saint Bartholomew
- Il-knisja Parrokkjali ta San Bartilmew
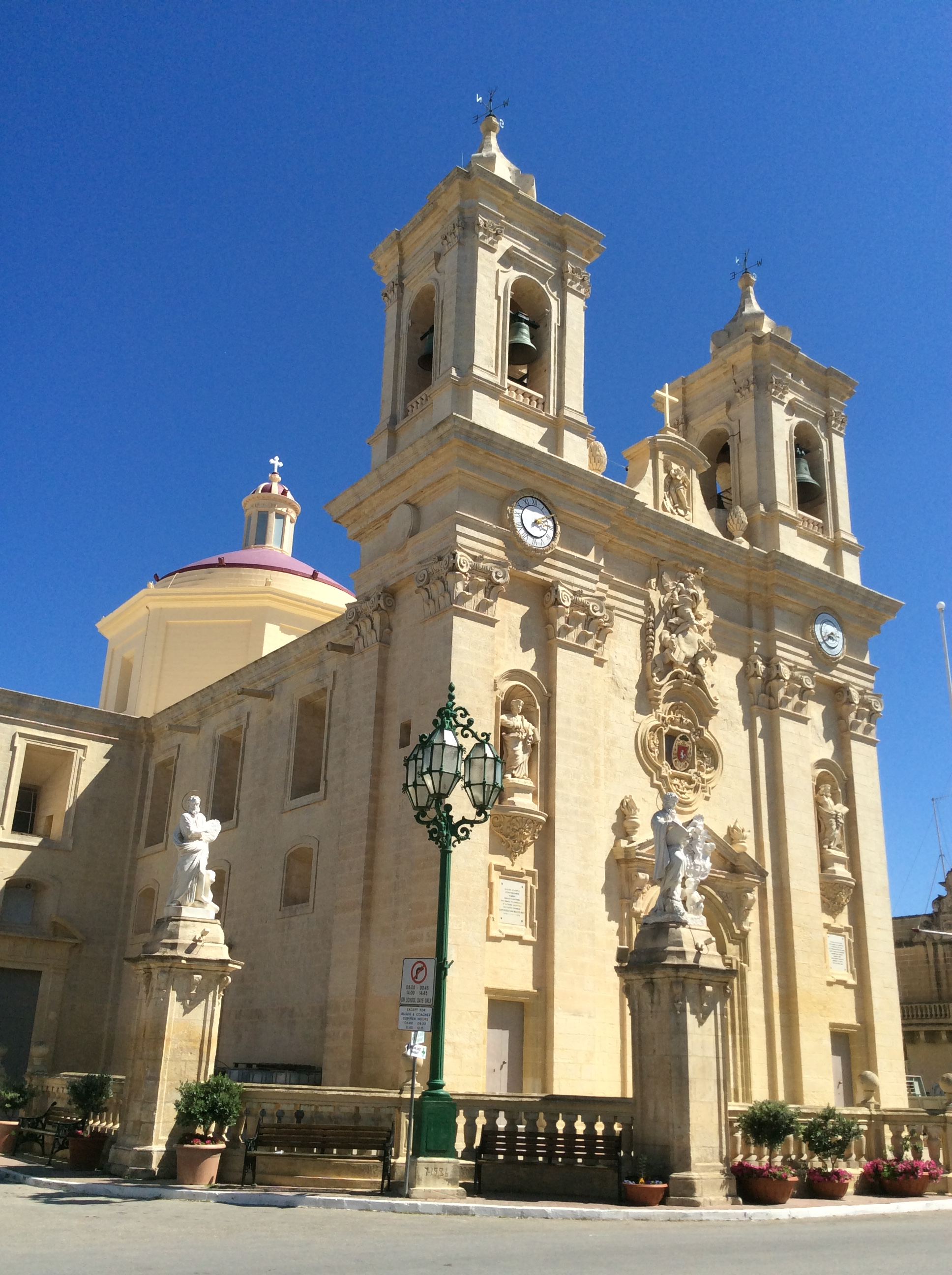
- The church in 2017
- Parish Church of Saint Bartholomew
- 35°55′25.8″N 14°27′12.6″E
- Location: Għargħur
- Country: Malta
- Denomination: Roman Catholic

History
- Status: Active
- Dedication: St Bartholomew
- Consecrated: 22 April 1736

Architecture
- Functional status: Parish church
- Architect: Tommaso Dingli
- Architectural type: Church
- Style: Doric (Interior); Baroque (exterior)

Specifications
- Width: 85 ft (26 m)
- Height: 115 ft (35 m)
- Materials: Limestone

Administration
- Archdiocese: Malta

Clergy
- Rector: Christopher Galea

The Church of St Bartholomew is a Roman Catholic Parish church in the village of Għargħur, Malta.

== History ==
The original chapel of St Bartholomew, which stood on the site of the present church, was documented by inquisitor Pietro Dusina on his apostolic visit to Malta in 1575. With the growing population of the village, the Bishop of Malta Tomás Gargallo created the new parish of Għargħur. Prior to this the village was part of the parish of Naxxar. Consequently, the parish priest of Naxxar refused to recognise this decision due to financial loss for the Naxxar parish and asked for the decision to create a new parish to be withdrawn. The bishop succumbed to the wishes of the parish priest of Naxxar, the elderly Julian Borg who died in 1610, which year the bishop re-established the parish of Għargħur with Reverend John Baptist Chetcuti as the first parish priest.

At first the people used the chapel of St John the Baptist as the parish church however as the population increased a new church was needed. The site of the chapel of St Bartholomew was chosen for the new church which commenced in 1610 on plans by Tommaso Dingli. The church has Doric and Baroque styles. The church was consecrated by Archbishop Paul Alphéran de Bussan on April 22, 1736. The facade of the church was built in 1743. It is built in a style different from that of the interior of the church. The old facade made by Dingli was quite different from the present one. It is slighting higher than the church roof and at the back of the frontispiece there are sculptured ornaments probably from the old church.

On February 13th 2026, a cross atop the Għargħur Parish Church was dislodged by heavy winds.

== Works of art ==
The painting behind the high altar, depicting the martyrdom of St Bartholomew, was painted by Giuseppe Calì in 1902. The painting replaced an older one, dating from the 17th century, by Emmanuel Perren, which was destroyed at the end of the last century. Other paintings in the quire depict the Last supper and the Nativity of Jesus, both the work of Francesco Zahra. Other work by Zahra include two of the side altars paintings.
