= Għarb First =

Localist political party in Malta

Għarb First Għarb l-Ewwel
- Abbreviation: GĦ1
- President: David Apap Agius
- Secretary: Miriam Borg
- Treasurer: Cecchini Shirley-Anne
- Founded: March 2019
- Split from: Nationalist Party
- Headquarters: 12B, Frenċ tal-Għarb Road, Għarb
- Ideology: Għarb localism
- Political position: Syncretic
- Religion: Roman Catholicism (de facto)
- Colors: Black
- Mayors of localities: 1 / 68
- Local council seats: 2 / 462

Għarb First (Maltese: Għarb l-Ewwel), is a localist party located in and operating only in Għarb, Gozo, in the Republic of Malta. It was founded by former PN Mayor David Apap Agius to contest the 2019 Maltese local elections. It gained 2 seats out of the 5 total seats in the Għarb Local Council, and 42.86% of the popular vote, narrowly losing the popular vote to PL by 1.95%, or 19 votes, making Għarb l-Ewwel the first third party to gain representation in the local level in both the Republic of Malta at-large and on the island of Gozo. This also makes Agius the first mayor of a village that comes from a third party. This was confirmed after a question on who the Mayorship of the Council was solved after the election.

== Values ==
The party has no known official ideologies, and acts akin to an Italian civic list, stating in its published party statute that it shall work and endeavour to protect in every legitimate way the interests of the people of Għarb, the wellbeing of Għarb and its community by contesting local council elections in the village.

Collaboration between the local Roman Catholic parish of the Visitation in Għarb and the local council has been seen throughout its work, through the erection of a statue of Sunta Apap near the one of Frenċ tal-Għarb, both people of saintly fame in Għarb. The party statute explicitly states that should the party dissolve, after all creditors are satisfied, any remaining assets shall be donated to said parish.

== Electoral history ==
=== Għarb Local Council ===
Election	Leader	Contested Seats	Votes	%	Elected Seats	+/− Share	+/- Seats	Rank
2019	David Apap Agius	3 / 5	417	42.86	2 / 5	New		2nd
2024	David Apap Agius	3 / 5	591	56.29	2 / 5	+13.43%	Steady	▲1st
