= Għargħur =

Għargħur Ħal Għargħur Gargur, Gregorio
- Local council
- Casal Gregorio
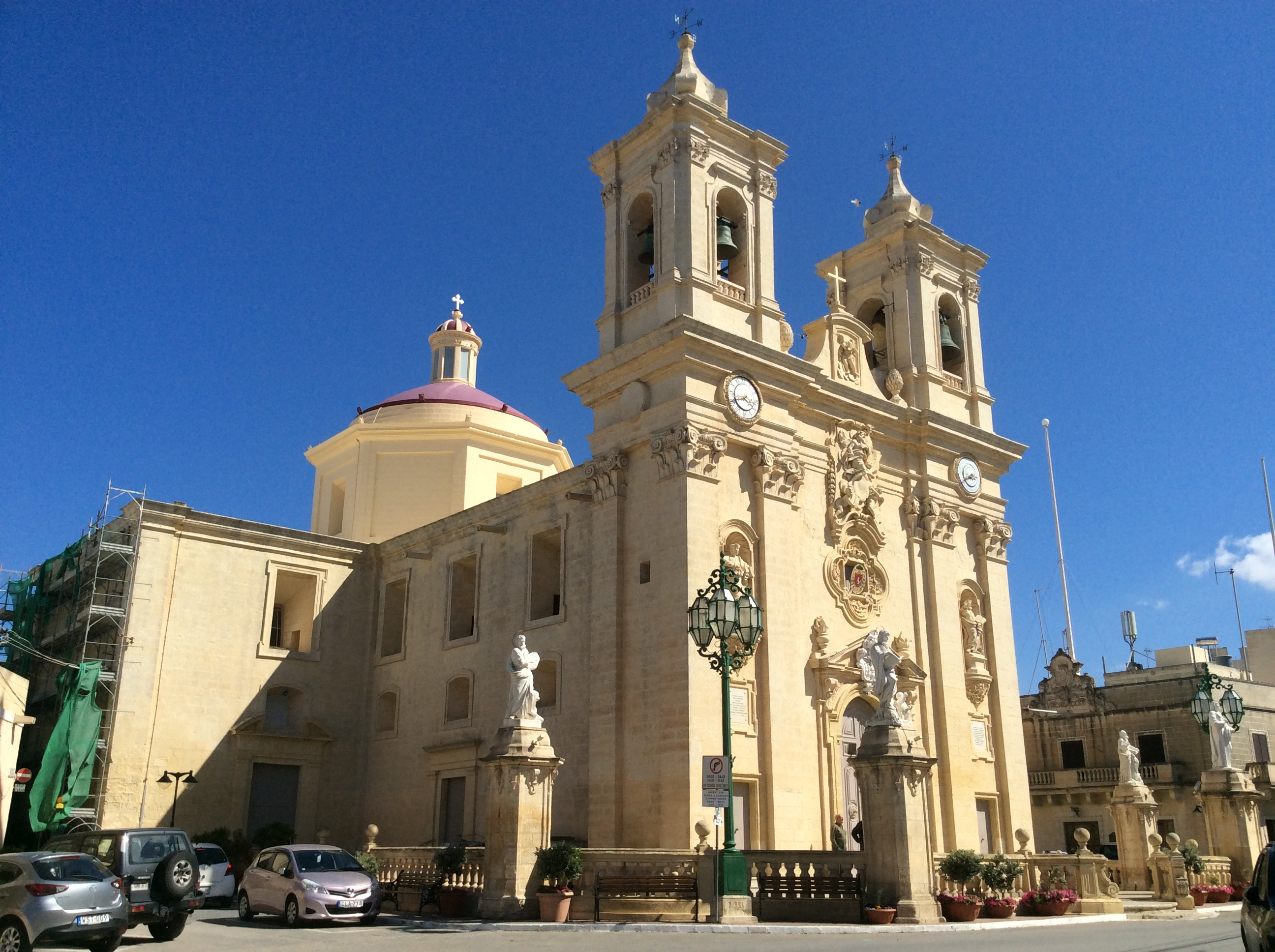
- Church of St Bartholomew, Għargħur

- Flag Coat of arms
- Motto(s): Excelsior (Higher)
- Coordinates: 35°55′26.65″N 14°27′12.14″E
- Country: Malta
- Region: Eastern Region
- District: Northern District
- Borders: Iklin, Naxxar, San Ġwann, Swieqi

Government
  - Mayor: Mariah Meli (PL)

Area
  - Total: 2 km^{2} (0.77 sq mi)

Population (Jul. 2024)
  - Total: 4,172
  - Density: 2,100/km^{2} (5,400/sq mi)
- Demonym(s): Għargħuri (m), Għargħurija (f), Għargħurin (pl)
- Time zone: UTC+1 (CET)
  - Summer (DST): UTC+2 (CEST)
- Postal code: GHR
- Dialing code: 356
- ISO 3166 code: MT-15
- Patron saint: St. Bartholomew
- Day of festa: 24 August or last Sunday of August
- Website: gharghurlc.gov.mt

Għargħur (Maltese: Ħal Għargħur) is a village in the Eastern Region of Malta. It is situated on a hilltop between two valleys. The population of Għargħur was 4,172 in July 2024. This included 2,125 males and 2,047 females; 3,329 Maltese nationals and 843 foreign nationals.

== Għargħur Festa ==
In Malta, each village celebrates a different patron saint or two depending on the number of churches in the locality. Each church is dedicated to a different saint. For this reason, some villages celebrate more than one "festa" per year. The village band clubs, at times in collaboration with the members of the parish, are tasked with the organisation of the "festa". The competition between the band clubs can be quite fierce when it comes to the organisation of decorations and the fireworks shows, even if there is only one "festa" in the village. It gets even tougher when the locality celebrates two different patron saints, each honoured by an individual band club. The "festi" are held over the summer months. This is a time of great merrymaking for the local community. In fact, there are a lot of traditions and customs associated with the "festa". Attending the "festa" can be a bit of a culture shock as it can get really noisy and loud. The Għargħur Festa is on 24 August or the last Sunday of August. For a whole week, Għargħur enjoys a celebratory festive mood, as it is wholly decorated in colourful lights, statues and other street decorations. The brass band marches take place throughout the evenings on the days prior to the "festa", accompanied by spectacular fireworks, together with the nougat and ice cream stalls distributed around the village. On the day of the feast of St. Bartholomew, there is a procession around Għargħur with the titular statue of the saint followed by brass bands and a crowd of devout ones.

== Coat-of-arms and motto ==
Its coat of arms is divided per chevron, silver and red, with a red star on the silver part. The motto is 'Excelsior' meaning "higher". The motto tells that the town is on the highest hill in Malta. In the Maltese dictionary Lexicon, of 1796, Vassalli gives a description of Għargħur in Italian as "Bel Villaggio alla parte settentrionale di Malta" ("A pretty village in the northern part of Malta").

== Etymology ==
In modern times a controversy has risen over the real name of this village - whether it should be called Gargur or Ħal Għargħur. The original name was Ħal Għargħur (pronounced har arauwr or hal arauwr). 'Ħal' is an old abbreviation of 'Raħal', which means a "village/small town". In the middle of the 15th century the village was called Casal Gregorio although the Maltese equivalent of the name Gregorio is Girgor, not Għargħur. Rahal in classical Arabic is village or settlement, while Ghargur is arawr in Arabic derived from Ar'ar which is Gharghar tree or the sictus tree.

== History ==
Some Roman artifacts, found during road construction, were carried to the Domvs Romana, a Roman Villa and Museum, situated in the old city of Mdina. A Muslim-style oven is still found in a house in Sqaq Warda, and a home with Arab-style decorations on the façade exists in the same area. There is documented reference of Ħal Għargħur as far back as 1419, in the lists of the Dejma, which was a Militia that guarded the locals from pirate attacks. The settlement suffered from severe de-population during the High Middle Ages and some years later due to continuous pirate attacks. Exiles from the central Italian city of Celano settled in Ħal Għargħur and built the town's oldest church, that of St. John (next to which one finds the town's graveyard). The citizens of Celano were exiled in the year 1223 by Emperor Frederick II.

The main event of the year is the village festa which is celebrated on the 24th (if this turns out to be a Sunday) or the last Sunday of August. The statue of the saint is carried shoulder high along the illuminated streets of the village accompanied by musical bands. A display of colourful fireworks, ends the village festival. Many tourists tend to take part in the celebration of the saint's day, by visiting the church and the well-known fireworks display.

=== Prior the establishment of a parish ===
There is little written information about the people of Għargħur in earlier days. One source of information is the Dejma list, which mentions Għargħur in conjunction with Ħal Samudi (Madliena). In the Middle Ages, Għargħur was most probably a very small rural community. An abbey was established in Ħal Għargħur in the Middle Ages, in an area now called Tar-Rħieb (Friars' (old Maltese) place). There is no evidence as to when and why this abbey was abandoned, but the reason could have been the constant pirate attacks on the village, which led to a severe depopulation of both Għargħur and nearby settlements. During these raids, settlements were looted and those considered valuable enough were taken into slavery. Indeed, in this period houses in Għargħur were built so as to allow the residents to lock themselves in. One feature of these houses was a secret room in which females used to hide during these attacks. Also, the old streets and alleys are planned in a way that would confuse visitors. These raids continued well into the years, even after Għargħur became a parish. Indeed, on one occasion the residents of Għargħur found refuge in the parish church and vowed that if they were unharmed, there would be an annual pilgrimage to the shrine of [Mellieħa]. Nobody was harmed or taken into slavery on that occasion, and thus the tradition of holding this pilgrimage was started.

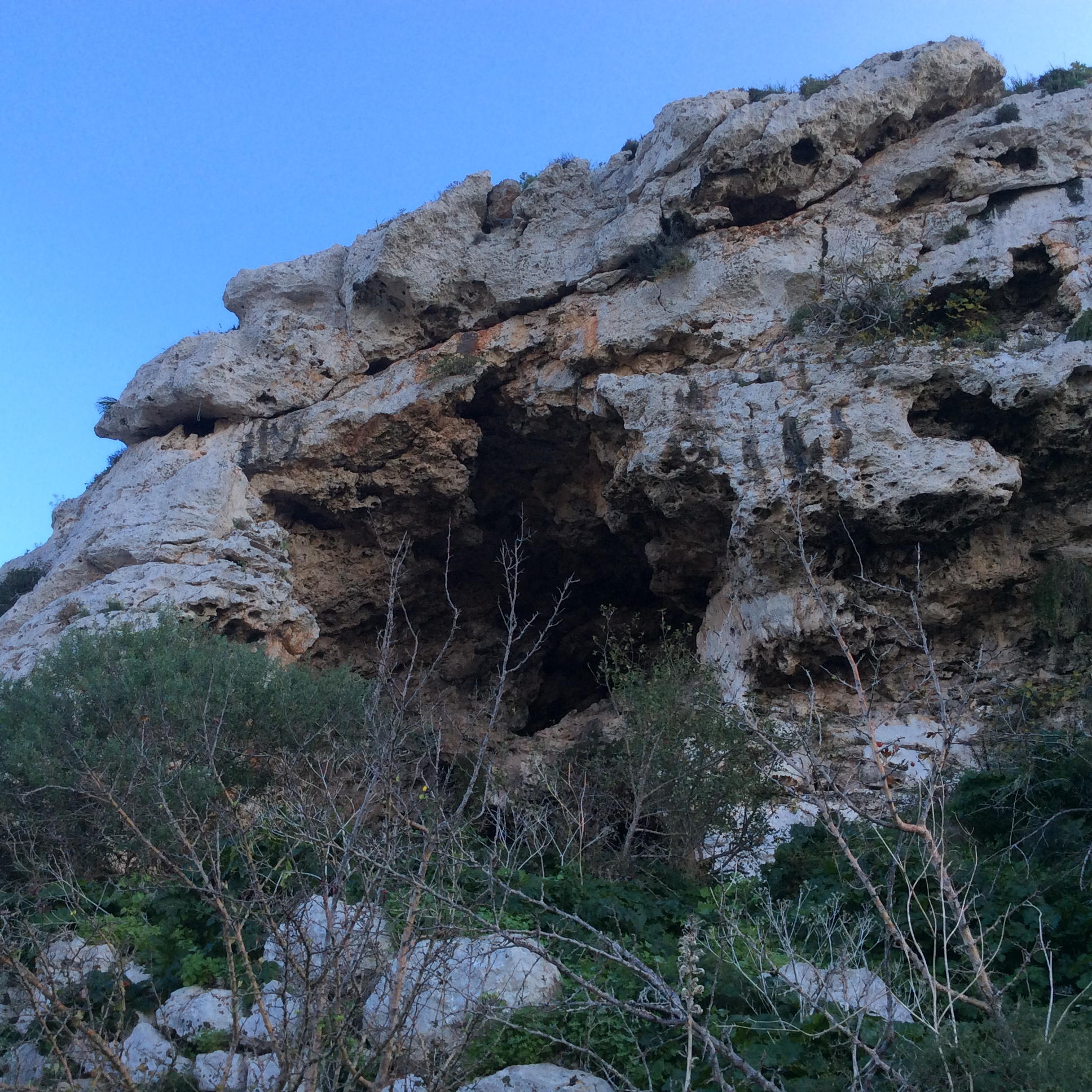
Gharghur main cave

As regards places of worship, it is likely that the early Christians used some of the caves found in the village as churches. Two such caves are those found at Ġebel San Pietru (Saint Peter's Hill (Old Maltese) or Stone (Modern Maltese)) and Għar San Brinkat (Saint Patrick's cave). Later on chapels were built. St. John the Baptist's chapel is considered to be the first chapel built in Għargħur, even though it was rebuilt in the 17th century and the existing chapel is not the medieval original. Another two medieval chapels were those of St Nicholas and St Bartholomew in the village of Għargħur; those of St Catherine and St Gregory (both in Xwieki); and St Mary Magdalene (Madliena) in the surrounding countryside.

=== Ħal Għargħur becomes a Parish - 1598, 1610 ===
Prior to 1598, Ħal Għargħur was part of the Naxxar parish. However, in 1598 Bishop Gargallo (for whom one finds a street named in Ħal Għargħur) decided to grant the people of Ħal Għargħur the charter establishing a parish. Thus, the first baptisms, marriages and funerals started being done in Ħal Għargħur. Dun Mattew Schiriha from Senglea, responsible for the chapel of Saint Bartholomew (which existed on the site of the present parish church), started signing documents as "Cappellano della parrochia di Casal Gregorio".

The Naxxar parish refused to accept the new status of Ħal Għargħur. Dun Giljan Borg, parish priest of Naxxar, complained about the financial loss that Naxxar would suffer with the separation from it of Ħal Għargħur and stated that the Naxxar parish was losing the authority it had over the Ħal Għargħur community. Although Ħal Għargħur and Mosta formed part of the Naxxar parish, both were regarded as being separate entities from Naxxar; on the birth registers of Naxxar, at the time when the two villages fell under Naxxar, it was written next to the person's name whether he was from Naxxar, Mosta or Ħal Għargħur.

The new status of Ħal Għargħur was suspended in 1601 by the Bishop's curia. This was done because Borg's health was deteriorating due to this problem. The Ħal Għargħur community complained about the situation to the Inquisitor, Monsigneur Verallo, who decided in 1604 that Saint Bartholomew's church could be used again as a parish church, despite the fact that officially it had been re-integrated into Naxxar. With the death of Rev. Borg in 1610, Bishop Gargallo felt that he could finally confirm Ħal Għargħur's status as a separate parish. The residents of Ħal Għargħur, most of whom were farmers, promised that they would give part of their produce (cotton, wheat and barley) for the preservation of the parish.

Ħal Għargħur was a rural community located in an area particularly lacking fertile soil and fresh water. Nevertheless, the inhabitants of this area were able to finance the building of a parish church and several other chapels which host Baroque fine arts. The main attraction of the village, besides the countryside, is the Church of St Bartholomew. Its interior is of the Doric order but it has a fine Baroque façade. The original façade was demolished and the one seen today was built in 1743. The church was built between 1610 and 1638 and was designed by Maltese architect Tumas Dingli.

Its treasures include a wooden statue of Saint Bartholomew sculptured in Rome attributed to Maltese artist Melchiorre Cafà. The statue was made circa 1666 and it is believed to be the model for the similar statue in San Giovanni Laterano, Rome. It was brought to the town in 1772. Restorations on it were held in 1912. In 2005 the statue had further preservation and its niche was restructured. The statue is the second heaviest in the Maltese islands.

=== British period ===
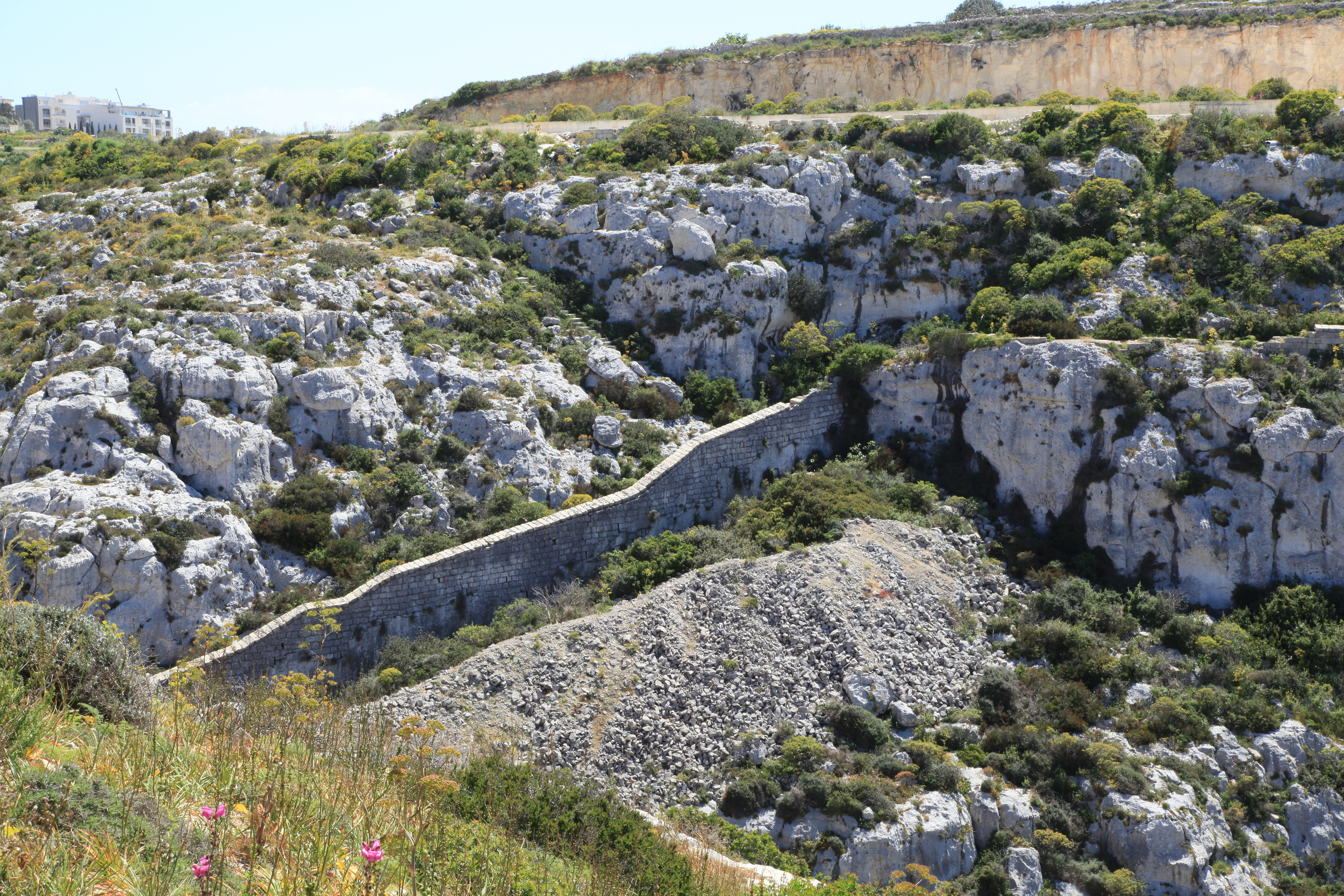
Victoria Lines in Għargħur

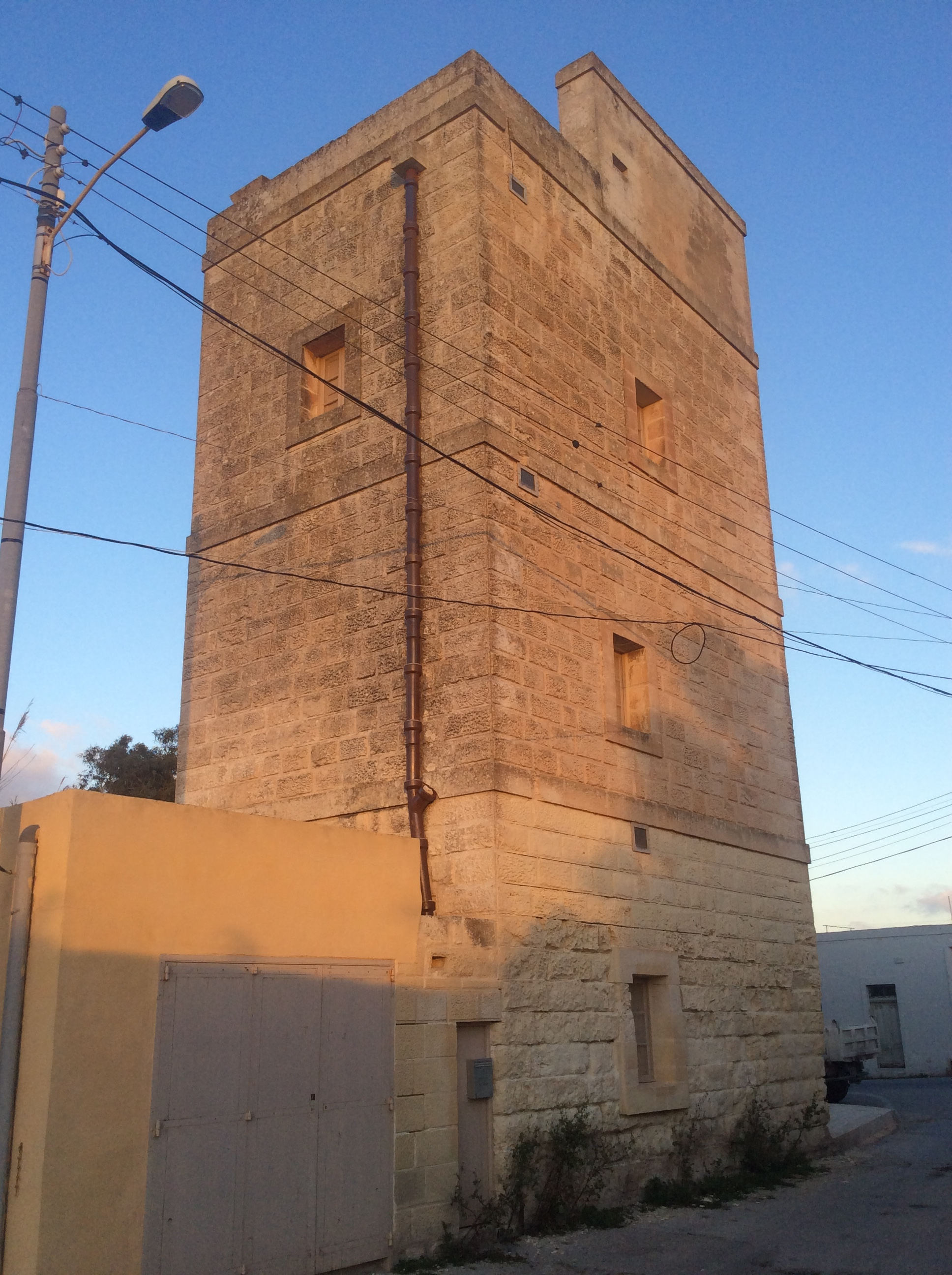
The Għargħur Semaphore Tower was built in 1848

The Victoria Lines, named after Queen Victoria, and which divide the island of Malta from east to west, pass through this locality. There are also other fortifications. Għargħur hosts much of Malta's telecommunication infrastructure.

Before World War II and prior to the installation of radar, a concave wall was constructed in Ħal Għargħur with the aim of detecting incoming aircraft. This acoustic mirror is called "il-Widna" by locals (lit. "the ear").

Ħal Għargħur hosted a number a refugees from the harbour area during that war who were seeking shelter from the continuous air raids by the Axis powers. The public school was used as a dormitory for these refugees.

== Dialect ==
Traditionally, the people of Għargħur spoke in their own dialect. This dialect, like others on the island of Malta, is highly endangered. This is mainly due to the influence of the media, in which the dialect of the harbour area is used, and an education system which discourages the use of dialects. A socio-cultural stigma associated with dialects also contributed to the gradual demise of the dialect. As older generations stopped talking to their children in dialect, the dialect started dying out.

There are various features associated with this dialect. One of them is the pronunciation of the letter "Q" in certain words, namely "daħq", "ċagħaq", "qagħaq" and "sriedaq", as a voiceless uvular plosive (similar to a "k"). In standard Maltese, the Q is pronounced as a glottal stop. Another feature, which however now has largely disappeared, is the pronunciation of the "h", which is otherwise silent in Maltese. Another feature is an untrilled "R", a letter which is normally trilled in standard Maltese. A word which is associated with this dialect is "ħuuri", which means "look". In the Ħal Għargħur dialect, a kite is called "ħamiema (ħemiema)" (pigeon), while in standard Maltese it is called tajra. The traditional Maltese female garb, the għonnella, was called stamijna in the Għargħur dialect. The silent h ("akka") in Maltese was previously spoken in this dialect, and it still is by a few elder members of the community.

Some words that in Standard Maltese are homophones are not homophones in the Għargħur dialect. Two such words are ħajt and dar. Ħajt (thread) is pronounced as ħajt while ħajt (wall) is pronounced as ħæjt. Dar (home) is pronounced as dôr while dar (he turned around) is pronounced as dor.

Th interjection "ħûri" is commonly used in this dialect, where "ħares" or "ara" would be used in Standard Maltese.

The following are some words as spoken in the Għargħur dialect:

| Standard Maltese | Għargħuri | English |
|---|---|---|
| ħobża | ħubża | loaf of bread |
| mara | mâra | woman |
| lapes | lûpis | pencil |
| ommi | ummej | my mother |
| qanfud | qenfiwd | hedgehog |
| siġġu | siġġiw | chair |
| kelb | kælb | dog |
| bieb | beb | door |
| mus | miws | pocket knife |
| knisja | kniesjæ | church |
| qagħaq | kegħek | (sweet) rings |
| beritta | birittæ | cap |

== Legends ==
One of the legends found in Għargħur is that of St. Patrick's Cave (Għar San Brinkat). It was believed, in the old times, that demons had infested this cave. Thus, people were afraid to pass by it. Once, a painting on wood that featured a crucified Christ and St. Patrick came ashore in Baħar iċ-Ċagħaq. Promptly, the people of Baħar iċ-Ċagħaq took the painting to this cave and the demons left. A spring found in this cave was said to be miraculous; however, the faithful stopped drinking from it after lepers started bathing in it in order to heal. The painting can still be seen in the cave, a mass is said here once a year, when a small feast is held.

== Performing arts ==
Għargħur is the home of the Dwal Ġodda Theatre Company, whose aim is to present Maltese theatre in its cultural setting. Dwal Ġodda's repertoire includes works of members of the group, mainly the prolific playwright Martin Gauci, as well as classic plays by international dramatists and work by living writers.

== Motto ==
The village's motto is Excelsior, which also used in the coat of arms of the US state of New York.

== Places of interest ==
- Oratory (at Oratory Street)
- Santa Marija ta' Żellieqa Chapel (at Madliena Road)
- St. Bartholomew's Parish Church (at Church Square)
- St. John's Chapel (at St. John Street)
- St. Nicholas' Chapel (at St. Nicholas Street)
- Tal-Ferħa Home
- Wied id-Dis
- Wied Anġlu (at Bishop Gargallo Street)
- Għar San Brinkat
- Top of The World (Hiking Passage)

=== Parks and recreation ===
Ġnien Il-Paċi (Garden Of Peace) is located on San Nikola Road Għargħur. It is a small public garden and it was created to provide a quiet green space for residents and tourists to relax and enjoy nature. In 2021 it was restored to improve its appearance. Murals on walls, a gym and modernized playground facilities were added.

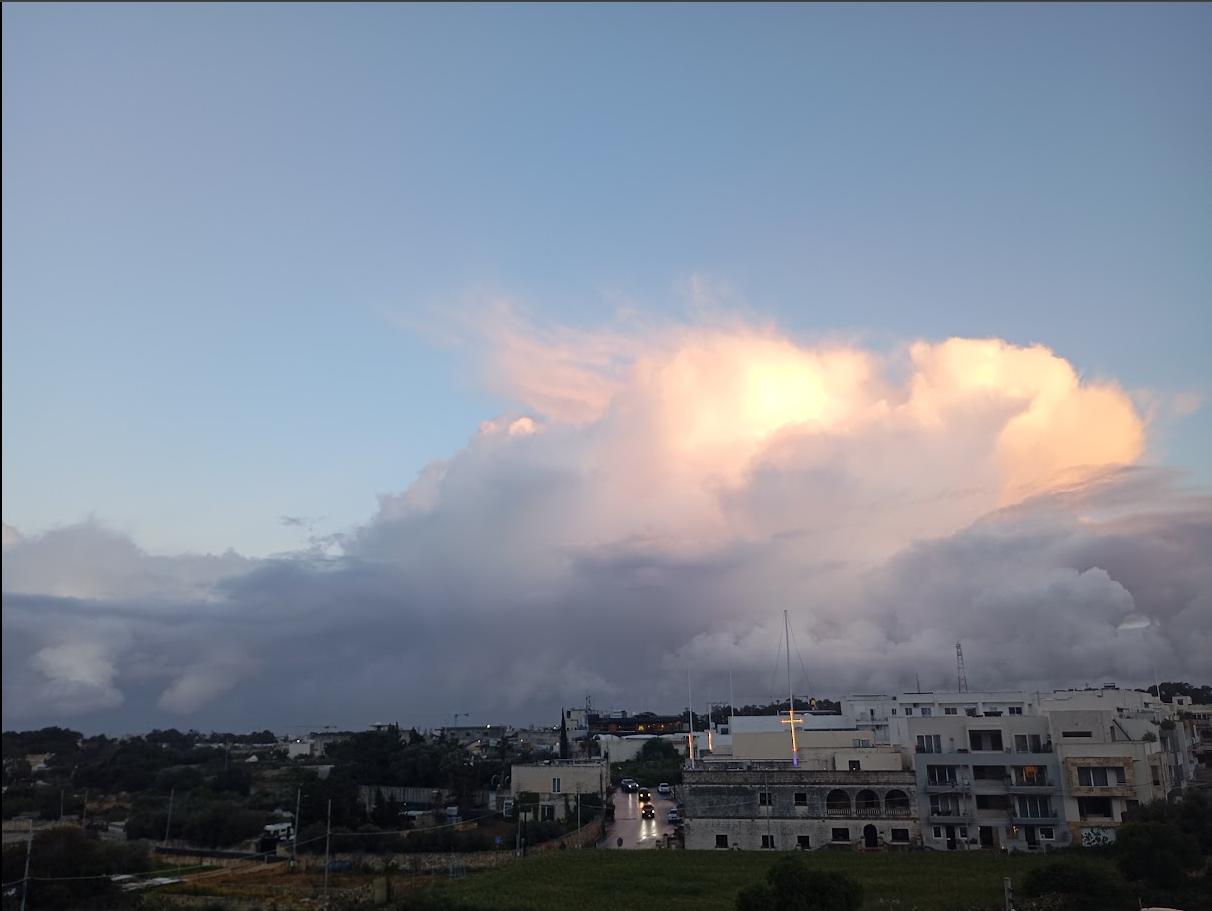
Gharghur Xwieki Area

=== Old village core ===
- Misraħ il-Knisja (Church Square)
- Sqaq Warda (Rose Alley)
- Sqaq ir-Rużarju (Rosary Lane)
- Triq Emmanuel Perren (E. Perren Street)
- Triq id-Dejqa (Strait Street)
- Triq il-Kbira (Main Street)(formerly Strada Reale ~ Kingsway)
- Triq il-Ġdida (New Street)
- Triq il-Qiegħed
- Sqaq iċ-Ċawl (Ravens' Lane)
- Triq Mons. Luigi Catania (Mgr. L. Catania Street)(formerly Strada Britannica ~ British Street)
- Triq il-Wiesgħa (Wide Street)
- Triq id-Dejqa (Strait Street)
- Triq Karmnu Zarb (Carmelo Zarb Street)(formerly Sqaq l-Erwieħ ~ Souls' Alley)
- Triq id-Dejma (Dejma (local militia) Street)
- Sqaq Charlotte (Charlotte Alley)
- Sqaq Sofija (Sophia Alley)
- Triq San Ġorġ (St. George Street)
- Triq Fidiel Zarb (Fidelio Zarb Street)
- Triq il-Ġnien (Garden Street)
- Triq Ferdinand (Ferdinand Street)
- Triq San Bartilmew (St. Bartholomew Street)
- Triq San Nikola (St. Nicholas Street)

== Notable people ==
- Andrew Micallef, painter and musician – lives in Għargħur
