= Sannat =

Sannat Ta' Sannat
- Local council
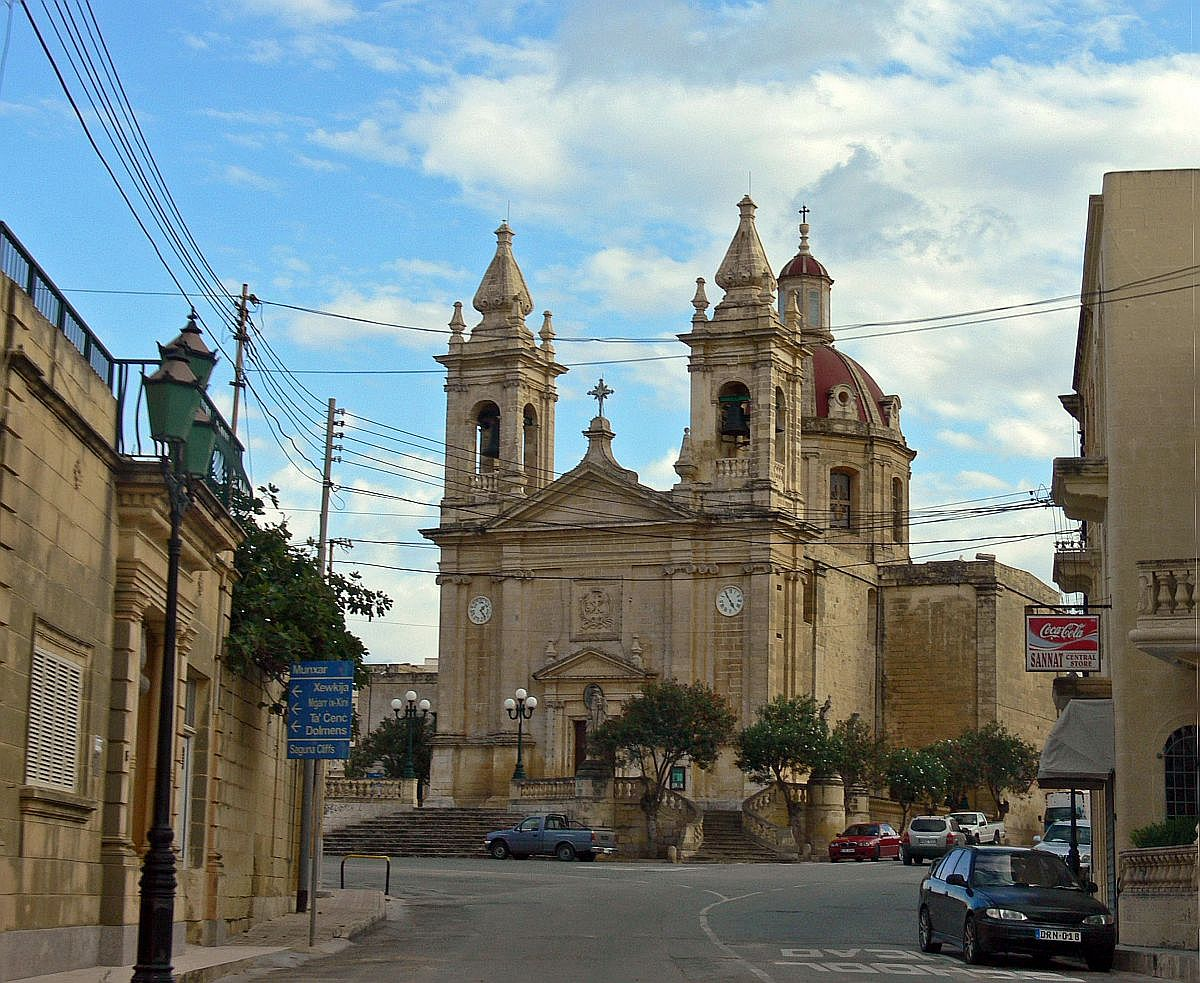
- Sannat parish church

- Flag Coat of arms

- Coordinates: 36°1′28″N 14°14′45″E
- Country: Malta
- Region: Gozo Region
- District: Gozo and Comino District
- Borders: Għajnsielem, Munxar, Xewkija

Government
  - Mayor: Vella Philip (PL)

Area
  - Total: 3.8 km^{2} (1.5 sq mi)

Population (July 2024)
  - Total: 2,265
  - Density: 600/km^{2} (1,500/sq mi)
- Demonym(s): Sannati (m), Sannatija (f), Sannatin (pl)
- Time zone: UTC+1 (CET)
  - Summer (DST): UTC+2 (CEST)
- Postal code: SNT
- Dialing code: 356
- ISO 3166 code: MT-52
- Patron saint: St. Margaret
- Website: Official website

Sannat (Maltese: Ta' Sannat) is an administrative unit of Malta, on the island of Gozo. The population of Sannat was 2,265 in July 2024. This included 1,178 males and 1,087 females; 1,951 Maltese nationals and 314 foreign nationals.

Ta' Sannat is in the south of Gozo, popular for its very high cliffs, ancient cart ruts, temples and dolmens, and rich fauna and flora. In 1951 The Duchess of Edinburgh (who became Queen Elizabeth II) of the United Kingdom visited a house called "The Lace house" located in a small square in Ta' Sannat called "Pjazza Tax-Xelina".

== Zones in Sannat ==
- Iċ-Ċnus
- Il-Ħofra
- Inni Wara
- Mġarr ix-Xini
- Ta' Bardan
- Ta' Ċenċ
- Ta' Ċenċ Cliffs
- Ta' Dun Nastas
- Ta' Durell
- Ta' Marżiena
- Ta' Randu
- Ta' Seguna
- Ta' Żabbetta
- Tax-Xamgħan

== Local Council ==
The current local council members are:

- Vella Philip - Mayor

== Ta' Sannat Main Roads ==
- Pjazza Santa Margarita (St. Margret Square)
- Pjazza Tax-Xelina
- Triq Dun Xand Aquilina
- Triq il-Kbira (Main Street)
- Triq ix-Xewkija (Xewkija Road)
- Triq Marziena (Marziena Street)
- Triq Santa Marija (St Mary Street)
- Triq Ta' Ċenċ (Ta' Cenc Road)
- Triq Ta' Sannat (Ta' Sannat Road)
- Triq Tal-Gruwa (Tal-Gruwa Road)

=== Other Streets at Ta' Sannat ===
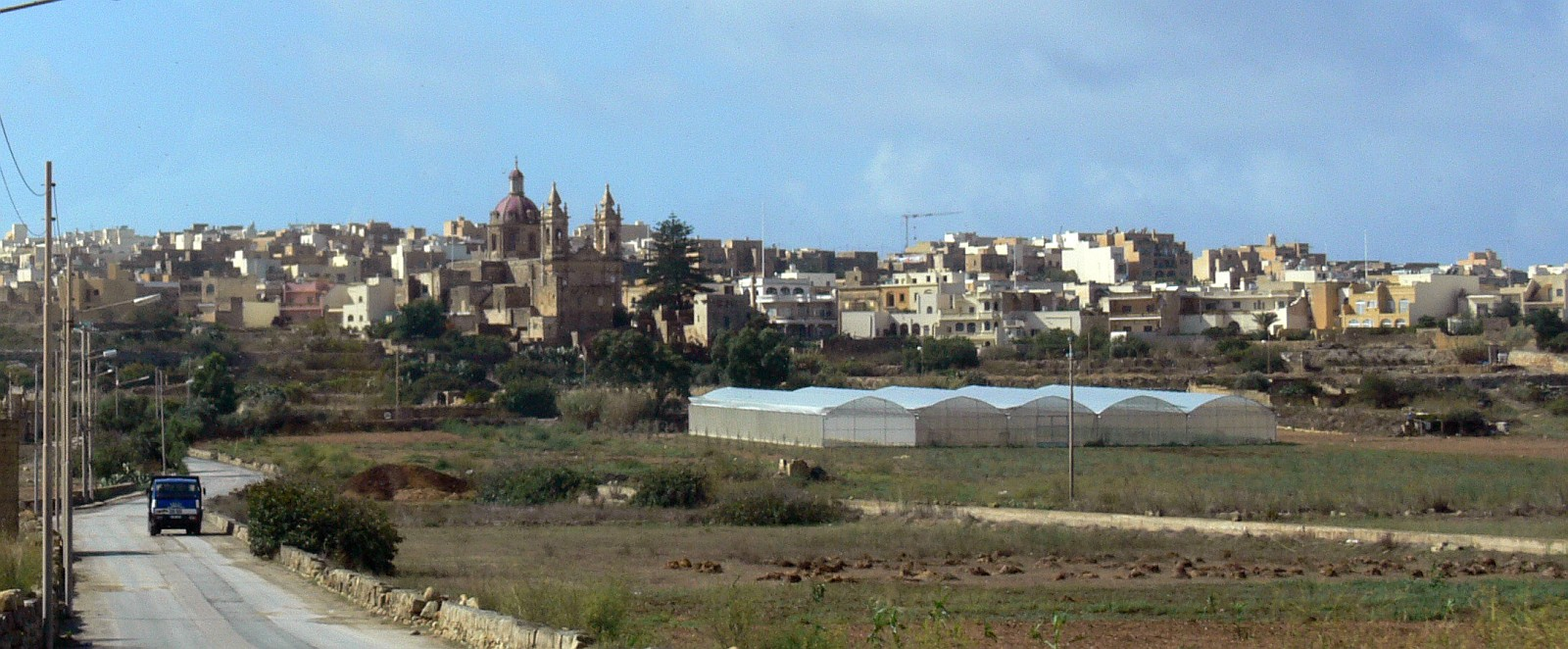
Sannat

- Daħla Ċnus (Cnus Lane)
- Sqaq Ta' Xamgħan (Xamghan Alley)
- Triq Daħla taċ-Ċnus (Dahla Tac-Cnus Road)
- Triq Dun Lazzru Camilleri (Fr. Lazzarus Camilleri Street)
- Triq Dun Xand Aquilina (Fr. Alexander Aquilina Street)
- Triq Ta' Gerxija (Gerxija Street)
- Triq il-Blat (Rocks Street)
- Triq il-Falkun (Falcon Street)
- Triq il-Ħarruba (Carob Street)
- Triq il-Kalati (Kalati Street)
- Triq il-Kalkara tal-Ġir (Klin Street)
- Triq il-Misraħ (Square Street)
- Triq il-Pinnur (Wind Direction Street)
- Triq it-28 ta' April, 1688 (28 April 1688 Street)
- Triq it-Tempju tal-Imramma (Mramma Temple Street)
- Triq it-Tilliera (Tilliera Street)
- Triq it-Tin (Fig Street)
- Triq ix-Xabbata (Climber Street)
- Triq ix-Xabbata Gdida
- Triq l-10 ta' Ottubru 1942 (10 October 1942 Street)
- Triq l-Ikbiex (Ikbiex Street)
- Triq l-Isqof D.Cocco Palmier (Bishop Cocco Palmier Street)
- Triq Marsilja (Marsilia Street)
- Triq Palazz Palina (Palina Palace Street)
- Triq Paranji (Paranji Street)
- Triq Ras in-Newwiela (Ras in-Newwiela Street)
- Triq Skerla (Skerla Street)
- Triq Ta' Bebunaq (Bebunaq Road)
- Triq Ta' Dun Luqa (Dun Luqa Road)
- Triq Ta' Durell (Durell Street)
- Triq Ta' Saguna (Saguna Road)
- Triq Ta' Xamgħan (Xamghan Road)
- Triq Ta' Zabbetta (Zabbetta Road)
- Triq Tal-Lewż (Almond Street)
- Triq Vinċenzo Caruana Spiteri (Vincent Caruana Spiteri Street)

== Twin towns – sister cities ==
Sannat is twinned with:

- Pisoniano, Italy
- Montefiascone, Italy
