= Munxar =

Munxar Il-Munxarin
- Local council
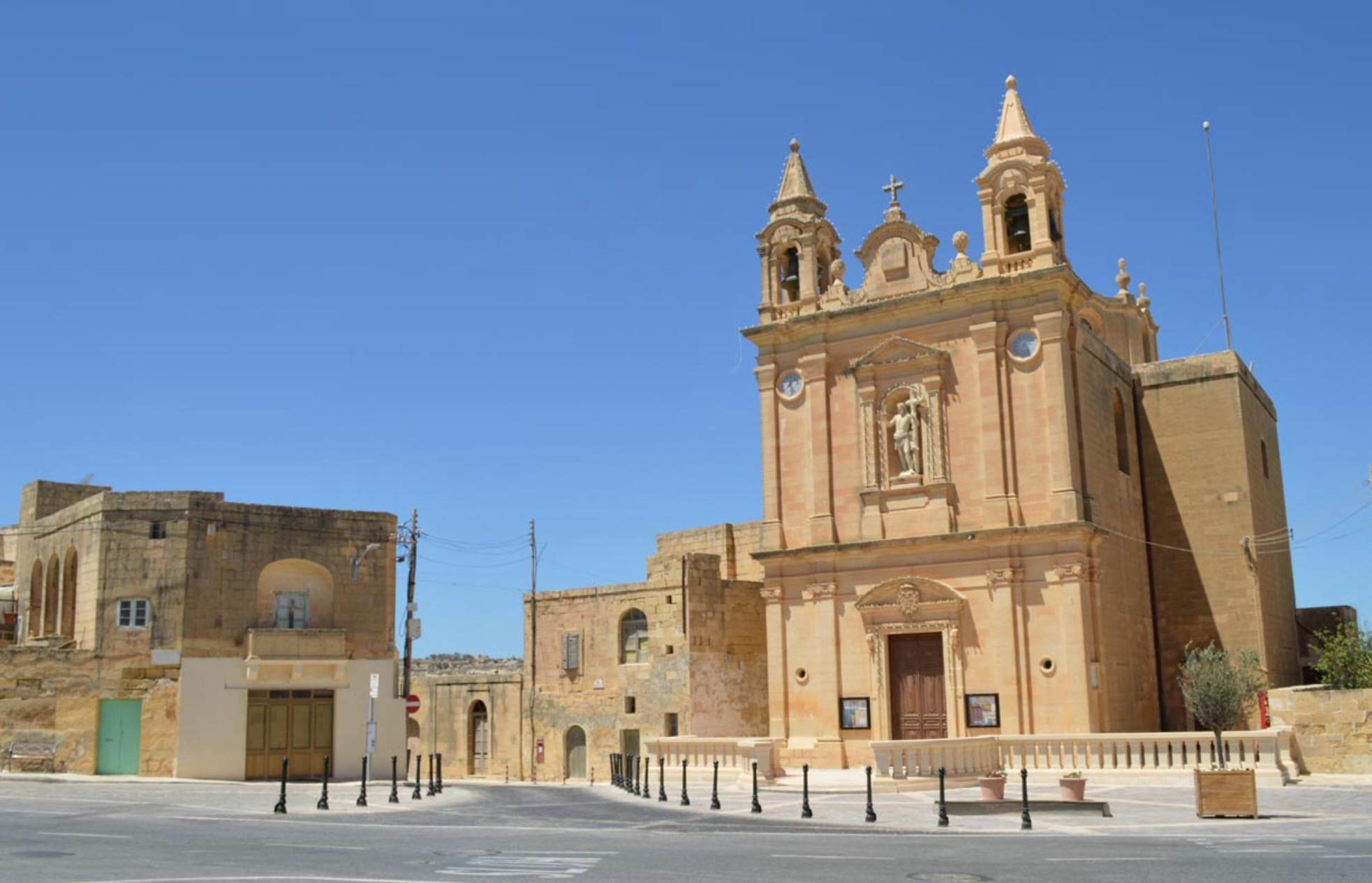
- View of Munxar parish church and surroundings

- Flag Coat of arms

- Coordinates: 36°1′49″N 14°14′7″E
- Country: Malta
- Region: Gozo Region
- District: Gozo and Comino District
- Borders: Fontana, Kerċem, Sannat, Xewkija

Government
  - Mayor: Damien Spiteri (PN)

Area
  - Total: 2.8 km^{2} (1.1 sq mi)

Population (July 2024)
  - Total: 1,872
  - Density: 670/km^{2} (1,700/sq mi)
- Demonym(s): Munxari (m), Munxarija (f), Munxarin (pl)
- Time zone: UTC+1 (CET)
  - Summer (DST): UTC+2 (CEST)
- Postal code: MXR
- Dialing code: 356
- ISO 3166 code: MT-36
- Patron saint: St. Paul
- Website: Official website

Munxar (Maltese: Il-Munxar) is an administrative unit of Malta, which lies on the southern side of the island of Gozo. The population of Munxar was 1,872 in July 2024. This included 1,002 males and 870 females; 1,098 Maltese nationals and 774 foreign nationals.

Close to this village, there is Xlendi Bay, a popular tourist resort engulfed in a fjord-like inlet amongst high cliffs. Xlendi Bay is a small fishing village, but is also an ideal bathing and diving resort especially in summer. Otherwise, foreigners and locals enjoy the late spring and early autumn sunsets often captured by artists or keen photographers.

The parish church, a small baroque building built from the typical Maltese stone, is dedicated to St. Paul. It was built between 1914 and 1925 and was consecrated on 18 October 1925. Bishop Giuseppe Pace established it as a parish church on 12 December 1957. As a result, Munxar was the last village in Gozo to become an autonomous parish. The feast officially falls on 10 February which is also a national public holiday; however, the outside festivities are celebrated on the third Sunday of each May.

One of the people of note to have been born and lived in this village is Professor Joseph Aquilina.

== History ==
The first records that were found recording Munxar as an area dates back to the sixteenth century when the area was named Monxiar, which means a bucksaw, taking its name from the two valleys running parallel from the village. From a sixteenth-century census, the village had a population of around 200 inhabitants. The first surnames recorded in the census were Attard, Barberi, Hagius, among a few others which suggests that these were the first Munxarin. In that time, Monxiar and Xlendi were part of the village of Sannat. At the time, the population of Xlendi was only 8 persons – the tower guardian and his family who lived in Xlendi tower.

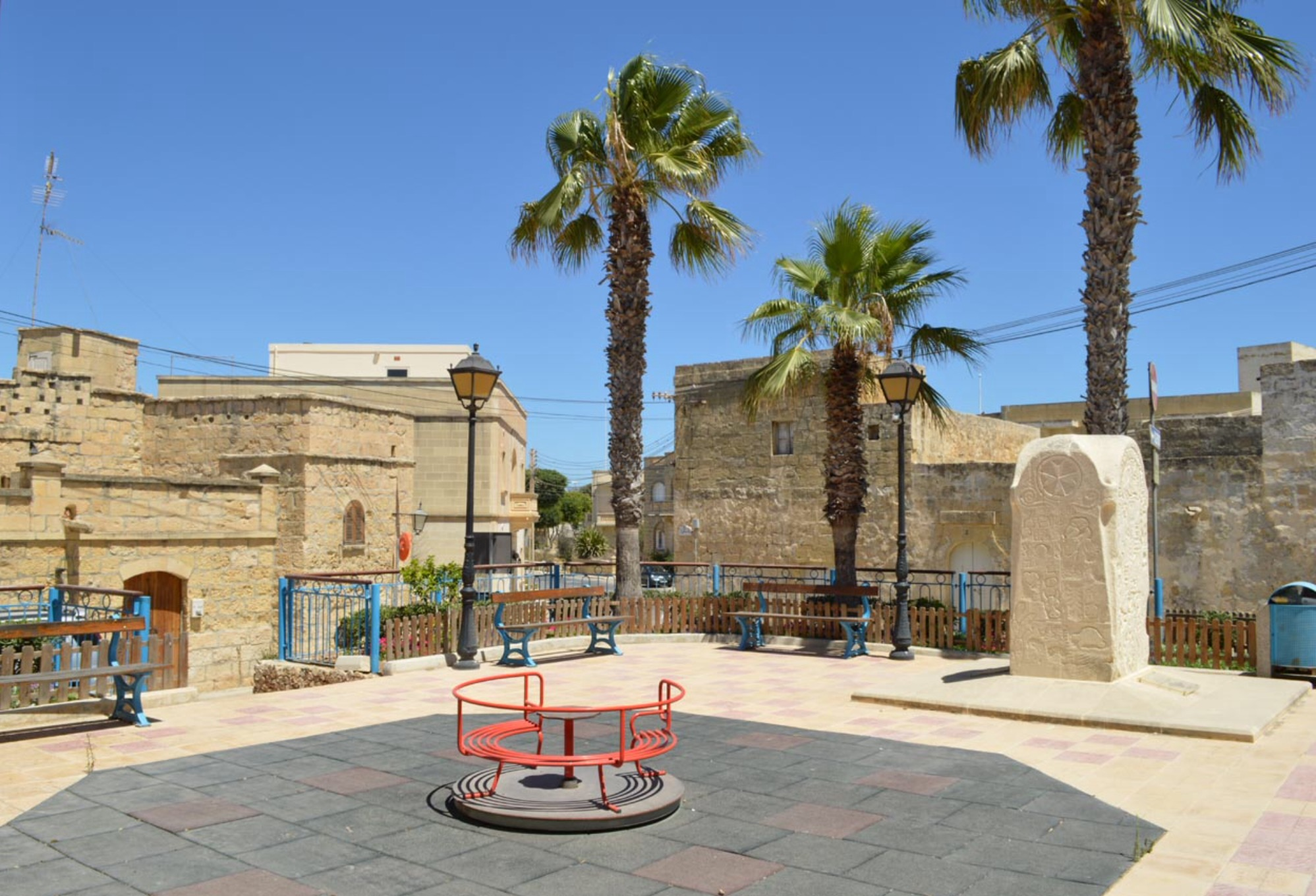
Munxar playing field

Remains of a megalithic temple were found in limits of Ta' Marżiena and also Roman remains were found in Xlendi valley. Geographically, Munxar has always formed part of the neighbouring village of Sannat. People of Munxar attended their spiritual needs at Saint Margaret parish at Sannat; however, historical facts and documented evidence points the existence of three other chapels, now completely demolished.

Late in the nineteenth century, the present parish priest of Sannat noticed the need for a small chapel for the spiritual need of the Munxarin, so a chapel was constructed in the site where the parish church now stands. In the following years, the chapel became too small since the village grew, and the rector of the chapel presented a petition to build a church to the bishop. The building of a new church was approved by the curia and on 2 February 1914 construction of a new church began on a site donated by two brothers and a sister known as 'Ta Katalla'. The church was finished on 19 February 1921. The church was dedicated to Saint Paul and later a statue of Saint Paul was made by Wistin Camilleri in 1933. Munxar church was made a parish on its own rights on 12 December 1957.

== Zones in Munxar ==
- Ġnien is-Sultan
- Il-mejda
- Sanap Cliffs
- Ta' Kamleta
- Ta' Luvier
- Ta' Marżiena
- Ta' Rinota
- Ta' Valletta
- Taksis
- Xlendi Valley

== Munxar Main Roads ==
- Triq Dun Spir Gauci (Fr. Spiridione Gauci Street)
- Triq il-Kalkara tal-Ġir (Klin Street)
- Triq il-Madonna tal-Karmnu (Our Lady of Monte Carmel Street)
- Triq it-12 ta' Diċembru 1957 (12 December 1957 Road)
- Triq iż-Żgħawri (Zghawri Street)
- Triq Ras il-Bajjada (Bajjada Point Street)
- Triq Santa Duminka (St Domenica Road)
- Triq Ta' Marziena (Ta' Marziena Road)

=== Other Streets at Munxar ===
- Daħla Ta' Kamleta (Ta' Kamleta Lane)
- Daħlet l-Isdieri (Breast Lane)
- Pjazza tal-Knisja (Church Square)
- Sqaq Dun Mikiel Anġ Spiteri (Fr. Micheal Angel Spiteri Alley)
- Sqaq it-Taksis (Taxis Alley)
- Sqaq Marżiena (Marziena Alley)
- Sqaq Ta' Rinota (Ta' Rinota Alley)
- Sqaq Wied l-Għawdxija (Gozitan Lady Valley Alley)
- Triq Bardan (Bardan Street)
- Triq Damasku (Damascus Street)
- Triq Dun Alan Fenech (Fr. Alan Fenech Street)
- Triq il-Munxar (Munxar Road)
- Triq it-Tempju (Temple Street)
- Triq Kolaċi (Kolaci Street)
- Triq Marżiena (Marziena Road)
- Triq l-10 ta' Frar (10 February Street)
- Triq l-Andrijiet (Andrijiet Road)
- Triq l-Isqawi (Sqawi Street)
- Triq Profs Ġużè Aquilina (Profs Guze Aquilina Street)
- Triq San Pawl (St. Paul Street)
- Triq Ta' Luvier (Ta' Luvier Road)
- Triq Ta' Rinota (Ta' Rinota Road)
- Triq Tarsu (Tarsus Street)
