= List of monuments in St. Paul's Bay =

This is a list of monuments in St. Paul's Bay, Malta, which are listed on the National Inventory of the Cultural Property of the Maltese Islands.

== List ==
Name of object	Location	Coordinates	ID	Photo	Upload
San Pawl Milqi	Triq San Pawl Milqi, Burmarrad	35°56′00″N 14°24′42″E	00014	San Pawl Milqi	Upload Photo
Xemxija prehistoric tombs	Triq il-Preistorja, Xemxija	35°57′00″N 14°22′54″E	00028	Xemxija prehistoric tombs	Upload Photo
St Paul Bay Tower and Battery	Triq San Ġiraldu / Triq San Franġisk	35°56′59″N 14°24′11″E	00055	St Paul Bay Tower and Battery	Upload Photo
Bugibba Temple	Triq id-Dolmen, Buġibba (backyard of Dolmen Hotel)	35°57′17″N 14°25′05″E	00056	Bugibba Temple	Upload Photo
Villa Preziosi	Triq Buġibba	35°56′58″N 14°24′27″E	01223	Villa Preziosi	Upload Photo
Villino Chappelle (garden mostly destroyed)	Triq il-Mosta	35°56′50″N 14°24′26″E	01224	Villino Chappelle (garden mostly destroyed)	Upload Photo
Palazzo Pescatore and Gardens	470 Triq San Pawl	35°56′54″N 14°23′53″E	01225	Palazzo Pescatore and Gardens	Upload Photo
Qawra Point Tower & Battery	Qawra Point, Qawra	35°57′33″N 14°25′29″E	01379	Qawra Point Tower & Battery	Upload Photo
Arrias Battery	"The Fortress", Telgħet ix-Xemxija, Xemxija	35°56′51″N 14°22′59″E	01398	Arrias Battery	Upload Photo
Vendôme Battery - Pwales	Triq San Pawl	35°56′42″N 14°23′08″E	01399	Vendôme Battery - Pwales	Upload Photo
Bugibba Battery	Dawret il-Ġżejjer, Bugibba	35°57′10″N 14°24′42″E	01400	Bugibba Battery	Upload Photo
Qawra Point Entrenchment	Triq it-Trunċiera, Qawra	35°57′28″N 14°25′19″E	01419	Qawra Point Entrenchment	Upload Photo
Perellos Redoubt	Dawrett il-Qawra, Salina	35°56′58″N 14°25′25″E	01428		Upload Photo
