= AX Odycy =

Building in Il-Qawra, San Pawl il-Baħar

General information
- Location: AX Odycy; Dawret il-Qawra; Il-Qawra, San Pawl il-Baħar
- Coordinates: 35°57′13″N 14°25′25″E
- Opening: 1987
- Owner: AX Hotels
- Operator: AX Hotels

Technical details
- Floor count: 9

Other information
- Number of rooms: 452
- Number of restaurants: Deck & Keel; Cheeky Monkey Gastopub; Trattoria Riccardo; Luzzu; Minoa

Website
- axhotelsmalta.com/odycy

AX Odycy, formerly the Seashells Resort at Suncrest is a resort in the area of Qawra, in Saint Paul's Bay, Malta built in 1987 as the Suncrest Hotel by Angelo Xuereb, owner of AX Holdings. As of 2009, Joseph Vella has been acting as a general manager.

== Ownership and Management ==
The resort has been owned and managed by AX Hotels, a subsidiary of AX Holdings, since 1987.

The Suncrest Hotel, as it was originally known, was managed by Sol Melia. The hotel was also known as Sol Suncrest.

In 2004, Sol Melia and AX Holdings mutually terminated their agreement.

In 2009, the hotel changed its name to Seashells Resort at Suncrest, and in then 2023, to AX Odycy.

== Renovations ==
The hotel's main restaurant, the Coral Cove, was fully remodeled in 2014 at a cost of over €500,000, including a new kitchen. It was later renamed to the Deck & Keel restaurant.

In 2015, a major renovation of all hotel rooms was undertaken at a cost of over €7 million. At the same time, the Cheeky Monkey Gastropub was opened and the Luzzu complex was annexed.

== Accommodation ==
The hotel has 452 rooms. The hotel also retains timeshare units.

== Dining ==
There are several restaurants attached or associated with the resort:

- The main buffet restaurant, the Deck & Keel, serves breakfast, lunch, and dinner in buffet style.
- The Cheeky Monkey Gastropub serves as a happy hour bar complemented with a pub grub menu.
- An Italian restaurant, Trattoria Riccardo and Italian/Mediterranean fusion at Luzzu.
- A fine-dining Mediterranean cuisine restaurant, Minoa, located on the hotel's top floor.

== Leisure ==
The resort has two pool areas, one for families, one for adults only, and a wellness spa.

== Conference ==
The hotel also houses a small conference center.
