= Pjazza (programme) =

Maltese television programme

Pjazza (meaning "Square") is a Maltese television programme shown on TVM, the national television station of Malta.

This programme begun in 2006 summer season, under the name Fil-Pjazza tar-Raħal ("In the Village Square") and then completed in the winter time with Kull Ħadd fil-Pjazza ("Every Sunday in the Square"), with a programme every Sunday morning. This programme now shortened to Pjazza because "everyone used to refer to it as Pjazza, so if you can't beat them, join them!" said Angie Laus, one of the programme's producers.

In summer 2006, the Pjazza team traveled all over Malta and Gozo, visiting places like Sliema, Birżebbuġa, Marsaskala, San Ġiljan, Żejtun, Marsalforn and other localities.

In 2006 this programme was presented by Peter Carbonaro, and in 2007, joining Peter Carbonaro, there is also Angie Laus herself, Elaine Saliba, and Fabrizio Faniello.

The signature tune of Pjazza is a song by Belle Perez and the resident band is Big Band Brothers.

- The first programme of Fil-Pjazza tar-Raħal broadcast from Qormi.
- The first programme of Kull Ħadd fil-Pjazza broadcast from Birkirkara.
- The first programme of Pjazza for summer 2007, broadcast from Buġibba in the locality of San Pawl il-Baħar.
- The second programme of Pjazza for summer 2007, broadcast from the city of Birgu in the region of Cottonera.
- The third programme of Pjazza for summer 2007, broadcast from Ta' Qali in the locality of Attard.
- The fourth programme of Pjazza for summer 2007, broadcast from Marsaskala Bay in the locality of Marsaskala.
- The fifth programme of Pjazza for summer 2007, broadcast from Xlendi in the locality of Munxar on the island of Gozo.
- The sixth programme of Pjazza for summer 2007, broadcast from Pretty Bay in the locality of Birżebbuġa.
- The seventh programme of Pjazza for summer 2007, broadcast for the second time from Buġibba in the locality of San Pawl il-Baħar.
- The eighth programmePjazza for summer 2007, broadcast from Spinola Bay in the locality of St. Julian's.
- The 9th programme of Pjazza for summer 2007, broadcast from Għar id-Dud in the locality of Sliema
- The 10th and the last programme of Pjazza for summer 2007, was broadcast from the locality of Mellieħa.

In the summer of 2008, Peter Carbonaro and Angie Laus together with J Anvil presented Pjazza while on a journey round the Maltese islands for 13 consecutive weeks. Pjazza offered a weekly entertainment show including both local and international bands and singers, a live resident 10-piece band led by Sigmund Mifsud and accompanied by Olivia Lewis.

The signature tune of Pjazza is a song by McFly and the resident band is Siggies Band.

- The first programme of Pjazza for summer 2008, was broadcast from the locality of Ta' Qali.
- The second programme of Pjazza for summer 2008, was broadcast from the locality of Buġibba.
- The third programme of Pjazza for summer 2008, was broadcast from the locality of Paceville.
- The fourth programme of Pjazza for summer 2008, was broadcast from the locality of Birkirkara.
- The fifth programme of Pjazza for summer 2008, was broadcast from the locality of Marsascala.
