= Clapham Junction (disambiguation) =

Clapham Junction is a railway station in London, England.

Clapham Junction may also refer to:

- Clapham Junction (area), an urban locality around Clapham Junction railway station
- Misraħ Għar il-Kbir, a prehistoric site on Malta
- Clapham Junction rail crash of 1988, near Clapham Junction railway station
- Clapham Junction (film), a 2007 film
