= Wardija Battery =

- Batterija tal-Wardija
- St. Paul's Bay, Malta
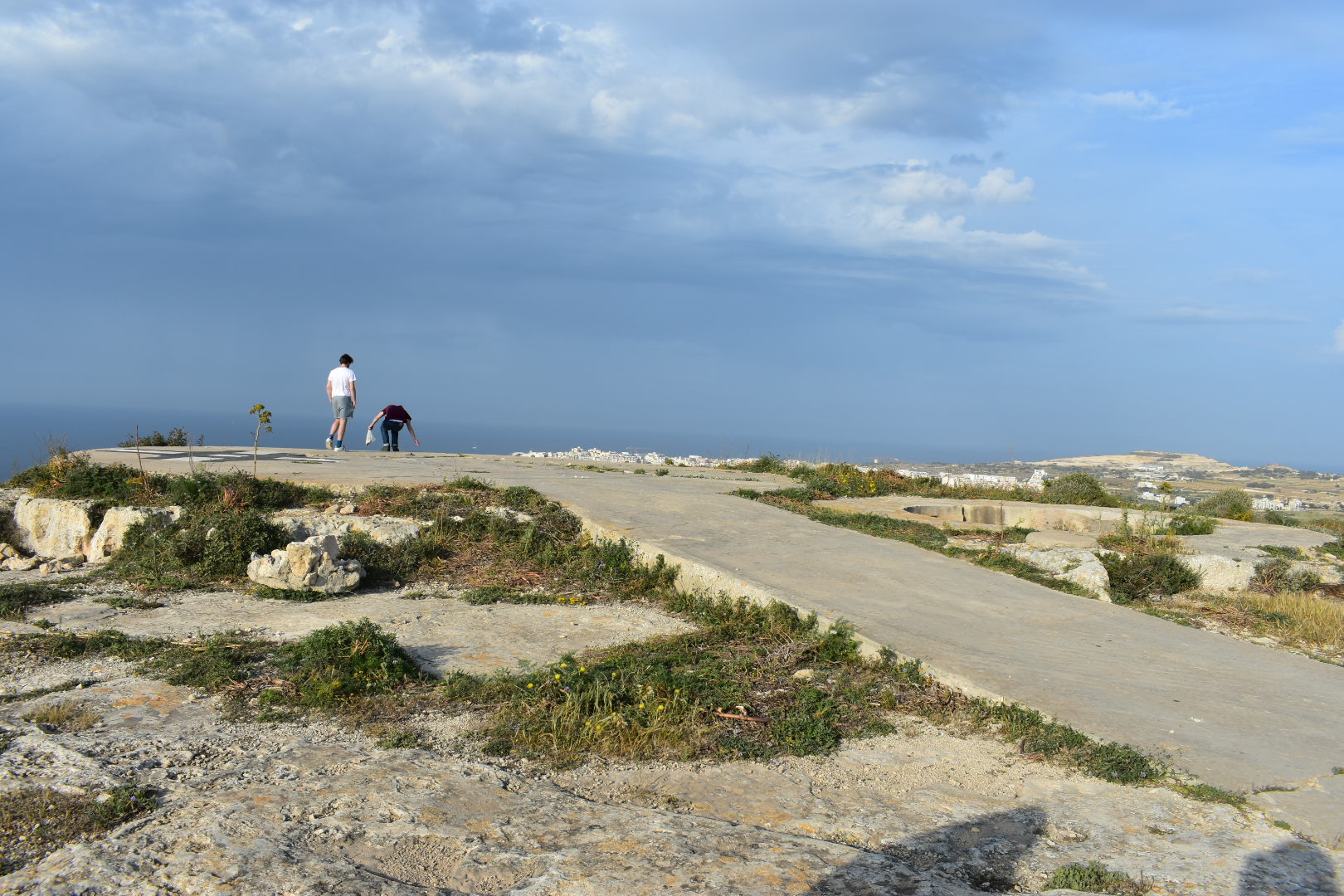
- Surveying control point (left) and gun emplacement (right)

Site information
- Type: Artillery battery
- Owner: Government of Malta
- Controlled by: Abandoned and dilapidated
- Open to the public: Yes
- Condition: Intact

Location
- Coordinates: 35°56′36.8″N 14°23′59.9″E

Site history
- Built: 1915
- Built by: British Empire
- In use: 1915–1938
- Materials: Reinforced concrete
- Battles/wars: World War I
- Events: Historic landmark

Garrison information
- Garrison: Western Section Royal Garrison Artillery

Wardija Battery (Maltese: Batterija tal-Wardija) was an artillery battery in Wardija, a hilltop in the limits of St. Paul's Bay, on the northern coast of Malta. It was built by the British in 1915, and saw use during World War I. It became obsolete following the construction of Fort Campbell in 1938.

== History ==
In October 1914, the British authorities made St. Paul's Bay an examination anchorage, and decided to build a battery to identify shipping on the way to the Grand Harbour, and fire warning shots to ships who were not obeying the regulations. In May 1915, two submarines were sighted off Malta outside the range of coastal artillery, hastening the need to build a battery in the north of the island.

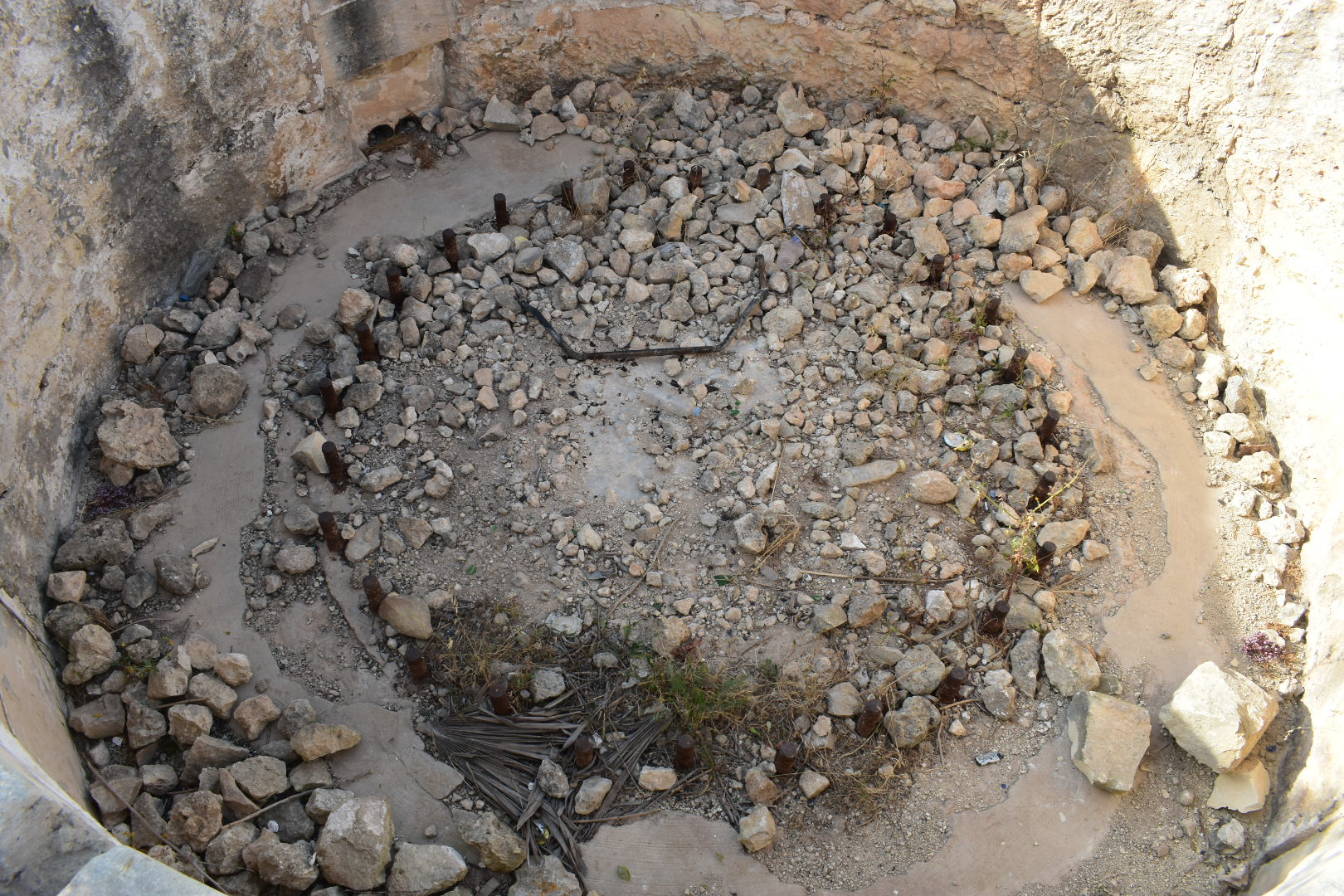
One of the gun emplacements

Between 30 November and 10 December 1915, the Royal Malta Artillery removed two 6-inch QF guns from the obsolete Wolseley Battery in the south of Malta, and mounted them in a position on the eastern end of the Wardija Ridge. The site was naturally protected so no permanent fortifications were built, and the battery only consisted of two gun emplacements. The two guns were designated Wardija Battery on 31 December 1915, and fell under the command of the Western Section Royal Garrison Artillery. The battery remained in active service throughout the course of World War I.

Wardija Battery became obsolete in 1938, when its role was taken over by Fort Campbell. In World War II, a gun-laying radar set was established on the site of the battery.

Wardija Battery's two gun emplacements are still intact today.
