= Wolseley Battery =

Artillery battery in Delimara, Marsaxlokk, Malta

- Batterija ta' Wolseley
- Marsaxlokk, Malta
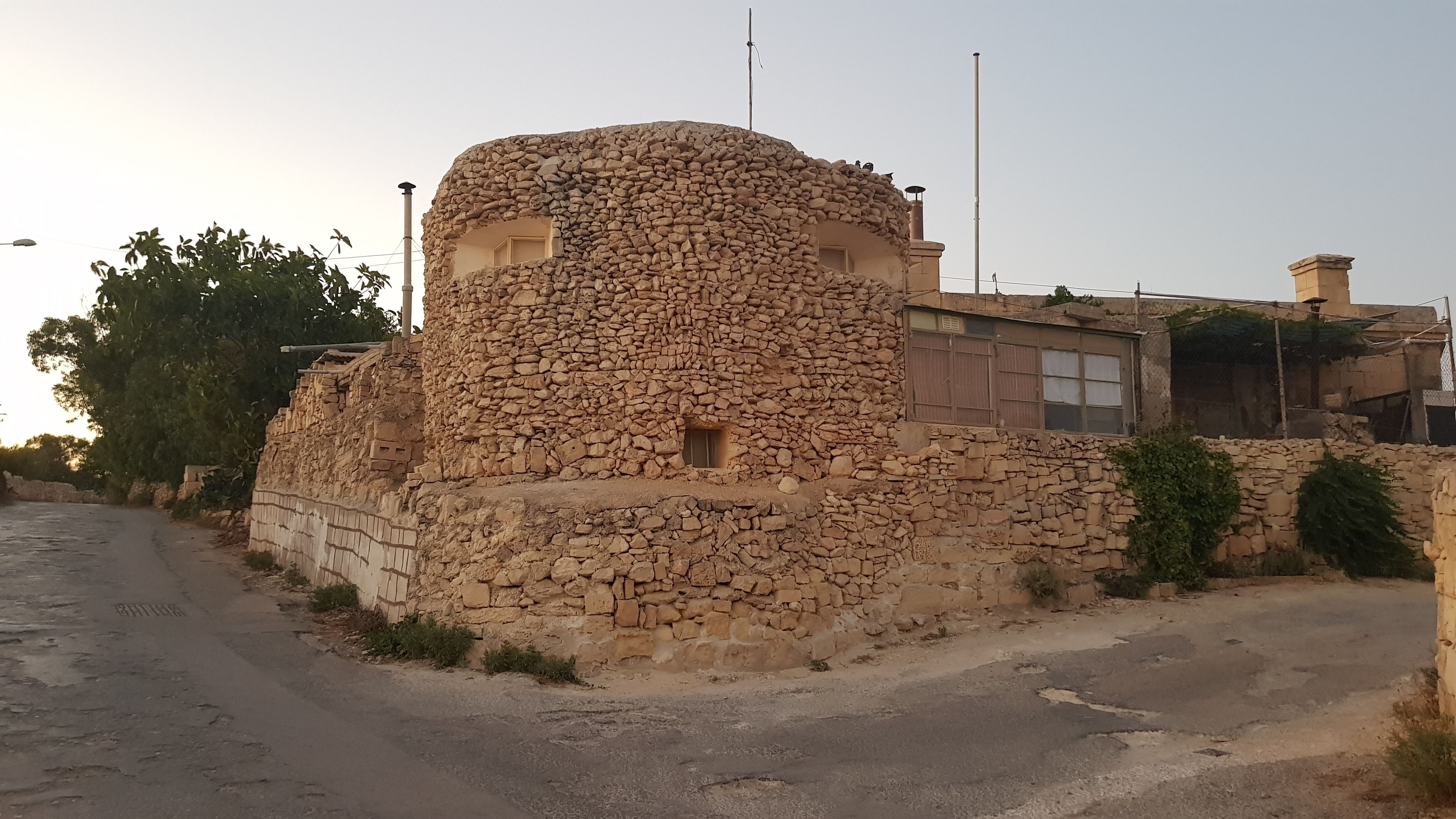
- The pillbox at Wolseley Battery in 2019

Site information
- Type: Artillery battery
- Open to the public: No
- Condition: Intact

Location
- Coordinates: 35°50′7.8″N 14°33′27.9″E
- Area: 14,700 m^{2} (158,000 sq ft)

Site history
- Built: 1897–1899
- Built by: British Empire
- In use: 1899–1916
- Materials: Concrete

Wolseley Battery (Maltese: Batterija ta' Wolseley) is an artillery battery in Delimara, Marsaxlokk, Malta. It was built by the British between 1897 and 1899, and is located close to Fort Tas-Silġ. Today, the battery still exists, but it is not accessible to the public.

== History ==
The Wolseley Battery is nicknamed by locals as Tal-Basal, meaning "of the onions". It was built between 1897 and 1899 to defend the area stretching from Delimara Point to Xrobb l-Għaġin. It formed part of a new series of fortifications meant to house breech-loading (BL) guns. The 18th century Tombrell Battery was demolished in the 19th century to clear Wolseley Battery's line of fire.

The battery has an oval plan with four gun emplacements, which originally contained two 9.2 inch and two 6 inch BL guns. The gun emplacements are surrounded by a shallow ditch, which was originally defended by barbed wire entanglements. The rear of the battery was sealed off by an iron fence. The battery also had machine gun emplacements, and it was the first fortification in Malta to have these features.

Wolseley Battery became obsolete by 1906, and its 6-inch guns were transferred to the newly built Wardija Battery near St. Paul's Bay in 1915. The battery was fully decommissioned a year later in 1916.

A stone-clad pillbox was built behind the officers' quarters in the 1930s.

== Present day ==
Today, the battery still exists, but there is no public access since it is private property. It is located close to the Delimara Power Station.

In 2015, the battery was shortlisted as a possible site for the campus of the proposed American University of Malta. It was not chosen, and the campus was split up between Dock No. 1 in Cospicua and Żonqor Point in Marsaskala.
