= 2011 Malta Open darts =

Malta Open

Tournament information
- Dates: 15 November 2011
- Location: Buġibba
- Country: Malta
- Organisation(s): BDO, WDF, MDA
- Winner's share: €1,200

Champion(s)
- (England) Paul Harvey

2011 Malta Open was a darts tournament part of the annual, Malta Open, which took place in Buġibba, Malta in 2011.

== Results ==
Round	Player
Winner	(England) Paul Harvey
Final	(Germany) Colin Rice
Semi-finals	(England) Chris Aubrey
Semi-finals	(England) Andy Keen
Quarter-finals	(Malta) Albert Scerri
Quarter-finals	(England) Eddie Simmonds
Quarter-finals	(Germany) Benny Sensenschmidt
Quarter-finals	(England) Jack Tweddell
Last 16	(Germany) Marcus Smith
Last 16	(Malta) Joe Mallia
Last 16	(Malta) Martin Azzopardi
Last 16	(Malta) Darren Camilleri
Last 16	(England) Surjan Kalyan
Last 16	(Malta) Emmanuel Borg
Last 16	(Malta) Godfrey Abela
Last 16	(Cyprus) Steve Claxton
Last 32	(England) Mark Haggerty
Last 32	(England) Scott Swinford
Last 32	(Malta) Clayton Gherxi
Last 32	(Malta) Neil Vassallo
Last 32	(England) Brian Marjerison
Last 32	(England) Kelly Corcoran
Last 32	(England) Bob Avenall
Last 32	(Netherlands) Peter La Rondelle
Last 32	(Malta) Stefan Licari
Last 32	(Malta) Carmelo Fenech
Last 32	(England) Mick Reed
Last 32	(Germany) Marco Remmier
Last 32	(Malta) Julian Bonello
Last 32	(Malta) Alfred Desira
Last 32	(Wales) Trevor Ellacott
Last 32	(Malta) Mario Camilleri
