= Fort Campbell (Malta) =

Former fort in Malta

- Forti Campbell
- Mellieħa, Malta
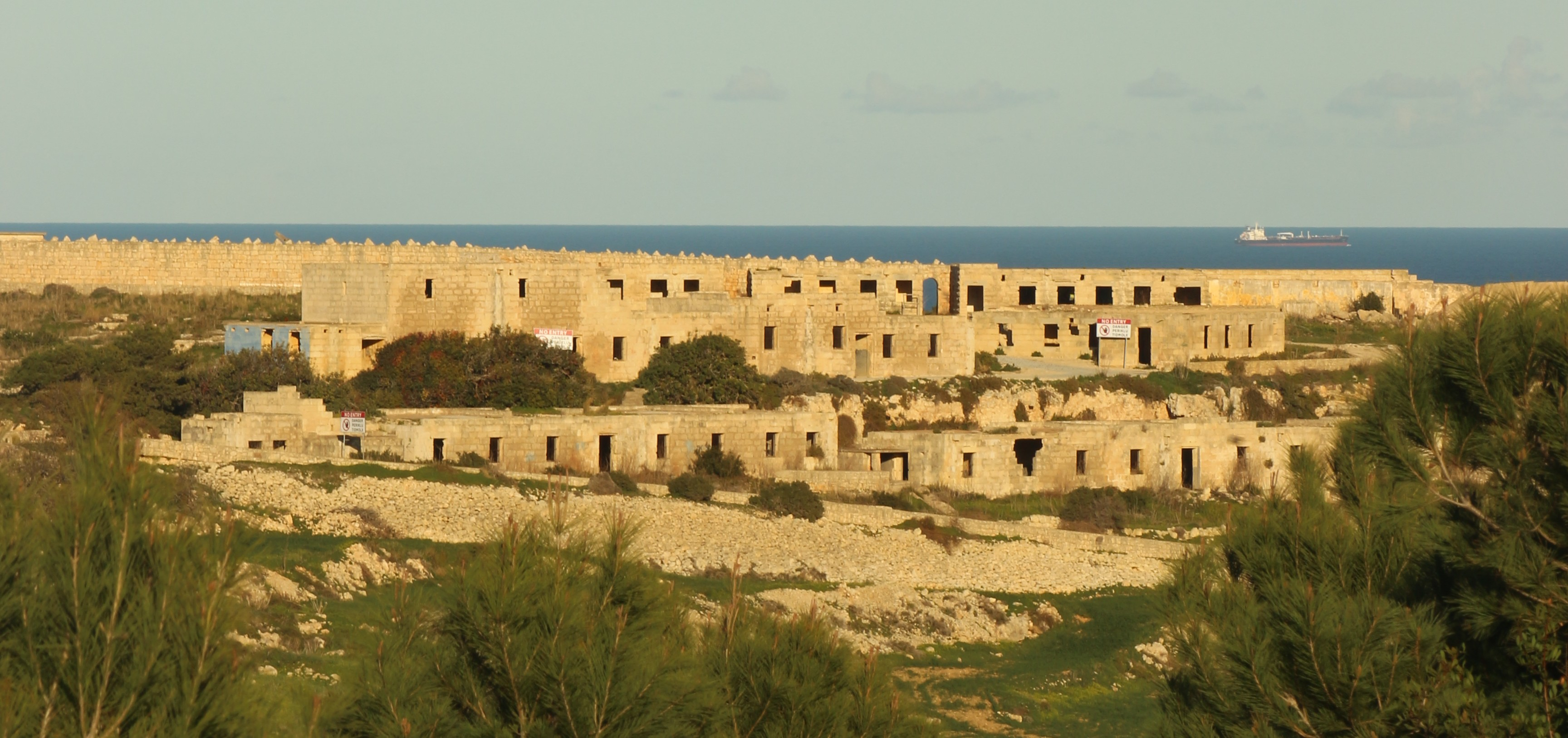
- Fort Campbell as viewed from Selmun

Site information
- Type: Fort
- Owner: Government of Malta
- Condition: Ruins

Location
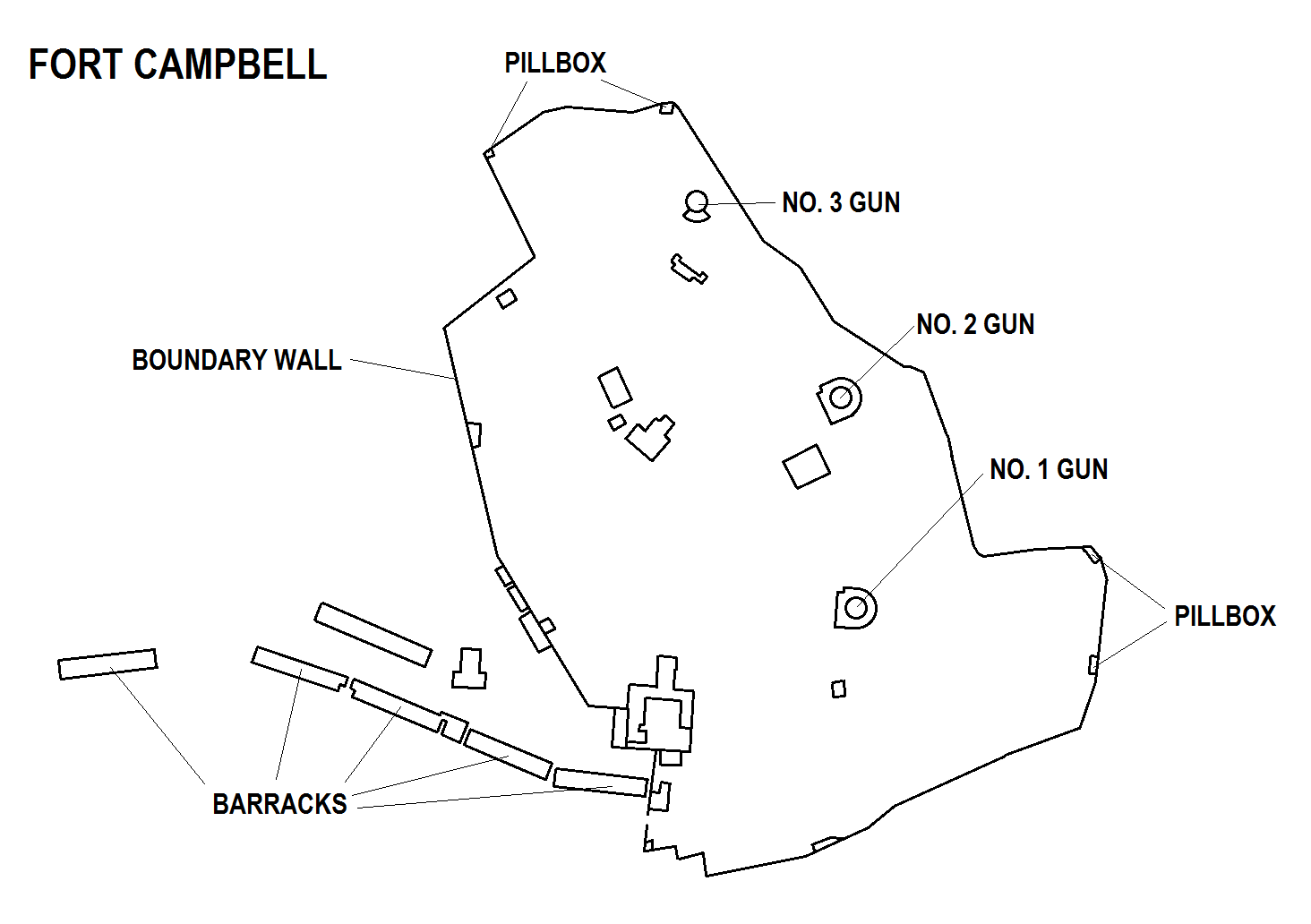
- Map of Fort Campbell
- Coordinates: 35°57′49.5″N 14°23′25.7″E

Site history
- Built: 1937–1938
- Built by: British Empire
- In use: 1938–1970s
- Materials: Limestone and concrete
- Battles/wars: World War II

Fort Campbell (Maltese: Forti Campbell or Fortizza ta' Campbell), also known locally as Il-Fortizza ta' Selmun, is a former fort in Mellieħa, Malta. It was built by the British during 1937 and 1938. It is notable as the most important fortification north of the Victoria Lines, and the last major fortification to be built in Malta. Today, it lies in ruins.

== History ==
Fort Campbell is located on the Selmun peninsula, roughly halfway between Mistra Battery and the ruins of Għajn Ħadid Tower, and facing St Paul's Islands. It was built to protect the approach to both Mellieħa Bay and St. Paul's Bay. It also protected British seaplanes which landed in Mistra Bay. The fort took over the role of Wardija Battery, which had been built in 1915.

Before construction of the fort began, Governor Charles Bonham-Carter visited the site. Work on the fort probably began in December 1937 and was hurried after the Munich Agreement of September 1938. The fort was modified throughout the course of World War II, when barracks were built and a radar was installed.

It is not known exactly when the fort was decommissioned. After the war, its strategic importance diminished and it was on the verge of being closed by 1949. However, the fort remained in military hands and a watchman remained stationed there until the 1970s.

== Layout ==
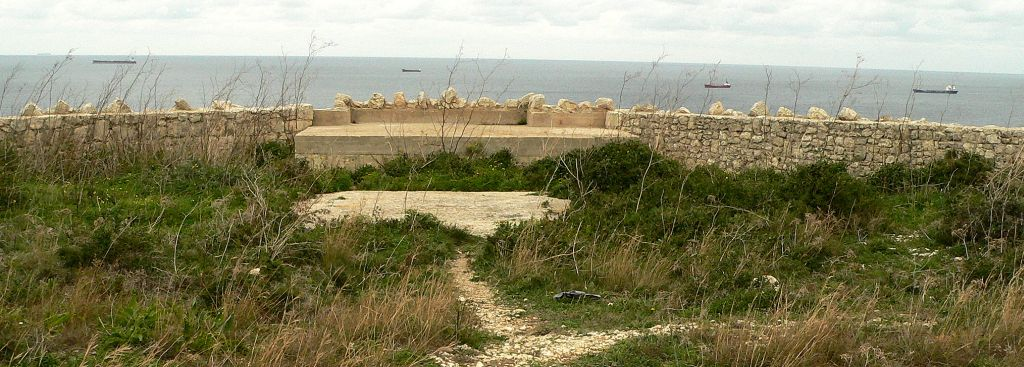
The perimeter wall

Fort Campbell is very different from earlier fortifications in Malta, such as the bastioned forts built by the Knights Hospitaller and the polygonal forts built by the British in the 19th century. Due to the new threat of aerial warfare, the fort was surrounded by a thin wall, and the buildings were placed at a distance from each other. Due to this, the fort was camouflaged as from the air it resembled the field walls of the surrounding countryside. Unlike many of the earlier fortifications, Fort Campbell was unadorned. For example, the fort's gateway is just a breach in the perimeter wall defended by a guard room, in contrast with the usually ornate gates of many Hospitaller or Victorian forts.

Fort Campbell's design is similar to other fortifications built before and during World War II throughout the British Empire, such as Fort Stanley in Hong Kong, Good Head Battery in New Zealand, Brownstone Battery in Devon, and Fort South Sutor in Scotland.

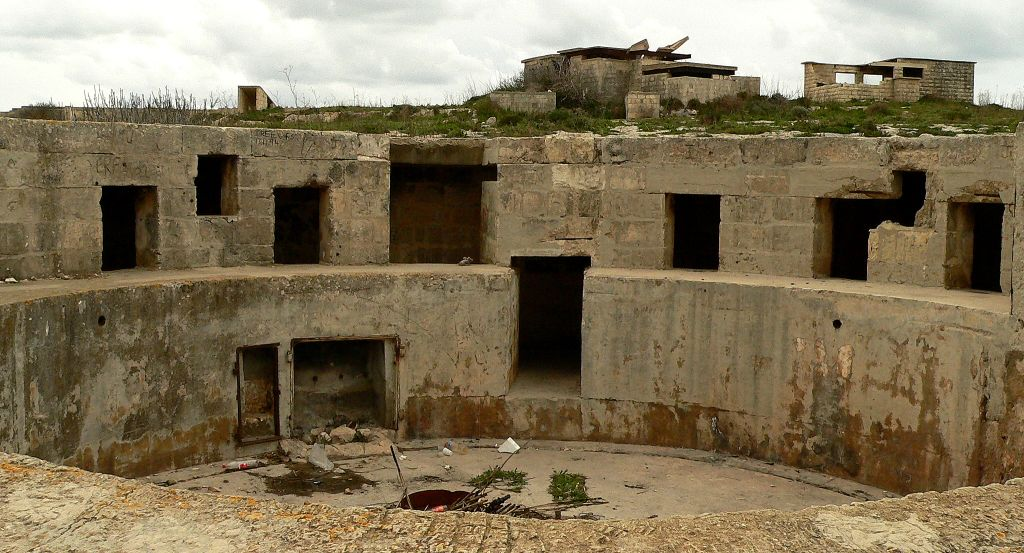
Gun emplacement and gun crew accommodation

The fort had two gun emplacements which were armed with 6-inch BL guns. A third gun emplacement may have housed another 6-inch gun or a heavy anti-aircraft gun. In addition, a number of concrete machine gun posts (similar to pillboxes) and rifle loopholes were placed at irregular intervals around the perimeter wall. The buildings in the fort included Battery Observation Post, which served as the command post of the fort and had a gun control room and an underground plotting room. The fort also had direction posts, a water tank, underground magazines, a generator room and rock-hewn bomb shelters. Defence Electric Lights and searchlight emplacements were also built outside the perimeter wall on the shoreline.

In 1942, barracks were built outside the fort to house the force of infantry that was stationed in Selmun. Various Nissen and Romney huts were also built inside and outside the fort.

== Present day ==
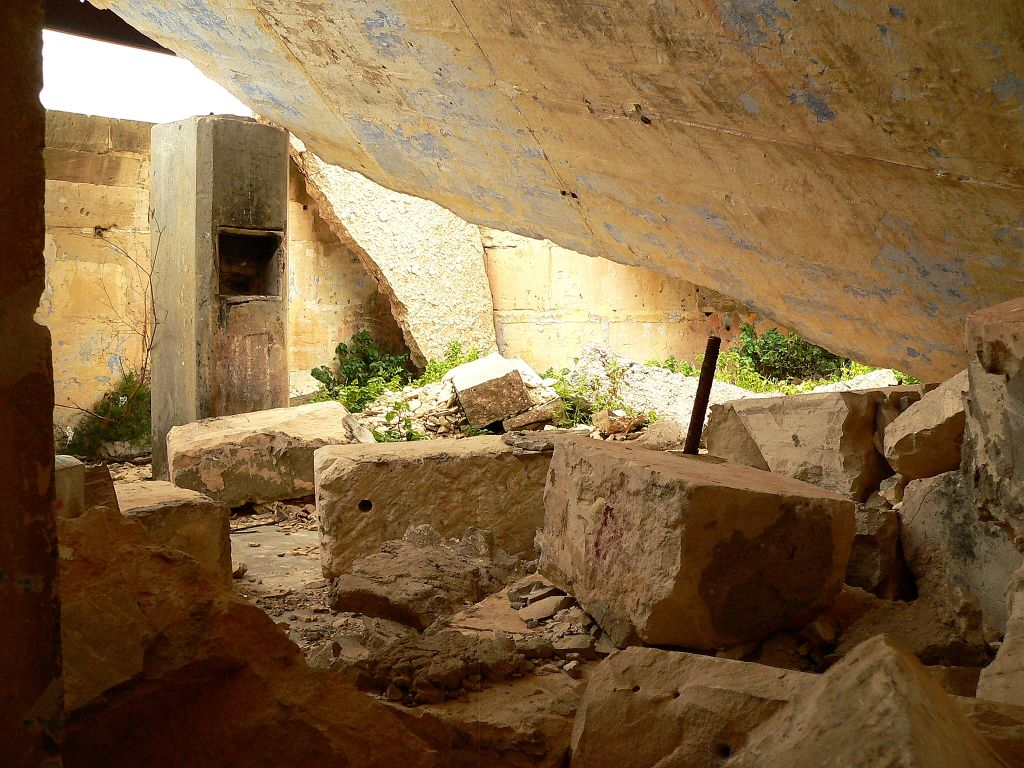
Collapsed roof of the gun control room of the Battery Observation Post

Since Fort Campbell was decommissioned, it has fallen into a state of neglect and disrepair. It still retains most of its original features, although many rooms are in ruins. The fort was vandalized repeatedly, and in 2004 the fire control position was completely destroyed by vandals. At some point, the iron beams that supported the roof of the barracks were stolen, and due to this some of the blocks have collapsed or are in danger of collapsing. Since the fort is abandoned, it is possible to enter, but parts of it are dangerous to visitors.

The mayor of the Mellieħa Local Council, Robert Cutajar, is attempting to restore the fort. Until now, the site was never restored since it would be very expensive given the large area of the fort. It has been proposed that the site be rehabilitated as a picnic or camping site. In 2014, Prime Minister Joseph Muscat stated that the government intends to rehabilitate the fort and the surrounding area.
