= Wardija Ridge =

Coordinates: 35°56′32.9″N 14°23′49.4″E

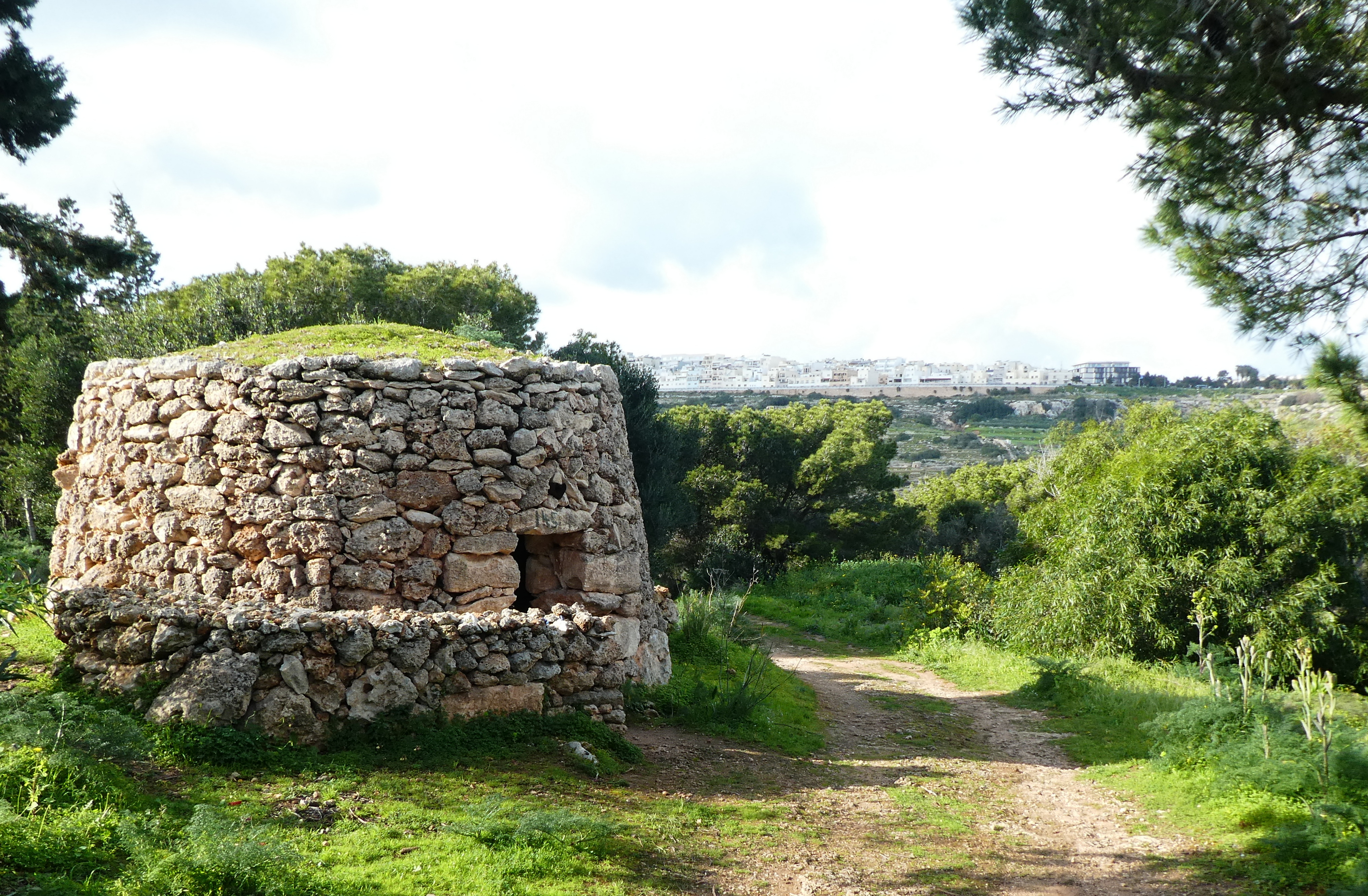

Wardija Ridge is a plateau found in a group in the north of Mġarr, Malta, just outside of Wardija. Wardija Ridge is part of a series of hills that run on a southwest-northeast axis from the Għajn Tuffieħa area in Mġarr to the Xemxija Bay area in St. Paul's Bay. The Northern ridge edge is interrupted by a series of valley systems which discharge into il-Wied tal-Pwales.

Located at 35°55'54.02" latitude and 14°22'18.01" longitude, the 139-meter-high Wardija Ridge has a total of more than 40 tourist attraction spots divided into six sections.

Wardija Ridge has been assigned a Level 2 degree of protection as Areas of Ecological Importance and Sites of Scientific Importance, and supports important garigue communities characterized by rare species. Other levels of protection have been given to the three valley systems in the scheduled areas, the upper reaches of the watercourse of Il-Wied ta' San Martin and the Southern part of the promontory known as L-Argentier.

In 1915, the British built Wardija Battery on the east end of the ridge. The battery became obsolete in 1938, but its gun emplacements remain.
