= Buġibba Battery =

Artillery battery in Matla

- Batterija ta' Buġibba
- Buġibba, St. Paul's Bay, Malta
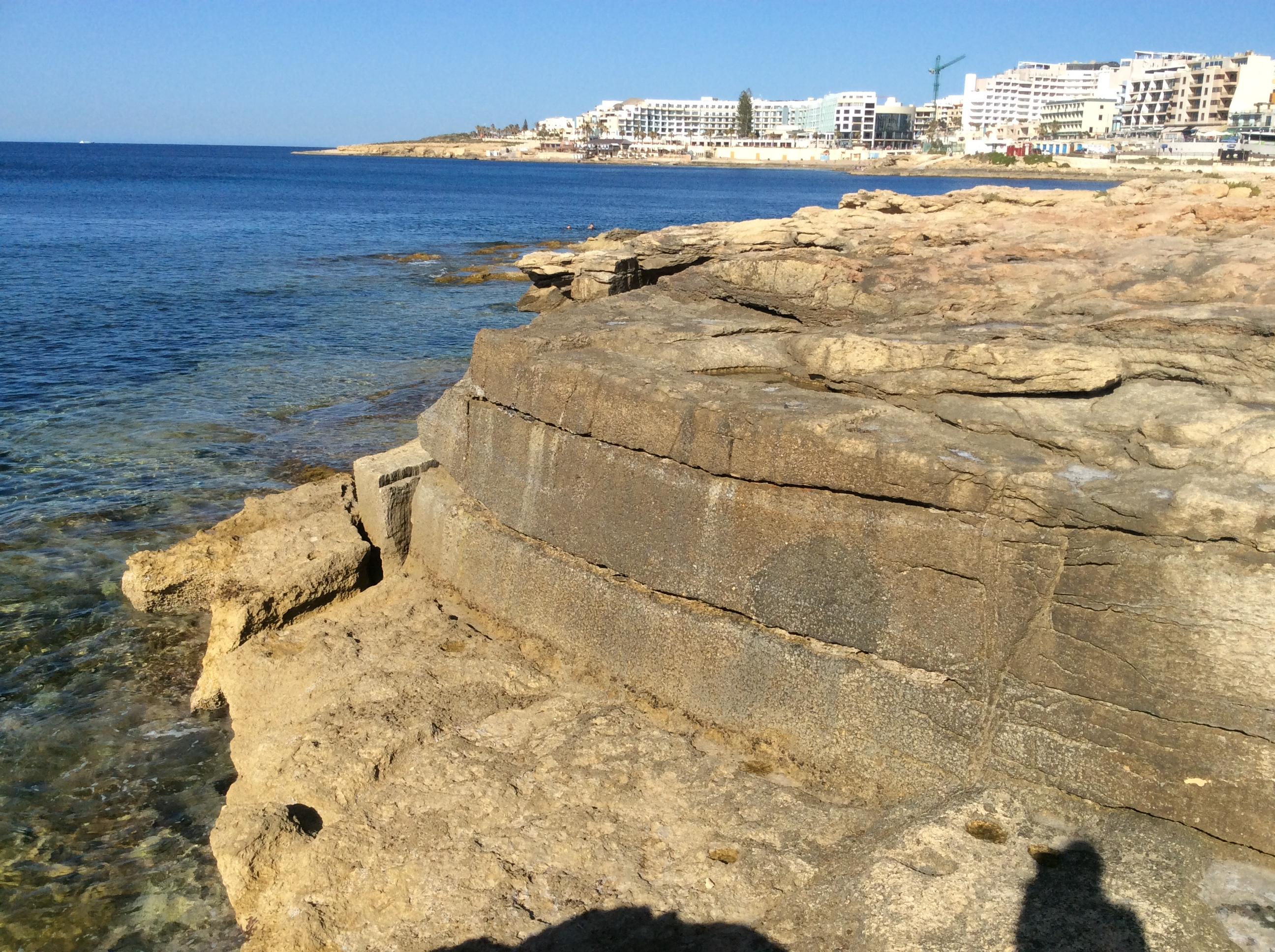
- The site of Bugibba Battery, showing the remains of the ditch

Site information
- Type: Artillery battery
- Owner: Government of Malta
- Condition: Only rock-hewn ditch and foundations remain

Location
- Coordinates: 35°57′10.2″N 14°24′41.9″E

Site history
- Built: 18th century
- Built by: Order of Saint John
- Materials: Limestone
- Fate: Demolished

Buġibba Battery (Maltese: Batterija ta' Buġibba), also known as Elbene Battery (Maltese: Batterija ta' Bileben), was an artillery battery in Buġibba, limits of St. Paul's Bay, Malta. It was built in the 18th century, by the Order of St. John, as one of a series of coastal fortifications around the coasts of the Maltese islands. The battery no longer exists, but its rock-hewn ditch and some foundations can still be noticed.

== History ==
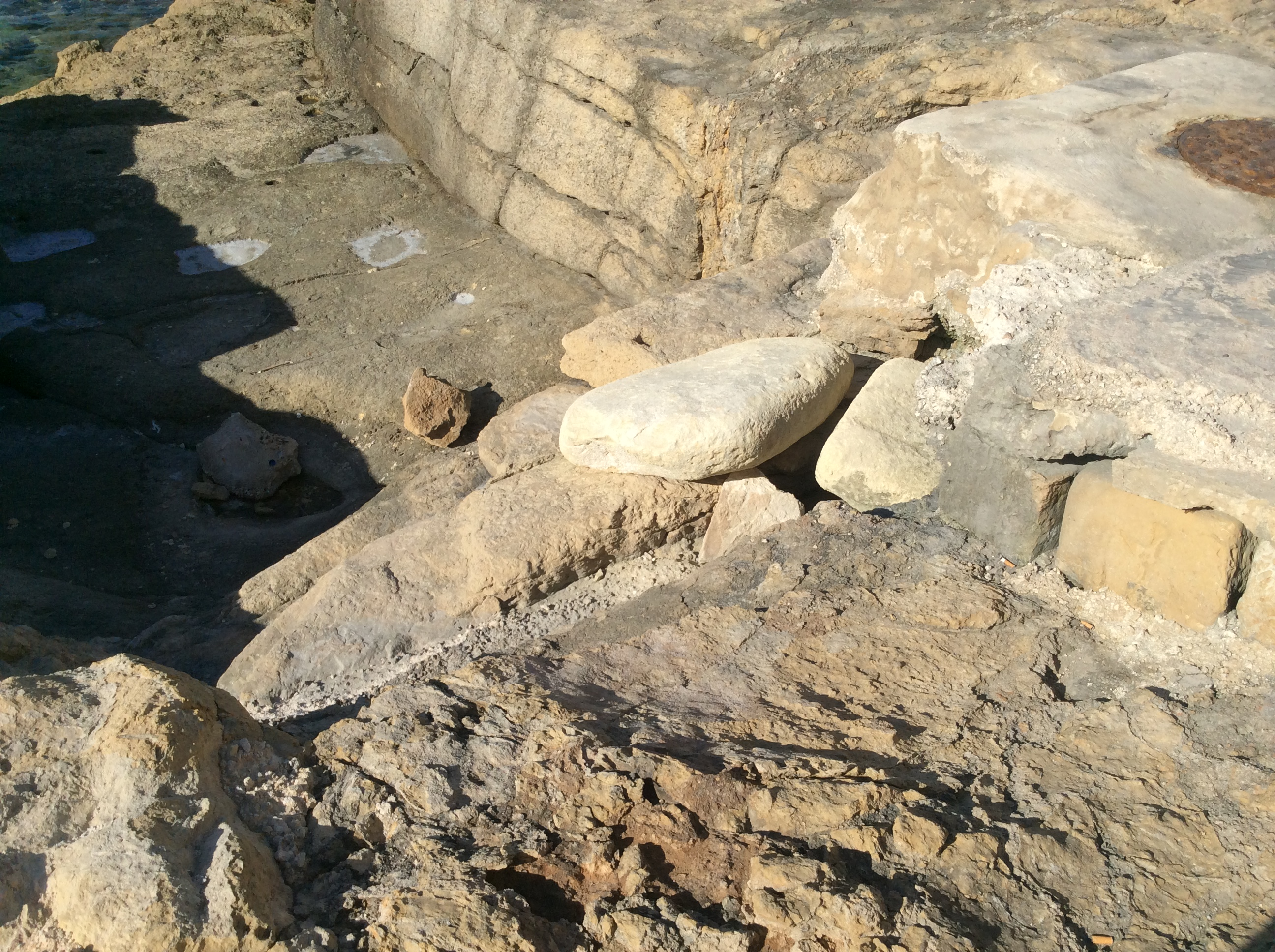
Some remains of the battery

Buġibba Battery was built in the 18th century during one of the building programmes of coastal batteries in Malta. Sources conflict as to whether it was built in 1715–16, or sometime between 1747 and 1784. It was one of a series of fortifications defending St. Paul's Bay, with the nearest ones to it being Wignacourt Tower to the southwest and Qawra Tower to the northeast.

The battery's exact layout is not known, but it had a semi-circular gun platform with a parapet, and a blockhouse at the rear. It was surrounded by a ditch which was filled with seawater.

== Present day ==
Today, the battery no longer exists, but some of its rock-hewn foundations and ditch can still be seen. The ditch and the remains are listed on the National Inventory of the Cultural Property of the Maltese Islands.
