= Postal codes in Malta =

Post codes in Malta are seven-character strings that form part of a postal address in Malta. Post codes were first introduced in 1991 by the national mail operator MaltaPost. Like those in the United Kingdom and Canada, they are alphanumeric.

== Format ==
Since 2007, Maltese post codes consist of three letters that differ by locality, and four numbers. For example, an address in the capital Valletta would have the following postcode:

Malta Chamber of Commerce
Exchange Buildings
Republic Street
Valletta VLT 1117

Exceptionally some postcodes begin with two letters (e.g. TP for Tigné Point).

=== Pre-2007 format ===
In the previous format, the post codes consisted of three letters and two digits, written after the name of the locality.

Malta Chamber of Commerce
Exchange Buildings
Republic Street
Valletta VLT 05

== Post codes and localities ==
These are the different post codes and the localities that use them:

- ATD: Attard (including Ta' Qali)
- BBG: Birżebbuġa (including Ħal Far, Kalafrana and Qajjenza)
- BKR: Birkirkara (including Fleur-de-Lys and Swatar)
- BML: Bormla
- BRG: Birgu
- BZN: Balzan
- CBD: Central Business District, Mrieħel (split between the localities of Birkirkara, Ħal Qormi, and Santa Venera)
- DGL: Dingli
- FGR: Fgura
- FNT: Fontana
- FRN: Floriana
- GDJ: Gudja
- GHR: Għargħur
- GRB: Għarb
- GSM: Għajnsielem
  - KMN: Comino (Kemmuna)
- GSR: Għasri
- GXQ: Għaxaq
- GZR: Gżira (including Manoel Island)
- HMR: Ħamrun
- IKL: Iklin
- ISL: Isla (Senglea)
- KCM: Kerċem (including Santa Luċija)
- KKP: Kirkop
- KKR: Kalkara
  - SCM: SmartCity Malta
- LJA: Lija
- LQA: Luqa (including Ħal Farruġ)
- MDN: Mdina
- MGR: Mġarr (including part of Għajn Tuffieħa and Żebbiegħ)
- MLH: Mellieħa (including Ċirkewwa, Għadira, part of Għajn Tuffieħa, Manikata and Marfa)
- MQB: Mqabba
- MRS: Marsa
  - MTP: MaltaPost Marsa complex
- MSD: Msida (including Swatar)
- MSK: Marsaskala
- MST: Mosta (including part of Bidnija)
- MTF: Mtarfa
- MXK: Marsaxlokk
- MXR: Munxar
- NDR: Nadur
- NXR: Naxxar (including Baħar iċ-Ċagħaq, Birguma, Magħtab, Salina and San Pawl tat-Tarġa)
- PBK: Pembroke
- PLA: Paola (Raħal Ġdid)
- PTA: Pietà (including Gwardamanġa)
- QLA: Qala
- QRD: Qrendi
- QRM: Qormi
- RBT: Rabat (including Baħrija, Mtaħleb and Tal-Virtù)
- SFI: Safi
- SGN: San Ġwann (including Kappara)
- SGW: Siġġiewi
- SLC: Santa Luċija
- SLM: Sliema
  - TP: Tigné Point
- SLZ: San Lawrenz
- SNT: Sannat
- SPB: Saint Paul's Bay (including Buġibba, Burmarrad, part of Bidnija, Pwales, Qawra, San Martin, Wardija and Xemxija)
- STJ: St. Julian's (including Paceville)
  - SPK: Spinola Park
- SVR: Santa Venera
- SWQ: Swieqi (including Ibraġ and Madliena)
- TXN: Tarxien
- VCT: Victoria
- VLT: Valletta
- XBX: Ta' Xbiex
- XJR: Xgħajra
- XLN: Xlendi
- XRA: Xagħra
- XWK: Xewkija
- ZBB: Żebbuġ, Gozo
  - MFN: Marsalforn
- ZBG: Żebbuġ, Malta
- ZBR: Żabbar (including Saint Peters)
- ZRQ: Żurrieq (including Bubaqra)
- ZTN: Żejtun
