= Mistra Bay =

- Il-Bajja tal-Mistra
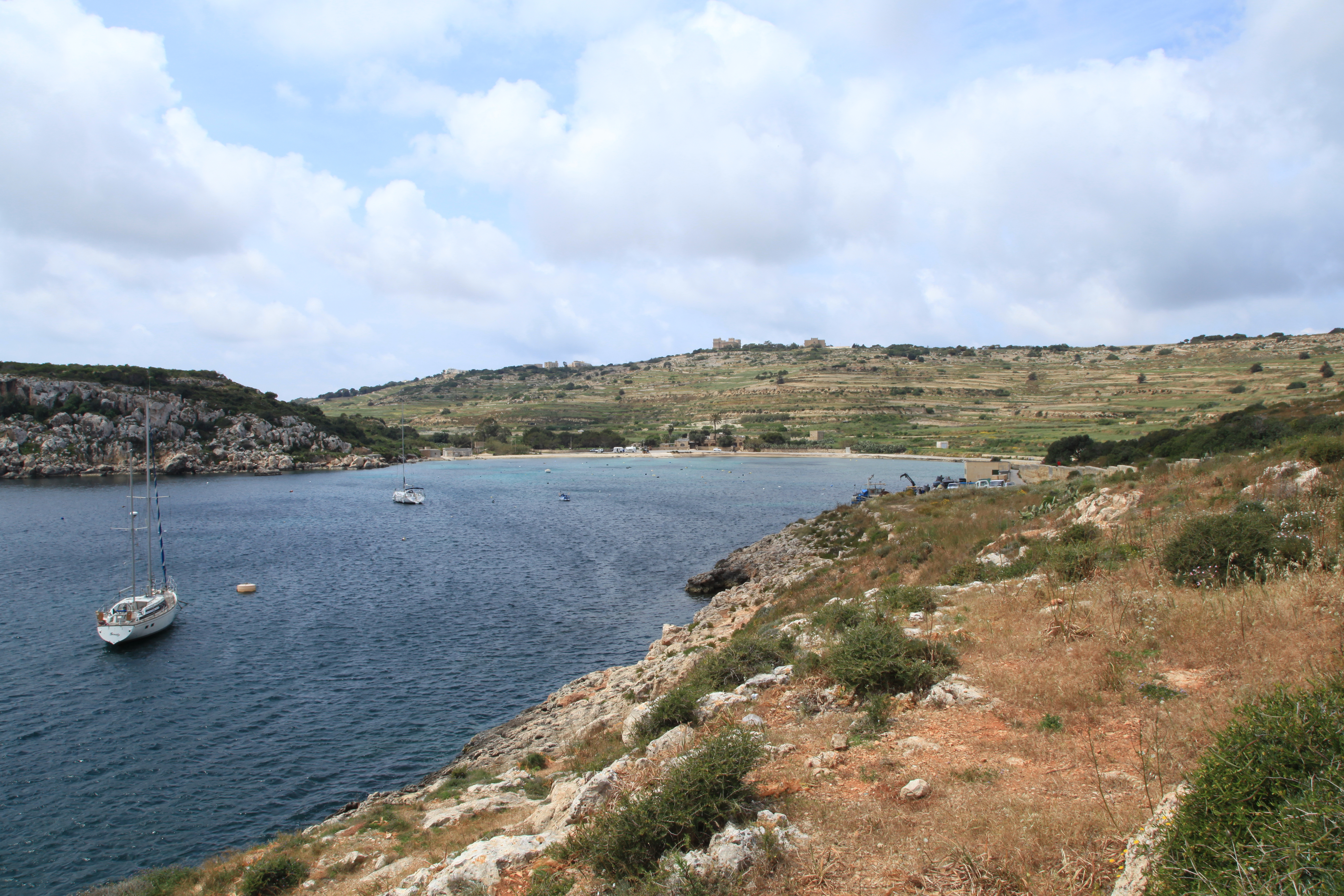
- Mistra Bay

- Location of Mistra Bay in Malta
- Location: St. Paul's Bay, Mellieħa, Malta
- Coordinates: 35°57′29″N 14°23′30″E
- Type: Bay
- Max. length: 385 metres (1,263 ft)
- Max. width: 456 metres (1,496 ft)
- Surface area: 8.51 hectares (21.0 acres)
- Max. depth: 6.9 metres (23 ft)
- Shore length^{1}: 1.2 kilometres (0.75 mi)
- ^{1} Shore length is not a well-defined measure.

Mistra Bay (Maltese: Il-Bajja tal-Mistra) is a bay in northeastern Malta, near Mellieħa. The bay is surrounded by cliffs and is considered an inlet of St. Paul's Bay. To the north, lies Selmun Palace. The Mistra Battery is found on the east side of the bay. Two restaurants are also in the north side of the bay, connected via a rugged road. Several fish farms are located around 595 metres (1,952 ft) offshore. Recent clean ups have also reduced the amount of waste found on the beach. The beach present is made out of pebbles and has been cited by Roman and Phoenician authors living in Melite.
