= Malta Classic Car Museum =

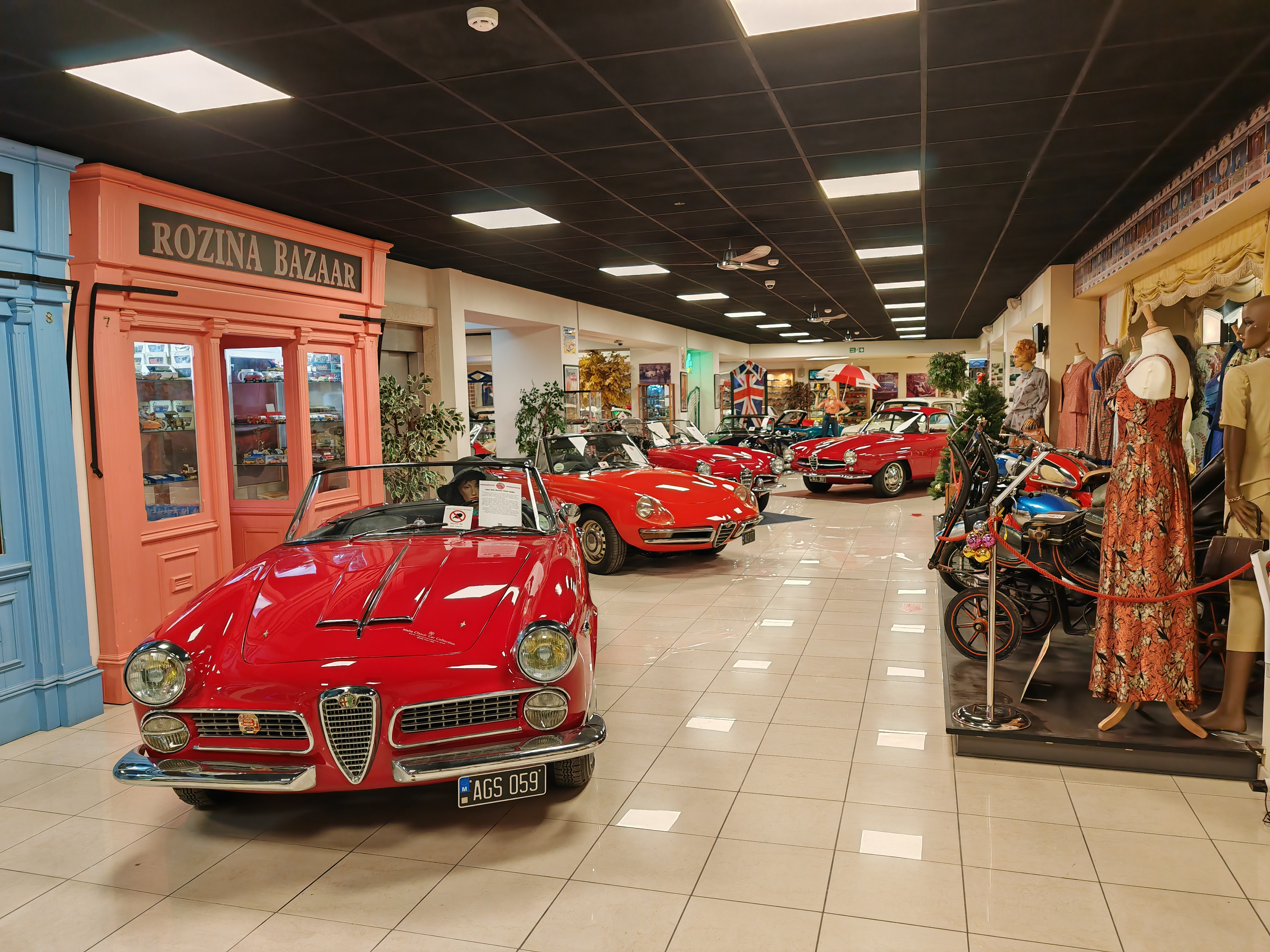
- Location: Tourists Lane, Qawra, Malta
- Coordinates: 35°57′19″N 14°25′14″E
- Founder: Carol Galea
- Website: www.classiccarsmalta.com

The Malta Classic Car Museum is a museum on the island state of Malta. The Classic Car Collection was created by Mr. Carol Galea, a car enthusiast. He became interested in classic cars after customising and building cars for local hillclimbing races. There are 107 sports cars and 45 motorcycles.

The museum has a variety of cars, ranging from Jaguar E Type to a 1972 Fiat 500F which have all been restored and preserved. The museum displays contain the dates, variants, production runs and stories of how each model came into the collection.
