= Misraħ Għar il-Kbir =

Collection of cart ruts in Dingli, Malta

Coordinates: 35.8519°N 14.3967°E

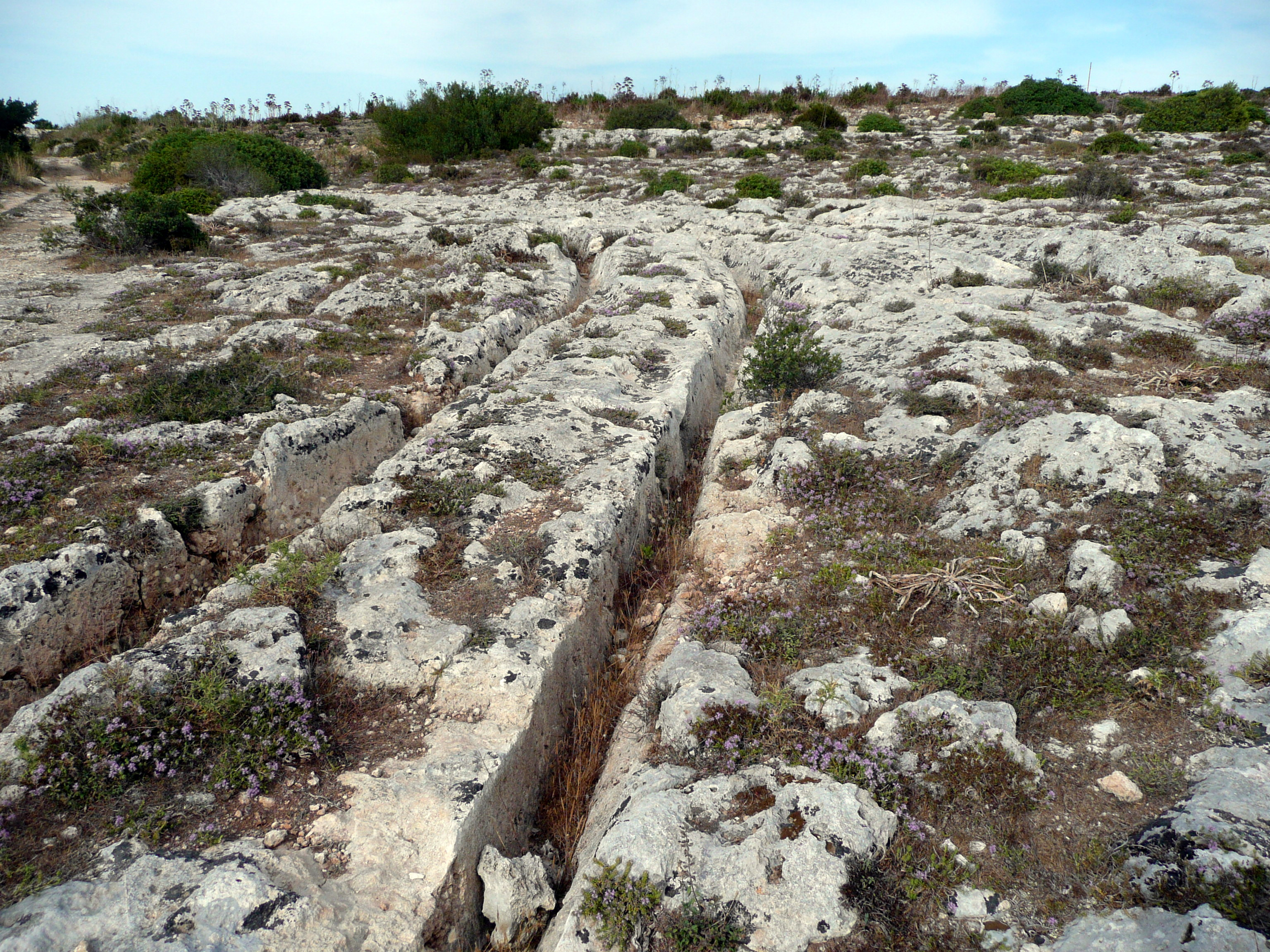
Cart Ruts at Misrah Ghar il-Kbir

Misrah Ghar il-Kbir (informally known as Clapham Junction) is a prehistoric site in Siġġiewi, in the south of the Island of Malta, near the Dingli Cliffs. It is best known for its "cart ruts", a complex network of tracks carved in the rock. The age and purpose of the tracks is uncertain with estimates of their origins ranging from the Neolithic to Medieval times and all points in-between. Several researchers have suggested they may have been used in different periods perhaps even for different activities. It appears the ruts could only have been made no later than c.700BC with several examples pointing to a Temple Period date c. 3800-2500BC.

It is reported that the "Clapham Junction" nickname was given by archaeologist David H. Trump, who reported that it reminded him of the busy railway station Clapham Junction in London.

== Origin of the tracks ==
Similar tracks (known and signposted in Malta as 'Cart Ruts') can be found in a number of sites on both the major islands. Busewdien in St Paul's Bay, Naxxar, San Ġwann and Bidnija are good examples on the main Island. Gozo's best are on the Ta' Ċenċ plateau, Sannat.

Those at Misraћ Gћar il-Kbir are up to 60 centimetres (24 in) deep and have an average distance between them of 110 to 140 cm (43 to 55 in). Some cross while others form junctions, creating the illusion of a great rail yard.

In some places in Malta, such as at St. George's Bay on Birżebbuġa, the tracks run into the sea and continue underwater, leading to some media speculation that they were made during the last Ice Age, when the sea level was lower. (The earliest other evidence known of human habitation on Malta is from about 5900 BC).

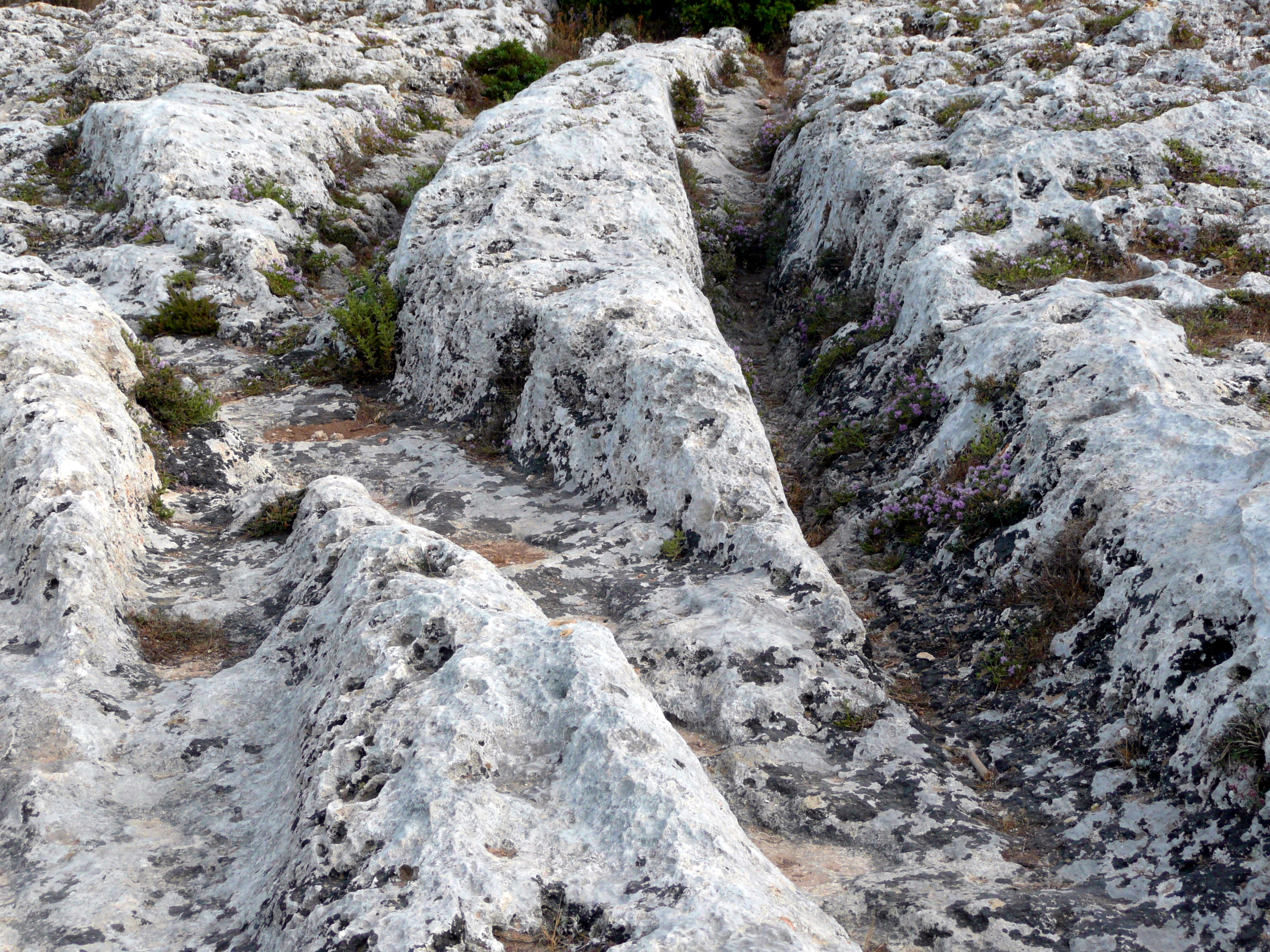
A cart ruts junction at Ghar il-Kbir

Research published in 2008 describes them as caused by wooden-wheeled carts eroding soft limestone. An analysis was made of the stresses that would have been caused by a cart which would fit the ruts. Professor Mottershead of Portsmouth University said "The underlying rock in Malta is weak and when it's wet it loses about 80 percent of its strength. The carts would have first made tracks in the soil but when that eroded, the cartwheels ran directly on the bedrock, making it easier for other carts to follow the same tracks."

== See also ==
- Diolkos
- Absheron's stone roads
