= Buġibba Temple =

Megalithic temple ruins in Malta

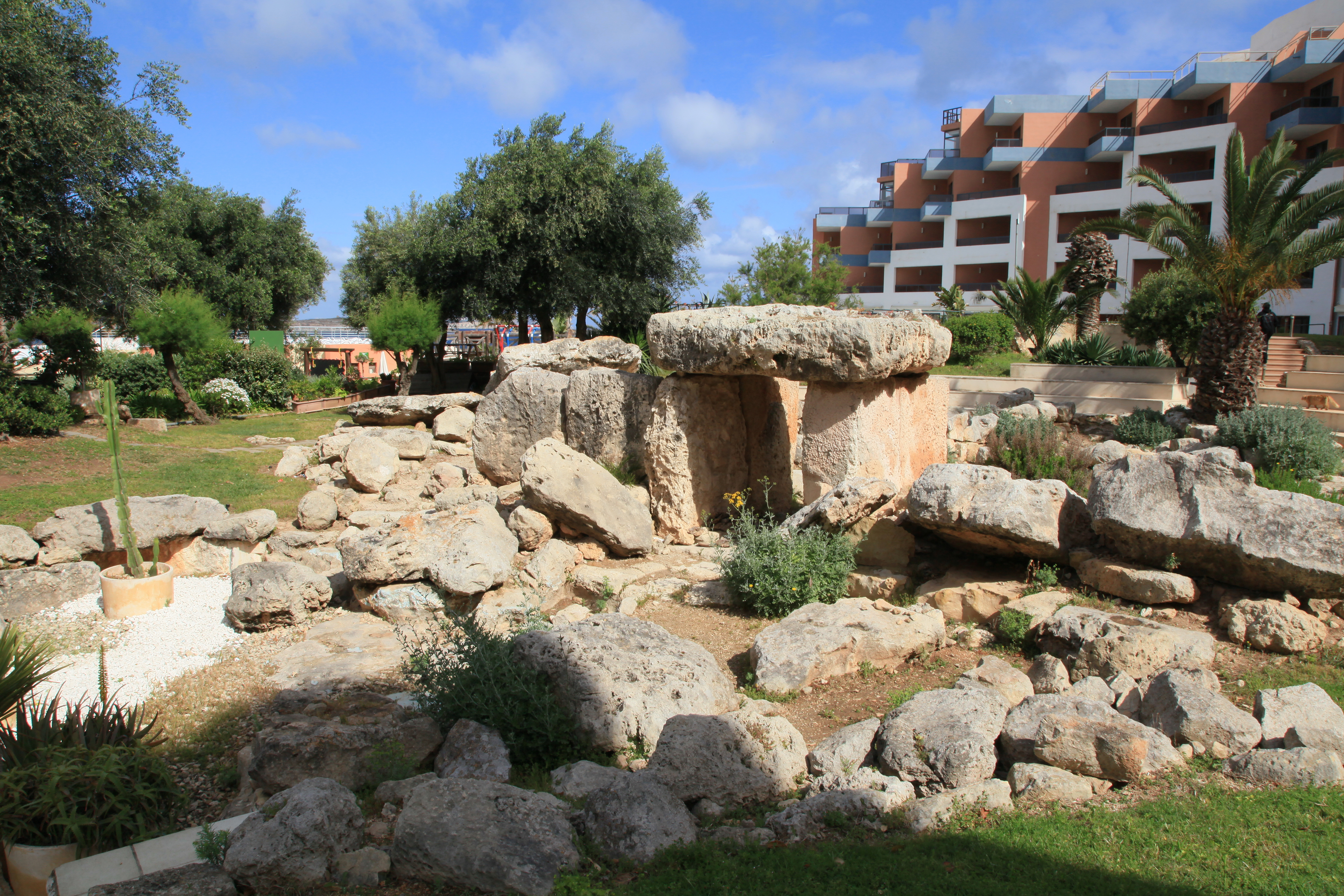
- Buġibba Temple with the Dolmen Resort Hotel to the right

- Location in Malta
- 35°57′17″N 14°25′5.2″E
- Type: Temple
- Periods: Tarxien phase
- Location: St. Paul's Bay, Northern Region, Malta
- Part of: Megalithic Temples of Malta

History
- Built: c. 2800 BC

Site notes
- Material: Limestone
- Excavation dates: 1928, 1954
- Archaeologists: Themistocles Zammit; L. J. Upton Way
- Discovered: 1925 by Themistocles Zammit
- Condition: Ruins
- Public access: Yes

Buġibba Temple is a megalithic temple on the border of Buġibba and Qawra towns, limits of St. Paul's Bay, Malta. A hotel was built on the grounds of the temple.

== Site ==
The temple is located a short distance from the coast, between Buġibba and Qawra Point. It was built during the Tarxien phase of Maltese prehistory. The temple is quite small, and part of its coralline limestone façade can still be seen. From the trilithon entrance, a corridor leads to a central area which contains three apses. Part of the temple's floor has also survived at the back of the site.

The rest of the structure was destroyed over the years, as the area was leveled due to being used for agricultural purposes.

== Excavations and recent history ==
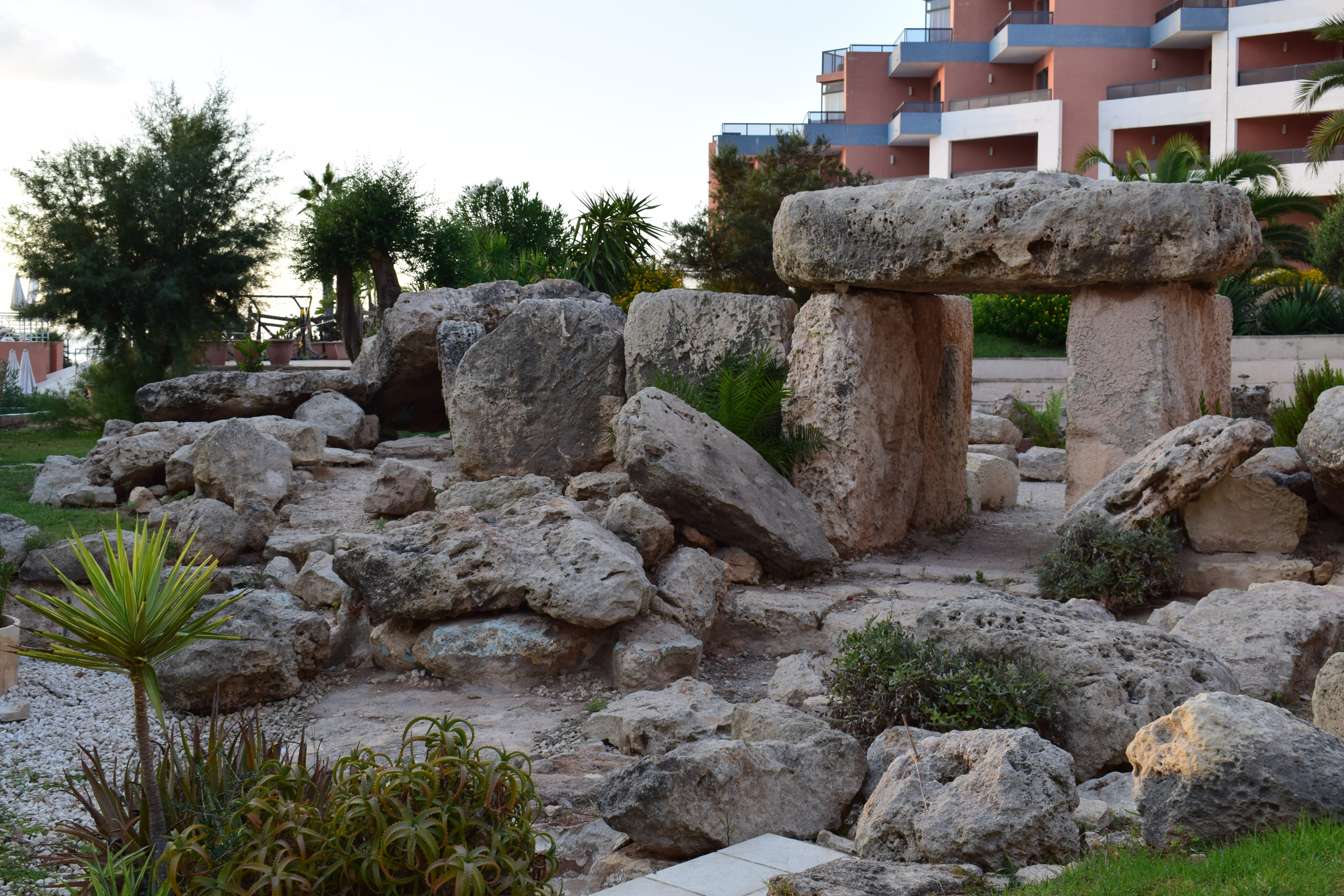
Bugibba Temple

The Buġibba Temple was discovered by Maltese archaeologist Themistocles Zammit in 1925 when he discovered large stones in a field close to Qawra Point. These remains were included on the Antiquities List of 1925, as "the megalithic remains on the side of the road to Qawra point". The temple was excavated in 1928 by Zammit and L. J. Upton Way, and was again surveyed in 1952. Two years later, in 1954, some minor excavations were made to ascertain the chronology of the temple.

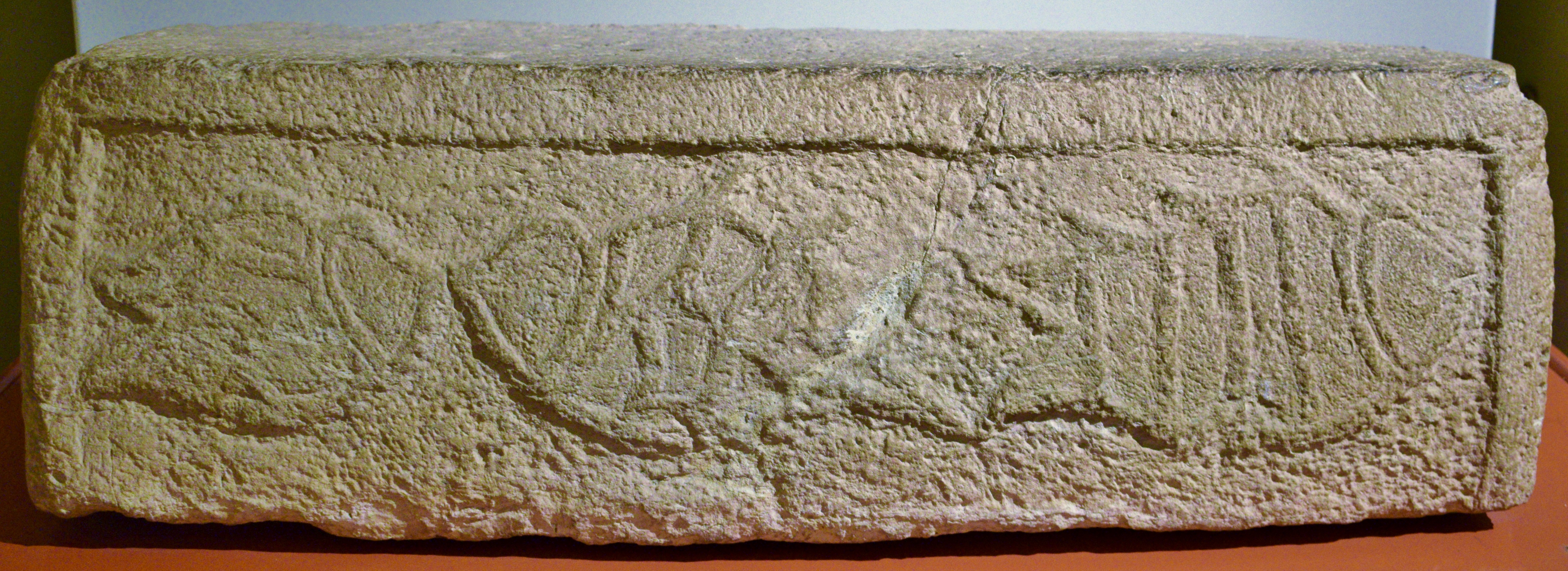
The decorated stone with fish forms

During the excavations, two decorated stone blocks were found. One is a carved square block that was an altar, and the other is a rectangular block with carved fish on two of its faces. These blocks are now in the National Museum of Archaeology in Valletta.

The temple's capstone was also replaced in modern times.

Eventually, the Dolmen Resort Hotel was built around the temple, which was incorporated into the grounds of the hotel close to its swimming pools.
