= Perellos Redoubt =

Defunct defensive structure in Malta

- Ridott ta' Perellos
- St. Paul's Bay, Malta

Site information
- Type: Redoubt
- Owner: Government of Malta

Location
- Coordinates: 35°56′58.1″N 14°25′24.6″E

Site history
- Built: 1715–1716
- Built by: Order of Saint John
- Materials: Limestone
- Fate: Demolished after World War II

Perellos Redoubt (Maltese: Ridott ta' Perellos) was a redoubt in Salina Bay, limits of St. Paul's Bay, Malta. It was built by the Order of Saint John in 1715-1716 as one of a series of coastal fortifications around the coasts of the Maltese Islands. It was demolished after the Second World War.

== History ==
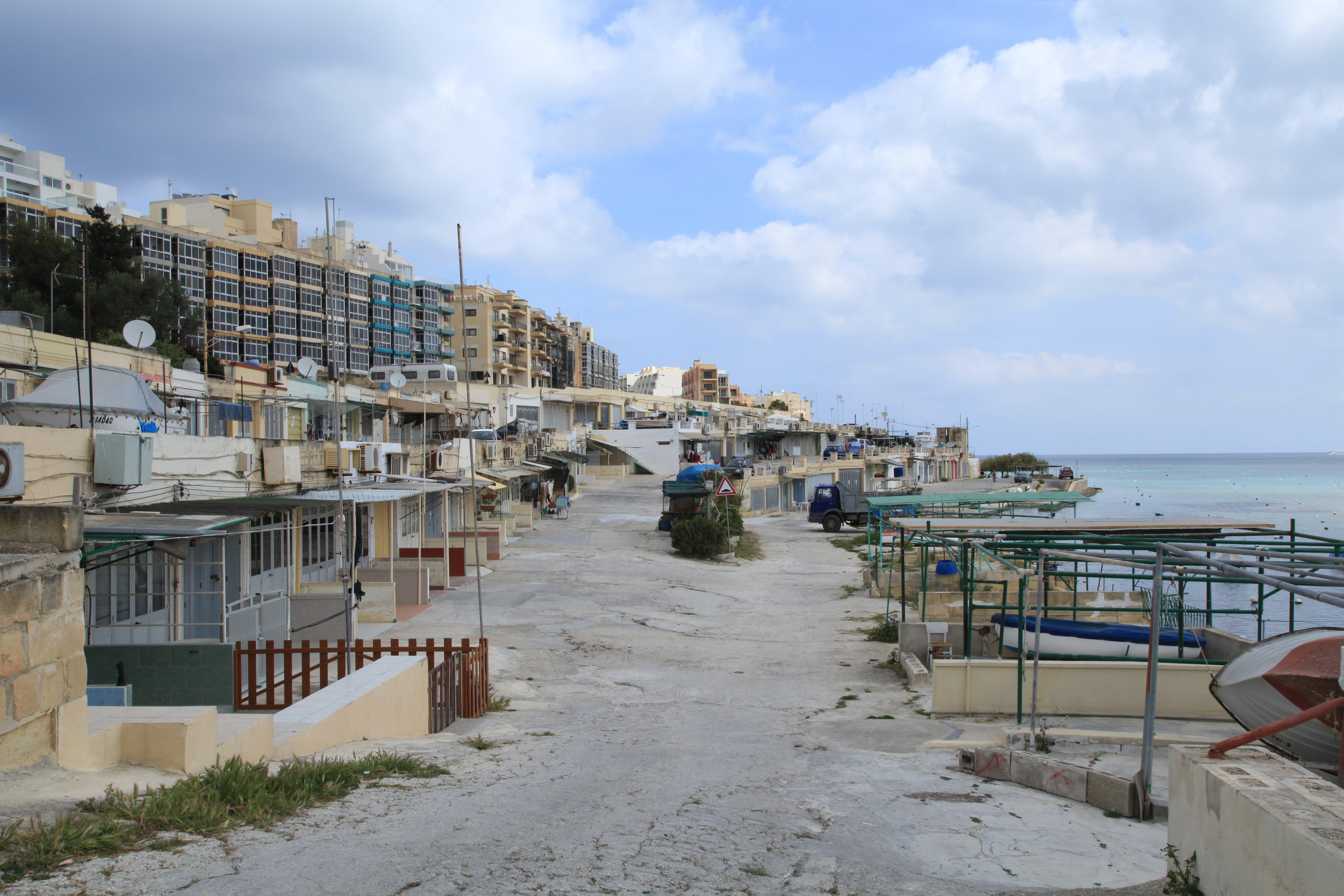
Boathouses built on the site of the redoubt

Perellos Redoubt was built in 1715 and 1716 as part of the Order of Saint John's first building program of coastal fortifications. It was one of two redoubts defending Salina Bay. The redoubt on the other side of the bay, known as Ximenes Redoubt, is still intact.

The redoubt was named after Grand Master Ramon Perellos y Roccaful. The redoubt consisted of a pre-existing mandrague which was converted into a blockhouse, and a rectangular enclosure with a high parapet wall designed to protect infantrymen. The latter was similar to the design of Ximenes Redoubt, but it also had a small bastion on a corner of its perimeter wall.

After 1741, a fougasse was built inside the redoubt. In 1785 it did not have any armament, equipment or munitions.

A concrete beach post was built over the remains of the redoubt in World War II. The remains were demolished after the war, and the site of the redoubt is now occupied by boat houses. The fougasse possibly still exists buried under these boat houses.
