= Arrias Battery =

Artillery battery in Xemxija, Malta

- Batterija ta' Arrias
- Xemxija, St. Paul's Bay, Malta
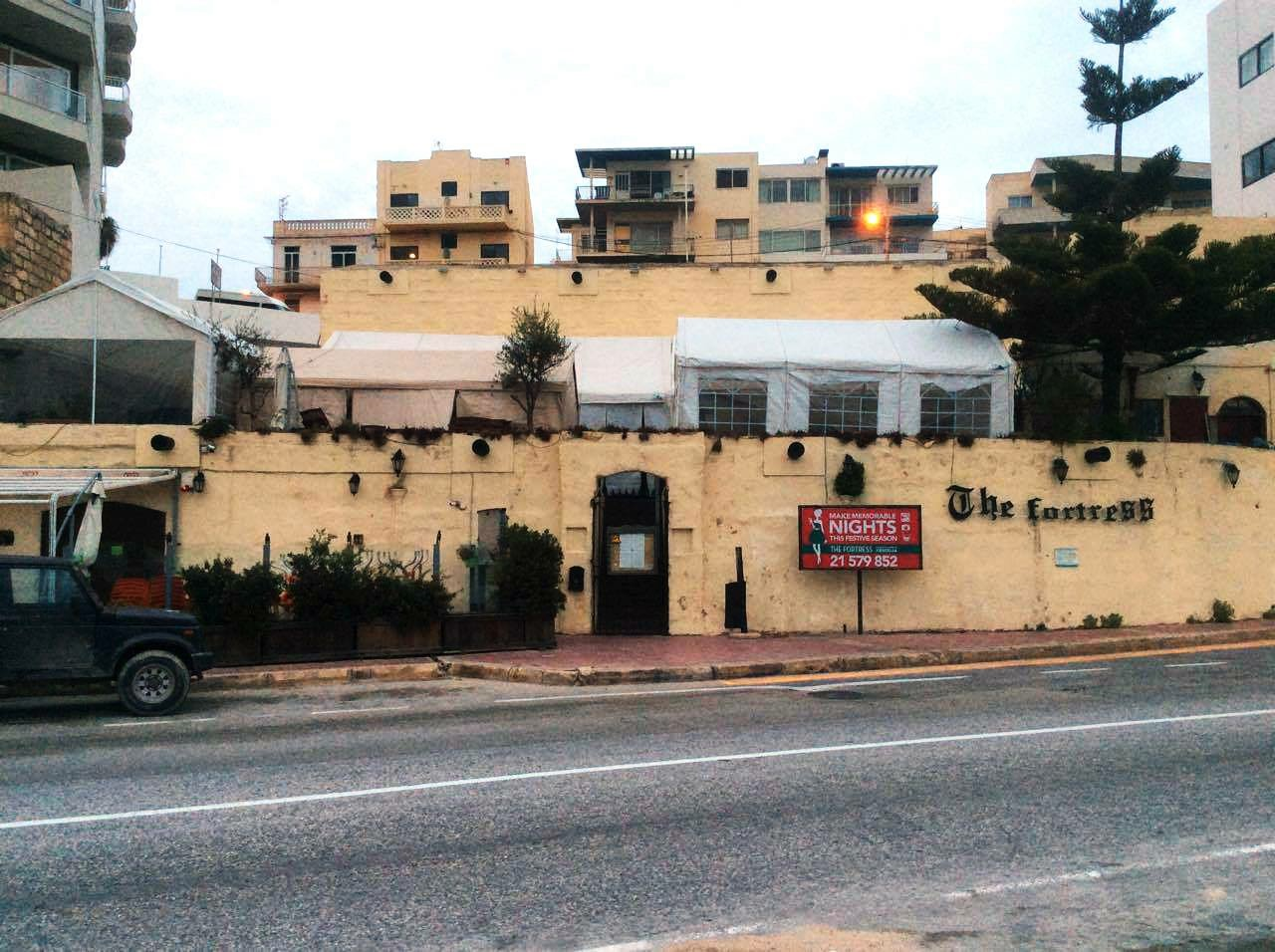
- Arrias Battery is now a restaurant called The Fortress

Site information
- Type: Artillery battery (Note: Sometimes described as a redoubt.)
- Owner: Government of Malta
- Controlled by: The Fortress Wine & Dine
- Open to the public: Yes (as a restaurant)
- Condition: Intact with modern alterations

Location
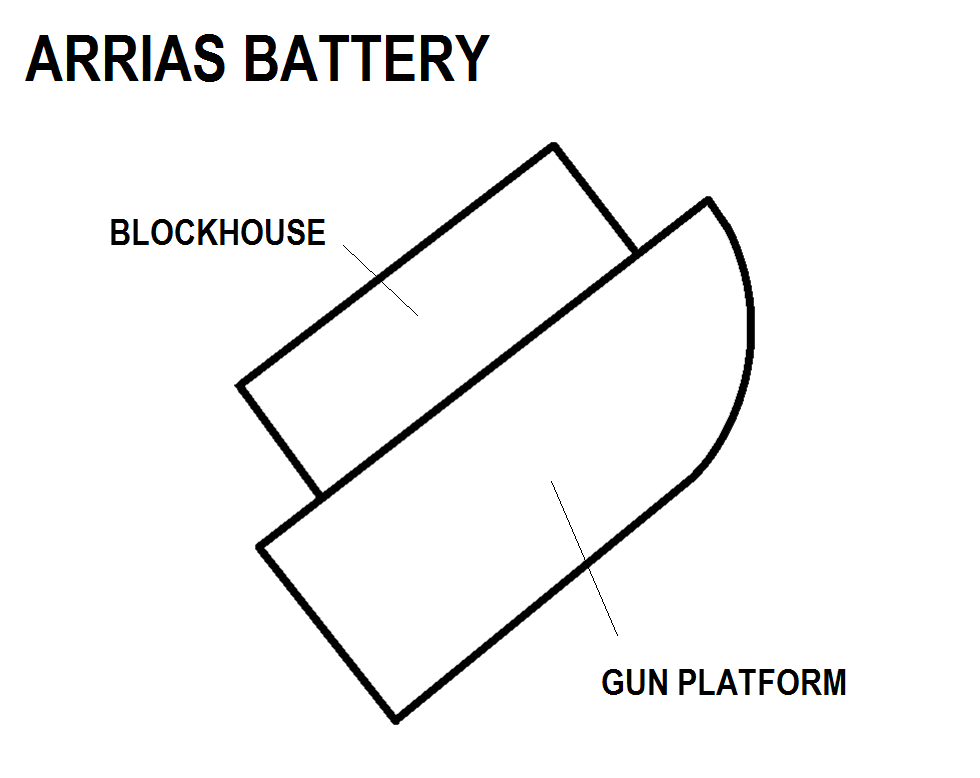
- Map of Arrias Battery in its original configuration
- Coordinates: 35°56′50.8″N 14°22′58.7″E

Site history
- Built: 1715–1716
- Built by: Order of Saint John
- Materials: Limestone

Arrias Battery (Maltese: Batterija ta' Arrias), also known as Xemxija Battery (Maltese: Batterija tax-Xemxija) or Pwales Left Battery (Maltese: Batterija tax-Xellug tal-Pwales), is an artillery battery in Xemxija, limits of St. Paul's Bay, Malta. It was built by the Order of Saint John in 1715–1716 as one of a series of coastal fortifications around the Maltese Islands. The battery still exists, although it has modern alterations, and it is used as a restaurant.

== History ==
Arrias Battery was built in 1715–1716 as part of the Order of Saint John's first building programme of batteries and redoubts around the coasts of Malta. It was one of two batteries defending Xemxija Bay, the other being the now-demolished Dellia Battery.

The battery originally consisted of a mostly rectangular platform with a rounded end at the north. It had a low parapet with one embrasure, and the gorge was closed off by a rectangular blockhouse. The battery was named after the knight Emmanuele Arrias, and an inscription commemorating him is located above the main entrance.

The battery eventually became a summer residence of the Borg Cardona family. They called it ix-Xemxija, and later the area around it began to be referred to by that name.

== Present day ==
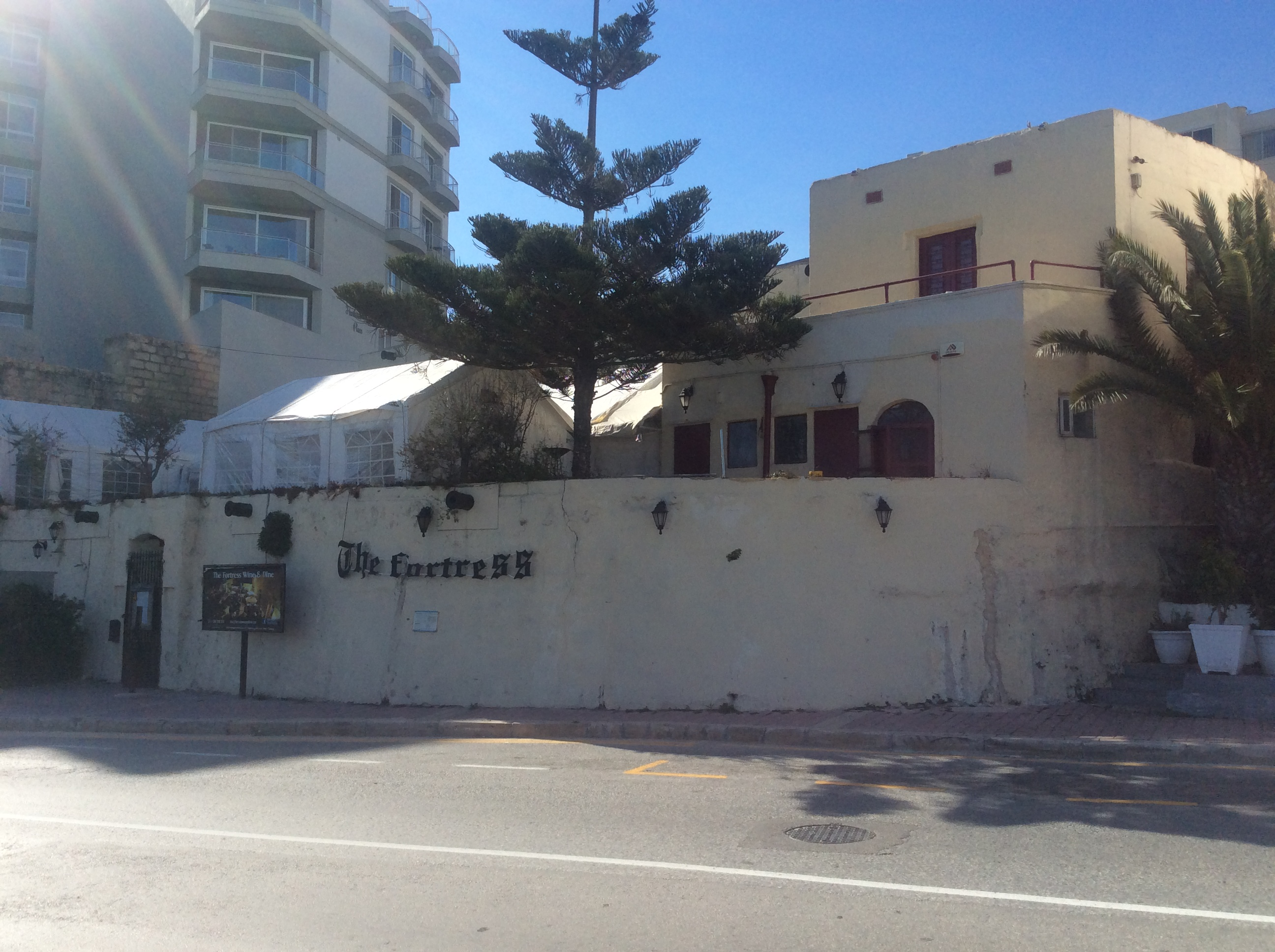
View of the battery showing the rounded end of the gun platform

The battery still exists, but several alterations have been made to the structure, mostly during the course of the 20th century. These include a second-floor added to the blockhouse and a flight of steps leading to an entrance facing the sea.

The battery is now used as a restaurant, known as The Fortress Wine & Dine. It is a Grade 1 national monument, and it is also listed on the National Inventory of the Cultural Property of the Maltese Islands.
