= Xemxija =

Xemxija Ix-Xemxija
- Town
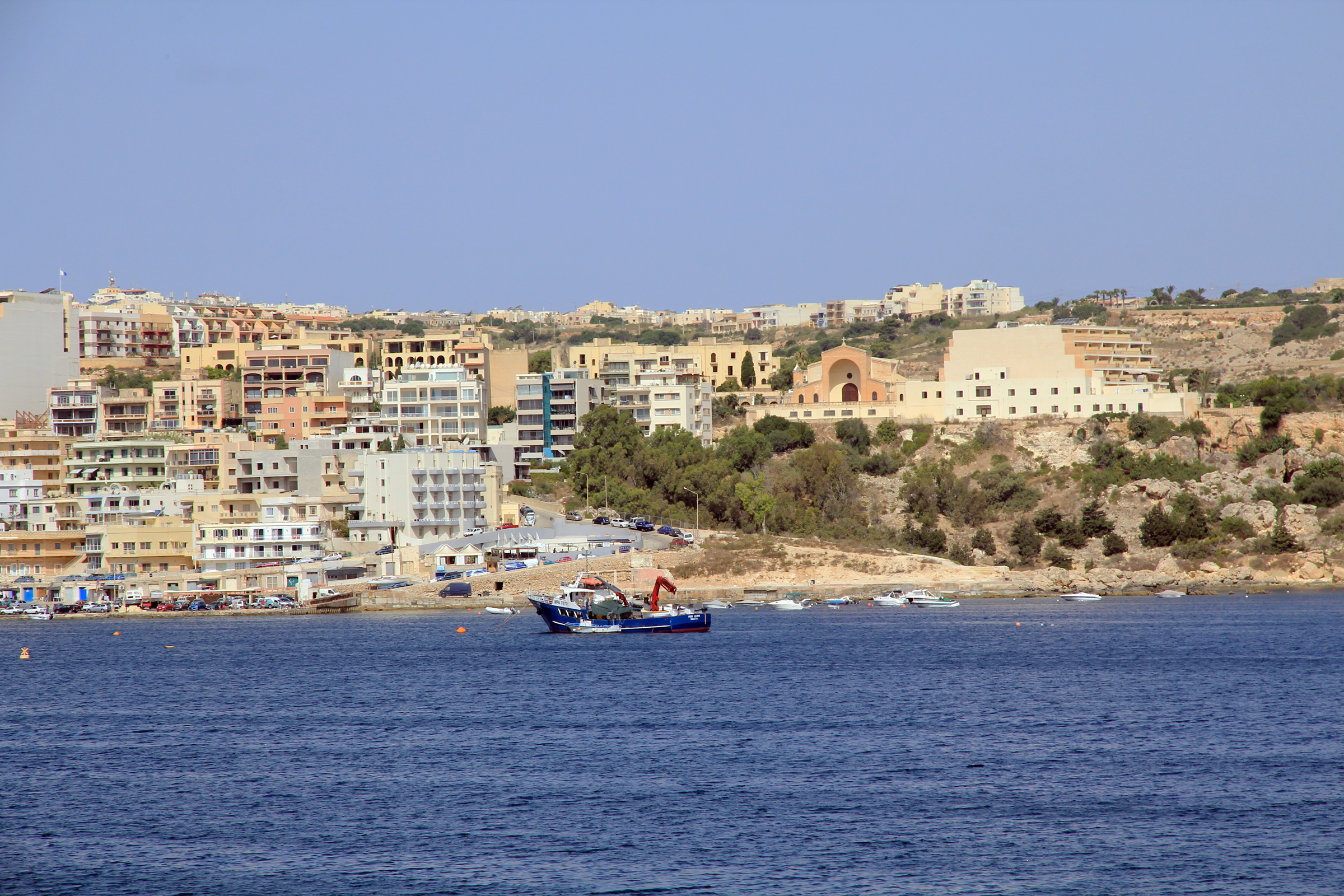
- View of Xemxija with the parish church

- Location within Malta
- Coordinates: 35°57′2″N 14°23′9″E
- Country: Malta
- Region: Northern Region
- District: Northern District
- Local council: St. Paul's Bay
- Time zone: UTC+1 (CET)
  - Summer (DST): UTC+2 (CEST)
- Postal code: SPB
- Dialing code: 356

Xemxija (Maltese: Ix-Xemxija, pronounced shem-shee-ya) is a suburb in the western part of St. Paul's Bay in the Northern Region of Malta. It is surrounded by countryside and contains two bays, the titular Xemxija Bay and Mistra Bay, located just north of the parish church. There are a number of hotels and restaurants in Xemxija.

== History ==
The area around Xemxija has been inhabited since prehistoric times. It contains a number of archaeological sites which now form a heritage trail. These include a number of rock-hewn tombs, remains of two megalithic temples, a Bronze Age grain silo, troglodytic dwellings, cart ruts, a Roman road, and Roman apiaries.

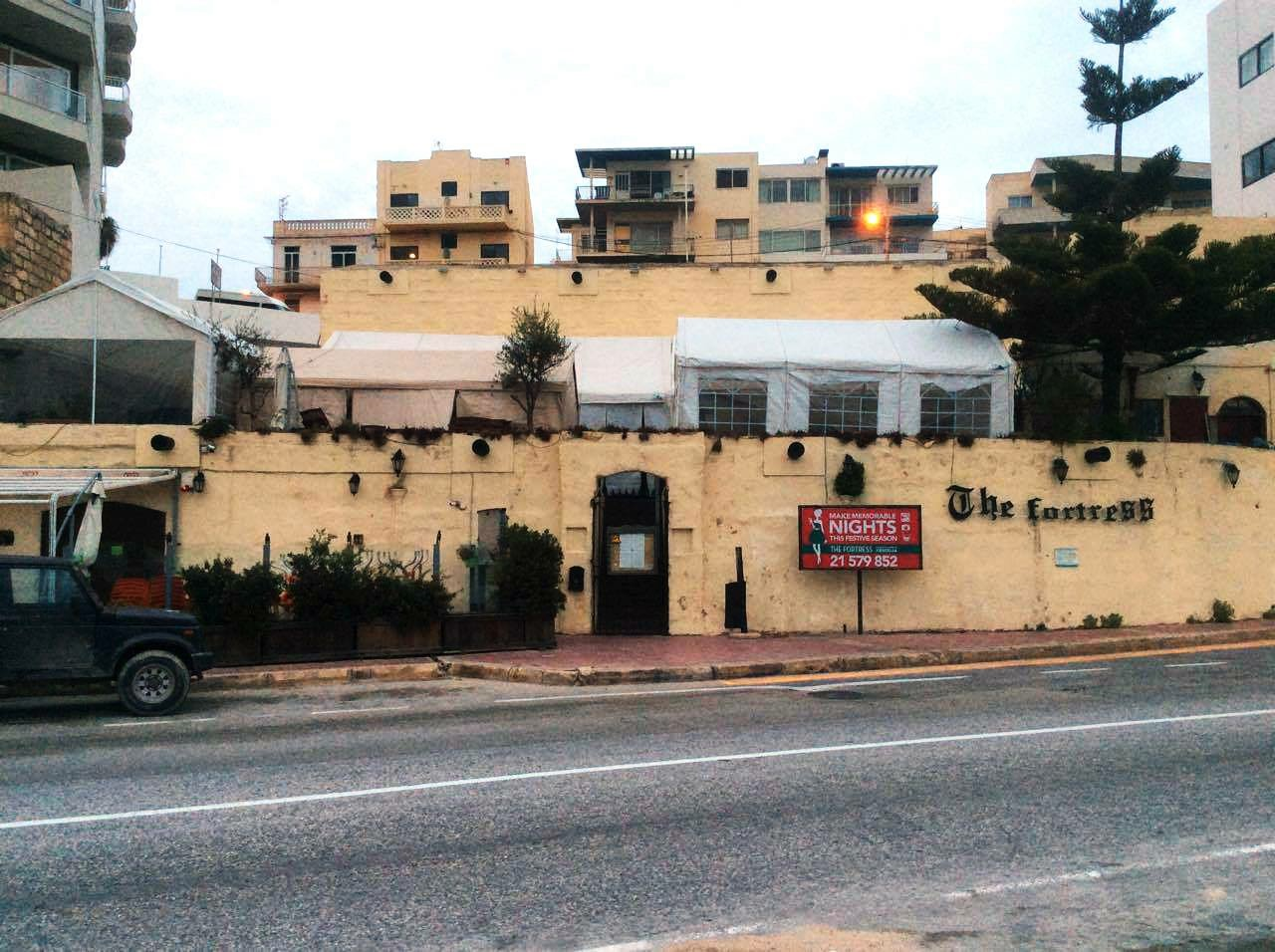
The Arrias Battery (top) and the Xemxija Aqueduct (bottom)

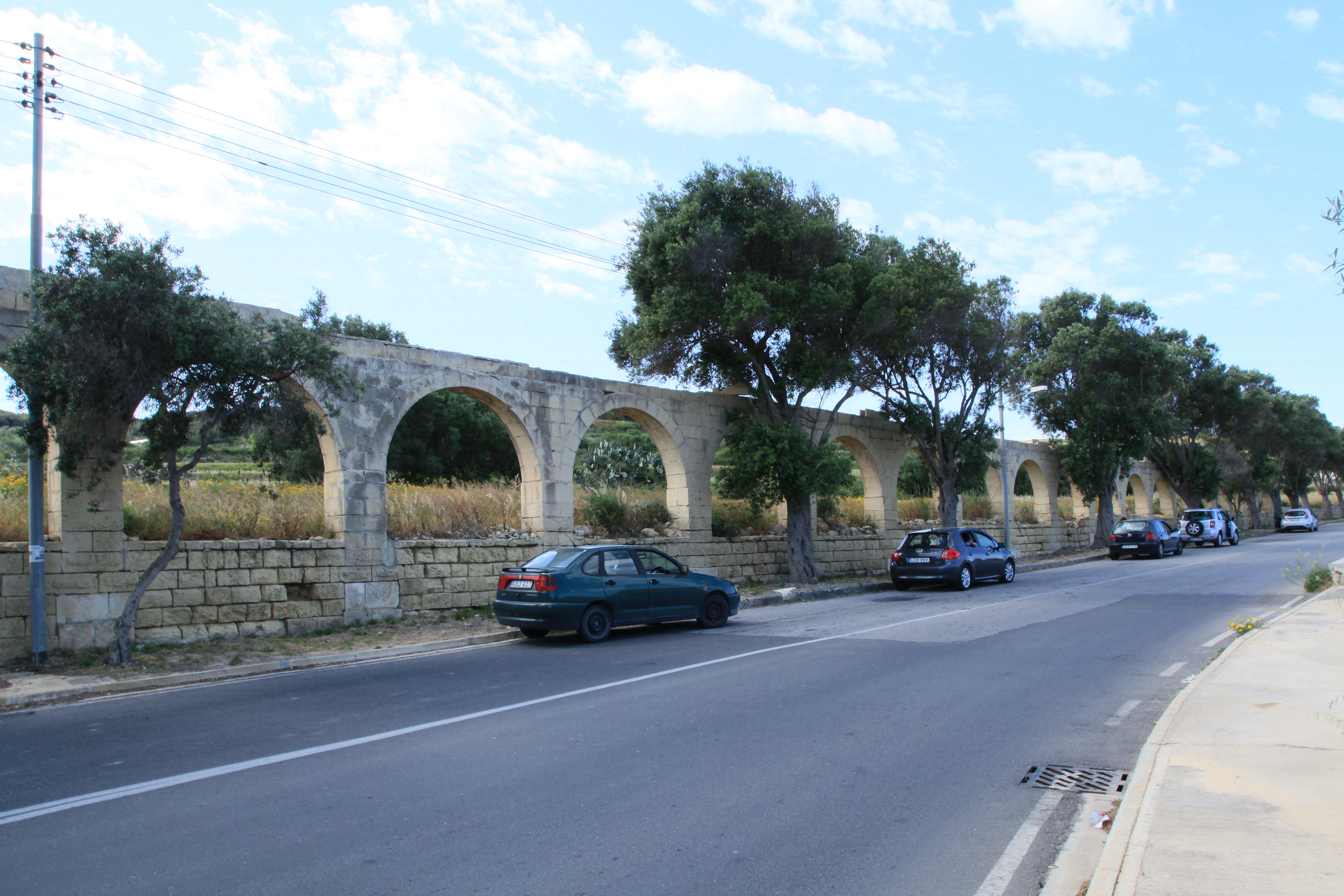

Around 1715, the Order of St. John built Arrias Battery as part of a series of fortifications defending Malta's coastline. It was also called Xemxija Battery since it was on the sunny side of the bay (xemxija means "sunny" in Maltese), and the area around it became known as Xemxija. Today, the battery is a restaurant.

In 1839, the British built an aqueduct to allow the transportation of water. The water travelled from an underground aqueduct in an area in Wardija, known as tal-Ballut, which extends to an above-ground aqueduct and then to a reservoir, both in Xemxija. The conservation of water was needed for the British military and their horses, who surveyed the area from the nearby defence posts.

An underground emergency flour mill was built in Xemxija during the Cold War. It has been restored to working condition by the Fondazzjoni Wirt Industrijali Malti (Maltese Industrial Heritage Foundation), and is now open to the public.

Since the 1980s, several apartment blocks have been built in Xemxija, making it a popular residential area. It is also a small resort, mainly catering with bars and restaurants.

The Simar Nature Reserve forms part of the suburb. A fire and rescue station is located in Xemxija, known as the Xemxija Fire Station.
