= Qawra =

Qawra Il-Qawra
- Town
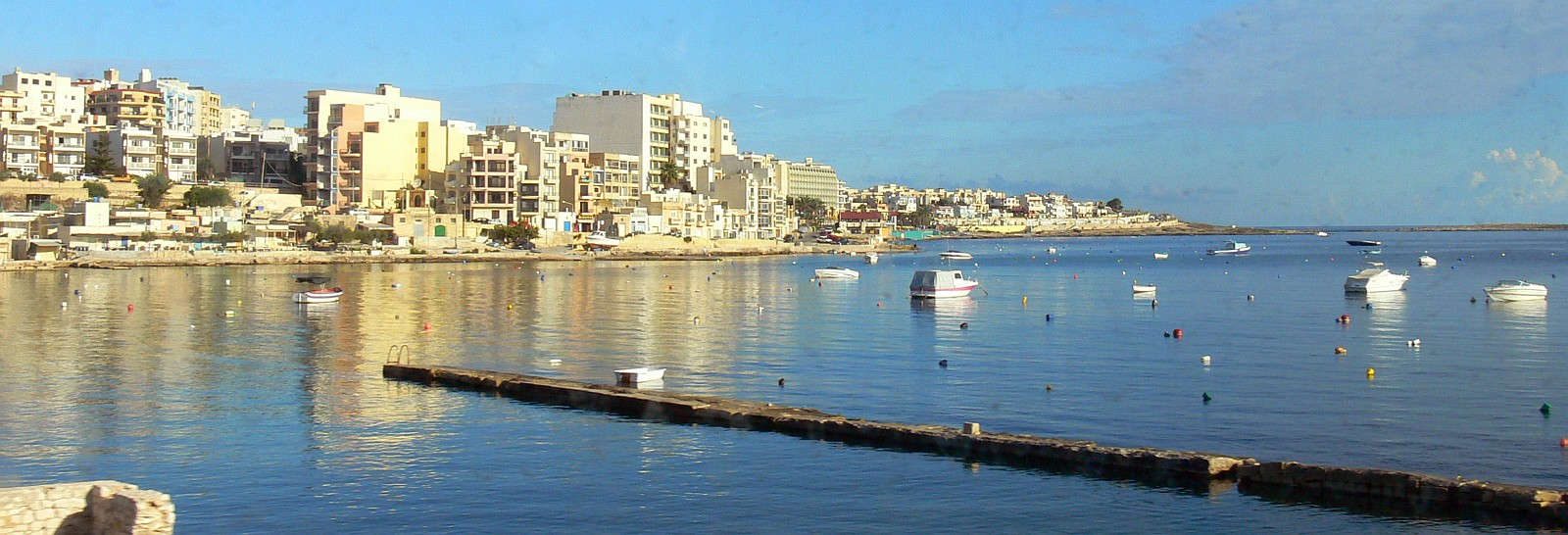
- View of Qawra from Salina Bay

- Location within Malta
- Coordinates: 35°57′15″N 14°25′12″E
- Country: Malta
- Region: Northern Region
- District: Northern District
- Local council: St. Paul's Bay
- Demonym(s): Qawri (m), Qawrija (f), Qawrin (pl)
- Time zone: UTC+1 (CET)
  - Summer (DST): UTC+2 (CEST)
- Postal code: SPB
- Dialing code: 356
- Patron saint: Francis of Assisi

Qawra (Maltese: Il-Qawra, pronounced [ɪlˈʔɐʊ̯rɐ]) is a zone within St. Paul's Bay in the Northern Region, Malta. Located close to Buġibba and Salina, it is a popular tourist resort, containing many hotels and restaurants.

Around 1638, the Order of St. John built Qawra Tower at Qawra Point, as part of a series of fortifications defending Malta's coastline. A battery was built around it in 1715, while an entrenchment wall was added in the 1760s. Today, the tower and battery are a restaurant, and parts of the entrenchment can still be seen.

The town is home to many water-sport activities, including banana boat, speed boat and jetski rides, as well as kayaking, snorkeling and diving. The area is also well known as the "touristy" area of Malta due to the many bars which show British football. Summer temperatures can be as hot as 40 °C (104 °F), with an average of over 30 °C (86 °F). Casinos, bars, and clubs are also a major part of this small town. Many people swim and bathe off the rocks, which provide ample space for sunbathing. It is popular with tourists who like to walk by the sea at night.

== Parish ==
The parochial church of Qawra is dedicated to St Francis of Assisi. The parish incorporates both Qawra and the neighbouring locality of Bugibba in its geographical area. The parish feast is celebrated on 17 September, commemorating the impression of the stigmata on Saint Francis. The church in Qawra began functioning as a parish on 8 December 2004, and the first parish priest was Fr. Ġorġ Zammit, OFM Conv. The architect of the church building was Richard England. It is a modern-style church, unlike the Latin cross style found in most other parishes in Malta.

== Sightseeing ==
The main attractions in Qawra include:

- Malta National Aquarium
- Malta Classic Car Museum
- Buġibba Temple is located on the border of Qawra and Buġibba
