= Buġibba =

- Town
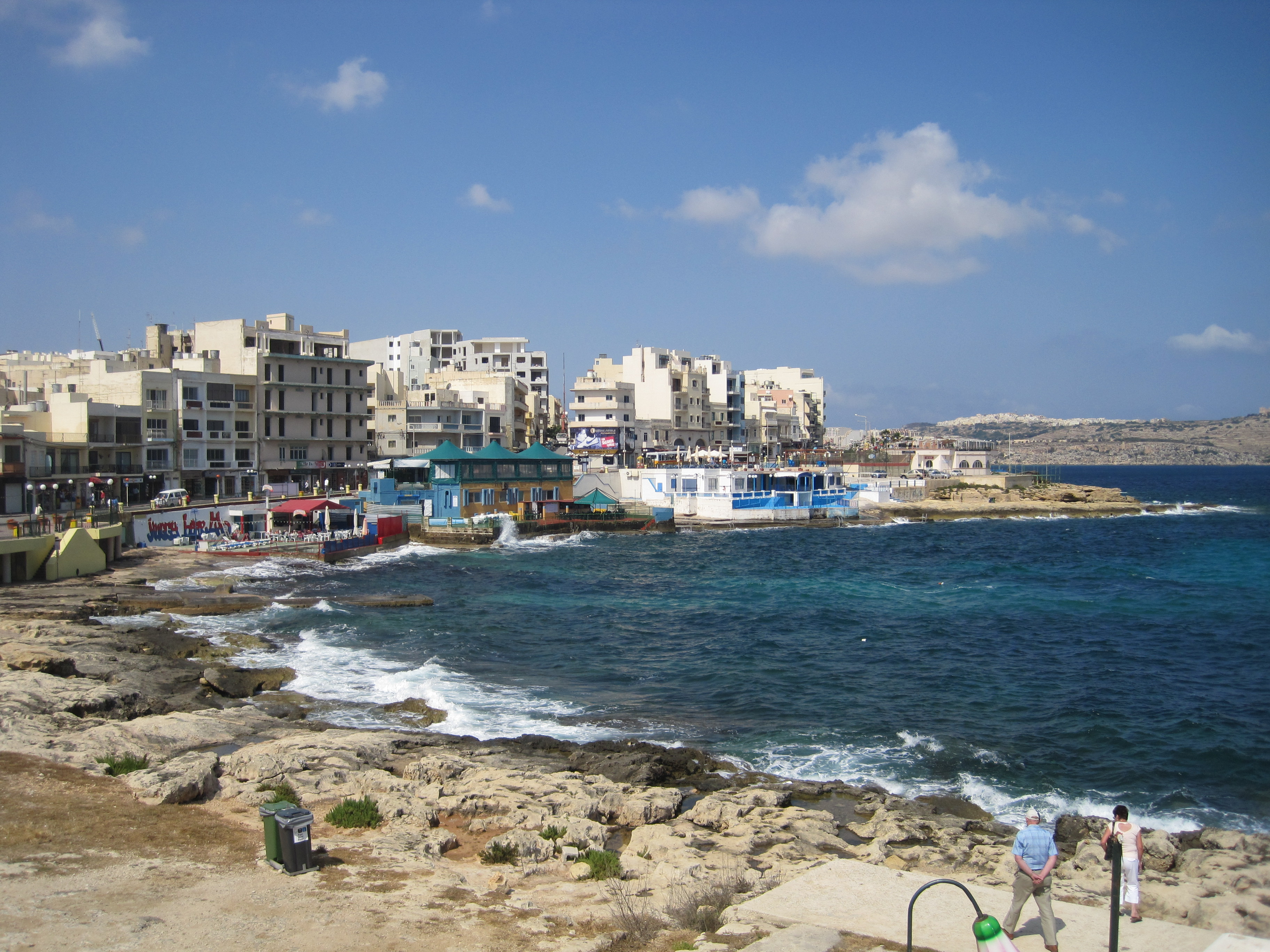
- View of Buġibba

- Location within Malta
- Coordinates: 35°56′57″N 14°24′42″E
- Country: Malta
- Region: Northern Region
- District: Northern District
- Local council: St. Paul's Bay
- Time zone: UTC+1 (CET)
  - Summer (DST): UTC+2 (CEST)
- Postal code: SPB
- Dialing code: 356

Buġibba (English pronunciation: /buːˈdʒɪbə/) is a zone within St. Paul's Bay in the Northern Region, Malta. Situated adjacent to Qawra, it is a popular tourist resort, containing numerous hotels, restaurants, pubs, night clubs, and a casino.

== History ==
During the Tarxien phase of Maltese prehistory, a small temple was built in what is now Buġibba. The temple was excavated between the 1920s and 1950s and is now located in the grounds of a hotel.

Around 1715, the Order of St. John built Buġibba Battery as part of a series of fortifications defending Malta's coastline. Today, only the remains of its foundations and ditch survive.

In the 1960s, Buġibba began to see rapid development and is now a popular tourist resort. It is especially popular among students who go to Malta to learn English. The town's main highlight is its square, which is located along the promenade. The area is full of nightclubs, bars, and restaurants.

== Ferry Services ==
In July 2025, a new ferry terminal and breakwater were inaugurated in Buġibba to support the planned fast ferry route linking Sliema, Buġibba, and Mġarr. The service is expected to launch by late August 2025, and travel between Buġibba and Sliema will be free for Tal-Linja card holders, while trips to Gozo will require a fare.
