= St. Paul's Bay =

Saint Paul's Bay San Pawl il-Baħar
- Local council
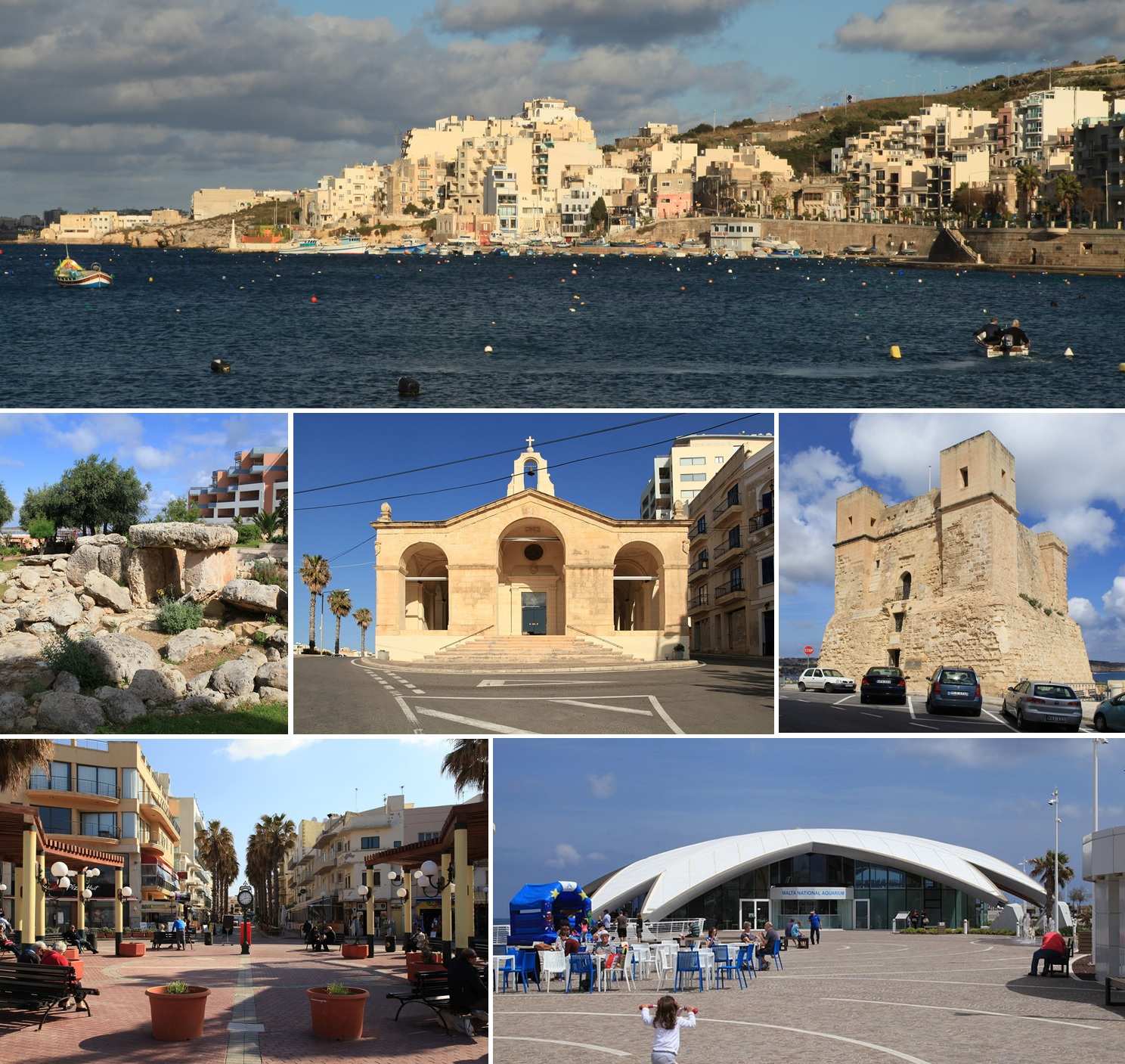
- From top, left to right: skyline, Buġibba Temple, St. Paul's Shipwreck Church, Wignacourt Tower, Buġibba square, Malta National Aquarium

- Flag Coat of arms
- Motto: In Christo Renati Sumus (Born again in Christ)
- Coordinates: 35°56′54″N 14°24′6″E
- Country: Malta
- Region: Northern Region
- District: Northern District
- Borders: Mellieħa, Mġarr, Mosta, Naxxar

Government
  - Mayor: Ċensu Galea (PN)

Area
  - Total: 14.47 km^{2} (5.59 sq mi)

Population (Jul 2024)
  - Total: 38,844
  - Density: 2,684/km^{2} (6,953/sq mi)
- Population exceeds 60,000 in summer
- Demonym(s): Pawlin (m), Pawlina (f), Pawlini (pl)
- Time zone: UTC+1 (CET)
  - Summer (DST): UTC+2 (CEST)
- Postal code: SPB
- Dialing code: 356
- ISO 3166 code: MT-51
- Patron saints: Our Lady of Sorrows; Sacred Heart of Mary; St. Francis of Assisi
- Website: Official website

Saint Paul's Bay (Maltese: San Pawl il-Baħar) is a town located on the northeast coast of Malta in the Northern Region. It is a major residential and commercial area and a centre for shopping, bars, dining, and café life. According to the 2021 census, St. Paul's Bay is the most populated settlement in the country.

Its name refers to the shipwreck of Saint Paul as documented in the Acts of the Apostles on St. Paul's Islands near St Paul's Bay, on his voyage from Caesarea to Rome, which laid the foundations of Christianity on the island.

Burmarrad, Wardija, Qawra, Buġibba, Xemxija, and San Martin, as well as parts of Bidnija and Mistra, form part of St. Paul's Bay Local Council. The area of the locality is 14.47 km^{2} (6 sq mi).

The population of St. Paul's Bay was 38,844 in July 2024. This included 22,315 males and 16,529 females; 14,947 Maltese nationals and 23,897 foreign nationals. This nearly doubles, going up to about 60,000, between June and September with Maltese residents and tourists lodging in hotels, especially in Buġibba and Qawra. Heading north is Mistra Bay, its headland and St Paul's Island. Going west and crossing the island towards Ġnejna Bay and Golden Bay is the scenic Wardija Ridge.

== History ==
Archaeological remains have been found within the limits of St. Paul's Bay dating back to around 4000 BC. Among the remains are the megalithic temples of Buġibba and Xemxija. In addition, cart ruts were found on Wardija Ridge at Busewdien, while Punic tombs and other Bronze Age remains were also discovered. During the Roman period, St. Paul's Bay became an important harbour. Remains of a Roman road, baths, and beehives have been found at Xemxija, while Roman anchors have also been found on the seabed.

By the late Middle Ages, St. Paul's Bay was abandoned since the area was unsafe due to corsair raids. The local militia maintained several watch posts in the area. One of these, known as Ta' Tabibu farmhouse, still survives today and is considered to be the oldest building in St. Paul's Bay. A church building was also noted at the arrival of the Order of St John in 1530.

A number of fortifications were built in the area during the rule of the Order of Saint John. The first of these was the Wignacourt Tower, built in 1610, which is now the oldest surviving watchtower in Malta. Qawra Tower was built by Grand Master Lascaris in 1638. In 1715, batteries were built around these two towers, while two batteries and a redoubt were built in other parts of the St. Paul's Bay coastline. Of these, only Arrias Battery survives today, since Dellia Battery and Perellos Redoubt were demolished in the 20th century.

The bay was one of the landing places during the French invasion of Malta in June 1798. After the Maltese uprising against the French, St. Paul's Bay became the main harbour of Malta since the Grand Harbour and Marsamxett were still under French control.

In the 19th century, several villas were built in St. Paul's Bay. These were requisitioned by the British military during World War II, and the bay became a rest camp. After the Italian armistice of 1943, 76 ships of the Regia Marina were anchored at St. Paul's Bay after surrendering to the British.

After the war, the area began to be further developed. Today, St. Paul's Bay, Qawra, Buġibba, Xemxija, and Burmarrad form a large cluster of buildings. The area is a popular entertainment spot.

== Crime ==
As of 2020, St. Paul's Bay has the largest number of reported thefts in Malta, amounting to 423 out of 4,037 thefts, and the largest amount of domestic violence incidents, amounting to 93 out of 1,409.

== Sports ==
- Sirens F.C. football club
- Sirens A.S.C. Waterpolo club
- Malta Young Sailors Club dinghy sailing club

== Twin towns – sister cities ==
Saint Paul's Bay is twinned with:

- Chaum, France
- Agios Pavlos, Greece
- Oroslavje, Croatia
