= Coastline of Malta =

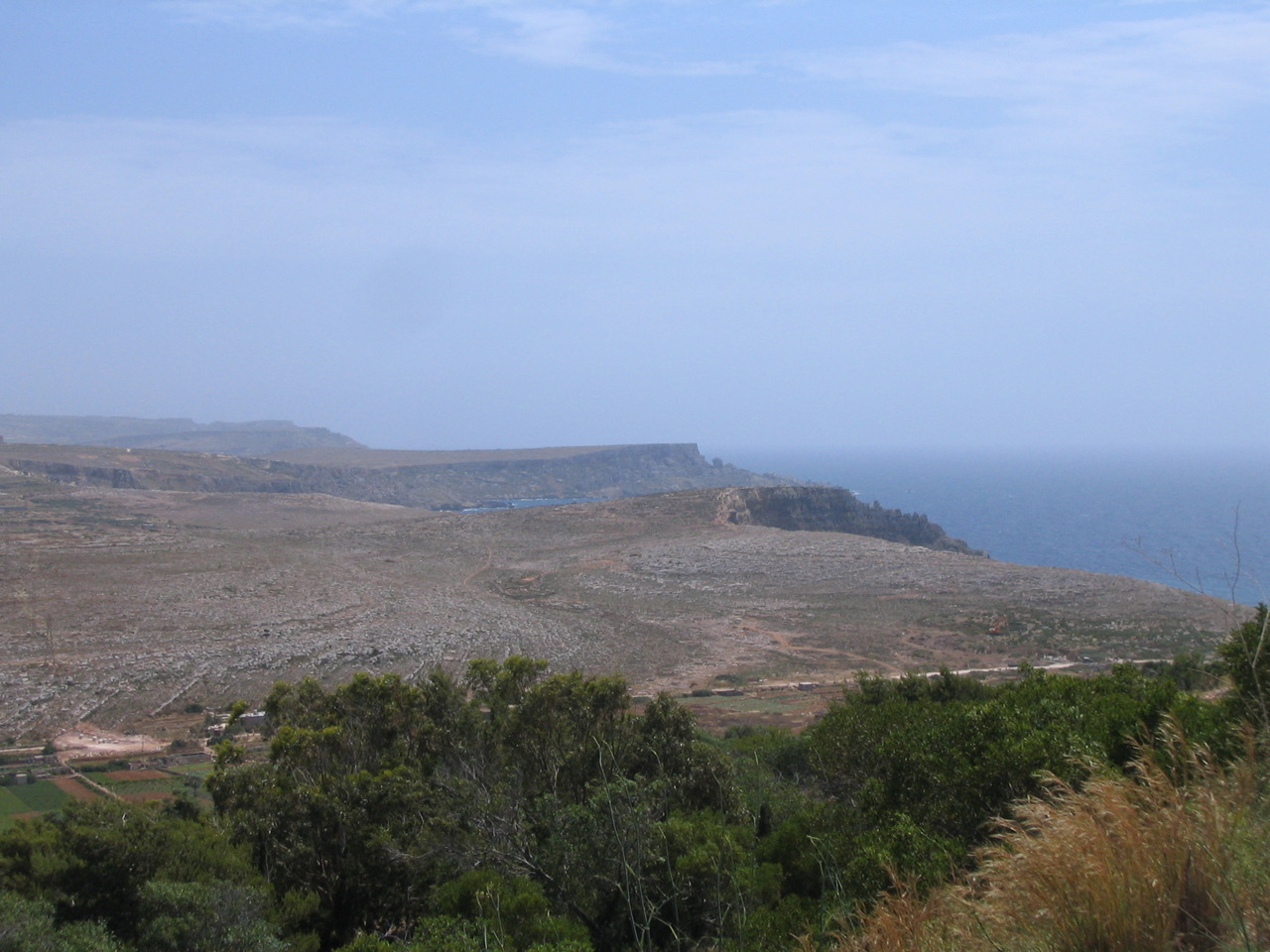
North-western coast of Malta

The coastline of Malta consists of bays, sandy beaches, creeks, harbours, small villages, cities, cliffs, valleys, and other interesting sites. Here, there is a list of these different natural features that are found around the coast of Malta.

== Bays/Beaches ==
- Anchor Bay or (Il-Prajjiet) (Mellieħa)
- Armier Bay or (Il-Bajja tal-Armier) (Mellieħa)
- Bahar ic-Caghaq (Naxxar)
- Bajja San Nikola (Comino)
- Balluta Bay (Bajja tal-Balluta) (San Ġiljan/Sliema)
- Blue Grotto (Qrendi)
- Blue Lagoon (Bejn il-Kmieni) (Comino)
- Daħlet Qorrot (Nadur)
- Delimara (Marsaxlokk)
- Dwejra (San Lawrenz)
- Fomm ir-Riħ (Rabat)
- Font Għadir (Sliema)
- Għadira Bay (Qasam Barrani limits of Mellieħa)
- Għadira Beach (L-Għadira) (Mellieħa)
- Għajn Tuffieħa (Mġarr)
- Għar Lapsi (Siġġiewi)
- Ġnejna Bay (Il-Ġnejna) (Mġarr)
- Golden Bay or Ramla tal-Mixquqa (Mellieħa)
- Ħofra il-Kbira (Marsaskala)
- Ħofra iż-Żgħira (Marsaskala)
- Ħondoq ir-Rummien (Xewkija)
- Inland Sea, Gozo or Qawra (Dwejra)
- Kalanka tal-Patrijiet (Kalkara)
- Marsalforn (Żebbuġ, Gozo)
- Marsaskala Bay or Bajja ta' Wied il-Għajn (Marsaskala)
- Mellieħa Bay (Mellieħa)
- Mgarr ix-Xini (Xewkija)
- Mġiebaħ (Mellieħa)
- Mistra Bay (Qala Mistra) (San Pawl il-Baħar/Mellieħa)
- Paradise Bay (Mellieħa)
- Pretty Bay or Il-Bajja s-Sabiħa (Birżebbuġa)
- Pwales Beach (San Pawl il-Baħar)
- Qalet Marku (Naxxar)
- Qawra Bay (Qawra)
- Qbajjar Bay (Żebbuġ, Gozo)
- Ramla l-Ħamra (Xagħra)
- Ramla ta' Wied Musa (Mellieħa)
- Ramla tal-Bir (Mellieħa)
- Ramla tal-Qortin (Mellieħa)
- Ramla tat-Torri (Mellieħa)
- Rinella Bay (Kalkara)
- Salina Bay (Naxxar/San Pawl il-Baħar)
- San Blas Bay (Nadur)
- San Niklaw Bay (Comino)
- Santa Maria Bay (Comino)
- Selmun Bay (Mellieħa)
- Spinola Bay (San Ġiljan)
- St George's Bay (Birżebbuġa) or Bajja ta' San Ġorġ
- St George's Bay (San Ġiljan)
- St Julian's Bay (San Ġiljan)
- St Paul's Bay or Il-Bajja ta' San Pawl (San Pawl il-Baħar)
- St. Peter's Pool (Marsaxlokk)
- St Thomas' Bay or Ramla taż-Żejtun (Marsaskala/Żejtun)
- Tal-Għażżenin (San Pawl il-Baħar)
- White Rocks or Blata l-Bajda (Pembroke)
- Ix-Xatt l-Aħmar (Għajnsielem)
- Xgħajra Beach (Ix-Xgħajra)
- Ix-Xlendi (Il-Munxar)
- Xrobb l-Għaġin (Marsaxlokk)
- Xwejni Bay (Żebbuġ, Gozo)

== Caves ==
- Bagrat Cave (Mellieħa)
- Cat's Cave (Żurrieq)
- Dorf Cave (Qala)
- Filfla Cave (Żurrieq)
- Għar Bittija (Dingli)
- Għar Għana (Comino)
- Għar Għasfur (San Pawl il-Baħar)
- Għar Ħasan (Birżebbuġa)
- Għar id-Dud (Sliema)
- Għar id-Duħħan (Marsaskala)
- Għar il-Qamħ (Għasri)
- Għar it-Torkija (Fawwara)
- Għar ix-Xagħra (Qrendi)
- Għar Qawqla (Marsalforn)
- Honeymoon Cave; or Għar ta' l-Għarusa (Żurrieq)
- Karolina Cave (Xlendi)
- Reflection Cave; or Għar Ta' Żażu (Żurrieq)

== Cliffs ==
- Bies Cliffs or Rdum il-Bies (Mellieħa)
- Delli Cliffs or Rdum id-Delli (Mellieħa)
- Depiro Cliffs or Rdum Depiro (Dingli)
- Dikkiena Cliffs or Rdum id-Dikkiena (Siġġiewi)
- Dingli Cliffs (Dingli)
- Dun Nazju Cliffs or Rdum Dun Nazju (Dingli)
- Ġebel Ben Ġorġ (Munxar)
- Ħmar Cliffs or Rdum il-Ħmar (Mellieħa)
- Il-Maħruq (San Pawl il-Baħar)
- Majjiesa Cliffs or Rdum Majjiesa (Mellieħa)
- Mdawwar Cliffs or Rdum l-Imdawwar (Mġarr)
- Minkba (Żurrieq)
- Mitquba Cliffs (Għar Lapsi)
- Madonna Cliffs or L-Irdum tal-Madonna (Mellieħa)
- Maħruq Cliffs or Rdum il-Maħruq (San Pawl il-Baħar)
- Qammieħ Cliffs or Rdum il-Qammieħ (Mellieħa)
- Qawwi Cliffs or Rdum il-Qawwi (Mellieħa)
- Rdum il-Kbir (Nadur)
- Rdum l-Abjad (San Pawl il-Baħar)
- Rdum l-Aħmar (Mellieħa)
- Sanap Cliffs or L-Irdum Ta' Sanap (Munxar)
- Sarġ Cliffs or Rdum tas-Sarġ (Rabat, Malta)
- Ta' Bardan Cliffs (Sannat)
- Ta' Ċenċ Cliffs (Sannat)
- Ta' Kililu Cliffs (Xagħra)
- Tal-Gawwija Cliffs (Qrendi)
- Tafal Cliffs (Għajnsielem)
- Vigarju Cliffs (Rabat)
- Xagħra Cliffs or Rdum tax-Xagħra (Xagħra)

== Creeks ==
- Daħlet il-Fekruna (San Pawl il-Baħar)
- Daħlet il-Ħmara
- Daħlet ix-Xilep (Mellieħa)
- Daħlet ix-Xmajjar (Mellieħa)
- Dockyard Creek (Birgu/Bormla/Senglea)
- French Creek (Daħlet il-Franċiżi) (Senglea/Cospicua)
- Il-Fossa (Valletta)
- Il-Magħluq (Marsaxlokk)
- Kalkara Creek (Daħlet il-Kalkara) (Birgu/Kalkara)
- Lazzaretto Creek (Ta' Xbiex/Gżira)
- Marfa (Mellieħa)
- Marsa Creek or Newport (Marsa/Paola)
- Menqa (Marsa)
- Msida Creek (Msida/Pietà/Ta' Xbiex)
- No. 1 Dock (Bormla)
- Pietà Creek (Floriana/Pietà)
- Red China Dock
- Rinella Creek (Daħlet l-Irnella) (Kalkara)
- Sliema Creek (Sliema)
- Ta' Ħammud (Mtaħleb)

== Harbours ==
- Ċirkewwa (Mellieħa)
- Grand Harbour (Valletta/Floriana/Marsa/Paola/Senglea/Bormla/Birgu/Kalkara)
- Malta Freeport (Birżebbuġa)
- Marsamxett Harbour (Valletta/Floriana/Pietà/Msida/Ta' Xbiex/Gżira/Sliema)
- Marsaxlokk Bay (Marsaxlokk/Birżebbuġa)
- Mġarr Port (Għajnsielem)
- Kalafrana (Birżebbuġa)

== Marinas ==
- Bighi Sally Port (Kalkara)
- Cottonera Marina (Ix-Xatt tal-Kottonera) (Birgu)
- Jews Sally Port (Valletta)
- Manoel Island Yacht Marina (Manoel Island/Gżira)
- Menqa (Marsalforn)
- Mġarr Yacht Marina (Għajnsielem)
- Msida Yacht Marina (Msida/Pietà)
- Portomaso (San Ġiljan)

== Points ==
- Aħrax Point (Mellieħa)
- Delimara Point (Marsaxlokk)
- Dragonara Point (San Ġiljan)
- Dwejra Point (San Lawrenz)
- Forna Point (Għasri)
- Għallis Point (Naxxar)
- Għemieri (Comino)
- Griebeġ Point (Mellieħa)
- Gżira Point (Marsaskala)
- Ħeqqa Point (Għarb)
- Il-Kullana (Fawwara)
- L-Ilsna (Qrendi)
- Maħrax Point
- Marfa Point (Mellieħa)
- Mellieħa Point (Għajnsielem)
- Mgerbeb Point
- Miġnuna Point (Marsaskala)
- Miġnuna Point, Mistra (Mellieħa)
- Munxar Point (Marsaskala)
- Parsott (Mellieħa)
- Pellegrin Point (Mġarr)
- Pinu Point (Għarb)
- Ponta l-Kbira
- Ras Ħanżir (Paola)
- Ras id-Dawwara (Rabat)
- Ras il-Bajda (Xlendi)
- Ras il-Bajjada (Wied iż-Żurrieq)
- Ras il-Ġebel (Xgħajra)
- Ras il-Ħamrija (Qrendi)
- Ras il-Ħobż (Għajnsielem)
- Ras il-Waħx (Mellieħa)
- Ras in-Niexfa (Mellieħa)
- Ras ir-Raħeb (Baħrija)
- Ras l-Irqieqa (Pembroke)
- Ras tal-Għemieri
- Reqqa Point (Għasri)
- Ricasoli Point (Kalkara)
- Rxawn Point (Xemxija)
- Qala Point (Qala)
- Qammieħ Point (Mellieħa)
- Qawra Point (San Pawl il-Baħar)
- Qrejten Point (Bahar ic-Caghaq)
- San Dimitri Point (Għarb)
- Santa Maria Point (Marsalforn)
- Senglea Point (Senglea)
- Sliema Point (Sliema)
- Spinola Point (San Ġiljan)
- St. Elmo Point (Valletta)
- St. Julian's Point (Balluta)
- Tal-Merieħa Point
- Tigné Point or Dragutt Point (Sliema)
- Wardija Point (Dwejra)
- Xagga (Siġġiewi)
- Zonqor Point (Il-Ponta taż-Żonqor) (Marsaskala)

== Strands ==
- Bridge Wharf (Il-Moll tal-Pont)(Marsa)
- Bognor Beach (Plajjet Bognor) (San Pawl il-Baħar)
- Coal Wharf (Il-Moll tal-Faħam) (Paola)
- Cospicua Wharf (Ix-Xatt ta' Bormla) (Bormla)
- Gun Wharf (Il-Moll tal-Kanun) (Floriana)
- Gzira Strand (Ix-Xatt tal-Gżira) (Gżira)
- Flagstone Wharf (Il-Moll taċ-Ċangaturi) (Marsa)
- Freeport Wharf (Il-Moll tal-Port Ħieles) (Birżebbuġa)
- Juan B. Azzopardi Strand (Ix-Xatt J.B. Azzopardi) (Senglea)
- Hamilton Wharf (Xatt Hamilton) (Senglea)
- Hay Wharf (Xatt it-Tiben) (Floriana)
- Kalkara Strand (Ix-Xatt tal-Kalkara) (Kalkara)
- Lascaris Wharf (Ix-Xatt Lascaris) (Floriana)
- Moll tal-Braken (Marsa)
- Moll tal-Knisja (Marsa)
- Msida Strand (Ix-Xatt tal-Imsida) (Msida)
- Pinto Wharf (Ix-Xatt Pinto) (Floriana)
- Quarries Wharf (Xatt il-Barrieri) (Valletta)
- Qui-Si-Sana Strand (Ix-Xatt ta' Qui-Si-Sana) (Sliema)
- Shipwrights Wharf (Moll ix-Shipwrights) (Paola)
- Somerset Wharf (Moll Somerset) (Bormla)
- Spinola Strand (Triq Spinola) San Ġiljan
- Ta' Xbiex Strand (Ix-Xatt ta' Ta' Xbiex) (Ta' Xbiex)
- Tigne' Strand (Ix-Xatt ta' Tigné) (Sliema)
- Valletta Waterfront (Ix-Xatt tal-Belt) (Floriana)
- Wine Wharf (Xatt l-Għassara tal-Għeneb) (Marsa)
- Xatt il-Birgu (Birgu)
- Xatt il-Forn (Birgu)
- Xatt il-Laboratorju (Paola)
- Xatt il-Mollijiet (Marsa)
- Xatt ir-Risq (Birgu)
- Xatt is-Sajjieda (Marsaxlokk)
- Xatt iż-Żejt (Birgu)
- Xatt San Ġorġ (Birżebbuġa)
- Xatt Sant' Anġlu (Birgu)
- Xatt ta' San Ġorġ (Paceville)
- Xatt ta' Santa Marija (Mellieħa)
- Xgħajra Strand (Xgħajra)
- Żewwieqaor Xatt l-Imġarr (Għajnsielem)

== Valleys ==
- Wied Babu (Żurrieq)
- Wied Gerżuma (Baħrija)
- Wied Għammieq (Kalkara)
- Wied Ħallelin (Żurrieq)
- Wied Ħoxt (Qrendi)
- Wied il-Buni (Birżebbuġa)
- Wied il-Bussaxa (Żurrieq)
- Wied il-Ghajn (Ħaż-Żabbar)
- Wied il-Għasri (Għasri)
- Wied iż-Żurrieq (Qrendi)
- Wied Mġarr ix-Xini (Xewkija)
- Wied Miġra Ferħa (Rabat, Malta)
- Wied Rini (Rabat)
- Wied ta' Daħlet Qorrot (Qala)
- Wied tal-Ġnejna (Mġarr)
- Wied tal-Kantra (Munxar)
- Wied Żnuber (Birżebbuġa)

== Others ==
- Azure Window (Tieqa Ta' Żerka) (San Lawrenz)
- Barbaġanni Rock or Skoll tal-Barbaġanni (Qala)
- Buxiħ (Fawwara)
- Fessej Rock or Skoll tal-Fessej (Xewkija)
- Fungus Rock (San Lawrenz)
- Ġebel tal-Ħalfa (Qala)
- Ġorf l-Abjad (Żabbar)
- Għaġra s-Sewda (Siġġiewi)
- Għajn Barrani (Xagħra)
- Għajn Ħadid (Selmun)
- Għajn Rasul (San Pawl il-Baħar)
- Għajn Żejtuna (Mellieħa)
- Għallis Rock (Naxxar)
- Iċ-Ċumnija (Mellieħa)
- Iċ-Ċnus (Sannat)
- Il-Blata (Baħrija)
- Il-Ħnejja (Wied iż-Żurrieq)
- Il-Marbat (Mellieħa)
- Il-Mina (Rabat, Malta)
- Is-Sikka (Rabat, Malta)
- L-Irqiqa ta' Kemmuna (Comino)
- Manoel Island (Gżira)
- Migra Ferha (Rabat, Malta)
- Miġra Ilma (Fawwara)
- Mistra Rocks (Nadur)
- Nagħaġ il-Baħar (Għasri)
- North Comino Channel (Fliegu t'Għawdex)
- Qolla l-Bajda (Marsalforn)
- Qrejten
- Sala Rock (Żabbar)
- South Comino Channel (Fliegu ta' Malta)
- Ta' Buleben (Qawra)
- Ta' Ġfien (Dingli)
- Ta' l-Imgħarrqa (Mellieħa)
- Ta' Venuta (Nadur)
- Ta' Xilep (Qala)
- Taċ-Ċawl Rocks or Il-Ġebel taċ-Ċawl (Qala)
- Taħt ix-Xifer
- Taħt iż-Żiemel (Valletta)
- Tar-Riefnu
- Xemxija
- Xwiegħi

== Around the Coast of Malta ==
=== From Tigné Point to Malta Freeport ===
Start from Tigné Point, Sliema, then pass from these strand, coastal roads, and promenades in different sea-side localities around the island.

- Sliema
  - Tigné Point or Dragut Point (Il-Ponta ta' Dragut)
  - Tigné Strand (Ix-Xatt ta' Tignè)
  - The Strand, Sliema (Ix-Xatt, Tas-Sliema) - Sliema Ferry
  - Sliema Creek (Id-Daħla ta' Tas-Sliema)
- Gżira
  - Gżira Strand (Ix-Xatt, il-Gżira) - Gżira Centre
  - Manoel Island
  - Lazzaretto Creek (Id-Daħla ta' Lazzarett)
- Ta' Xbiex
  - Ta' Xbiex Strand (Ix-Xatt ta' Ta' Xbiex) - Ta' Xbiex
- Msida
  - Ta' Xbiex Strand (Ix-Xatt ta' Ta' Xbiex) - Msida Creek
  - Msida Strand (Ix-Xatt tal-Imsida) - Msida Creek
  - Msida Creek (Id-Daħla tal-Imsida)
- Pietà
  - Msida Yacht Marina
  - Pietà Creek (Id-Daħla tal-Pietà)
  - Sa Maison
- Floriana
  - Hay Wharf (Xatt it-Tiben)
  - Sa Maison Bastion (is-Sur ta' Sa Maison)
  - Msida Bastion (Is-Sur tal-Imsida)
  - Quarantine Bastion (Is-Sur tal-Kwarantina)
- Valletta
  - Great Siege Road (Triq l-Assedju l-Kbir) - Marsamxett
  - Marsamxett Road (Triq Marsamxett) - Marsamxett
  - Boat Street (Triq il-Lanċa) - Marsamxett
  - German Curtain (Is-Sur tal-Ġermaniżi) - Marsamxett
  - St. Sebastian Curtain (Is-Sur ta' San Bastjan) - Marsamxett
  - English Curtain (Is-Sur tal-Ingliżi) - Marsamxett
  - Il-Fossa
  - French Curtain (Is-Sur tal-Franċiżi) - Marsamxett
  - St. Gregory's Bastion (Is-Sur ta' San Girgor) - Marsamxett
  - Ball Bastion (Is-Sur ta' Ball) - Fort St. Elmo
  - St. Elmo Point (Il-Ponta ta' Sant' Iermu) - Fort St. Elmo
  - St. Elmo Breakwater (Il-Breakwater ta' Sant' Iermu) - Grand Harbour
  - Abercrombie Bastion (Is-Sur ta' Abercrombie) - Grand Harbour
  - St. Lazarus Bastion (Is-Sur ta' San Lażżru) - Grand Harbour
  - Lower Castile Bastion (Is-Sur ta' Isfel ta' Castile) - Grand Harbour
  - Mgerbeb Point (Il-Ponta tal-Imgerbeb) - Grand Harbour
  - Castile Bastion (is-Sur ta' Castile) - Grand Harbour
  - Barriera Wharf (Xatt il-Barriera) - Grand Harbour
  - St. Barbara Bastion (Is-Sur ta' Santa Barbara) - Grand Harbour
  - Ta' Liesse
  - Lascaris Battery (Is-Sur ta' Lascaris) - Grand Harbour
  - Lascaris Wharf (Xatt Lascaris) - Grand Harbour
- Floriana
  - Pinto Wharf (Xatt ta' Pinto) - Valletta Waterfront
  - Valletta Waterfront
- Marsa
  - Wine Wharf (Xatt l-Għassara tal-Għeneb) - Menqa
  - Mill Street (Triq il-Mitħna) - Menqa
  - Bridge Strand (Xatt il-Pont) - Menqa
  - Flagstone Wharf (Il-Moll taċ-Ċangaturi) - Menqa
  - Firewood Wharf (Il-Moll tal-Ħatab) - Menqa
  - Il-Menqa tal-Braken
  - Moll tal-Braken (Il-Moll tal-Braken) - Menqa
  - Bridge Wharf (Il-Moll tal-Pont) - Menqa
  - Church Wharf (Il-Moll tal-Knisja) - Menqa
  - Wharfs Strand (Xatt il-Mollijiet) - Menqa
  - Dock No. 7 (Baċir Nru. 7) - Menqa
- Paola, Malta
  - Shipwrights Wharf (Il-Moll tax-Shipwrights) - Corradino
  - Coal Wharf (Il-Moll tal-Faħam) - Corradino
  - Ras Ħanżir
  - Corradino Hill (l-Għolja ta' Kordin)
- Bormla
  - Dock No. 6 (Baċir Nru. 6)
  - French Creek (Id-Daħla tal-Franċiżi)
  - Dock No. 5 (Baċir Nru. 5)
  - Dock No. 4 (Baċir Nru. 4)
  - Dock No. 3 (Baċir Nru. 3)
  - Dock No. 2 (Baċir Nru. 2)
- Senglea (L-Isla)
  - Senglea Point (Il-Ponta tal-Isla) - Grand Harbour
  - Juan B. Azopardo Strand (Ix-Xatt Juan B. Azopardo) - Shipbuilding Creek
  - Il-Maċina
- Bormla
  - Shipbuilding Creek (Id-Daħla tat-Tarzna)
  - Cospicua Strand (Ix-Xatt ta' Bormla)
  - Dock No. 1 (Baċir Nru. 1)
  - Dom Mintoff Strand (Triq Dom Mintoff)
- Birgu
  - Vittoriosa Strand (Xatt ir-Risq)
  - Vittoriosa Strand (Ix-Xatt tal-Birgu/Triq l-Assedju l-Kbir, 1565)
  - Fort St. Angelo (Fortizza Sant' Anġlu)
  - It-Toqba
- Kalkara
  - Xewkija Street (Triq ix-Xewkija)
  - Kalkara Creek (Id-Daħla tal-Kalkara)
  - Kalkara Strand (Ix-Xatt) - Kalkara Centre
  - Marina Strand (Triq Marina)
  - Bighi
  - Rinella Bay (Id-Daħla ta' Rinella)
  - Fort Ricasoli (Il-Fortizza ta' Ricasoli)
  - Ricasoli Point
  - Ricasoli Breakwater (Il-Breakwater ta' Ricasoli)
  - Ta' Wied Għammieq
  - Rinella Battery
  - Kalanka tal-Patrijiet
  - Fort St. Roque
  - Tar-Ramel
  - Smart City Malta
  - Taħt il-Ġiebja
- Xgħajra
  - Xgħajra Promanade (Dawret ix-Xatt) - Xgħajra Beach
  - Ta' Talk
  - Tan-Nisa
  - Tal-Qassisin
  - Ras il-Ġebel
  - Blata l-Bajda
  - Il-Golf tal-Blata l-Bajda
  - Ta' Barkat
- Żabbar
  - Il-Golf l-Abjad
  - Is-Swali
  - Il-Golf ta' Xuxetta
  - In-Nwadar
  - Triq il-Wiesgħa Tower
- Marsaskala
  - Żonqor
  - L-Iskoll ta' Sala
  - Għar id-Duħħan
  - Iż-Żellieqa
  - L-Ilsien
  - Żonqor Point (Il-Ponta ta' Żonqor)
  - Għar ix-Xama'
  - Żonqor Road (Triq iż-Żonqor)
  - Ta' Monita
  - St. George's Street (Triq San Ġorġ)
  - Marsaskala Marina (Ix-Xatt)
  - Salini Road (Triq is-Salini)
  - Marsaskala Bay (Il-Bajja ta' Wied il-Għajn)
  - Xifer iċ-Ċerna
  - Ta' Barut Point (Il-Ponta ta' Barut)
  - Il-Mitquba
  - Siberia Point (Il-Gżira)
  - Jerma Bay (Ta' Wara l-Jerma)
  - Miġnuna Point (Il-Ponta tal-Miġnuna)
  - Wara l-Abjad
  - Fajtata Bay
  - St. Thomas Bay (Il-Bajja ta' San Tumas)
  - Munxar Creek (l-Għassa tal-Munxar)
  - Munxar Point (Il-Ponta tal-Munxar)
- Marsaxlokk
  - North-East Point (Il-Ponta tal-Grigal)
  - Fuq il-Maqjel Point (Il-Ponta ta' Fuq il-Maqjel)
  - Xrobb l-Għaġin
  - Taħt il-Maqjel Point (Il-Ponta ta' Taħt il-Maqjel)
  - Ħofra Point (Il-Ponta tal-Ħofra)
  - Xrobb l-Għaġin Islet (It-Taqtiegħa)
  - Rabbit's Point (Ras il-Fenek)
  - L-Eħfar
  - Ħofra l-Kbira Bay (Il-Ħofra l-Kbira)
  - Rabbits' Point (Ras il-Fniek)
  - Il-Morra
  - Ħofra ż-Żgħira Bay (Il-Ħofra ż-Żgħira)
  - Qali Point (Ras il-Qali)
  - Qali Creek (Il-Kalanka tal-Qali)
  - Tumbrell Creek (Il-Kalanka tat-Tumbrell)
  - Tumbrell Point (Il-Ponta tat-Tumbrell)
  - Kalanka l-Fonda
  - Ix-Xagħra
  - Għar Bella
  - St Peter's Pool Point (Il-Ponta tat-Tawwalija)
  - St Peter's Pool (Il-Kalanka tat-Tawwalija)
  - Kalanka Bay (Il-Kalanka tal-Gidien) - Delimara
  - Delimara Islet (It-Taqtiegħa ta' Delimara)
  - Delimara Point (Il-Ponta ta' Delimara)
  - Taħt l-Irdum
  - Taħt il-Fanal (Delimara Lighthouse)
  - Taħt il-Fortizza (Fort Delimara)
  - Delimara
  - Is-Serċ
  - L-Inġinier
  - Ras iċ-Ċagħaq
  - Il-Wilġa
  - Taħt it-Trunċiera
  - Ras it-Triq
  - Ballut Reserve (Il-Ballut)
  - Il-Magħluq
  - Fishermen's Strand (Xatt is-Sajjieda)
  - Marsaxlokk Bay (Il-Port ta' Marsaxlokk)
  - Qrejten Point (Il-Ponta tal-Qrejten)
  - Il-Fossa
  - Il-Ponta l-Kbira - St. Lucian Tower
- Birżebbuġa
  - Tad-Debbra
  - Qajjenza (Il-Qajjenza)
  - Ferretti Battery
  - St. George's Strand (Xatt San Ġorġ)
  - St. George's Bay (Il-Bajja ta' San Ġorġ)
  - Sacred Heart Promenade (Dawret il-Qalb Imqaddsa)
  - Pretty Bay (Il-Bajja s-Sabiħa)
  - Wied il-Buni
  - Calafrana (Kalafrana)
  - Malta Freeport (Port Ħieles)

=== From Ċirkewwa to Tigné Point ===
- Mellieħa
  - Ċirkewwa
  - Marfa Road (Triq il-Marfa)
  - Wied Musa Bay (ir-Ramla ta' Wied Musa)
  - Marfa Palace (il-Palazz tal-Marfa)
  - Marfa Bay (ir-Ramla tal-Bir)
  - Qortin Bay (Ramlet il-Qortin)
  - Ta' Maċċa
  - Armier Bay (l-Armier)
  - Armier Tower (it-Torri tal-Armier)
  - Little Armier Beach (l-Armier iż-Żgħir)
  - Armier Redoubt (is-Sur tal-Aħrax)
  - White Tower (Ramla) Bay (ir-Ramla tat-Torri)
  - White Tower (it-Torri l-Abjad)
  - Daħlet ix-Xmajjar (Rivers Beach)
  - Aħrax Point (il-Ponta tal-Aħrax)
  - Red Cliffs (Rdum l-Aħmar)
  - Aħrax Tower
  - Madonna Cliffs (Rdum il-Madonna)
  - Slugs Bay (Daħlet ix-Xilep)
  - Il-Marbat
  - Tat-Tunnara
  - Rdum il-Ħmar (Donkey Cliffs)
  - L-Aħrax tal-Madonna
  - Is-Sur
  - Taħt is-Sur
  - Tal-Imgħarqa Bay
  - Mellieħa Bay Hotel Beach (Trunċiera ta' Qassisu)
  - Qammieħ Road - Mellieħa Bay
  - Tunnara Promonade (Dawret it-Tunnara) - Għadira Bay/Mellieħa Bay
  - Tas-Sellum
  - Santa Maria Strand (Xatt ta' Santa Marija) - Santa Maria Estate
  - Mġiebaħ Bay (L-Imġiebaħ)
  - Għajn Ħadid Tower
  - Tal-Blata Bay (next to St Paul's Island)
  - Is-Serġ
  - Rdum il-Bies (Falcon Cliffs)
  - Tal-Miġnuna (Mistra Battery)
  - Mistra Bay (il-Qala tal-Mistra)
- San Pawl il-Baħar
  - Rdum Irxaw (Irxaw Cliffs)
  - Ix-Xagħra tal-Kortin
  - Fekruna Bay (Daħlet il-Fekruna)
  - Rdum Stoppin (Stoppin Cliffs)
  - Shipwreck Promenade (Dawret in-Nawfraġju)
  - Xemxija Hill (Telgħet ix-Xemxija) - Xemxija
  - Pwales Beach (Xatt il-Pwales) - Pwales
  - Tal-Kamp
  - St. Paul's Street (Triq San Pawl) - St. Paul's Bay Old Part
  - Għajn Rażul
  - Veċċja Beach/Barracuda Beach (il-Veċċja)
  - Għar tal-Veċċja (Veċċja Cave)
  - Għar Għasfur (Bird's Cave)
  - Rdum tal-Maħruq (Maħruq Cliffs)
  - Tax-Xama' Beach
  - Tax-Xama' Lane (Sqaq tax-Xama')
  - School Street (Triq l-Iskola) - St. Paul's Bay Old Part
  - St. Publius Street (Triq San Publiju) - St. Paul's Bay Old Part
  - St. Frances Street (Triq San Franġisk) - Buġibba
  - Tal-Għażżelin Beach (Qala tal-Għażżelin) - Buġibba
  - St. Gerald Street (Triq San Ġeraldu) - Buġibba
  - Sirens Beach
  - Tal-Gillieru Port
  - Islet Promanade (Dawret il-Gżejjer) - Buġibba/Qawra
  - Bay Square/Buġibba Square (Misraħ il-Bajja)
  - Buġebla
  - Buġibba Beach/Perched Beach (ix-Xtajta ta' Buġibba)
  - Entrenchment Street (Triq it-Trunċiera) - Qawra
  - Qawra Beach (ix-Xtajta tal-Qawra) - Qawra
  - Qawra Point (Ras il-Qawra)
  - Fra Ben Tower Beach (Ta' Fra Ben) - Blue Flag Beach
  - Qawra Promanade (Dawret il-Qawra) - Qawra
  - Ta' Kella
  - Luzzu Street (Triq il-Luzzu) - Qawra
  - Iċ-Ċens tal-Ġebel
  - Ta' Nawċiera
  - Compass Street (Triq il-Boxxla) - Qawra
  - Strands Street (Triq Tax-Xtut) - Qawra
  - Salt Street (Triq il-Melħ) - Qawra
  - J.F. Kennedy Street (Triq J.F. Kennedy) - Qawra
  - Kennedy Grove
  - Salina Bay
- Naxxar
  - Salina, Malta
  - Salini Road (Triq is-Salini) - Salina
  - Ta' Zannar
  - Għallis Tower
  - Coast Road (Tul il-Kosta) - Baħar iċ-Ċagħaq
  - Xagħra tal-Baħar
  - L-Għoqod
  - Qalet Marku Beach
  - Qalet Marku Battery
  - Baħar iċ-Ċagħaq Beach (il-Qala ta' Baħar iċ-Ċagħaq)
  - Ix-Xwiegħi
  - St. Andrew's Road (Triq Sant' Andrija) - Madliena
- Swieqi
  - St. Andrew's Road (Triq Sant' Andrija) - Madliena
- Pembroke, Malta
  - Madliena Tower
  - Pembroke Nature Park
  - Il-Ponta l-Irqiqa
  - Mediterranean Street (Triq il-Mediterran) - Pembroke Centre
- San Ġiljan
  - St. George's Tower
  - St. George's Bay
  - St. George's Bay Strand (Xatt ta' San Ġorġ)
  - Dragonara Road (Triq id-Dragunara) - Paceville
  - Dragonara Point
  - St. Julian's Bay (il-Qaliet)
  - Church Street (Triq il-Knisja) - Paceville
  - Portomaso
  - Spinola Point
  - Spinola Road (Triq Spinola)
  - St. George's Road (Triq San Ġorġ)
  - Spinola Bay
  - George Borg Olivier Street (Triq Ġorġ Borg Olivier) - Spinola Bay/Balluta Bay
  - Main Street (Triq il-Kbira)
  - Balluta Bay
- Sliema
  - Tower Road (Triq it-Torri) - Sliema Centre
  - Exiles
  - Font Għadir (Surfside)
  - Sliema Point Battery (il-Fortizza)
  - Chalet
  - Għar id-Dud Bay
  - Qui-Si-Sana Strand (Xatt ta' Qui-Si-Sana) - Tigné
  - Il-Fortina
  - Tigné Point

=== From Ċirkewwa to Malta Freeport ===
- Mellieħa
  - Ċirkewwa
  - Marfa Road (Triq il-Marfa) - Ċirkewwa
  - Latnija Road (Triq il-Latnija) - Paradise Bay
  - Wied Musa Road (Triq Wied Musa) - L-Aħrax
  - Għajn Tuta Road (Triq Għajn Tuta) - L-Aħrax
  - Marfa Road (Triq il-Marfa) - Għadira Bay
  - L. Wettinger Street (Triq L. Wettinger) - Popeye Village
  - Anchor Bay Road (Triq Tal-Prajjiet) - Popeye Village
  - Mellieħa Road (Triq il-Mellieħa) - Manikata
  - Mejjiesa Road (Triq il-Mejjiesa) - Manikata
  - Old Church Street (Triq il-Knisja l-Qadima) - Manikata
  - Manikata Road (Triq il-Manikata) - Għajn Tuffieħa
  - Naħħalija Road (Triq in-Naħħalija) - Għajn Tuffieħa
- Mġarr
  - Golden Bay Road (Triq Għajn Tuffieħa) - Għajn Tuffieħa
  - Sir T. Zammit Street (Triq Sir Temi Zammit) - Żebbiegħ
  - Sir Harry Luke Street (Triq Sir Harry Luke) - Mġarr Centre
  - Kurat Chetcuti Street (Triq il-Kurat Chetcuti) - Mġarr Centre
  - Main Street (Triq il-Kbira) - Mġarr Centre
  - Santi Road (Triq is-Santi) - Ġnejna Bay
- Rabat, Malta
  - Fomm ir-Riħ Bay (Il-Bajja ta' Fomm ir-Riħ)
  - Qortin Point (Il-Ponta tal-Qortin)
  - Raħeb Point (Ras ir-Raħeb)
  - Qligħ Point (Il-Ponta tal-Qligħ)
  - Il-Qligħ
  - Il-Blata tal-Melħ
  - Vigario Cliffs (Rdum tal-Vikarju)
  - Ix-Xagħra tal-Vikarju
  - Il-Marġa
  - Ġordanja Cliffs (Rdum ta' Ġordanja)
  - Sarġ Cliffs (Rdum tas-Sarġ)
  - Is-Siċċa
  - Il-Frajna
  - Is-Siċċa tal-Frajna
  - Il-Mina
  - Ir-Rfuf
  - Miġra Ferħa
  - Għar Doson
  - Tal-Ferli
  - Ta' Ħammud
  - Għar id-Dwieb
  - Il-Qaws
  - Ras id-Dawwara
  - Ix-Xaqlibi
  - Qaws Cliffs (Rdum tal-Qaws)
  - Tal-Gawwija
- Dingli
  - Iħfar Cliffs (Rdum tal-Iħfar)
  - Dun Nazju Cliffs (Rdum ta' Dun Nazju)
  - Ta' Ġfien
  - Depiro Cliffs (Rdum Depiru)
  - Għar Bittija
  - Għar Bittija Cliffs (Rdum ta' Għar Bittija)
  - Ta' Gidem
  - Għajn Gidem Cliffs (Rdum ta' Għajn Gidem) - Dingli Cliffs
  - Il-Ħotba l-Bajda
  - Gidem Cliffs (Rdum ta' Gidem) - Dingli Cliffs
  - Maddalena
- Siġġiewi
  - Dikkiena Cliffs (Rdum Dikkiena)
  - Faqqanija (Il-Faqqanija)
  - Ħurrieqa Cliffs (Rdum Ħurrieqa)
  - Buxiħ
  - Il-Kullana
  - Ta' Torna
  - Miġer Ilma
  - Fawwara (Il-Fawwara)
  - Għar it-Turkija
  - Għar il-Ħamiem
  - Ta' Dnat
  - Ix-Xwieki
  - Ix-Xaqqa
  - Il-Gżira
  - White Cliff (Is-Sies l-Abjad)
  - Bieb l-Għerien
  - L-Ilsna
  - Ta' Berwieq
  - Għar Lapsi
  - Ix-Xagħra ta' Għar Lapsi
  - Ras Ħanżir
  - Ix-Xagħra tal-Magħlaq
  - Il-Magħlaq
- Qrendi
  - Għar Ħaxixa
  - Il-Mitqub
  - Il-Magħlaq
  - Ħalq it-Tafal
  - L-Ilsna
  - In-Neffiet
  - Ħamrija Point (Ras il-Ħamrija)
  - Denb il-Bagħal
  - Ħaġar Qim
  - Tal-Gawwija
  - Ta' Bexxiexa
  - Tal-Maqluba
  - Ras il-Bajjada
  - Ix-Xagħra ta' Ras il-Bajjada
  - Wied iż-Żurrieq
  - Tas-Suldati
- Żurrieq
  - Blue Grotto (Il-Ħnejja)
  - Wied Babu
  - Il-Munqar
  - Ta' Pietru
  - It-Tirxija
  - Id-Daħla
  - Tax-Xagħra
  - Wied Ganu
  - Qalb il-Għarib
  - L-Ixmiex
  - Il-Ħrejfa
  - Ġebel Maqtugħ
  - Wied il-Bassasa
  - Il-Bajtra
  - Il-Minkba
  - Il-Kap ta' Wied Fulija
  - Wied Fulija
  - Il-Borġ ta' Wied Fulija
  - Taż-Żondu
  - Ix-Xrejjek
  - Wied Diegu
  - Il-Ħaġra
  - Ta' Melħa
  - Għar it-Taraġ
  - L-Iskoll tas-Sajjetta
  - Wied Moqbol
  - L-Iskolji
  - L-Għawejra
- Birżebbuġa
  - L-Arblu (Ħal Far)
  - Ta' Żgħer (Ħal Far)
  - Il-Blajata (Ħal Far)
  - Wied Żnuber (Ħal Far)
  - Minżel Spark (Ħal Far)
  - L-Artal (Ħal Far)
  - Ħal Far
  - Blakt il-Far (Ħal Far)
  - Għar Ħasan
  - L-Inwadar
  - Bengħajsa
  - Għar in-Nagħaġ
  - Fort Benghisa (Il-Fortizza ta' Bengħajsa)
  - Għar Qirduwa
  - Ix-Xoqqiet
  - Wied ix-Xoqqa
  - Benghisa Point (Il-Ponta ta' Bengħajsa)
  - Malta Freeport (Port Ħieles)
