= Golden Bay =

Golden Bay may refer to:

- Golden Bay / Mohua, a bay at the northern end of New Zealand's South Island
- Golden Bay (Malta), a bay and beach on the coastline of Malta
- Golden Bay High School, a high school in Tākaka, New Zealand
- Golden Bay, Western Australia, a suburb in Perth, Western Australia
