= Burdigalian =

Age in the early Miocene

- 20.45 – 15.98 Ma

Chronology
← / Messinian salinity crisis; ← / North American prairie expands
Subdivision of the Neogene according to the ICS, as of 2024. Vertical axis scale: Millions of years ago
- Formerly part of: Tertiary Period/System

Etymology
- Name formality: Formal

Usage information
- Celestial body: Earth
- Regional usage: Global (ICS)
- Time scale(s) used: ICS Time Scale

Definition
- Chronological unit: Age
- Stratigraphic unit: Stage
- Time span formality: Formal
- Lower boundary definition: Not formally defined
- Lower boundary definition candidates: Near FAD of the Planktonic Foraminiferan Globigerinoides altiaperturus; Near top of magnetic polarity chronozone C6An
- Lower boundary GSSP candidate section(s): Astronomically tuned ODP-core
- Upper boundary definition: Not formally defined
- Upper boundary definition candidates: Near top of magnetic polarity chronozone C5Cn.1n; Near FAD of the Planktonic Foraminiferan Praeorbulina glomerosa
- Upper boundary GSSP candidate section(s): La Vedova, Italy; St. Peter's Pool, Malta; Astronomically tuned ODP-core

The Burdigalian is, in the geologic timescale, an age or stage in the early Miocene. It spans the time between 20.45 Ma and 15.98 Ma (million years ago). Preceded by the Aquitanian, the Burdigalian was the first and longest warming period of the Miocene and is succeeded by the Langhian.

== Stratigraphic definition ==
The name Burdigalian comes from Burdigala, the Latin name for the city of Bordeaux, France. The Burdigalian Stage was introduced in scientific literature by Charles Depéret in 1892.

The base of the Burdigalian is at the first appearance of foram species Globigerinoides altiaperturus and the top of magnetic chronozone C6An. As of 2016, an official GSSP for the Burdigalian had not yet been assigned.

The top of the Burdigalian (the base of the Langhian) is defined by the first appearance of foram species Praeorbulina glomerosa and is also coeval with the top of magnetic chronozone C5Cn.1n.

== Paleontology ==
Famous Burdigalian palaeontologic localities include the Turritellenplatte of Ermingen in Germany and the Dominican amber deposits of Hispaniola.

Possible human evolutionary ancestors such as Victoriapithecus evolved during this time interval.

== Palaeoclimatology ==
Southwestern Africa began to desertify near the end of the Burdigalian, approximately 17 to 16 Ma.
