= Borġ l-Imramma =

Archaeological site in Malta

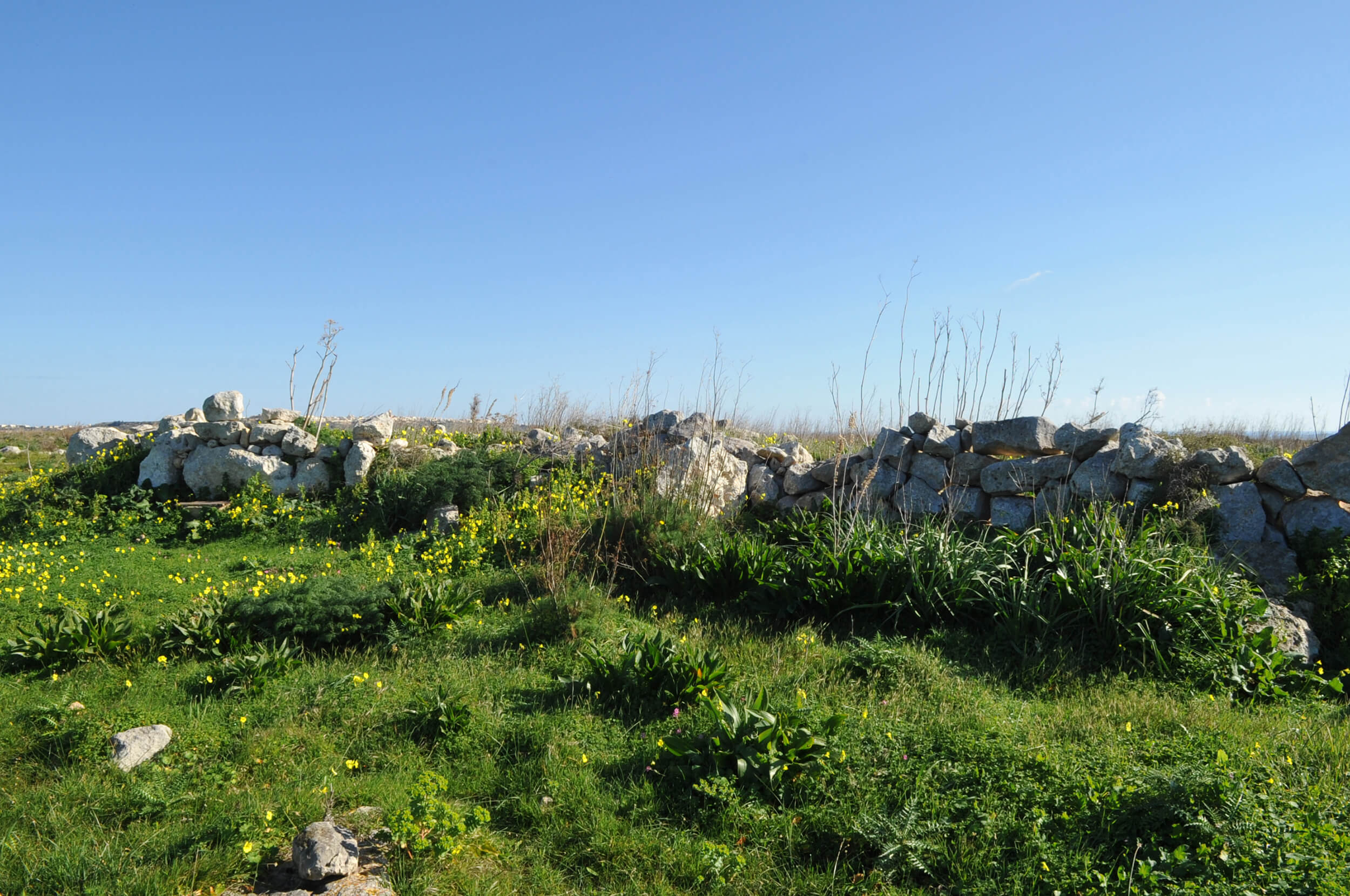
- The unexcavated south wall of the temple, 2021

- Location within Malta
- 36°1′10″N 14°15′30″E
- Location: Sannat, Gozo, Malta

History
- Built: c. 3500 BC

Site notes
- Elevation: 126 m (413 ft)
- Area: 174,000 Square Metres

The Borġ l-Imramma site is a major building of the temple period. It is located 500 metres (550 yd) southeast of the Ta' Ċenċ plateau. Near the structure, cart ruts and a dolmen can also be observed.

== Structure ==
The temple shares some of the characteristics of the usual Maltese Megalithic temple such as the Ħaġar Qim or Ġgantija temples. This design usually includes a large, roughly circular courtyard, about 20 metres (66 ft) across. This courtyard was presumably open to the sky. Clustered on its north, west and south sides are a number of small, again nearly circular chambers. An entrance passage for the courtyard is on the northwest wall. This passage is made from large, squared stones. This entrance's rocks are the strongest in structural integrity ever found in Malta. The bottom part has not yet been excavated but large portions of chert can be seen. The structure is believed to date back around 4100 to 3000 BCE.

== Later use ==
It is also speculated that the Phoenicians used the temple for unknown purposes.

== Etymology ==
1. Borġ - Widely known as the expression of ''An amount of rocks placed on top of each other."
2. Imramma - A colloquial type of rodent, usually spoken as "Ġurdien tal-Imramma"
