= Tombrell Battery =

Artillery battery in Delimara, Malta

- Batterija tat-Tumbrell
- Marsaxlokk, Malta

Site information
- Type: Artillery battery
- Owner: Government of Malta
- Condition: Only rock-hewn ditch remains

Location
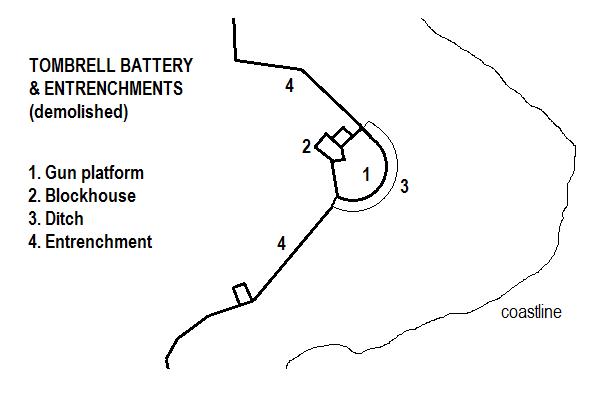
- Map of Tombrell Battery and the nearby entrenchments
- Coordinates: 35°49′43.7″N 14°33′48″E

Site history
- Built: c. 1722
- Built by: Order of Saint John
- Materials: Limestone
- Fate: Demolished

Tombrell Battery (Maltese: Batterija tat-Tumbrell) was an artillery battery in Delimara, Marsaxlokk, Malta. It was built in around 1722 by the Order of Saint John as one of a series of coastal fortifications around the coasts of the Maltese Islands. The battery was demolished at the end of the 19th century, and only its rock-hewn ditch survives today.

== History ==
Tombrell Battery was built on a small headland known as Tombrell Point, which is part of the Delimara peninsula. It is believed to have been built in around 1722, but its actual date of construction is not yet known. The battery consisted of a semi-circular gun platform, with guns mounted en barbette. Its land front was enclosed by an unusual combination of a redan and a blockhouse, and it was surrounded by a rock-hewn ditch. An irregular entrenchment wall flanked either side of the battery.

Tombrell Battery was demolished by the British military at the end of the 19th century to clear the line of fire of Wolseley Battery.

== Present day ==
Today, only the battery's rock-hewn ditch can be seen. The site is covered by a small mound of rubble, and the battery's foundations are possibly buried underneath. An archaeological excavation would be required to study the site properly.
