= Delimara peninsula =

Peninsula in southern Malta

Delimara Dellimara (Maltese)
- Peninsula
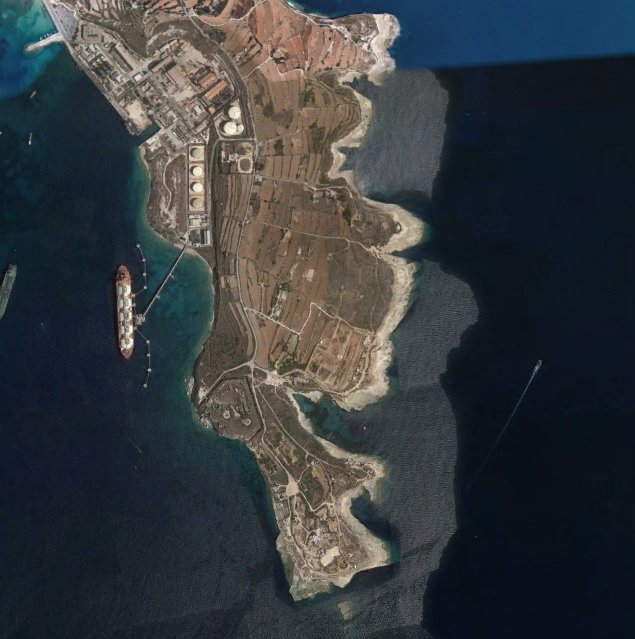
- Satellite imagery of the Peninsula

- Delimara located on a map of Malta
- Coordinates: 35.832°N 14.559°E

Dimensions
  - Length: 2.37 km (1.47 mi)
  - Width: 0.6 km (0.37 mi)
- Elevation: 37 m (121 ft)
- Highest elevation: 204

The Delimara peninsula (Maltese: Dellimara) is a peninsula located on the southeastern tip of the island of Malta's South Eastern Region, forming half of Marsaxlokk's coast on Marsaxlokk Bay. The towns of Marsaxlokk and Birżebbuġa are located 2.77 kilometres (1.72 mi) and 1.97 kilometres (1.22 mi) away respectively. It is mostly known as the location of the primary power station in Malta, the Delimara power station. The peninsula is also known for its two tourist-oriented bays: St Peter's Pool and Kalanka Bay. A lighthouse, a British fort and the remains of a Hospitaller battery can also be found on the peninsula.

== See also ==
- Delimara Tower
- Fort Delimara
- Delimara Lighthouse
- Delimara Power Station
  - Energy in Malta
- Delimara Transmitter
