= Delimara Transmitting Station =

Coordinates: 35.8411°N 14.5699°E

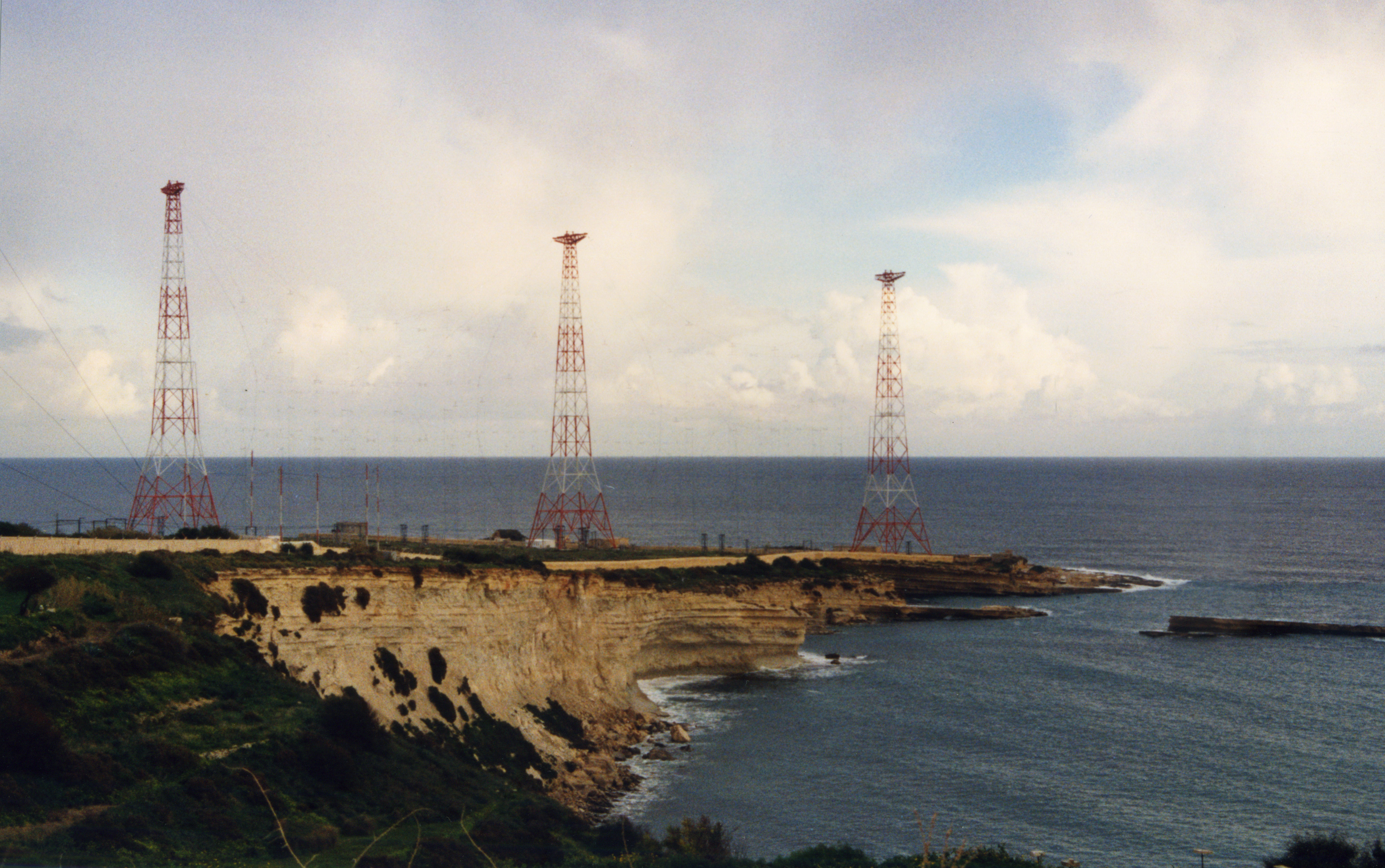
Short wave antenna masts of the Cyclops relay

The Delimara Transmitting Station (also known as Cyclops) was a relay station of German international broadcasting station Deutsche Welle at Xrobb l-Għaġin on the Delimara peninsula in Malta. It was used as short- and medium wave transmission site. It opened in 1974 and covered southern Europe and the Middle East.

== Relations with Malta ==
The site was governed by agreements between Deutsche Welle and the Government of Malta. The land was granted to DW in 1971 but was transferred back to Malta in an agreement in November 1982. In September 1982 the Maltese government cut electricity to the relay station due to their improved relations with Libya, and the passage of the Maltese Foreign Interference Act. The station closed on 1 September 1982 and the new international agreement was signed in November 1982.

Radio Mediterranean was a joint Maltese-Algerian public station which broadcast from this transmitter from 1983. The Government of Malta had an agreement with Libya in 1975 to broadcast the Voice of Friendship and Solidarity from this relay station.

== The site ==
It consisted of two parcels of land: In-Nigret in Mqabba (11 and a half tumoli) and Xrobb l-Ghagin in Marsaxlokk (167 tumoli). The 1982 agreement allowed the maximum of three short wave transmitters of up to 250 kW each, and two medium wave transmitters of up to 600 kW.

For the medium wave transmissions, which took place on 1557 kHz with a transmission power of 600 kW, it had two guyed masts, insulated against ground, which were guyed with polymeric guys. The short wave antennas were mounted on free-standing lattice towers. Direction was achieved by different slewing of the various antennae available.

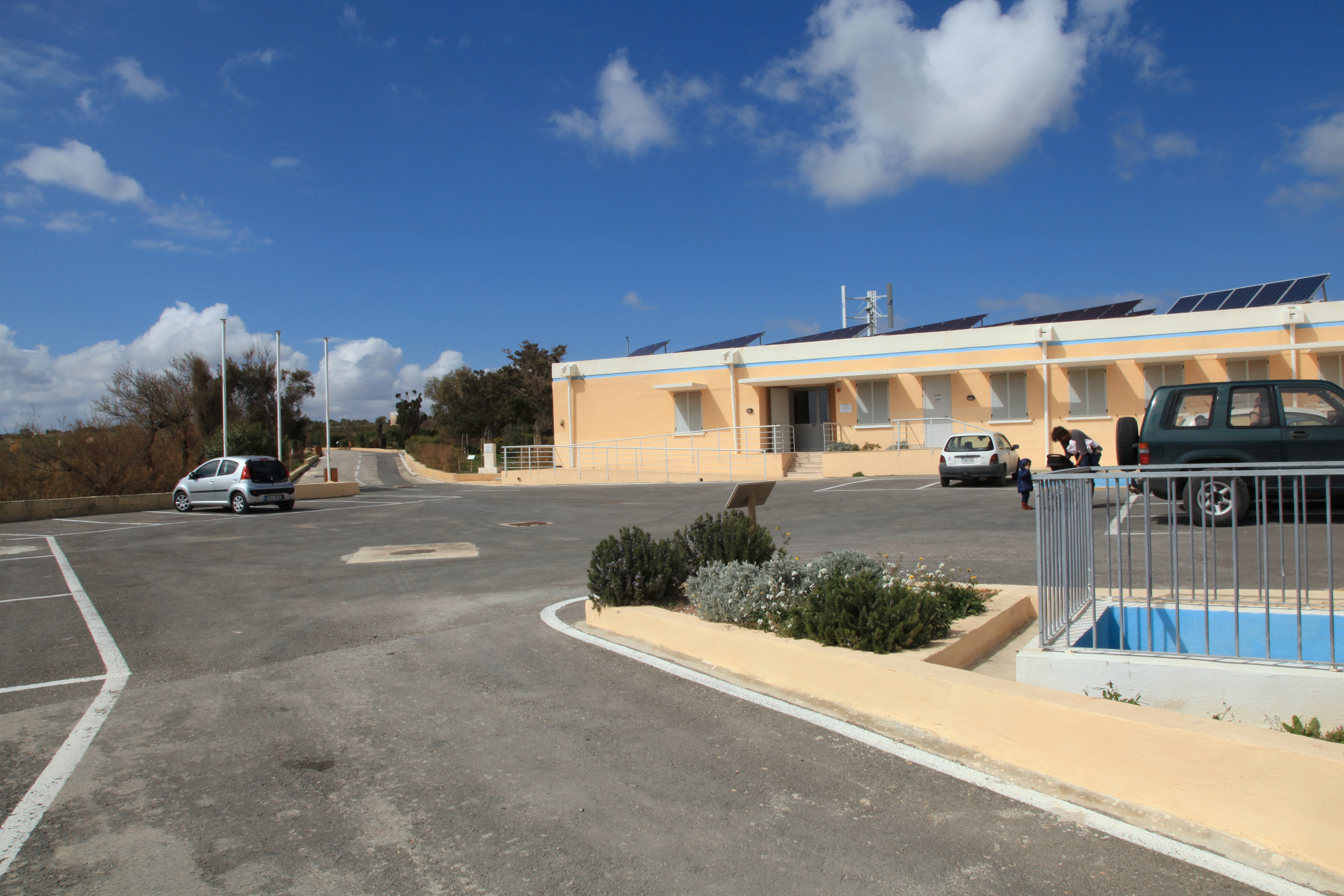
Former station building, now converted and remodelled

Originally, the medium wave antenna consisted of three masts, each 88 metres tall, but at one mast one (Parafil) guy melted as a result of the high electric field values halfway up from the anchor point. Unfortunately there was also a storm at this time, which resulted in mast collapse. This was later replaced.

Delimara Transmitter was shut down in 1996. The site was used as a fish farm and is now a nature reserve. One of the old site buildings is now used as a hostel.
