= Blue Grotto (Malta) =

Sea caverns in Malta

- Taħt il-Ħnejja
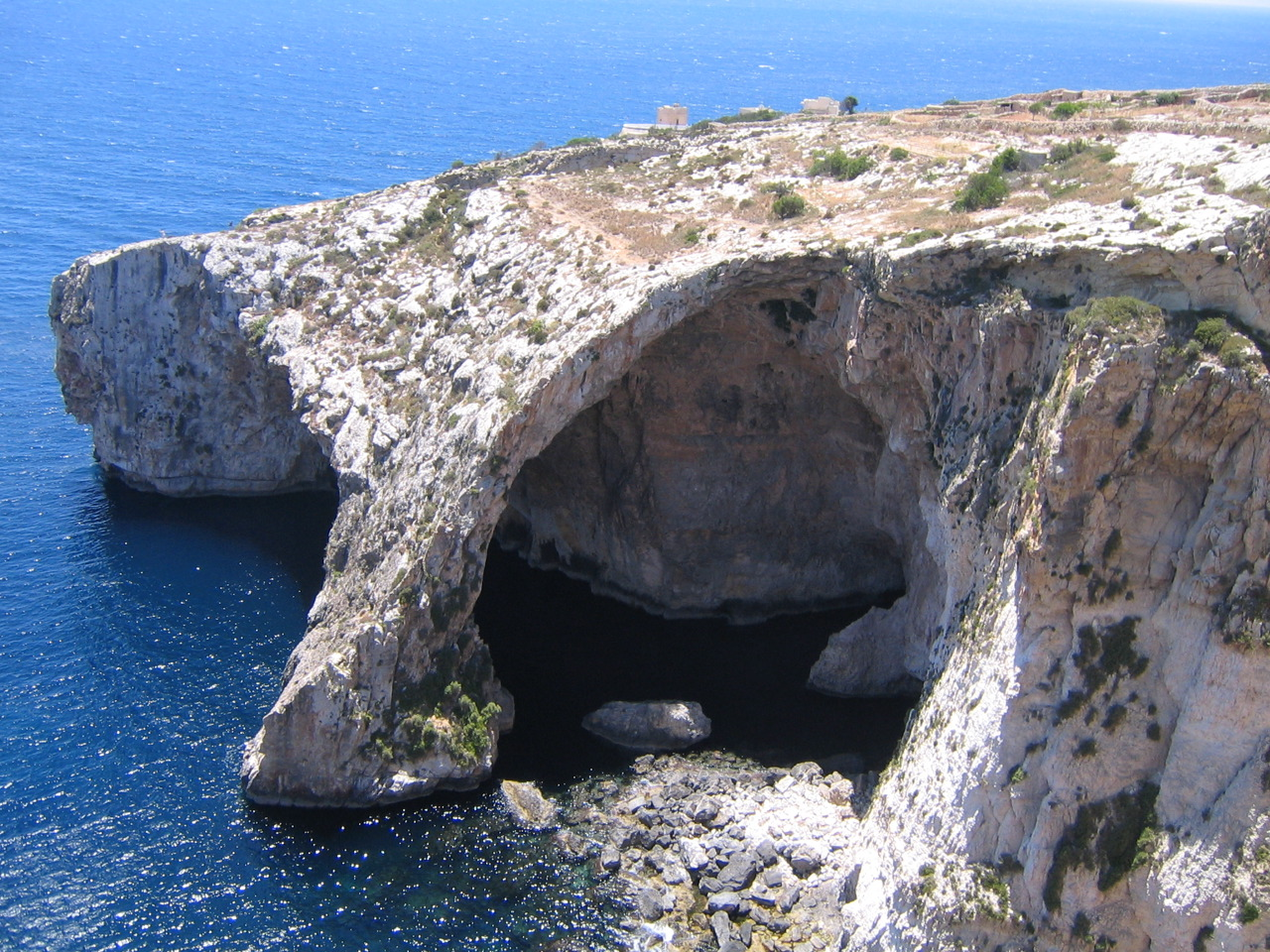
- The grotto as seen from Babu Valley

- Location within Malta
- Location: Qrendi, Malta
- Coordinates: 35°49′N 14°27′E
- Depth: Sea level
- Length: 237.77 metres (780.1 ft)
- Height variation: 325 feet (99 m)
- Elevation: 95 feet (29 m)

The Blue Grotto (Maltese: Taħt il-Ħnejja) refers to a number of sea caverns on the south east coast of Malta, a short distance from the fishing harbour limits of Wied iż-Żurrieq, Malta. Wied iz-Zurrieq, the Blue Grotto and neighboring caves are all located within the Qrendi village confines, per Local Council Act 1993 and a 1910 legal dispute between the villages of Qrendi and Zurrieq over their jurisdiction, which ruled in favour of Qrendi.

Both the Wied iz-Zurrieq harbour and Blue Grotto sea caves are located on the coastline opposite to the small uninhabited islet of Filfla, which is a bird sanctuary.

The location of the caves leads to the seawater reflecting shades of blue on the cave walls and ceilings.

Several caverns also mirror the phosphorescent colours of the underwater flora and fauna, whilst other caverns show a deep dark shade of blue.

The views underwater, can be shades of red, mauve, green, orange and yellow. Making it a popular spot for tourists to click photos.

The Blue Grotto is a popular destination for tourists to Malta with boat trips visiting the caves running all days of the year, weather permitting.

Scuba diving on the nearby scuttled wreck Um El Faroud, and snorkelling along the coastline, together with rock climbing, are the most popular activities practised here.

The location has been used many times by filmmakers in big screen and TV productions, namely Hell Boats, Troy, twenty-fifth season of The Amazing Race, "Cadbury Milk Tray" chocolate adverts, and the Rai 2 travel programme Sereno Variabile, amongst other smaller commissions and photoshoots.

== Gallery ==
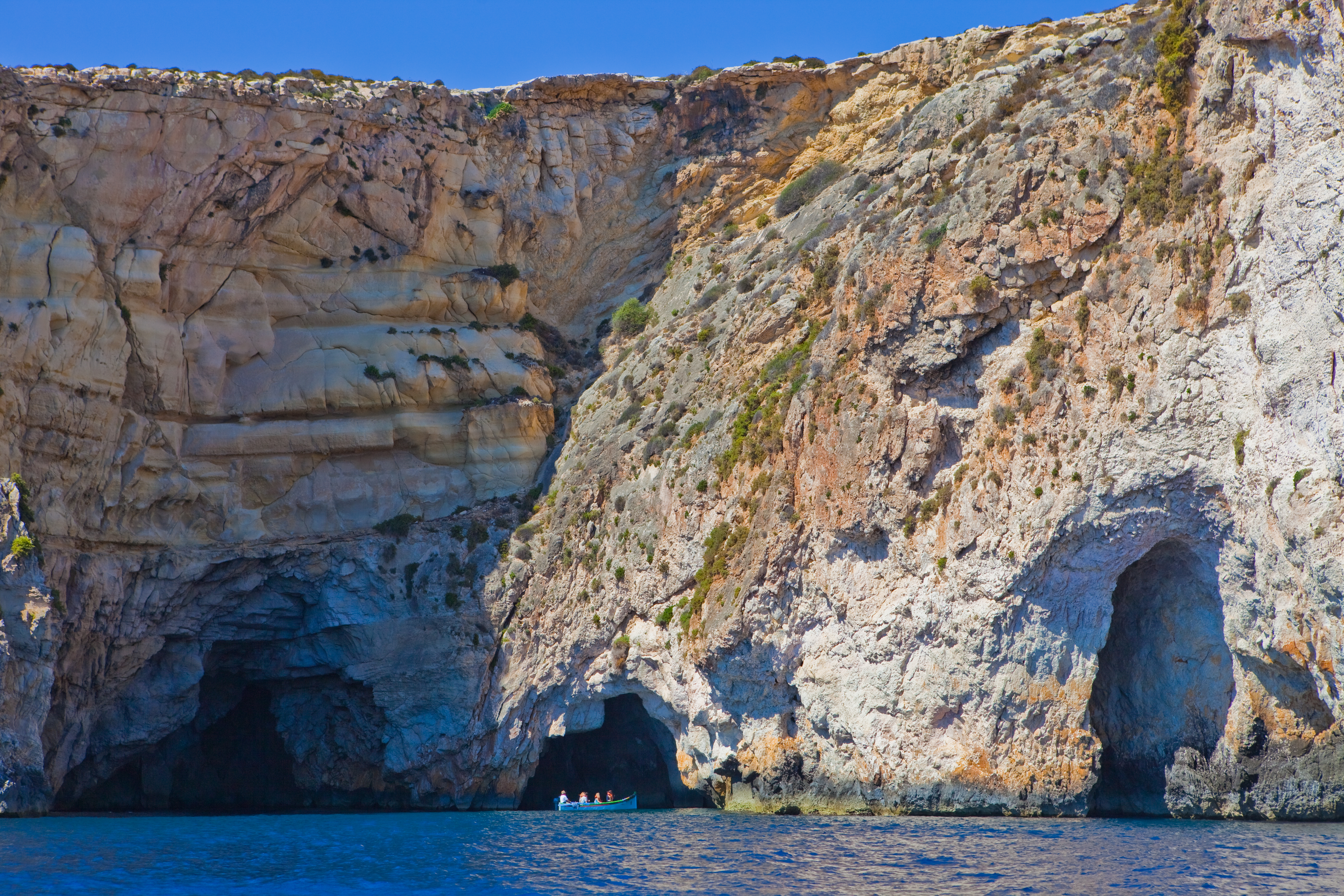
A tourist boat at the Blue Grotto.

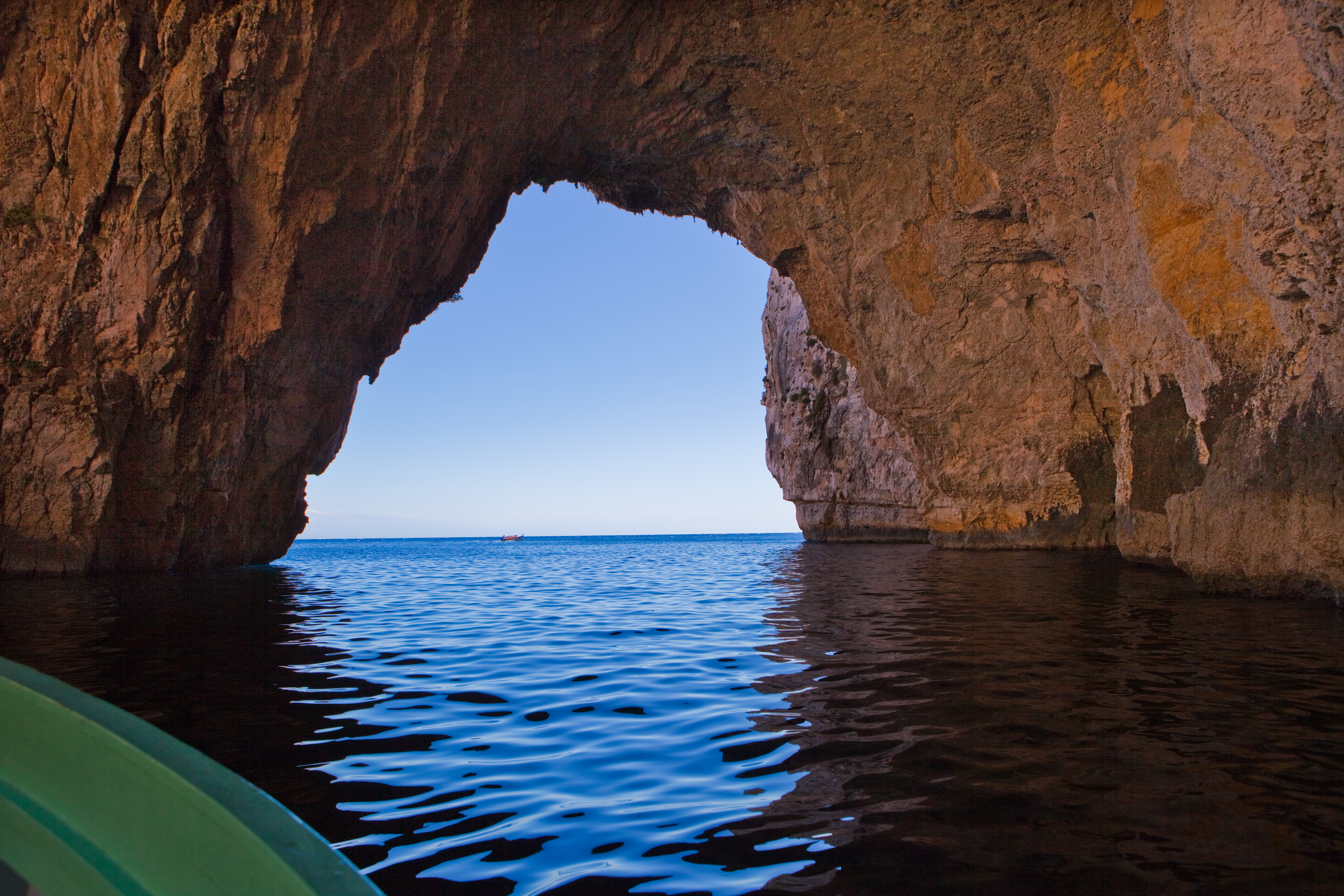
As seen from inside the Blue Grotto.

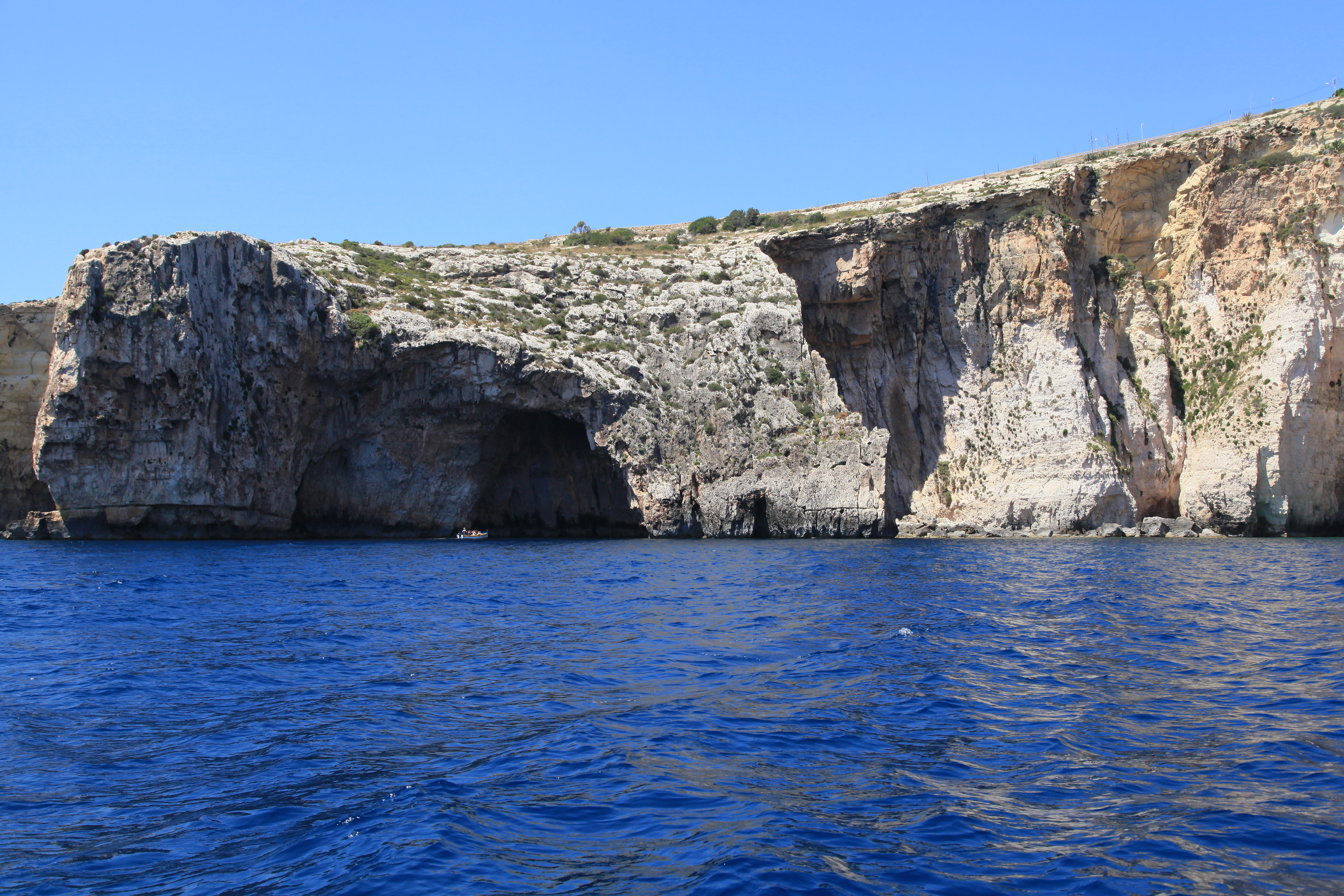
The grotto from outside as seen from sea-level

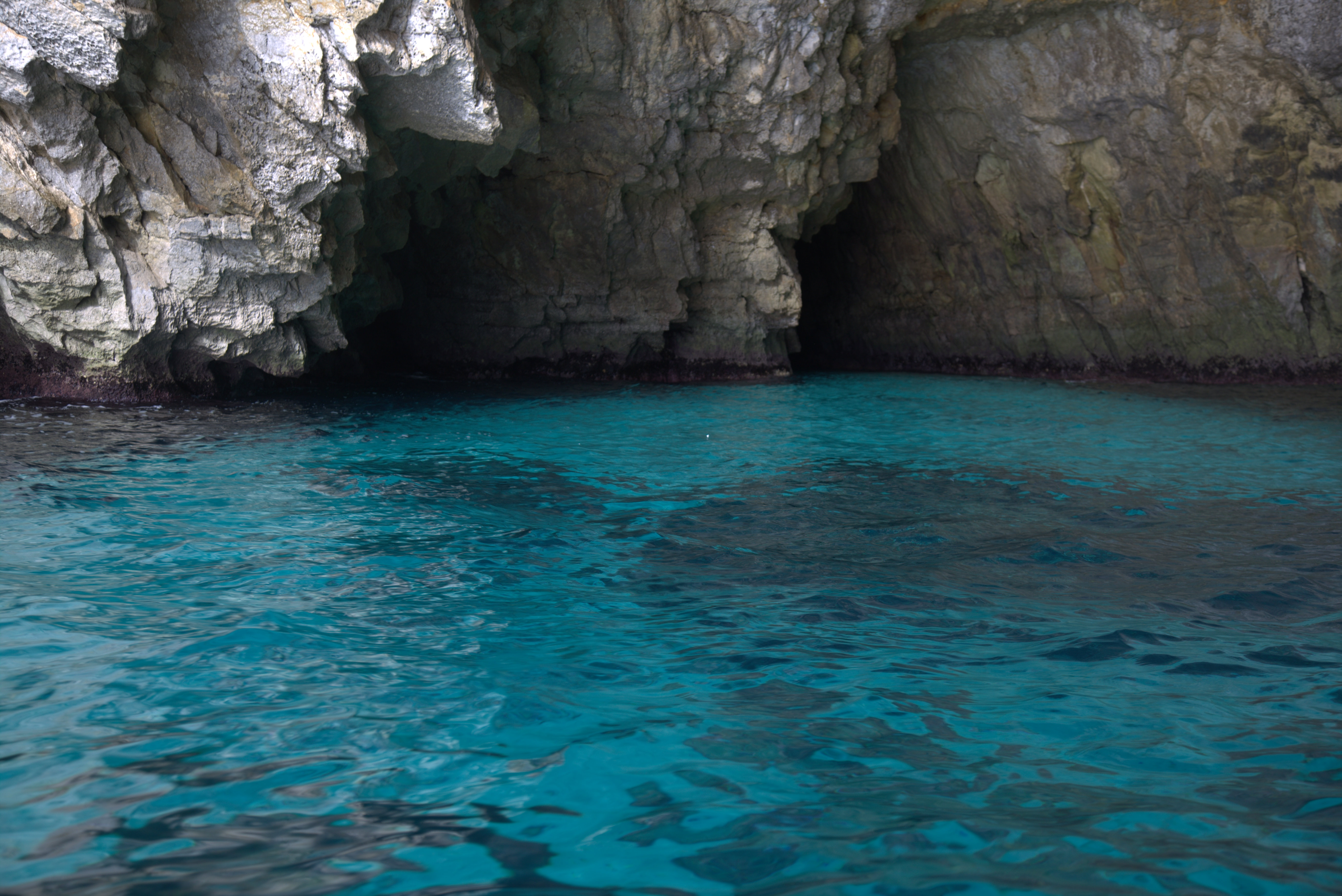
The water at the blue grotto
