= Ta' Ċenċ Cliffs =

Cliffs in Sannat, Malta

Coordinates: 36°01′N 14°14′E

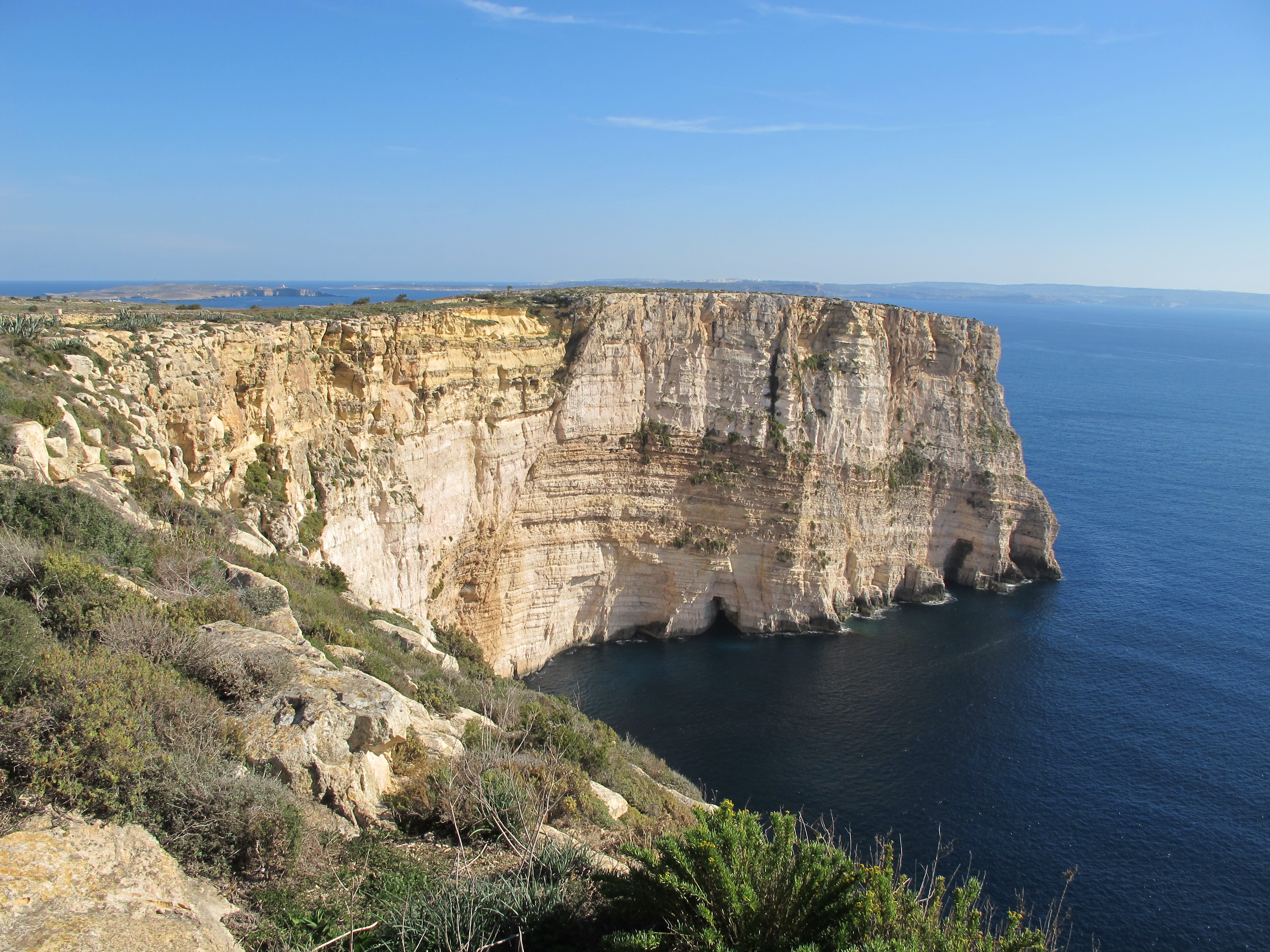
Ta' Ċenċ Cliffs

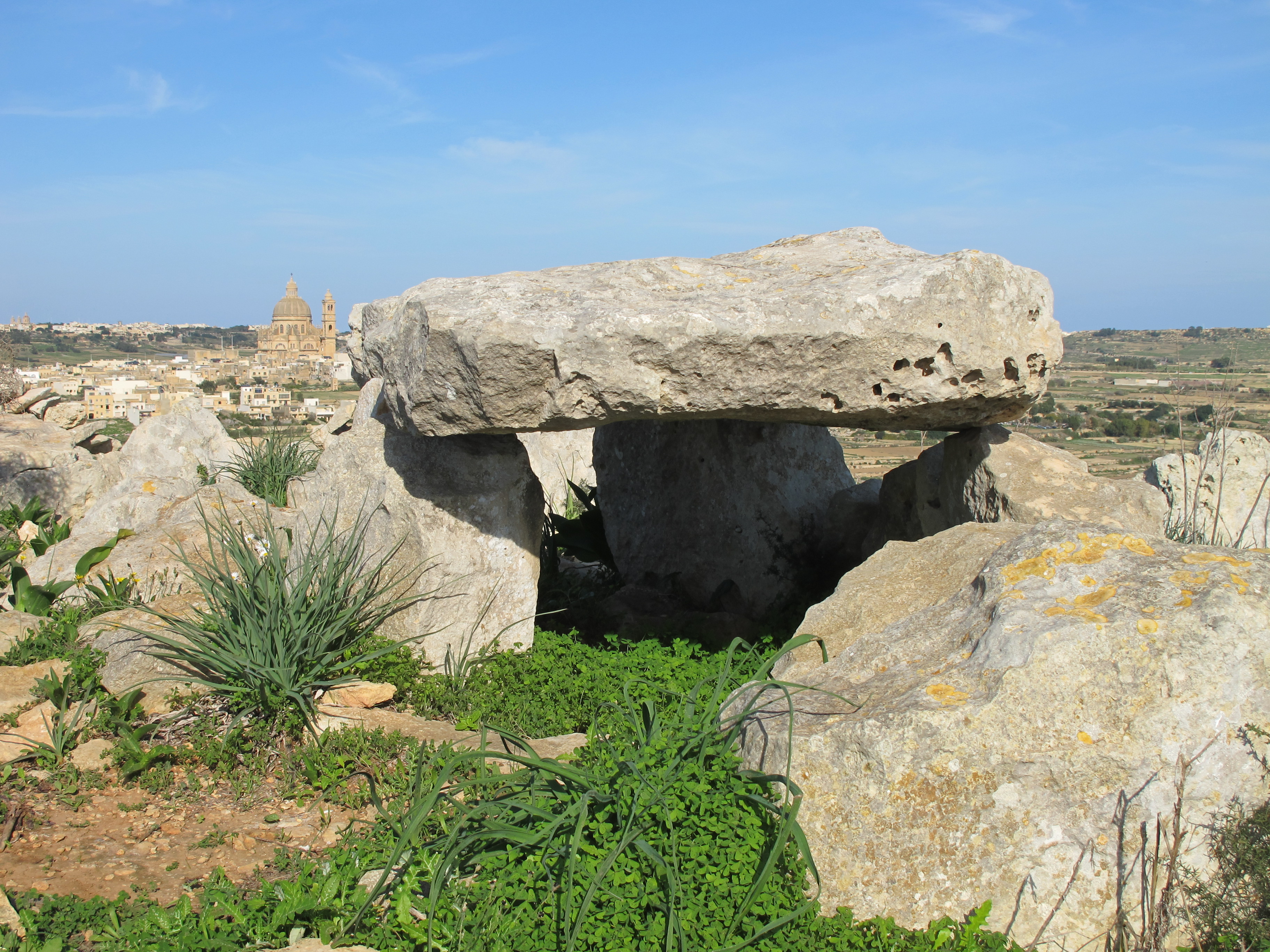
Dolmen at Ta' Ċenċ

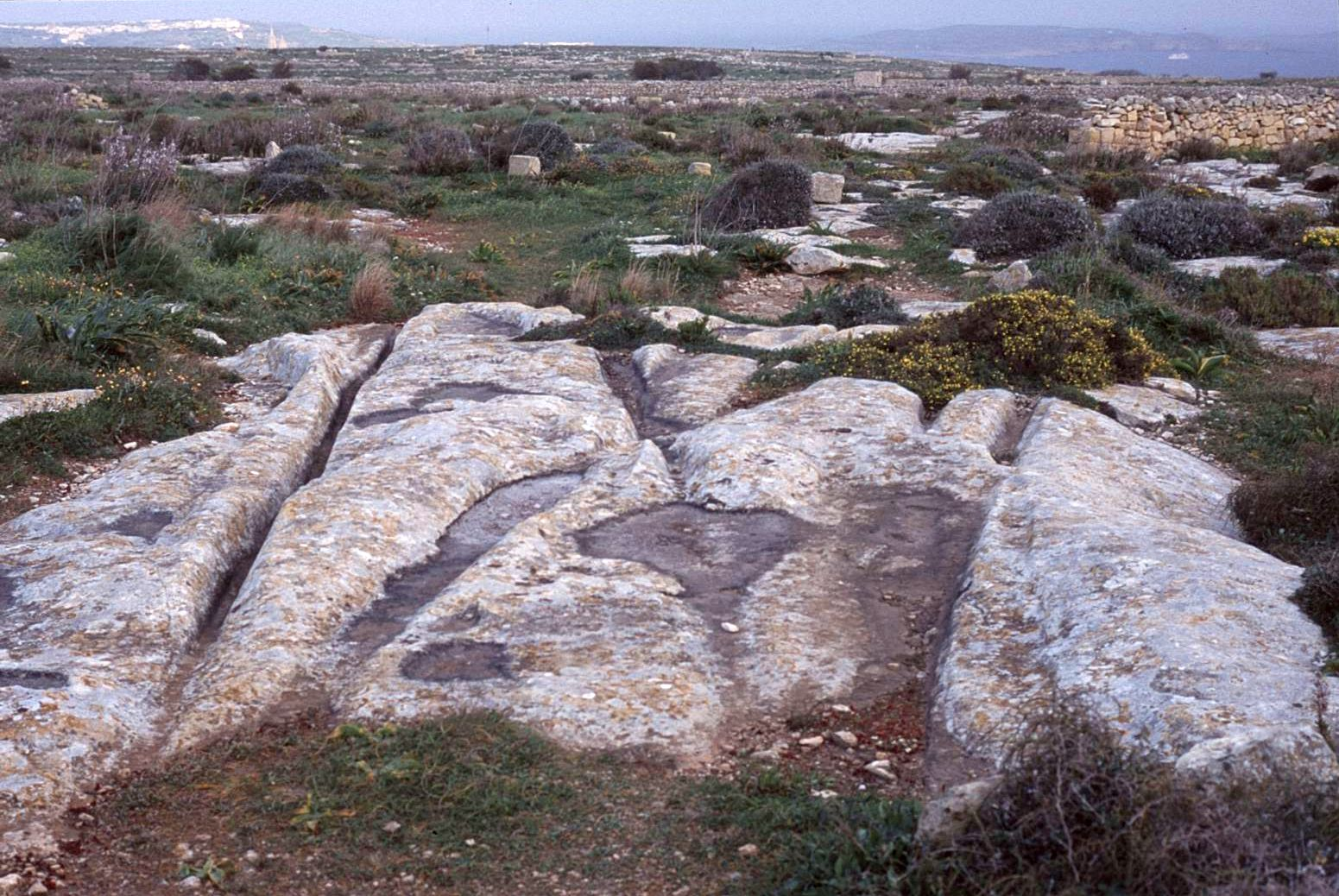
Cart ruts at Ta' Ċenċ

The Ta' Ċenċ Cliffs form a 20 ha linear strip of cliffed coastline in Sannat, on the southern coast of the island of Gozo, Malta, in the Mediterranean Sea. The area consists of garrigue and steep and rugged cliffs, which rise from sea level to a height of 120 m. The cliffs are identified as an Important Bird Area (IBA) by BirdLife International because they support 800–1000 breeding pairs of Cory's shearwaters and 150–300 pairs of yelkouan shearwaters.

Archaeological remains have also been found close to the cliffs. These include Borġ l-Imramma (the remains of an Mġarr phase megalithic temple), two dolmens dating back to the Tarxien Cemetery phase and a number of cart ruts.

== See also ==
- List of birds of Malta
