= Ras id-Dawwara =

Geographical area in Rabat, Malta

Coordinates: 35.8683°N 14.3519°E

Ras id-Dawwara is a geographical area in Rabat, Malta, on the line of picturesque cliffs including Dingli Cliffs. On site are several caves at sea level.

== History ==
Carmelo Borg Pisani, a fascist spy who was executed for treason in 1942, landed here as part of a failed espionage mission to prepare for Operation Herkules.
