= Il-Blata tal-Melħ =

Landmark in north-west Malta

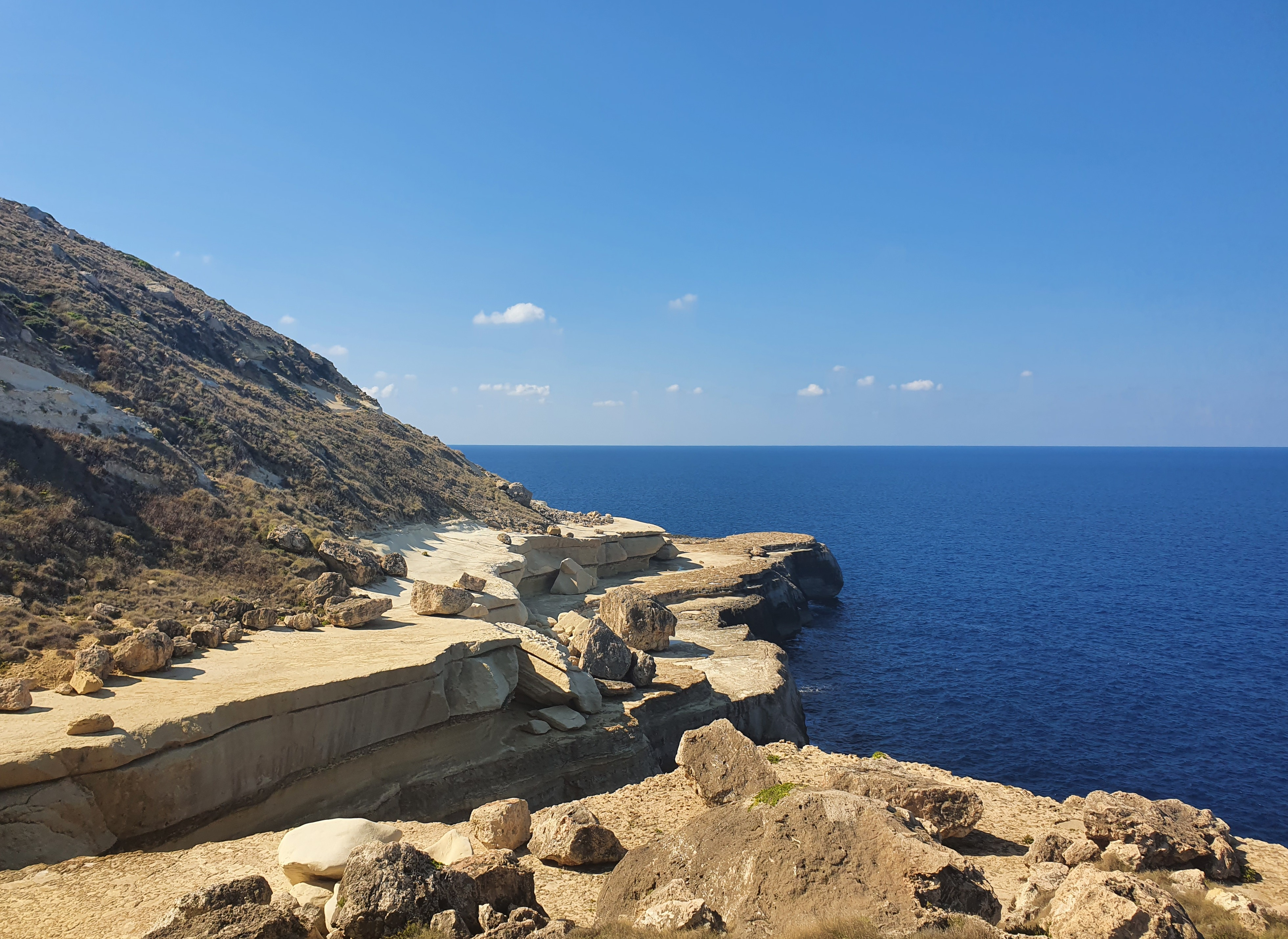
Il-Blata tal-Melh

Il-Blata tal-Melħ is a landmark in the north-western region of the island of Malta, close to Rabat and Mġarr. The name Il-Blata tal-Melħ can be translated as the Salt Rock, named after a series of salt deposits in the limestone at this location.

== Geological setting ==
Malta is part of the Maltese archipelago, which consists of the islands of Malta, Gozo and Comino and several smaller islands. It is located south of Sicily in the centre of the Mediterranean.

The rocks exposed in the Maltese islands cover the period from the late Oligocene to the early Messinian. During the Late Oligocene and Miocene, the region was part of the Malta Hyblean Platform, which forms the northernmost extension of the African continental margin. African continental margin. Together with the south-eastern part of Sicily, they form the Hyblean Plateau, which is a carbonate platform. Tectonic activity within the Mediterranean area has played an important role in forming the shape of the archipelago. The most important part in shaping the Mediterranean is the N-S convergence between the African and Eurasian plates, which started in the Late Mesozoic. For the Maltese Islands, there are two major faults that form the islands. The Victoria Line Fault, an ENE-WSW that crosses the northern part of Malta, and the South Gozo Fault, which is located in the southern part of the island of Gozo. In addition, the African and Arabian plates continued to move northwards throughout the Cenozoic, resulting in the fragmentation of the Tethys Ocean and the formation of several smaller basins. Together with the collision of the Arabian and Eurasian plates, which caused the closure of the Tethyan pathway between the Central Atlantic and Indian Ocean, this led to a change in the ocean circulation pattern during the Miocene.

== Stratigraphy ==
The Il-Blata section is about 50m high and consists of carbonate rocks. The lowest part of the section marks the transition between shallow-water carbonates of the Lower Coralline Limestone Formation and hemipelagic carbonates of the Lower Globigerina Limestone Formation. The Lower Globigerina Limestone Formation consists of yellowish carbonates and is only about 2 m thick here. It is overlain by the Middle Globigerina Formation, which is the most dominant formation at the outcrop with a thickness of about 35 m. The formation is greyish and contains several marl beds, chert beds and phosphorite beds. There are 3 main phosphorite beds and several minor phosphate-bearing beds. These include phosphate nodules and phosphate fossils. The main phosphate beds are between the Lower Coralline Limestone Formation and the Lower Globigerina Limestone Formation, between the Lower Globigerina Limestone Formation and the Middle Globigerina Limestone Formation, and between the Middle Globigerina Limestone Formation and the Upper Globigerina Limestone Formation. The Upper Globigerina Limestone consists of yellowish carbonates and covers the uppermost 5 m of the section.

== Fossils ==
Many fossils can also be found in the exposed rocks. The coralline limestones consist mainly of coralline algae and the globigerina limestones mainly of planctonic foraminifera, but the phosphorite beds show a greater diversity. Fossils such as corals, bivalves, snails, bryozoans and fish teeth can be found in the phosphorite beds.
