= Għajn Barrani =

Cliffs in Malta

Coordinates: 36°04′00″N 14°16′10″E

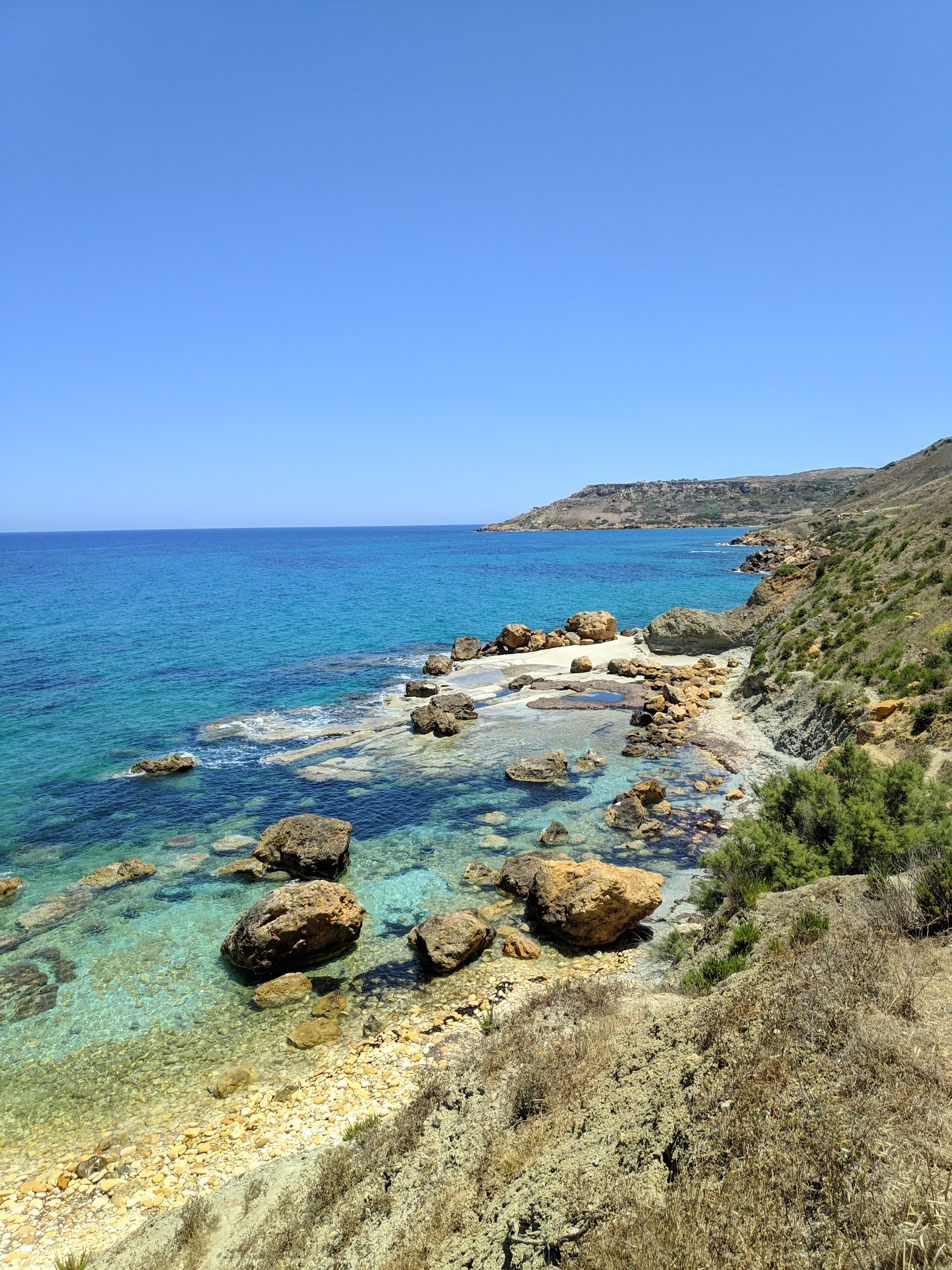
Swimming area in Għajn Barrani

Għajn Barrani (English: Foreigner’s Spring) is a stretch of cliffs located along the north of Gozo, Malta, from Marsalforn to Ramla Bay. The area consists of flat terrain, rocks and clay slopes.

It contains a hidden beach due to its secluded position.

== History ==
During the Invasion of Gozo in 1551, the Ottoman Turks used to stop with their galleys at Għajn Barrani due to the fresh water arising from its springs. It is assumed that the name Għajn Barrani originates from this event.

== Wildlife ==
Għajn Barrani contains various native trees, including pears, plums, olive trees and grape vines. The clay slopes also have a range of endemic species, including Hyoseris frutescens, Matthiola incana, Trifolium squamosum, Ononis oligophylla, Juncus acutus, Darniella melitensis and Atriplex halimus.

== Protection status ==
Għajn Barrani is enlisted as a protected area by Natura 2000.

== Gallery ==
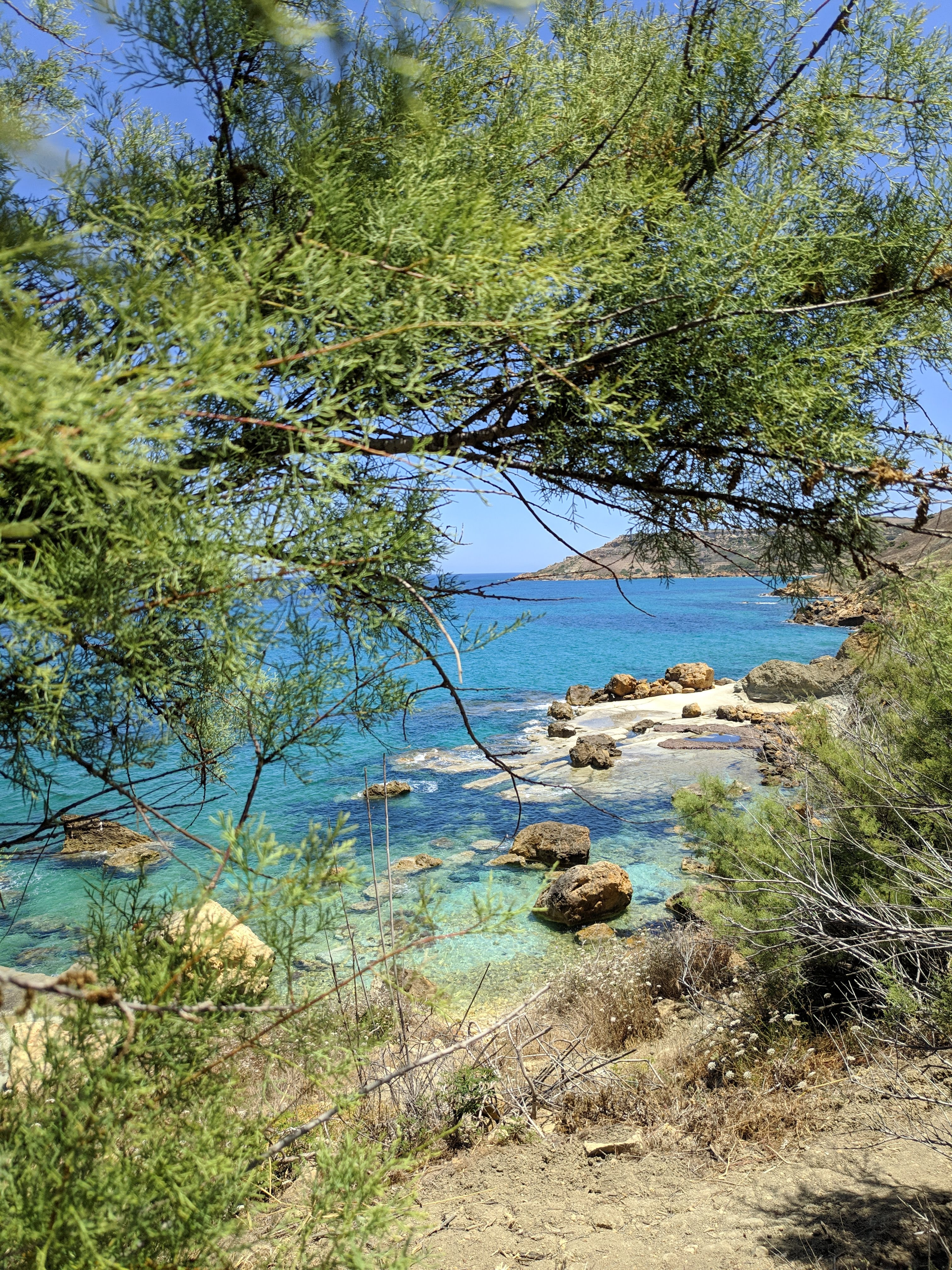
Passage view of Għajn Barrani

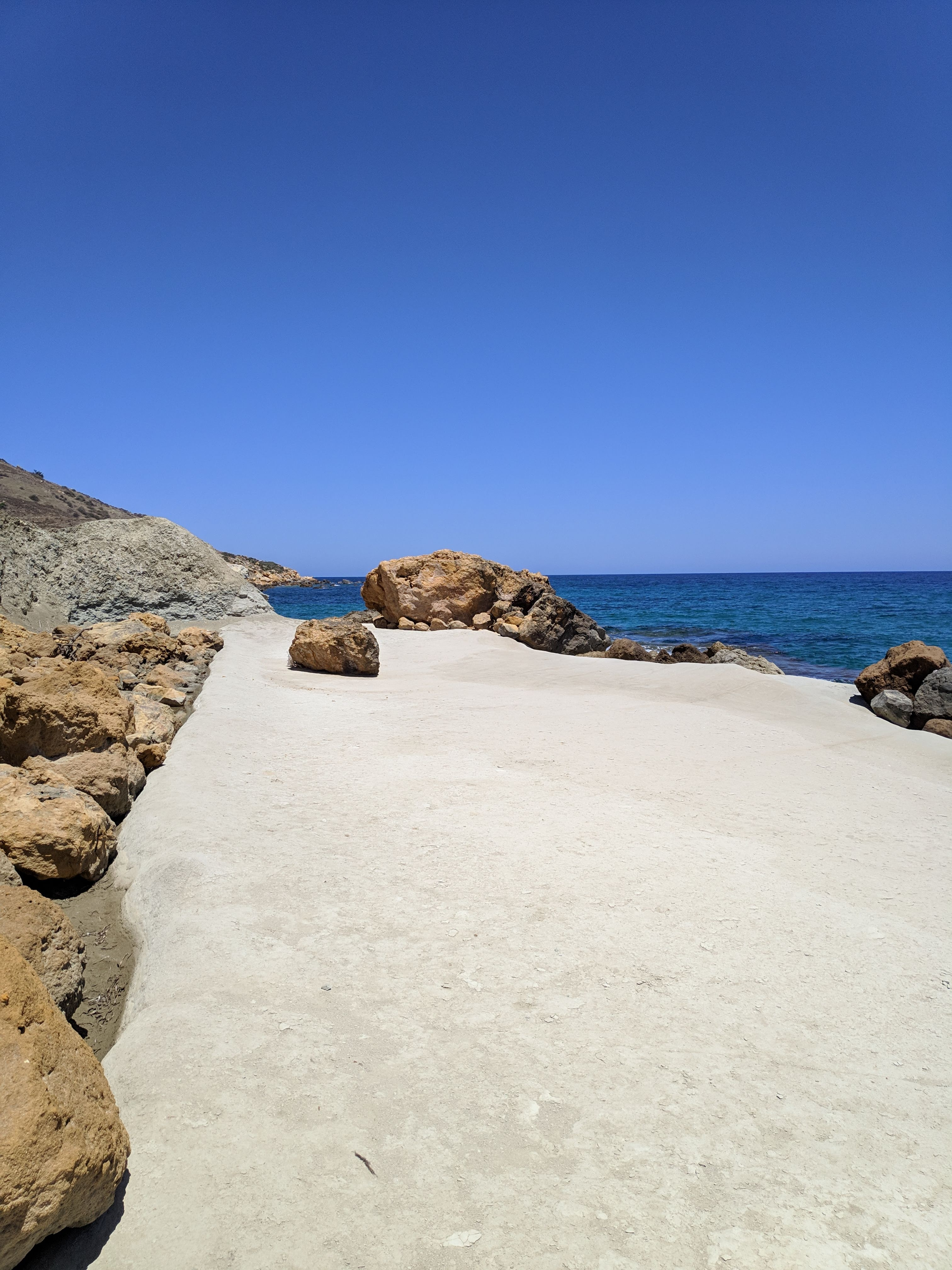
Flat terrain in Għajn Barrani

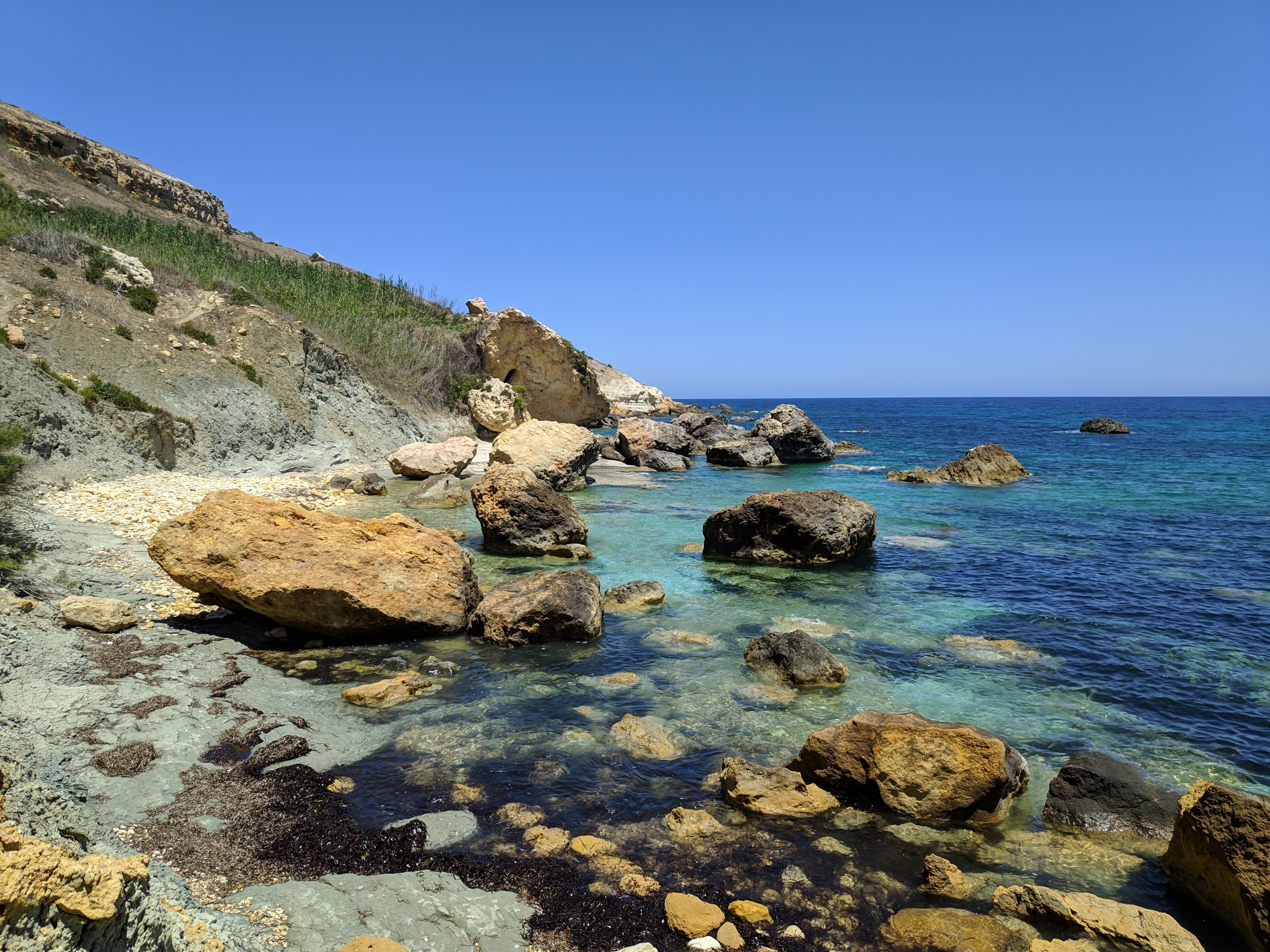
Landscape in Għajn Barrani

== See also ==
- Għajn Tuffieħa
