= Babu Valley =

Valley in Malta

- Wied Babu
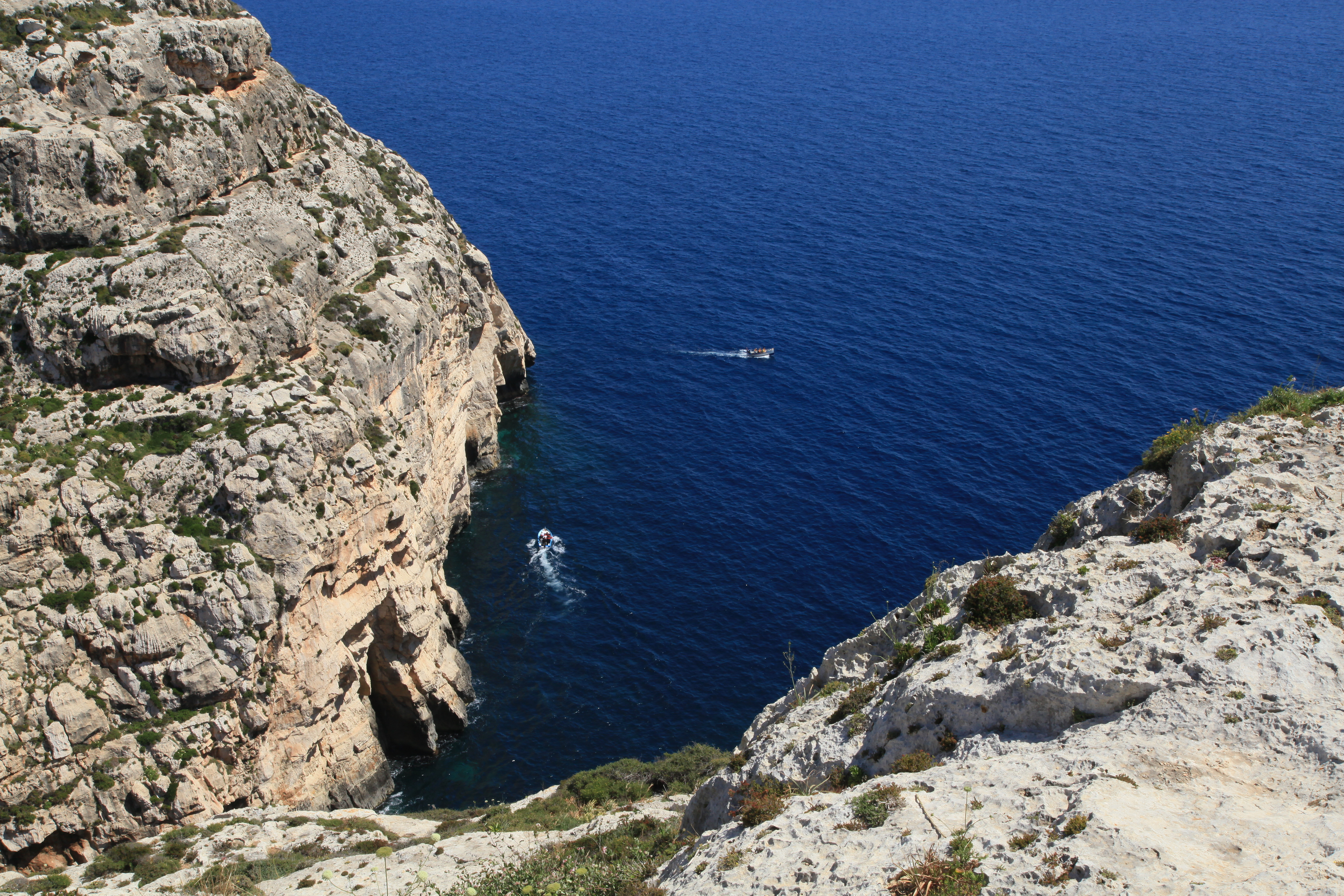
- Babu Valley as seen from its western flank.

- Location within Malta
- Floor elevation: 203 ft (62 m)
- Length: 0.91 km (0.57 mi)
- Width: 0.14 km (0.087 mi)
- Area: 0.06 km^{2} (0.023 mi^{2})

Geography
- Location: Malta
- Coordinates: 35°49′27″N 14°27′36″E
- Interactive map of Babu Valley

Babu Valley (Maltese: Wied Babu) is a small valley near Żurrieq, Malta. The valley is considered to be one of the most lushest in Malta and is a minor tourist attraction due to its vistas of the Blue Grotto. The valley is also known for its climbing and trekking sites. Certain parts of the valley were under controversy in 2019 after several reports stating that the entirety of the valley is privately owned surfaced.
