= Xrobb l-Għaġin =

Peninsula in southeastern Malta

Coordinates: 35°50′29″N 14°34′11″E

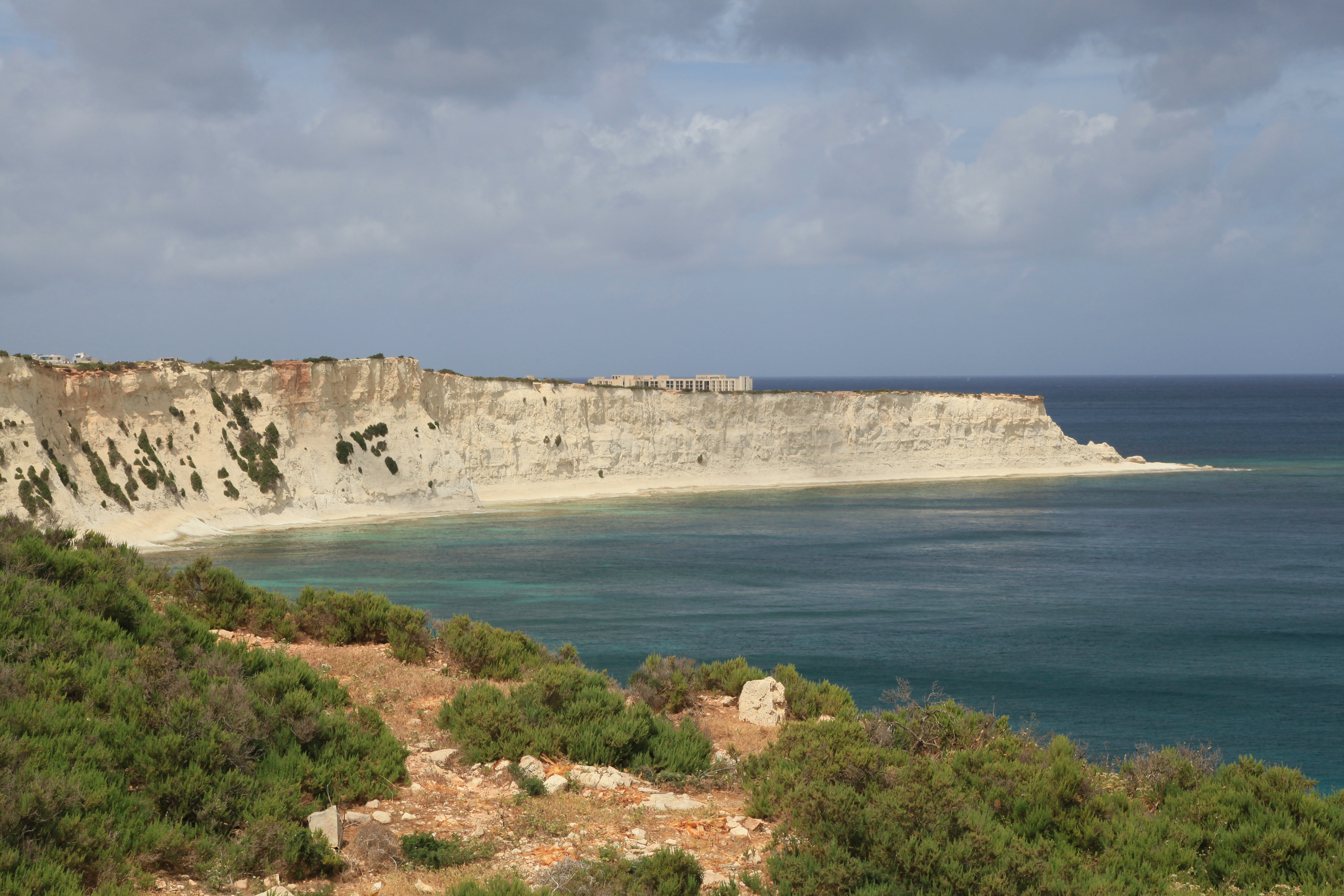
- Interactive map of Xrobb l-Għaġin

Geography
- Location: Marsaxlokk, Malta
- Area: 155,000 m^{2} (1,670,000 sq ft)
- Length: 650 m (2130 ft)
- Width: 172–329 m (564–1,079 ft)
- Coastline: 2,169 m (7116 ft)
- Highest elevation: 32 m (105 ft)

Administration
- Malta
- Capital city: Valletta

Additional information
- Time zone: UTC+1

Xrobb L-Għagin is an area in southeastern Malta. It is mostly known due to the nature park located inside its boundaries which goes by the same name. It is also home to Xrobb l-Għaġin Tower, which is a ruined De Redin watchtower. The peninsula was also home to a Deutsche Welle relay station (Delimara Transmitting Station) which later became the nature park main building.

== Xrobb l-Għaġin Temple ==
The temple of Xrobb l-Għaġin is also located in Xrobb l-Għaġin, it being the ruins of a Megalithic temple with its earliest remains dating to 4000BC. As these remains are located on the rapidly deteriorating cliff-side, efforts are currently being made to restore and protect them from future erosion. Solutions including the removal of certain structures to make them accessible somewhere else have been explored. The temple complex was first identified in 1913 by Temi Zammit and Thomas Ashby, then being excavated between 1914 and 1915. Investigations which occurred exactly one hundred years later, in 2015 have shown that there are still significant remains of the temple. The structure followed the typical plan of other Maltese Temples containing a paved court with an inner passage leading to four apices. The temple is oriented towards the southeast.

== Xrobb L-Għaġin as a nature park ==
On a protruding peninsula, the Xrobb l-Gain Nature Park and Sustainable Development Centre spans over 155,000 square metres (38 acres). The project's goal is to increase the use of renewable energy, manage wastewater, and protect biodiversity via teaching, demonstration, and research in sustainable environment solutions. A wildlife rehabilitation center was planned to be set up in the park. The park's main building complex also houses a hostel with around 30 beds. As part of its environmental protection policies, Xrobb l-Għaġin was home to an oil spill response training organized by Birdlife Malta.

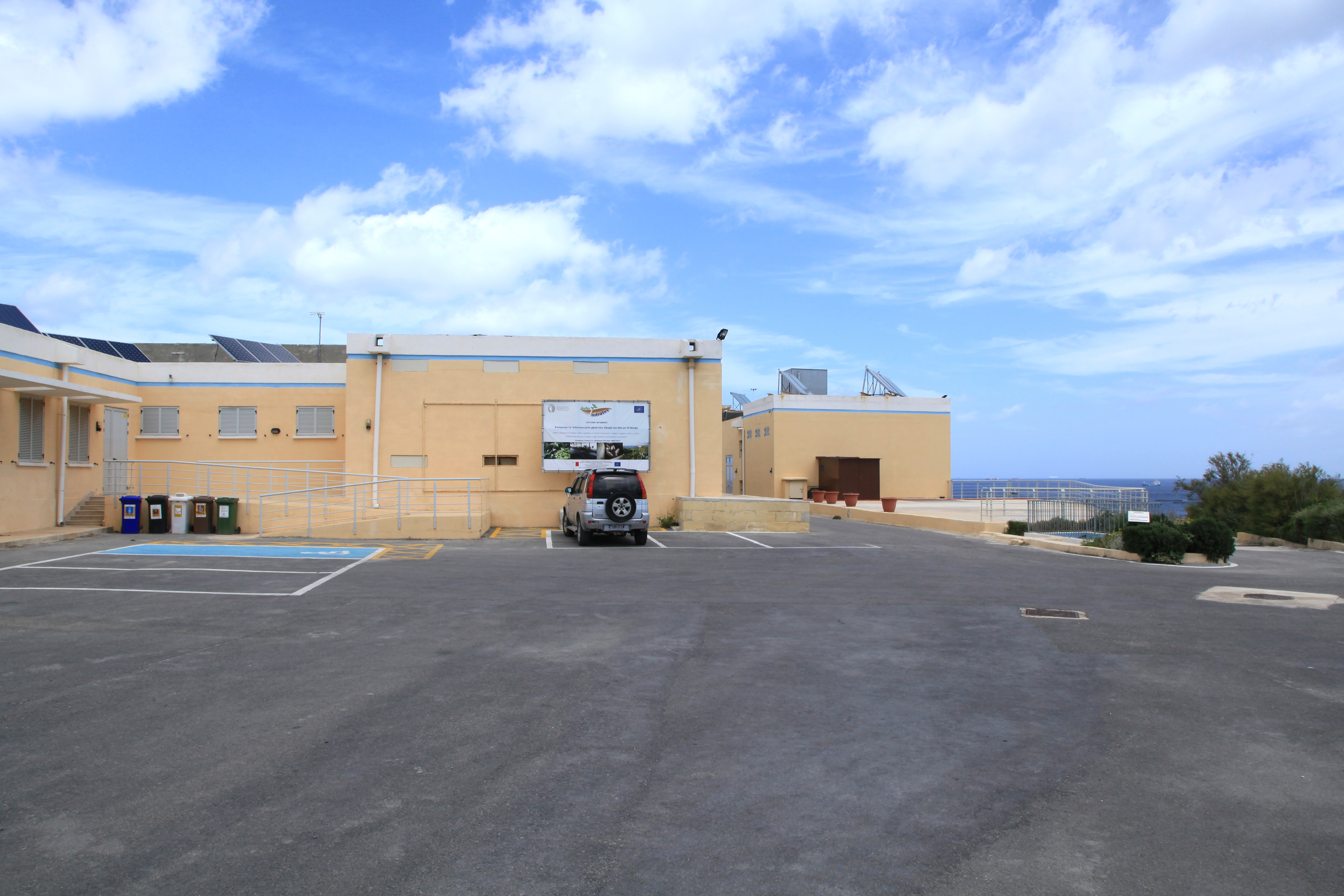
The nature park's building complex
