= Golden Bay (Malta) =

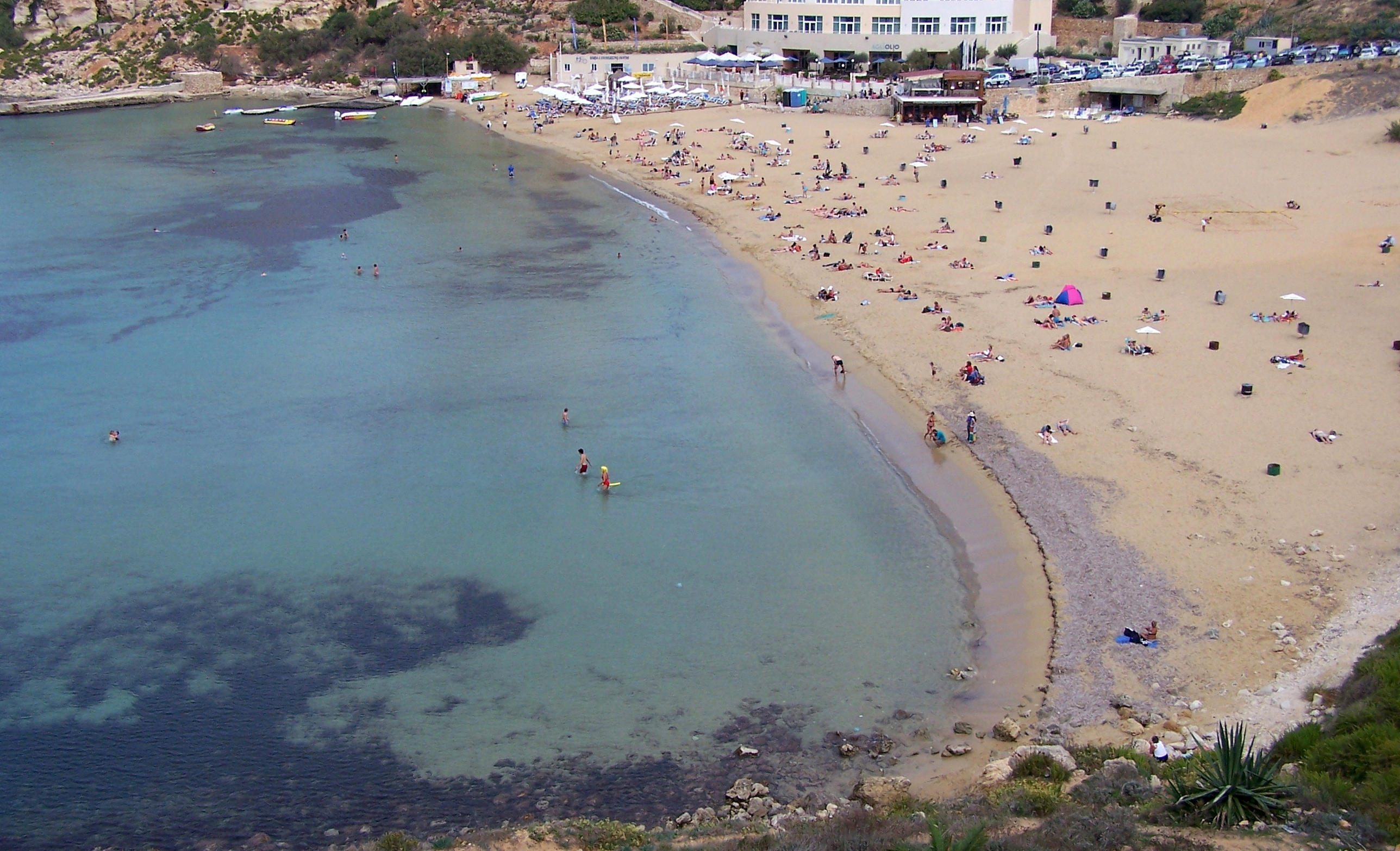

- Location of the bay in Malta
- Location: Malta
- Group: Mediterranean Sea
- Coordinates: 35.934°N 14.343°E
- Type: Bay
- Basin countries: Malta
- Surface elevation: 0 metres (0 ft)

Golden Bay (Maltese: Il-Mixquqa) is one of the bays and sand beaches in Malta. It was previously known as Military Bay. The white beach slopes gently allowing swimmers to easily walk into the sea. In summer months, there are lifeguards on duty. Golden Bay is the most popular tourist beach of the Manikata region. Several beach clubs and a large hotel are located on the beach. The Ghajn Tuffieha International Scout Campsite is also located nearby offering an all-year-round camping experience for everyone. A bus terminus and car park are located at Golden Bay.

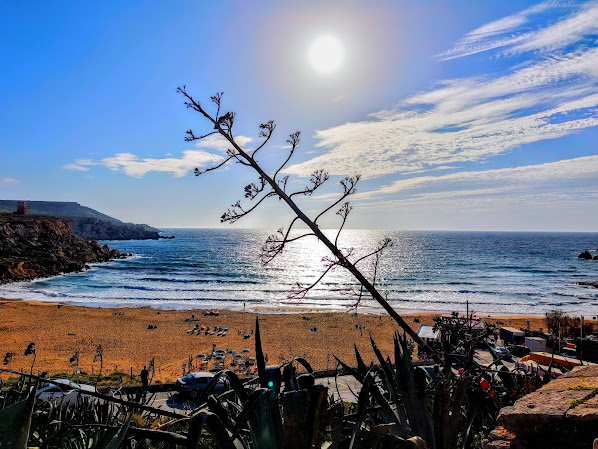
A weathered agave or century plant cactus stands sentinel on the golden sands of Golden Bay, Malta, offering a unique contrast between the arid and the aquatic.
