= St Peter's Pool, Malta =

Bay on the island of Malta

St Peter's Pool
- Peter's Pool
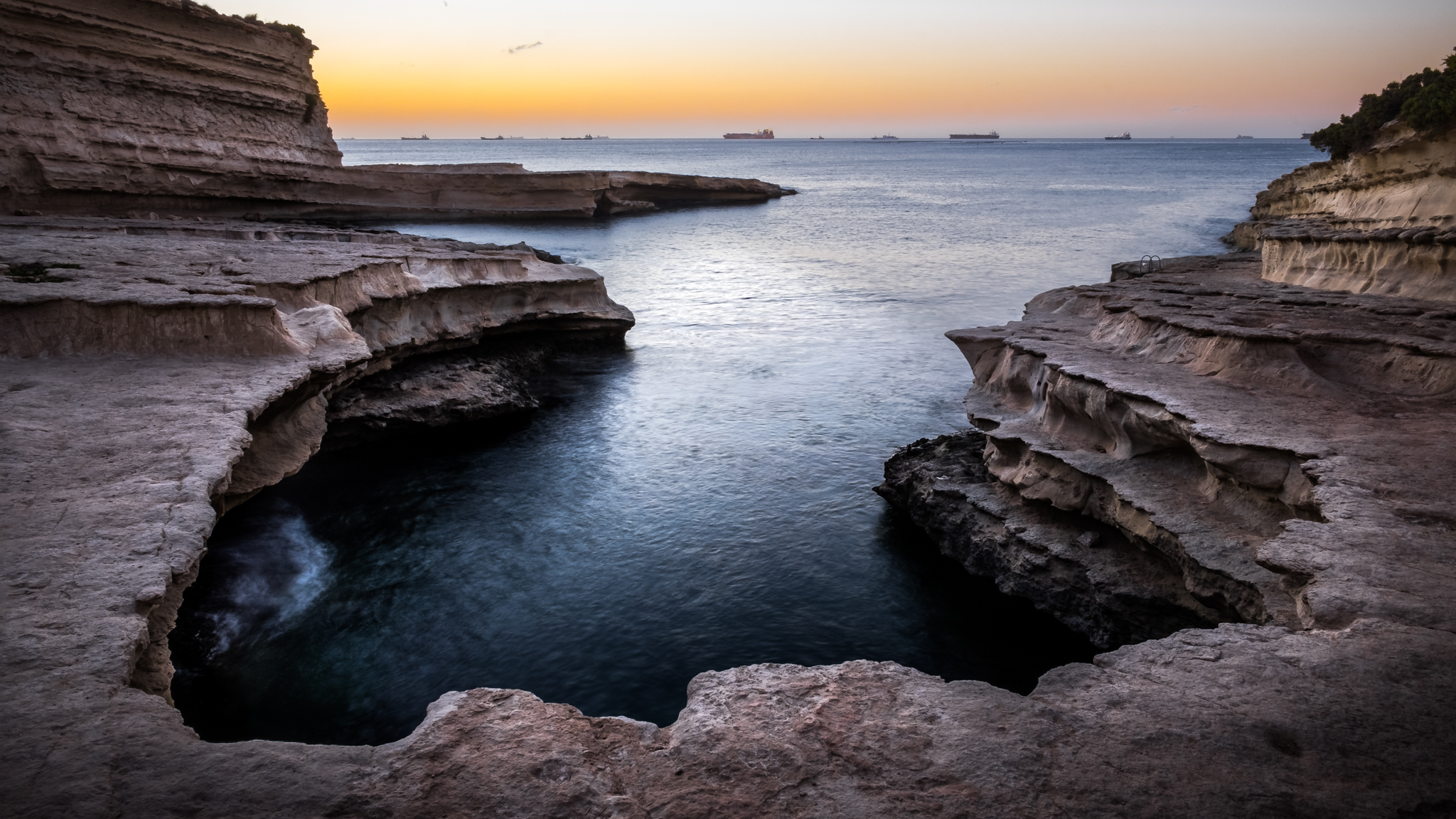

- Location within Malta
- Location: Delimara, Malta
- Coordinates: 35°49′58″N 14°33′45″E
- Max. length: 0.011 km (0.0068 mi)
- Max. width: 0.06 km (0.037 mi)
- Surface area: 4,357 m^{2} (46,900 sq ft)
- Shore length^{1}: 31 km (19 mi)
- ^{1} Shore length is not a well-defined measure.

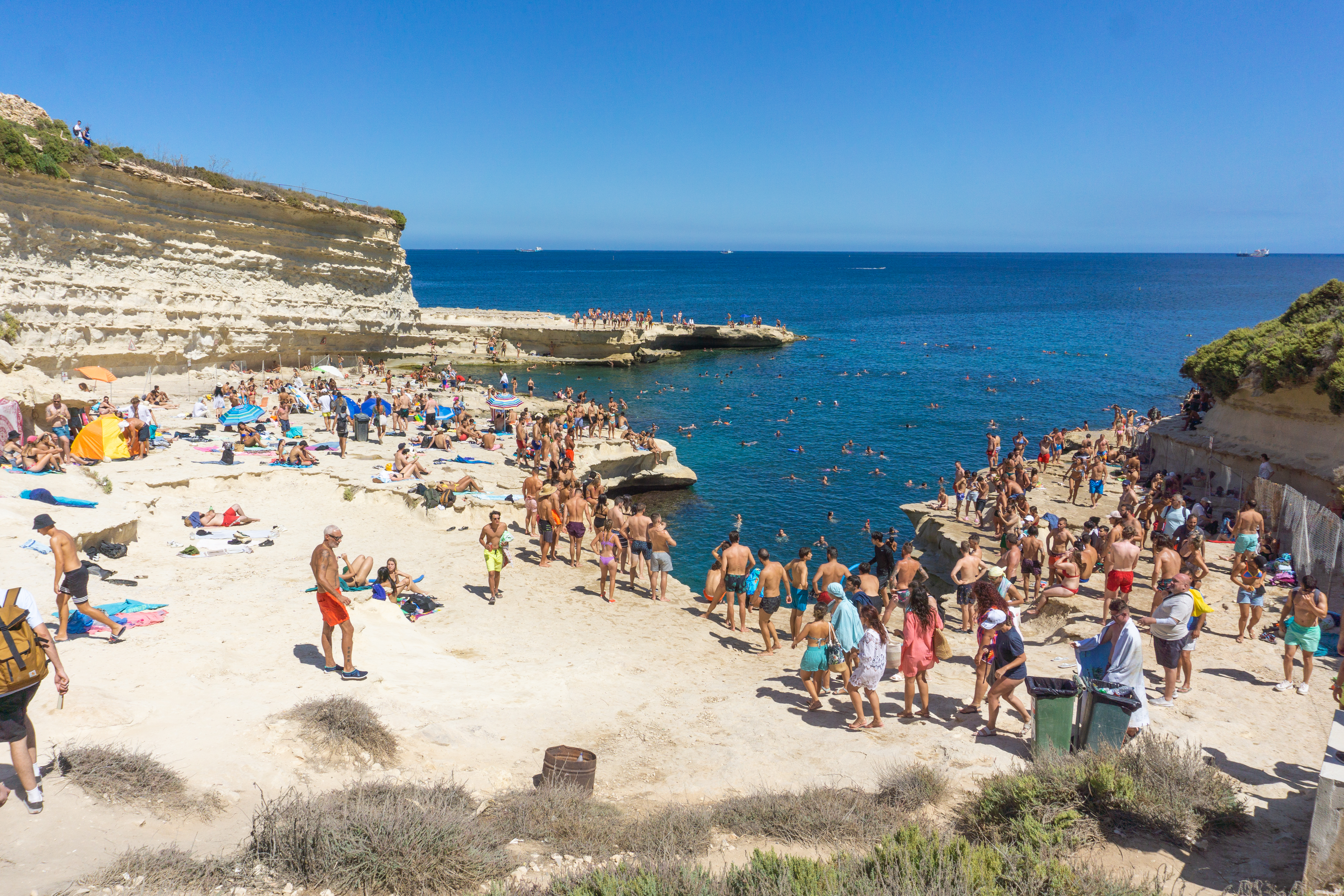
Beachgoers at St. Peter's Pool during summer

St Peter's Pool (Official: Peter's Pool), (Maltese: Il-Bajja ta' Pietru) is a small bay on the island of Malta. It is located on the North Eastern point of the Dellimara Peninsula. The bay is a common attraction among tourists looking to snorkel. A small cave can also be found on western end of the bay. As of 2022 several fences and warning signs have been put up warning the visitors of falling debris from the eroding cliffs surrounding the bay.

A diving dog called Titti once appeared jumping into the water with its owner Carmelo Abela at St. Peter's Pool, creating an internet sensation. In the aftermath of the video shared online, visitors from all over the world have been enticed to visit the pool and perhaps even see the dog themselves. Although Titti died in 2019, a new dog named Tina has made waves online by demonstrating her impressive jumping ability.

Around St. Peter's Pool are several historic landmarks to walk around and visit. Only a couple are actually open to the public.

- Marsaxlokk Fishing Village - A very popular tourist attraction known for traditional boats, markets, and seafood.
- Tas-Silġ Archaeological Complex - A site spanning 4,000 years from 3,000 B.C. to 900 A.D.
- Tas Silġ Church - Known as the Church of Our Lady of the Snows, built in 1650.
- The Delimara Lighthouse 1854 - Today run by Din l-Art Ħelwa, National Trust of Malta.
- Delimara Fort - A British structure that was built between 1876 and 1878.
- Saint Lucian Tower - Built between 1610 and 1611, the tower is now the Malta Aquaculture Research Centre.
- Il-Ħofra Il-Kbira and Il-Ħofra Iż-Żgħira - These are two natural bays.
- Il-Kalanka Bay (Delimara Point) - A popular swimming location.
