= Għar Qawqla =

Limestone formation off Marsalforn on the island of Gozo in Malta

Coordinates: 36°04′27″N 14°15′45″E

Għar Qawla
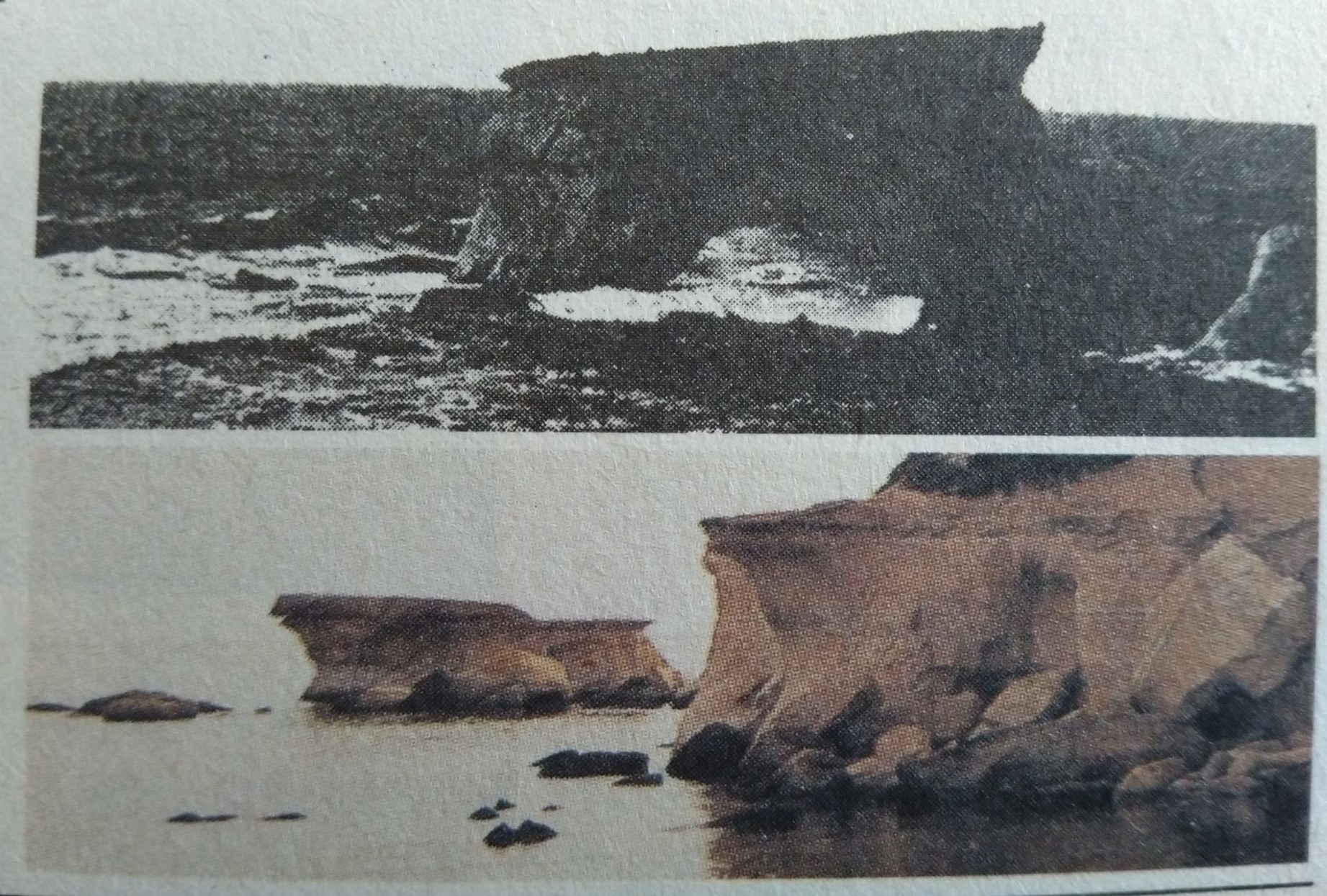
- Top to bottom: Before and after the collapse

Geography
- Archipelago: Maltese Archipelago
- Area: 190.34 m^{2} (2,048.8 sq ft)
- Length: 17.65 m (57.91 ft)
- Width: 1.72–13.44 m (5 ft 8 in – 44 ft 1 in)
- Highest elevation: 4 m (13 ft)

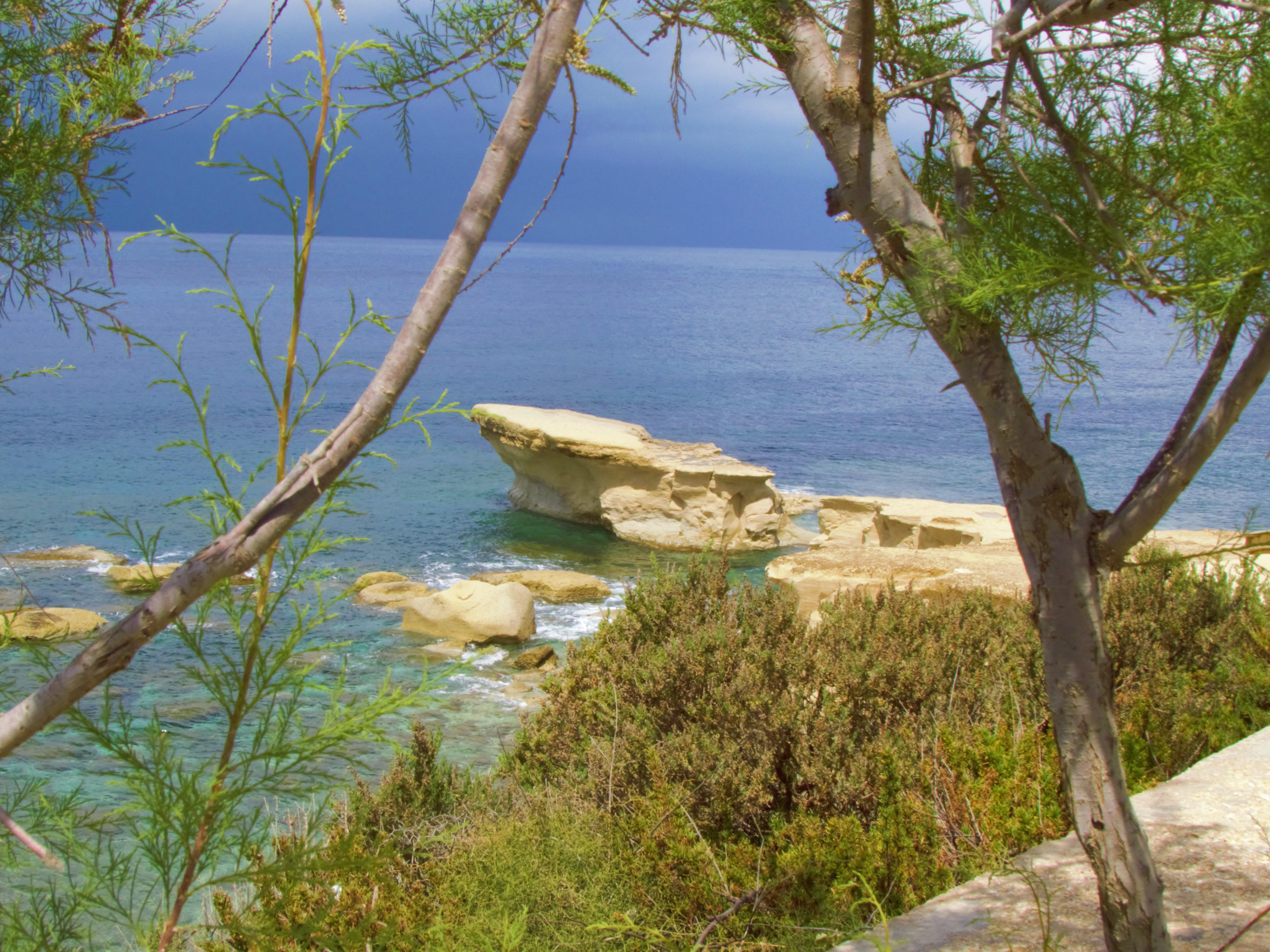
Għar Qawqla

Għar Qawqla is a limestone formation located off Marsalforn on the island of Gozo in Malta. It was formerly a natural arch connected to the mainland, but the span collapsed at some point during the 20th century. It has been speculated that the name Marsalforn might be partially derived from forna, referring to the natural sea caves of the area, of which Għar Qawqla was one of the best-known. The formations stands about 7.9 metres (26 ft) off the shore.

Today, all that remains of the arch is a 3-metre-tall (9.8 ft) pillar, from which both locals and tourists often jump into the sea. A shallow natural pool is located nearby. The area is also a diving site. It is mostly used for training purposes since it has been described as "not inspiring".

== See also ==
- Azure Window
- Wied il-Mielaħ Window
