= San Lawrenz =

- Local council
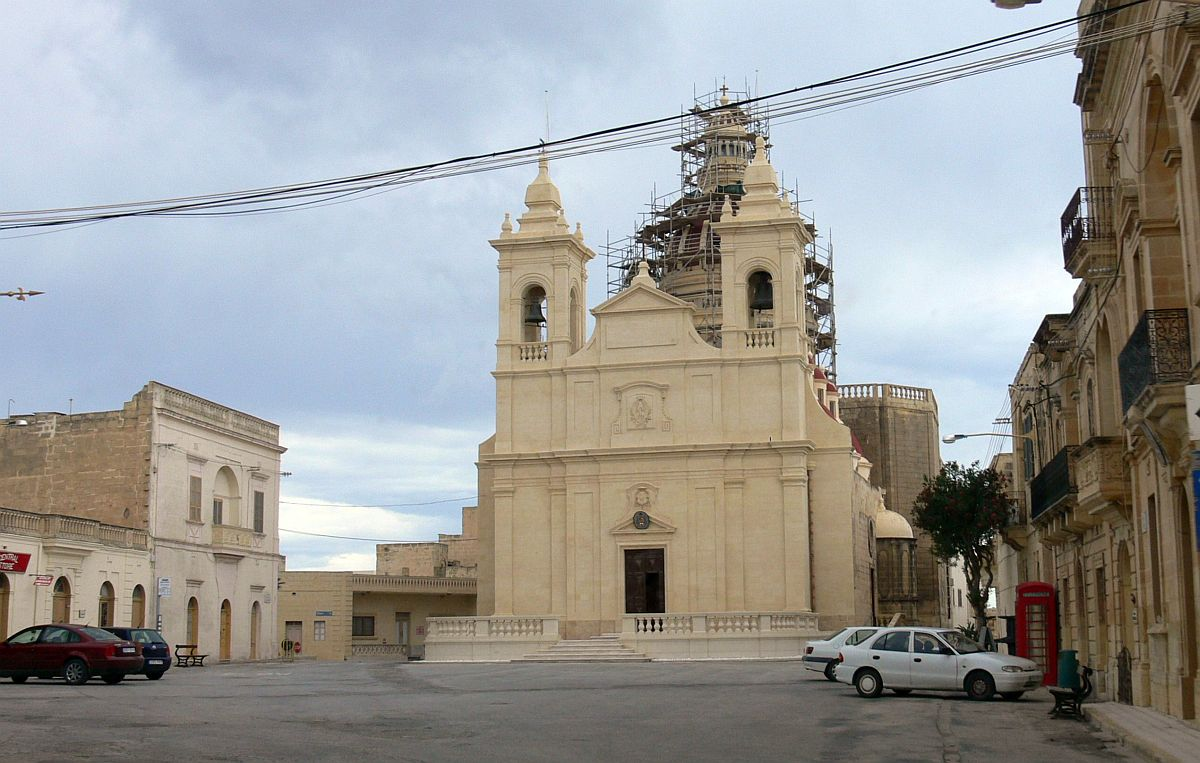
- San Lawrenz parish church

- Flag Coat of arms

- Coordinates: 36°3′18″N 14°12′15″E
- Country: Malta
- Region: Gozo Region
- District: Gozo and Comino District
- Borders: Kerċem, Għarb

Government
  - Mayor: Noel Formosa (PN)

Area
  - Total: 3.6 km^{2} (1.4 sq mi)

Population (July 2024)
  - Total: 807
  - Density: 220/km^{2} (580/sq mi)
- Demonym(s): Lawrenzjan (m), Lawrenzjana (f), Lawrenzjani (pl)
- Time zone: UTC+1 (CET)
  - Summer (DST): UTC+2 (CEST)
- Postal code: SLZ
- Dialing code: 356
- ISO 3166 code: MT-50
- Patron saint: St. Lawrence
- Day of festa: 10 August
- Website: Official website

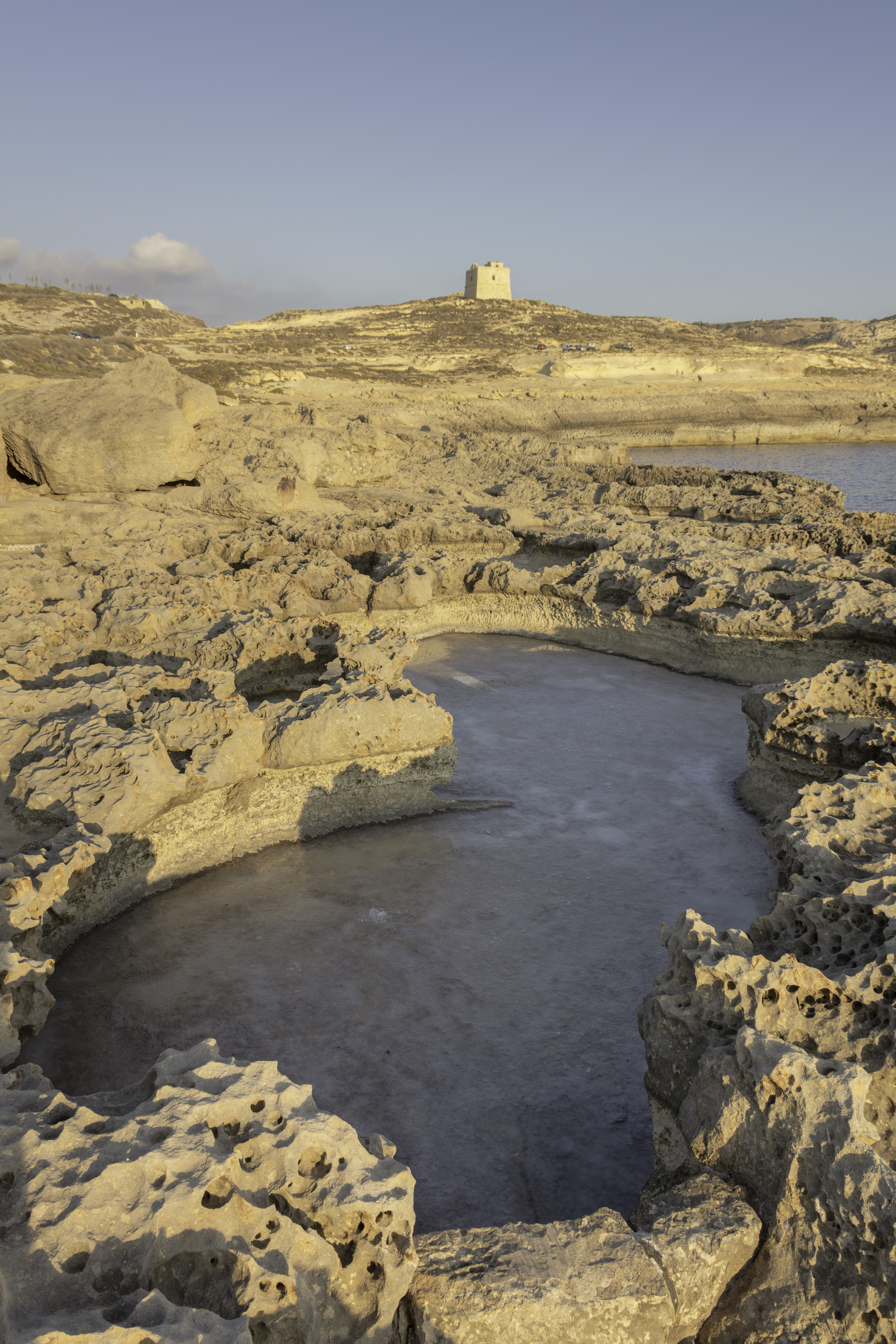
Coast of San Lawrenz with the Dwejra Tower in the back.

San Lawrenz is an administrative unit of Malta, on the island of Gozo. Its name is derived from Lawrence of Rome who is the patron saint for the locality. The population of San Lawrenz was 807 in July 2024. This included 409 males and 398 females; 609 Maltese nationals and 198 foreign nationals.

The Dwejra nature reserve is administratively part of the town. Prominent in the reserve is the Fungus Rock, and formerly also the Azure Window landmark before its collapse on March 8, 2017.

== Overview ==
It is built on a plain surrounded by three hills, Għammar, Gelmus and Ta' Dbieġi. The latter, Ta' Dbieġi, rises 195 metres above sea level and is Gozo's highest point.

San Lawrenz was established a parish on 15 March 1893. Before this date, the area was known as Ta' Ċangura.

Until San Lawrenz was declared a parish in 1893, it formed part of the neighbourhood of Għarb.

With a population of 748 people (as of March 2014), it is the second least populated village on Gozo and third least in all of the Maltese Islands. The village's football team is called St. Lawrence Spurs.

== Twin towns – sister cities ==
San Lawrenz is twinned with:

- Colle Umberto, Italy

== See also ==
- Gozo farmhouses
