= Inland Sea, Gozo =

Seawater lagoon on Gozo, Malta

Inland Sea
- Qawra
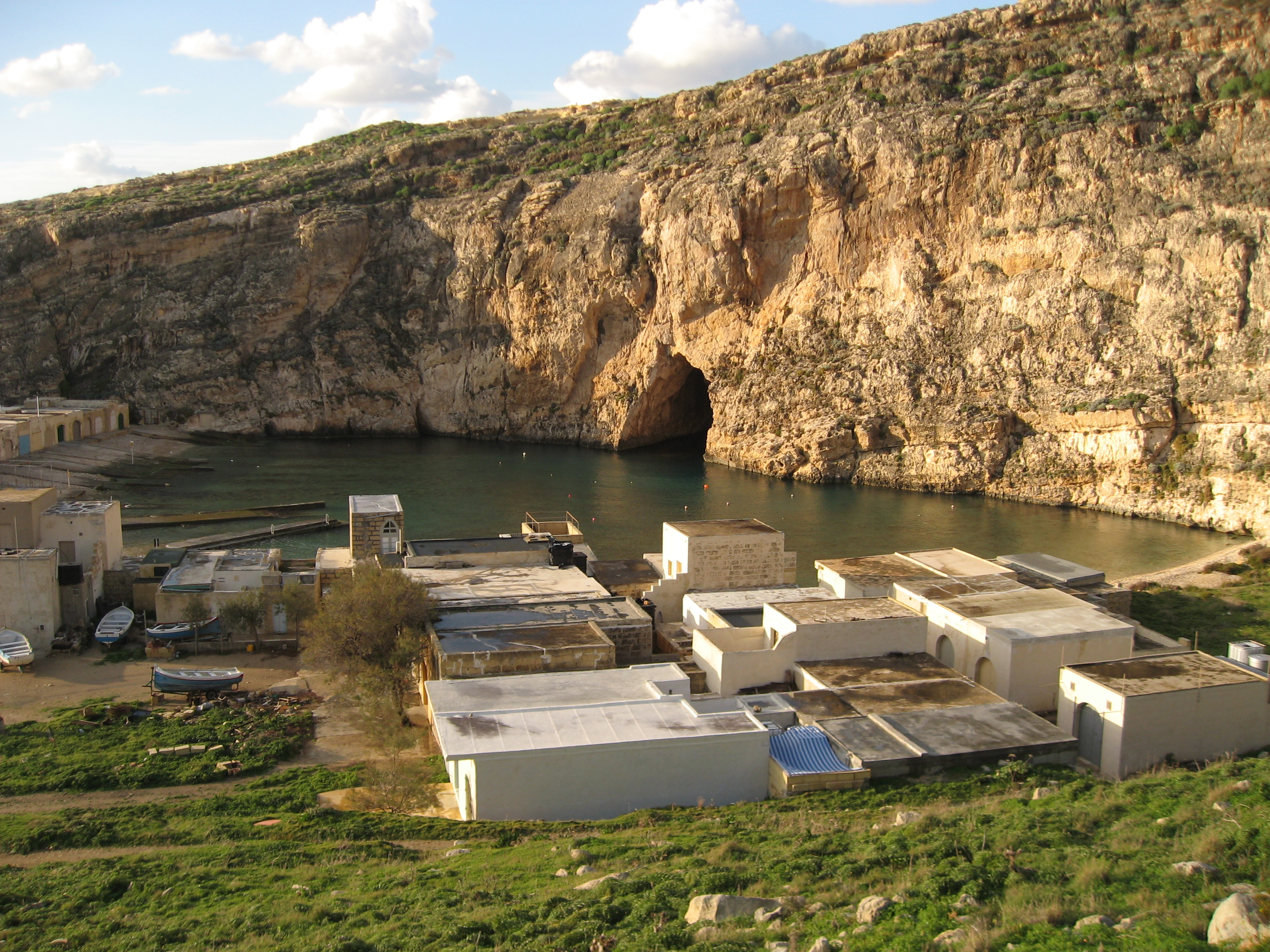
- The Inland Sea in 2016

- Location of the Inland Sea in Malta
- Location: Gozo, Malta
- Coordinates: 36°03′14″N 14°11′28″E
- Type: Lagoon
- Part of: Mediterranean Sea
- Basin countries: Malta
- Max. length: 119 metres (390 ft)
- Max. width: 81 metres (266 ft)
- Surface area: 6,652 square metres (71,600 sq ft)
- Average depth: 2 metres (6.6 ft)
- Max. depth: 26 metres (85 ft)
- Shore length^{1}: 330.53 metres (1,084.4 ft)
- ^{1} Shore length is not a well-defined measure.

The Inland Sea, sometimes called Il-Qawra in Maltese and also known as Dwejra, is a lagoon of seawater on the island of Gozo linked to the Mediterranean Sea through an opening formed by a narrow natural arch.

It was probably formed where a geological fault in the limestone had created a sea cave and the roof then collapsed.

On one side there is a gently shelving stony beach with several fishermen's huts. The boats are often pulled up on to the stony beach. The bottom of the lagoon is also mostly pebbles and rocks and is fairly shallow. Exiting through the tunnel towards open sea, the floor drops away in a series of shelves to a depth of up to 35 meters on the outside. It is reported that Jacques Cousteau said the Inland Sea was among his top ten dives.

On calm days fishing boats, known in Maltese as luzzijiet, can pass through the tunnel. Some of the boats are used to take visitors through the archway and then for a tour of the nearby cliffs and other sites, mainly to the Fungus Rock and to the site of the former large natural arch in the cliffs called the Azure Window.

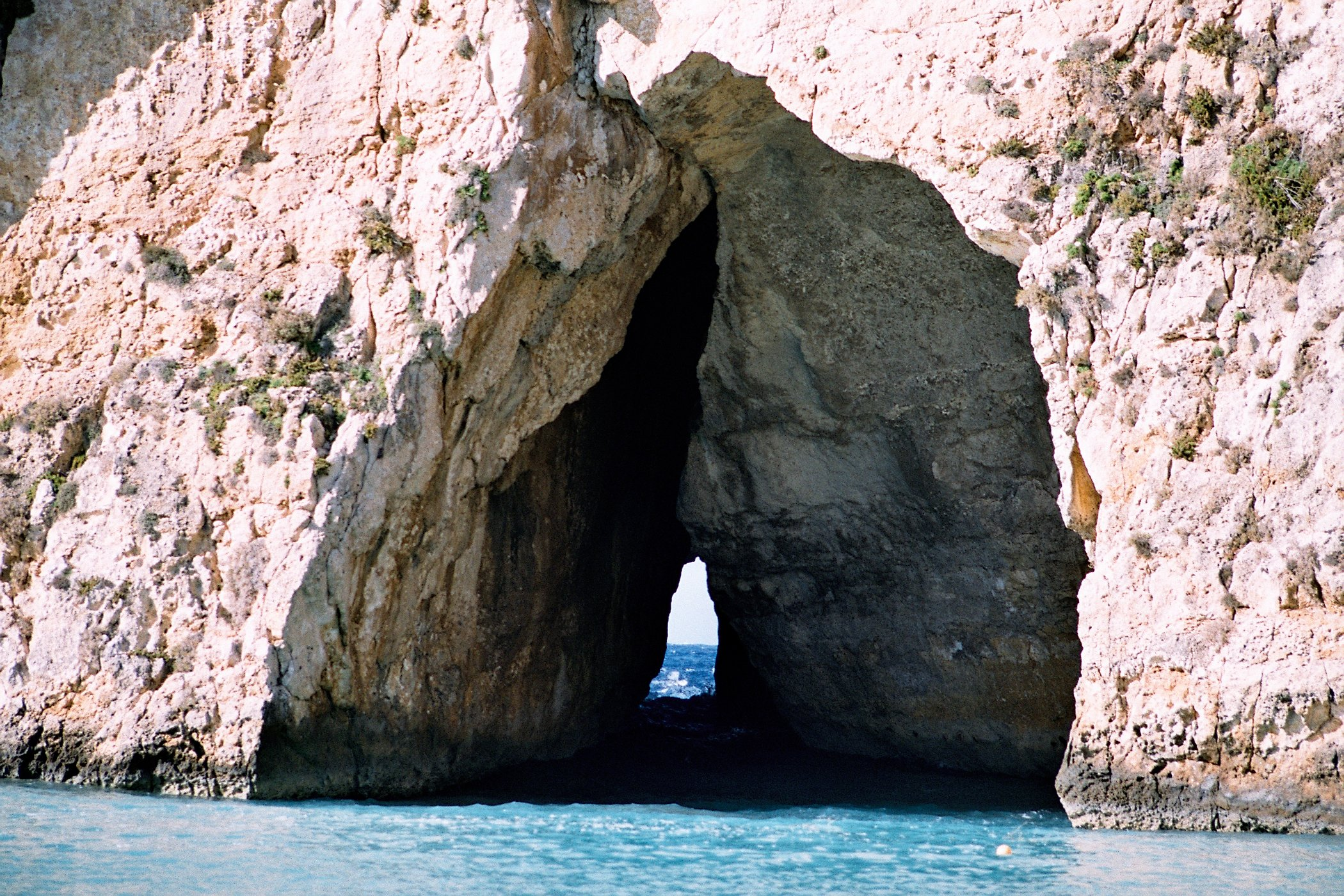
Connection between the Inland Sea and the open Mediterranean in February, 2007
