= Gozo =

Island of the Maltese archipelago in the Mediterranean Sea

Native name: Għawdex Nickname: Il-Gżira tat-tliet għoljiet / Isle of Calypso
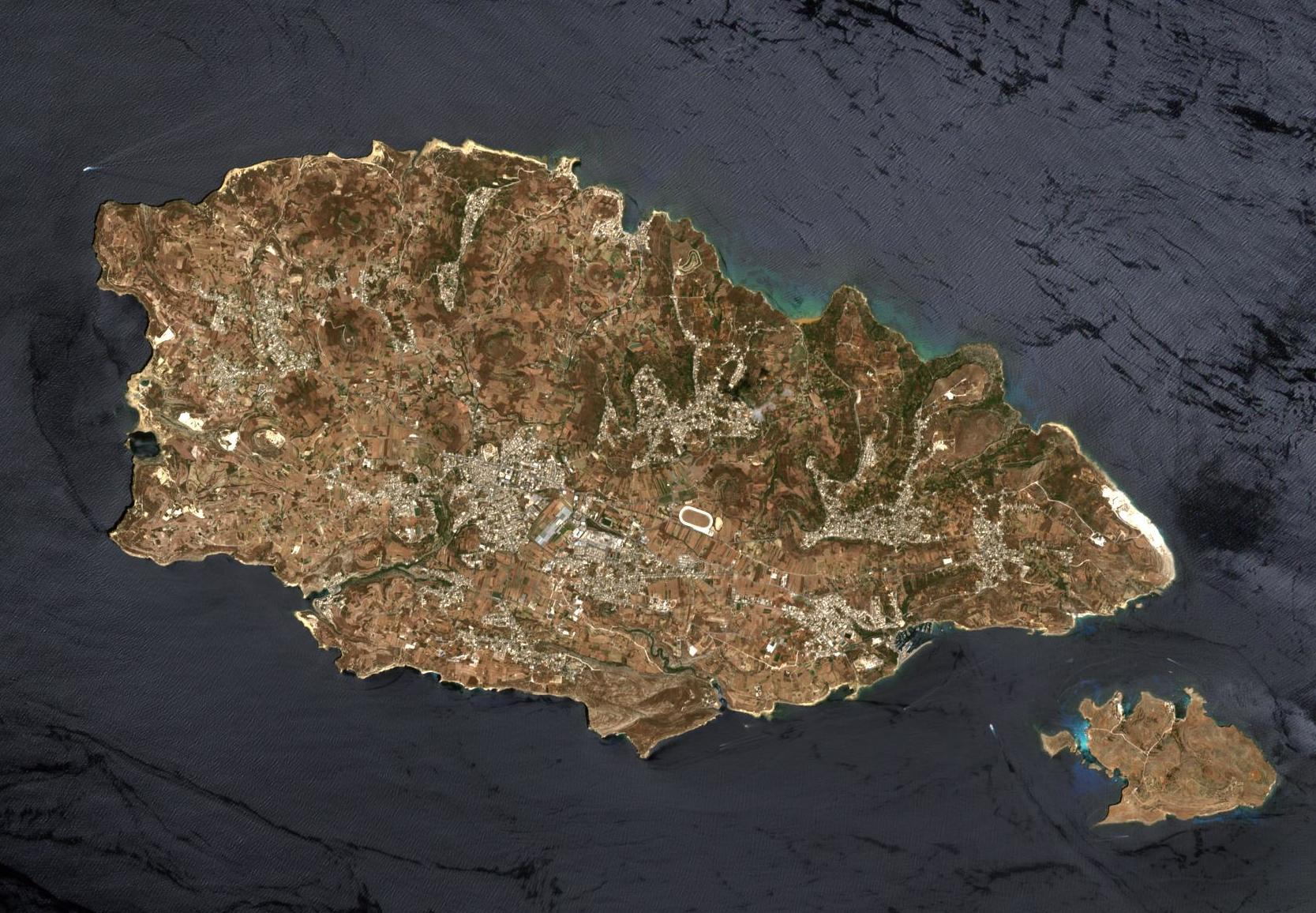
- Satellite view of Gozo and adjacent Comino

- Map of Maltese islands highlighting Gozo

Geography
- Location: South of Sicily, Mediterranean Sea
- Coordinates: 36°03′N 14°15′E
- Archipelago: Maltese islands
- Area: 67 km^{2} (26 sq mi)
- Length: 13.34 km (8.289 mi)
- Width: 7.15 km (4.443 mi)

Administration
- Malta
- Largest settlement: Victoria (Note: De facto capital of Gozo.) (pop. 7,242)
- Minister for Gozo: Clint Camilleri (PL)

Demographics
- Demonym: Gozitans
- Population: ▲39,287 (2021)
- Pop. density: 557/km^{2} (1443/sq mi)
- Languages: Maltese (National/Official), English (Official)
- Ethnic groups: Maltese people

Gozo (Note: /ˈɡoʊzoʊ/ GOH-zoh, US also /ˈɡɔːdzoʊ, ˈɡɔːtsoʊ/ GAWD-zoh, GAWT-soh.) (Maltese: Għawdex [ˈɐːˤʊ̯dɛʃ]), known in antiquity as Gaulos, (Note: Punic: 𐤂𐤅𐤋, romanized: gwl; Ancient Greek: Γαῦλος, romanized: Gaúlos.) is an island in the Maltese archipelago in the Mediterranean Sea. The island is part of the Republic of Malta. After the island of Malta itself, it is the second-largest island in the archipelago.

As of 2021, the island has a population of around 39,287 (out of Malta's total 443,227), and its inhabitants are known as Gozitans (Maltese: Għawdxin). It is rich in historic locations such as the Ġgantija temples, which, along with the other Megalithic Temples of Malta, are amongst the world's oldest free-standing structures.

The island is rural in character and less developed than the island of Malta. Gozo is known for its scenic hills, which are featured on its coat of arms. The Azure Window in Dwejra, San Lawrenz, a natural limestone arch, was a remarkable geological feature until its collapse on March 8, 2017. The island has other notable natural features, including the Inland Sea and Wied il-Mielaħ Window. There are a few sandy beaches on the island, namely Ramla Bay in Xagħra and Nadur, as well as seaside resorts that are popular with both locals and tourists, the most popular being Marsalforn and Xlendi. Gozo is considered one of the top diving destinations in the Mediterranean and a centre for water sports.

== Etymology ==
The name of the island in Maltese is Għawdex, itself descended from Arabic غَوْدَش (ḡawdaš), ultimately from the Phoenician root 𐤂-𐤅-𐤋 (g-w-l). In Classical times it was known as Gaulos (Γαῦλος in greek), later as Gaudos, from which the Arabic name derives.

== History ==
Flag of Gozo

Gozo has been inhabited since 5000 BC, when farmers from nearby Sicily crossed the sea to the island. Due to the discovery of similar pottery found in both places from the Għar Dalam phase, it has been suggested that the first colonists were specifically from the area of Agrigento; however, it is currently unknown exactly where in Sicily the farmers came from. They are thought to have first lived in caves on the outskirts of what is now San Lawrenz.

Gozo was an important place for cultural evolution, and during the Neolithic period the Ġgantija temples were built; they are amongst the world's oldest free-standing structures, as well as the world's oldest religious structures. The temple's name is Maltese for "belonging to the giants", because legend in Maltese and Gozitan folklore says the temples were built by giants. Another important Maltese archaeological site in Gozo, which dates back to the Neolithic period, is the Xagħra Stone Circle. Also, native tradition and certain ancient Greek historians (notably Euhemerus and Callimachus) maintain that Gozo is the island Homer described as Ogygia, home of the nymph Calypso. Diodorus Siculus writes that the island had many well harbours.

Gozo was occupied by the Carthaginians, who built a temple to Astarte on the islands. At some point in time most probably it fell to the Greeks, because of local coins on the island with the Greek inscription ΓΑΥΛΙΤΩΝ. It was probably annexed by Rome around 218 BC and minted its own bronze coins in the 1st century BC. These feature Astarte's head with a crescent obverse and a warrior, a star, and the legend Gaulitōn (Ancient Greek: ΓΑΥΛΙΤΩΝ) reverse.

In 1530, Holy Roman Emperor Charles V gifted the island along with Malta to the Knights Hospitalier.

In July 1551, the Ottomans under Sinan Pasha and Dragut invaded and ravaged Gozo, enslaving most of its 5,000 inhabitants, taking them to Tarhuna Wa Msalata in Libya. Their departure port in Gozo was Mġarr ix-Xini. The island of Gozo was repopulated between 1565 and 1580 by mainland Maltese, undertaken by the Knights of Malta.

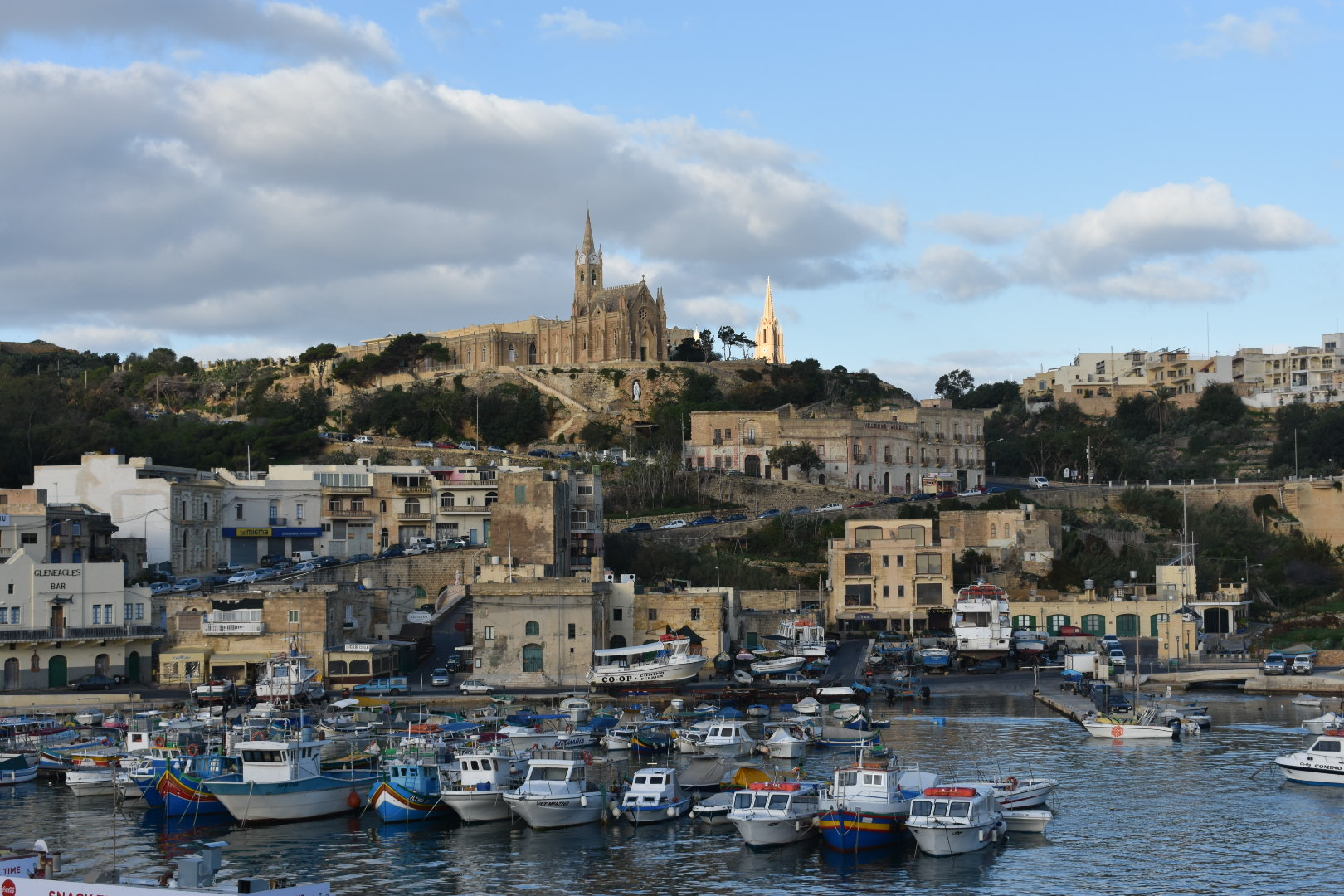
View of Mġarr Harbour from the Gozo Channel Line

The history of Gozo is strongly coupled with the history of Malta, since Gozo has been governed by Malta throughout history. The brief exception was following the French garrison's surrender to the British under Captain Alexander Ball on 28 October 1798 during the uprising against French forces after Napoleon's conquest of Malta. Gozo then enjoyed a short period of independence until the French garrison in Valletta surrendered on 4 September 1800. On that day both Malta and Gozo became a British Protectorate before becoming a Crown colony in 1813.

The Gozo Civic Council was set up as a statutory local government in the island of Gozo on 14 April 1961, the first experiment in civil local government in Malta since Gozo's short period of autonomy between 1798 and 1800. The law authorised the council to raise taxes, although it never actually made use of this power. In 1971, the Malta Labour Party was voted into office. As its support in Gozo was weak and it favoured a more centralised administration, it proposed a referendum on the abolition of the council, putting emphasis on the unpopular possibility of its raising taxes. In the Gozo Civic Council referendum, 1973, 76.97% voters voted for the abolition of the Gozo Civic Council.

In the mid-1980s, attempts were made to set up a Gozo committee, chaired by the prime minister and with the Gozitan members of Parliament as members. However, it was only in 1987 that the Ministry of Gozo was set up (demoted to a parliamentary secretariat between 1996 and 1998). Local government in the Gozitan localities was restored with the introduction of local councils in 1993 with Gozo having 14 councils.

== Religion ==
The island has its own Latin bishopric, the Roman Catholic Diocese of Gozo, the only suffragan of the Metropolitan Archbishop of Malta. Gozo contains a large number of Catholic churches. The Rotunda of Xewkija, in the village of Xewkija, has a capacity of 3,000, enough for the entire population of Xewkija village; its dome is larger than that of St Paul's Cathedral in London. The church bells are rung daily for the canonical hours Matins, Lauds, Terce, Sext, None and vespers. The most famous church on the island is the sanctuary of Ta' Pinu, near the village of Għarb, in the northwest of Gozo.

== Connection between Malta and Gozo ==
The islands have historically been connected by air and sea links. However, a helicopter service which connected the two ceased operations in 2006.

=== By ferry ===
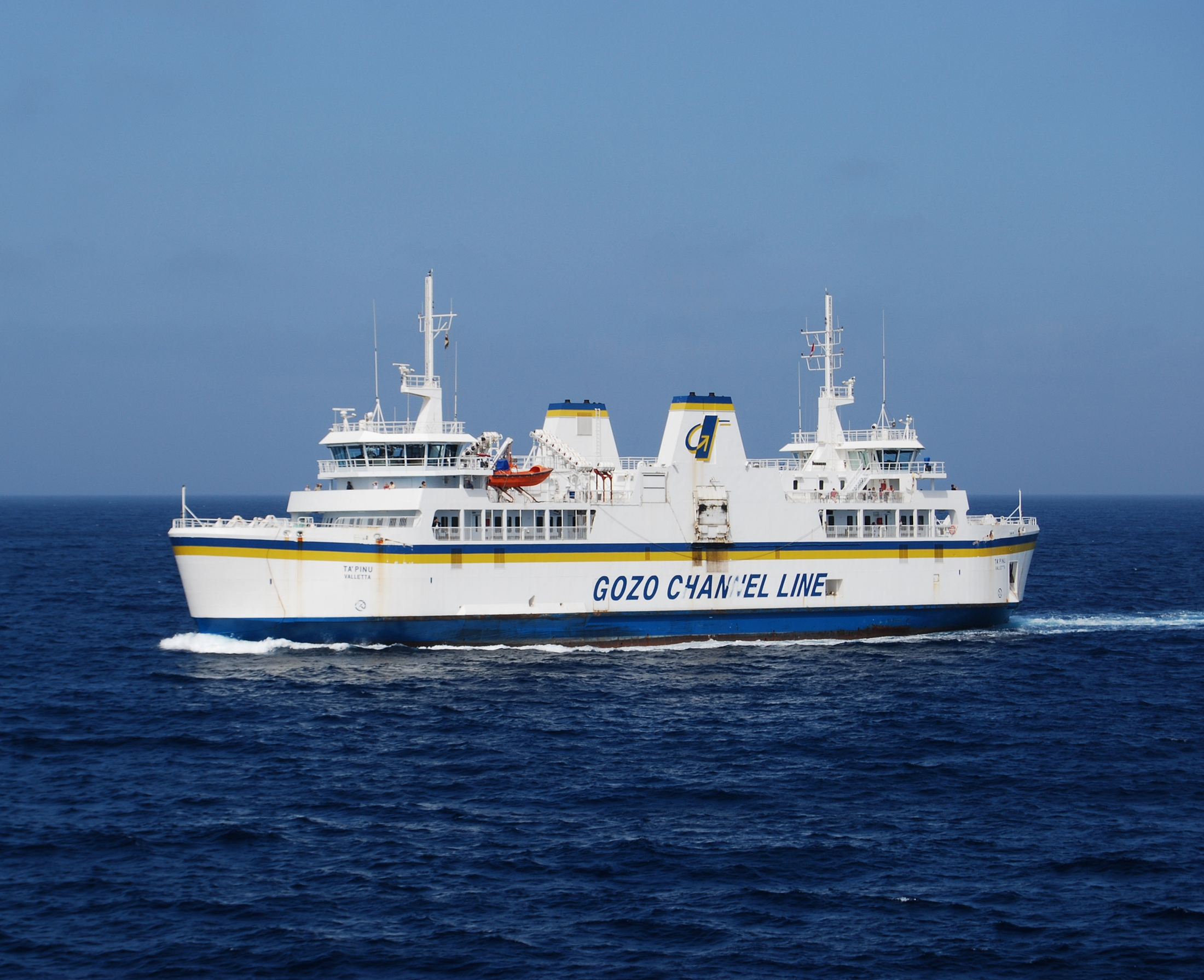
MV Ta' Pinu, one of the four ferries operated by the Gozo Channel Line, on its way from Gozo to Ċirkewwa.

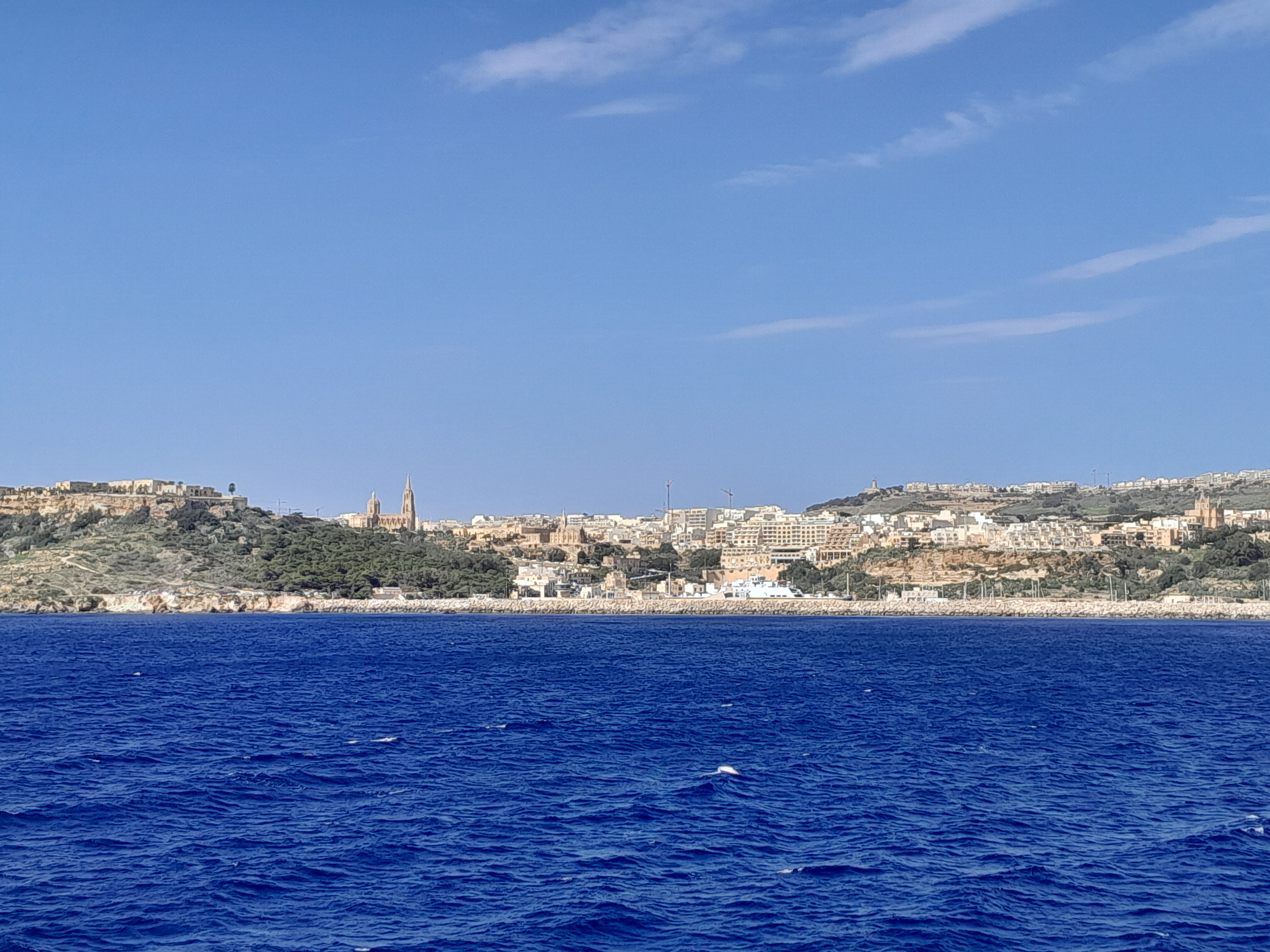
View of Mġarr, port of island of Gozo

Visitors can currently reach the island by ferry. There are regular crossings between the port of Mġarr on Gozo and Ċirkewwa on the northwest coast of Malta. The Gozo Channel Line makes the trip every 45 minutes during the summer and almost as often in the winter. A return journey costs €4.65 and takes around 25 minutes each way. The service is used by tourists and commuters (including Gozitan students who study at the University of Malta), and is also used to transport goods between the islands. Each year, the route is used by around 1.1 million cars, and many more foot passengers. On arrival at Mġarr, visitors can take one of the 'Hop On Hop Off' buses, which depart from outside the ferry terminal and operate on a timetable synchronised to the ferry timetables. Public buses, taxis and hire cars are also available.

Gozo Highspeed, an independently operated company, offers approximately 45-minute crossings between the port of Mġarr, Gozo and the Grand Harbour in Valletta, Bugibba and Sliema, all located on the northern-eastern coast of Malta.

=== Proposed links ===
==== Tunnel ====
Several proposals have been made to construct a road link between Malta and Gozo. In 1972 the newly elected Labour Party administration carried out a feasibility study that concluded building a bridge between the two islands was possible, but would have negative environmental effects. A tunnel was also considered, but found to be too expensive at the time. An online poll by The Times of Malta in 2006 found that 55% of respondents supported a road link.

In June 2013 a "mega Chinese state-owned company" China Communications Construction Corporation Limited will finance a €4 million study to assess the feasibility of a bridge between Malta and Gozo. "Depending on the feasibility of the tunnel and bridge projects, popular consultation will take place giving particular weight to what Gozitans have to say." "Gozo Minister Anton Refalo alluded to the possibility of calling a referendum to determine whether Gozitans prefer a tunnel or a bridge to connect Malta and Gozo".

The study found out that the bridge would take four years to build and construction would cost €1 billion. Apart from this, operation and maintenance costs are estimated to cost up to €4 million every year; China Communications Construction Corporation Limited proposed to build the bridge by 2020.

The idea of building a bridge is opposed by environmentalists and NGOs such as Din l-Art Ħelwa and Flimkien għal Ambjent Aħjar.

An 11 km underground sub-seabed tunnel has been proposed in a report on the viability of a Gozo-Malta tunnel link by the Gozo Business Chamber (GBC) together with Transport Malta (TM). The Gozo Business Chamber is organising a presentation by economist Gordon Cordina, of the detailed report about the feasibility of a 'Gozo-Malta Subsea Tunnel. In 2015, members from the GBC together with representatives from TM also visited Norway, where they spoke with experts, and toured several underwater tunnels.

In December 2015, a group of students joined forces to create 'Front Favur il-Mina' to support a permanently-connected, tunnel project between Malta and its sister island. Several MPs endorsed the group. A catamaran service (fast ferry) to Gozo, ferry trips from the Grand Harbour and ultimately a tunnel linking Malta with the sister island are the main proposals pushed forward by the pressure group. Addressing a conference in Gozo organised by the pro-tunnel movement, Joseph Muscat said "The government intends to move forward with a project linking the two islands." Furthermore, former opposition leader Simon Busuttil confirmed during the same conference, that the Nationalist Party was in favour of the project and willing to cooperate with the government.

The University of Malta carried out geological and geophysical investigations in connection with a proposed sub-sea tunnel between Malta and Gozo following an agreement with Transport Malta. Scientific investigations included both desktop and field studies, passive seismic measurements, bathymetric mapping, and a seismic study. The University of Malta conducted a marine baseline study which incorporated a geological model of topography, stratigraphy, structure, geological, geophysical and tectonic properties of the study area. During this phase of the study, scientists deployed a 300-metre-long cable with a series of specialised receptors. An 'air gun' released bursts of compressed air every few metres. The compressed air was reflected to the receptors. Different geological layers reflect different frequencies. Scientists could thus determine the geological formations that lie beneath the surface and determine possible cracks. Following such tests, more tests will be carried out; these will consist in the drilling of a series of boreholes, up to 200 metres below the sea bed, to determine the rock strata below the surface.

==== Catamaran ====
"Expressions of interest have been issued for a fast catamaran service between Gozo and Valletta as well as between Gozo and Sicily." In June 2013, the services would be aimed for use by both tourists and the Maltese and would involve public service obligations.

==== Air ====
An airstrip for fixed-wing aircraft on Gozo was proposed in the 1990s, but rejected for environmental reasons. In June 2013 the government announced a plan "to issue a call for expressions of interest for the operation of a scheduled air service between Malta and Gozo".

== Transportation within Gozo ==
=== On foot ===
Many of the distances within villages are negligible and some of the roads are fairly quiet to walk along. However, there is often heavy traffic in the capital, Victoria and between Victoria and Mġarr. There is also a footpath network, although the paths require good shoes and are not always clearly marked on the ground. There are longer distances if travelling between different villages, ranging from 1 to 5 km (1 to 3 mi) from one village to the next.

=== By bus ===
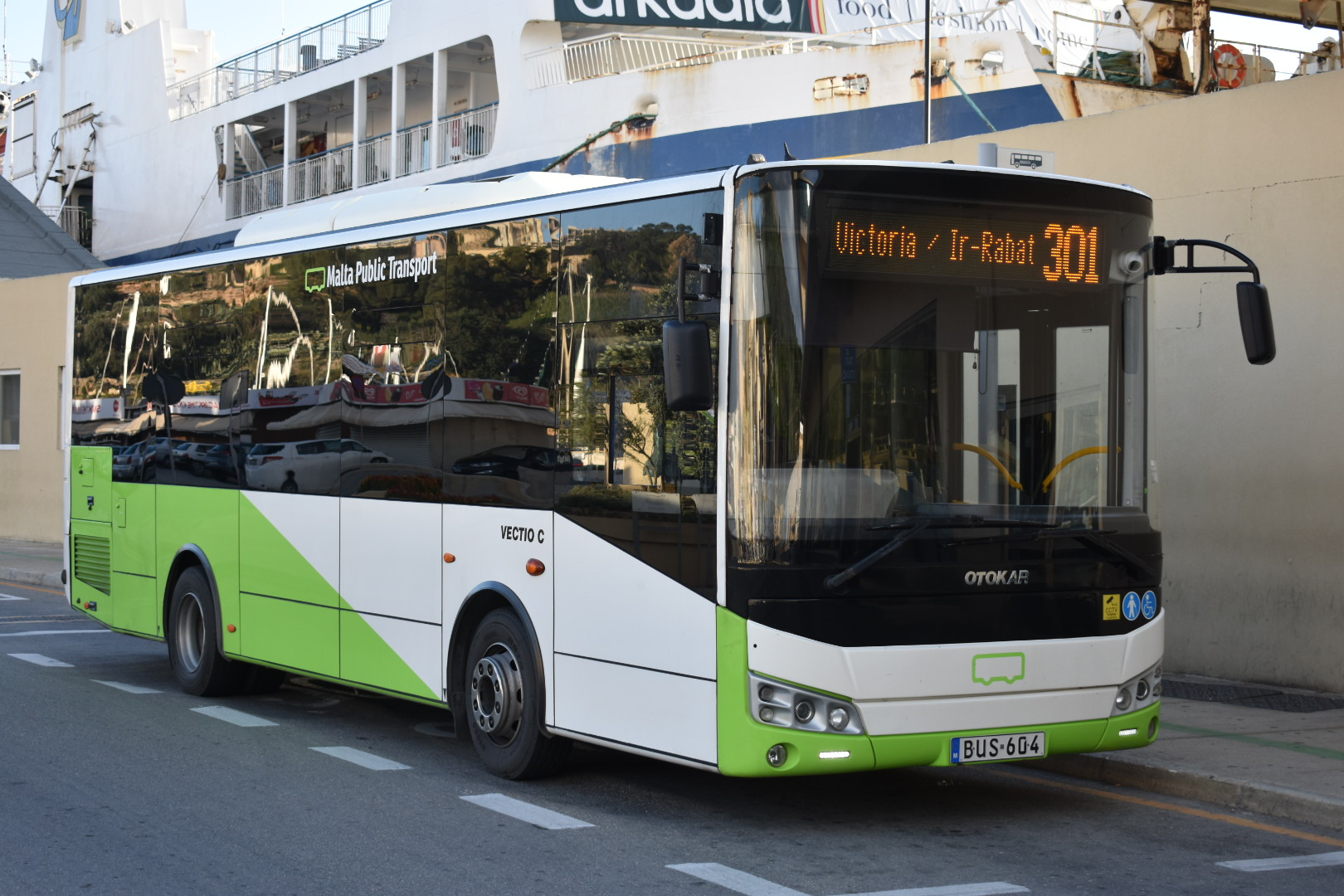
Transport bus in Gozo in 2017

Although Arriva ceased to operate in Gozo and Malta in January 2014, their old vehicles have been retired since 2016 and most routes remain the same, although there have been some amendments and additions. The most noticeable change at the moment is that the discrepancy between resident and non-resident fares has been abolished with all passengers now paying €2.50 for a 2-hour ticket, although other fares apply for the Tallinja Card holders. However, as from October 2022, riding a bus in both Malta and Gozo has become free for residents of Malta. The Explorer Card is valid for 7-days, costs 35€ and gives you unlimited travel by bus. The user can hop on and off anytime and has some benefits like cheaper Tallinja bikes.

=== Other ===
A 'Hop-on, Hop-off' tourist bus service operates in Gozo. The open top bus tour of Gozo starts from the harbour of Mġarr and there are stops located along the route. In Gozo, there are 2 providers, City Sightseeing Gozo and Gozo Sightseeing.

== Demographics ==
Historical population
Year	Pop.	±%
1921	22,561	—
1931	23,837	+5.7%
1948	27,680	+16.1%
1957	27,601	−0.3%
1967	25,978	−5.9%
1985	25,682	−1.1%
1995	29,026	+13.0%
2005	31,007	+6.8%
2011	31,375	+1.2%
2021	39,287	+25.2%
Source: NSO, p. 19

As of 2021, the island has a population of 39,287, of whom 7,242 live in its capital city Victoria. Since the 2011 census, the population increased by 25%.

== Geography ==
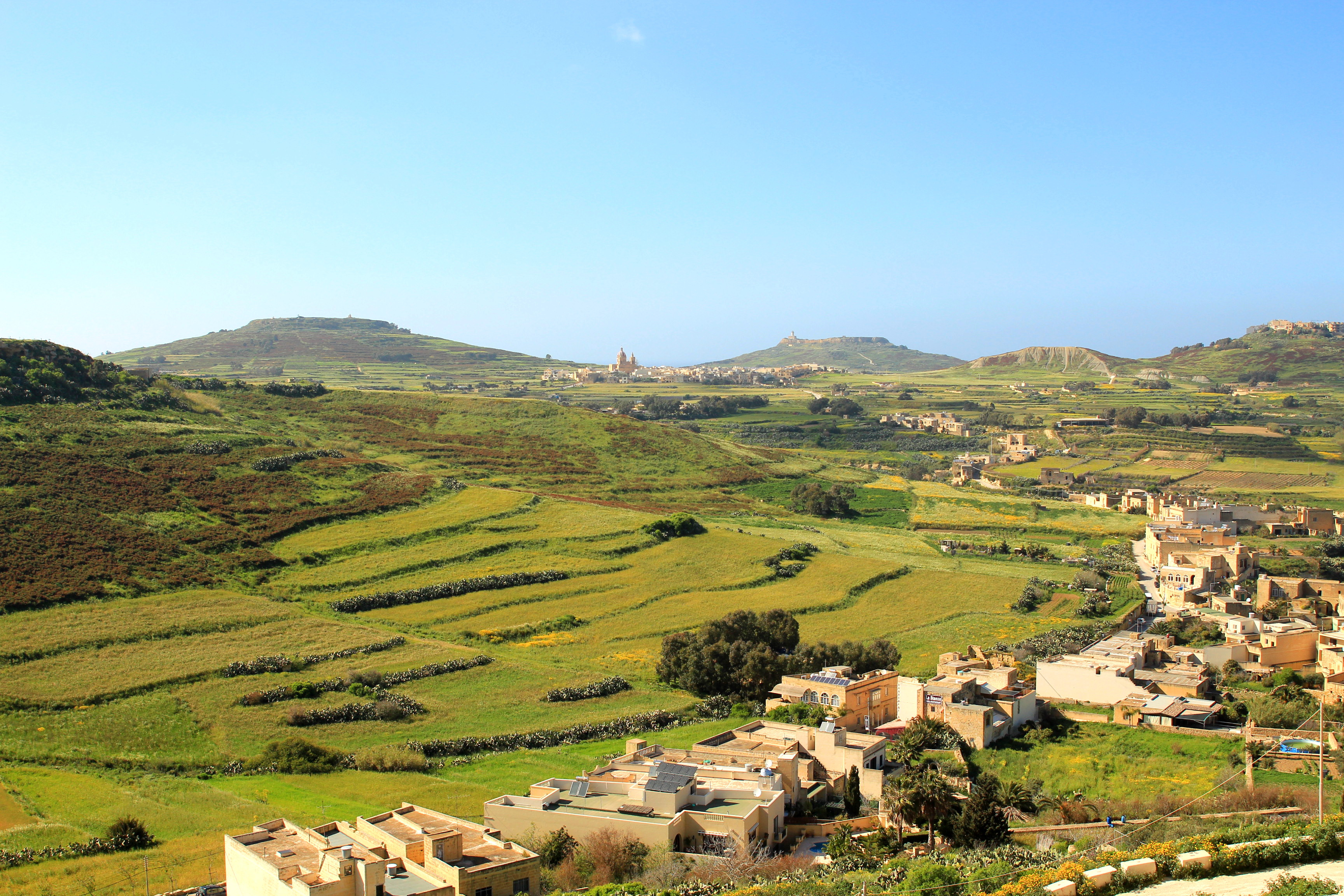
Gozitan landscape in Għasri, as viewed from the Cittadella.

Gozo is famed for its places of interest. Some of these include Calypso's Cave (from Homer's Odyssey, where the island is called Ogygia) and the Ġgantija Neolithic temples which are amongst the oldest surviving man-made structures.

Gozo covers 67 square kilometres (26 mi^{2}), approximately the same area as New York City's Manhattan island. It lies approximately 6 kilometres (4 mi) northwest of Malta, is of oval form, and is 14 kilometres (8.7 mi) long and 7.25 kilometres (4.50 mi) wide.

Notable beaches in Gozo include San Blas and the beach at Ramla Bay.

Gozo is known to be very hilly. Research shows that there are at least 31 hills and hillocks on the small island. The best known "three hills" are the Xagħra hill, the Nadur hill, and Żebbuġ. Other smaller hills and hillocks include Il-Gelmus, Ta' Ġordan, and ta' Dabrani.

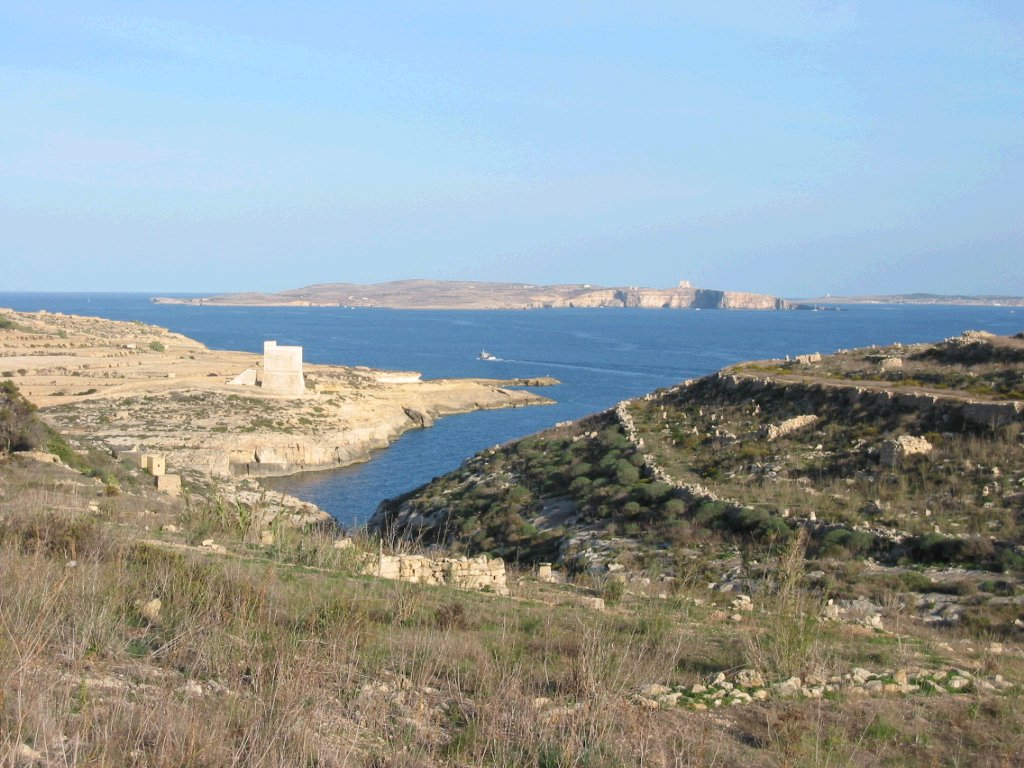
View of Mġarr ix-Xini, with Comino and mainland Malta in the background.

== Culture and traditions ==
Gozo is known for Nadur carnival. Feasts are important traditions on the island and are held in honour of the patron saint of each village. The celebrations include religious ceremonies, fireworks and live band music, some feature horse racing, concerts, and a greasy pole competition over the water.

The local feast allows time for Gozitans to meet. In Nadur, many locals dress up in colourful, outrageous carnival costumes, with the intention of not being recognised.

Some of Maltese dishes or variants of these dishes are associated with Gozo. Gozo is particularly known for its local cheeselet, ġbejna t'Għawdex.

Gozo has two opera houses. Astra and Aurora are owned by rival band clubs that both trace their founding to 1863. For over a century, they have been one-upping each other in everything from musical performances to feast-day celebrations. Once, when Aurora heard rumours that Astra planned to bring a horse onstage during a performance of Aida, the competing house—which was presenting its own Aida—secretly cast two horses. Some locals on the island compare the rivalry to an arms race.

== Wildlife ==
During the summer months on Gozo, the Maltese wall lizard is often seen. The lizard was originally thought to be a variety of the common wall lizard (Podarcis muralis) of mainland Europe. For example, the naturalist Andrew Leith Adams writing in 1870 reported "the common lizard (Podarcis muralis)" as occurring on the islands. In 1876, Dr. J. Bedriaga named this Maltese variety Lacerta filfolensis since the animals he studied came from the islet of Filfla. Later studies, however, showed that the lizards of the Maltese Islands were actually quite different from the common wall lizard or any other species in the region and therefore Bedriaga's L. filfolensis became established as a distinct species whose full modern name is Podarcis filfolensis – the Maltese wall lizard.

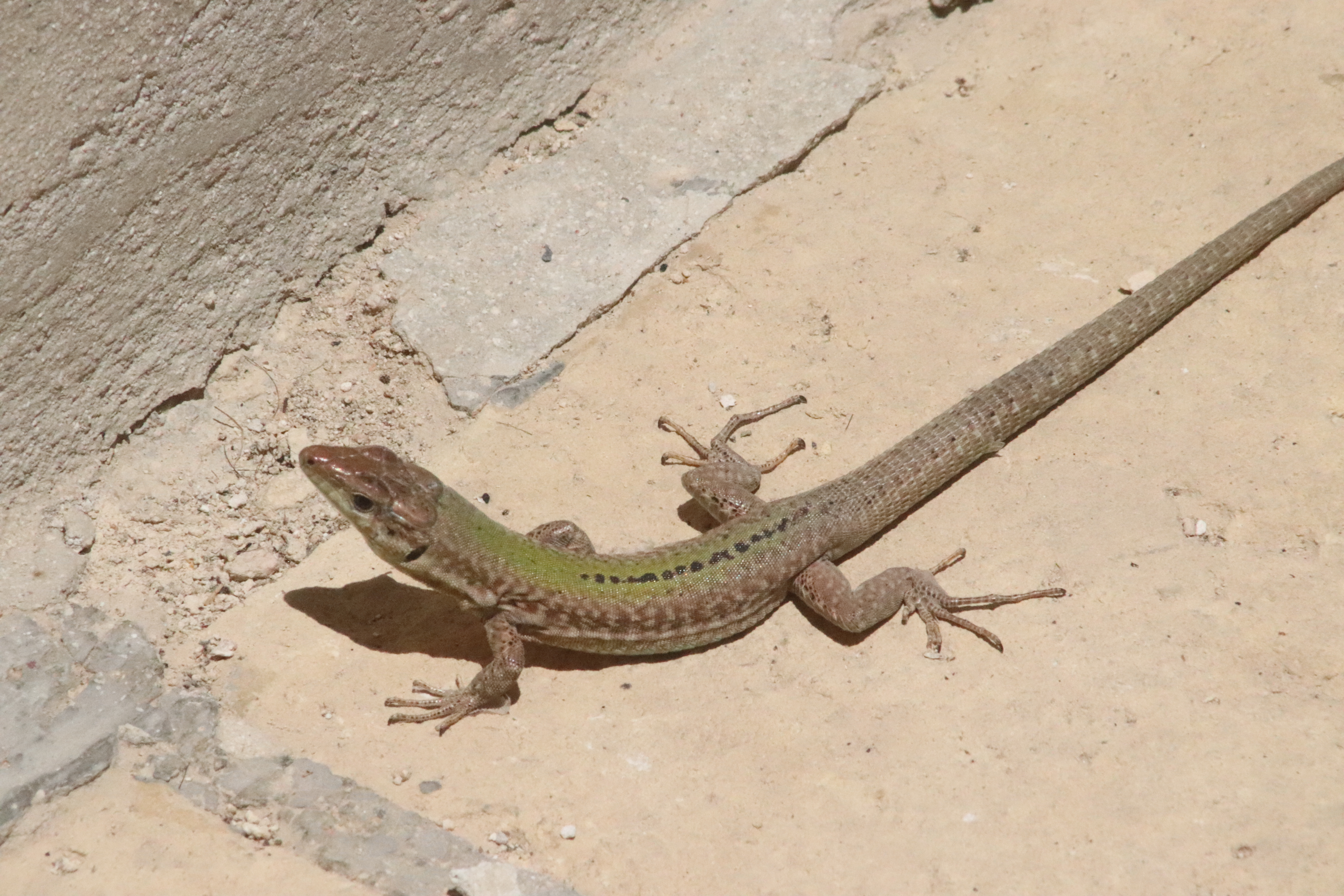
Maltese Wall Lizard (Gozo)

== Sport ==
The island of Gozo has its own national football team. Because Gozo is a part of Malta and not an independent state, this team is not official and is thereby on the N.F.-Board. Gozo F.C. used to represent Gozo in the Maltese League, whilst a Gozo Football League is also maintained. Football on the island is managed by the Gozo Football Association. There is also a rugby club in Gozo; the Gozo Rugby Club opened its doors in 2011 and nowadays competes in the Malta Rugby Football Union and Malta Rugby League competition.

== Education ==
The Malta campus of Queen Mary University of London is based in Gozo. It is designated an undergraduate medical school, with the same curriculum taught as the main UK campus. There is a branch of MCAST in Għajnsielem as well.

== Media ==
Gozo was used to depict "Resolution Island" in the 1953 film Single-Handed, based on C. S. Forester's book Brown on Resolution. For much of the film, the German raider Essen (depicted by HMS Manxman) is holed up in the semi-circular Dwejra Bay, behind Fungus Rock on the west coast of Gozo, and there are several scenes set amongst the desolate limestone cliffs above the bay as Able Seaman Brown single-handedly detains the German ship until her pursuers can catch up with her.

In 1969, Anthony Newley directed the beach scenes of Can Heironymus Merkin Ever Forget Mercy Humppe and Find True Happiness? starring Joan Collins at Ramla Bay.

In 1978, Kevin Connor's film Warlords of Atlantis starring Doug McClure was shot in Marsalforn Bay.

Two days of shooting in Gozo's strong Mediterranean light provided shots used to represent the desolate surface of the alien planet in the 1981 British horror film Inseminoid.

In 1981, parts of Episode 7 from Brideshead Revisited were filmed on the island, particularly in Kerċem, to depict Fez in Morocco.

Gozo was the location for Calypso's island in the 1997 Hallmark miniseries The Odyssey based on Homer's epic poem.

Dwejra was one of several filming locations in the Maltese islands used for the 2011 HBO TV series Game of Thrones.

The film By the Sea, starring Angelina Jolie and Brad Pitt was partially filmed at Mġarr ix-Xini from August to November 2014.

The British television series The Madame Blanc Mysteries has been filmed on the island since 2021.

== Local councils ==
The following is a list of local councils in Gozo:

Local council	Area	Population (2021)	Pop. density
Fontana	0.5 km^{2}	1,042	2,084 km^{2}
Għajnsielem	4.4 km^{2}	3,523	801 km^{2}
Għarb	4.6 km^{2}	1,549	337 km^{2}
Għasri	5.0 km^{2}	518	104 km^{2}
Kerċem	5.5 km^{2}	1,881	342 km^{2}
Munxar	2.8 km^{2}	1,707	610 km^{2}
Nadur	7.2 km^{2}	4,548	632 km^{2}
Qala	5.9 km^{2}	2,300	390 km^{2}
San Lawrenz	3.6 km^{2}	772	214 km^{2}
Sannat	3.8 km^{2}	2,186	575 km^{2}
Victoria (Rabat)	2.9 km^{2}	7,242	2,497 km^{2}
Xagħra	7.6 km^{2}	5,161	679 km^{2}
Xewkija	4.5 km^{2}	3,555	790 km^{2}
Żebbuġ, Gozo	7.6 km^{2}	3,303	435 km^{2}
Total	67.1 km^{2}	39,287	585 km^{2} (Average)

== Notable features ==
The following is a list of notable features in Gozo:

- Cittadella, including the Cathedral
- Fontana Springs
- Fungus Rock
- Inland Sea
- Ramla Bay
- Rotunda of Xewkija
- Santwarju tal-Madonna ta' Pinu
- St George's Basilica

== See also ==
- Gozo farmhouse
- Gozo Region
- Malta lunar sample displays
