= Azure Window =

Former natural arch in Gozo, Malta

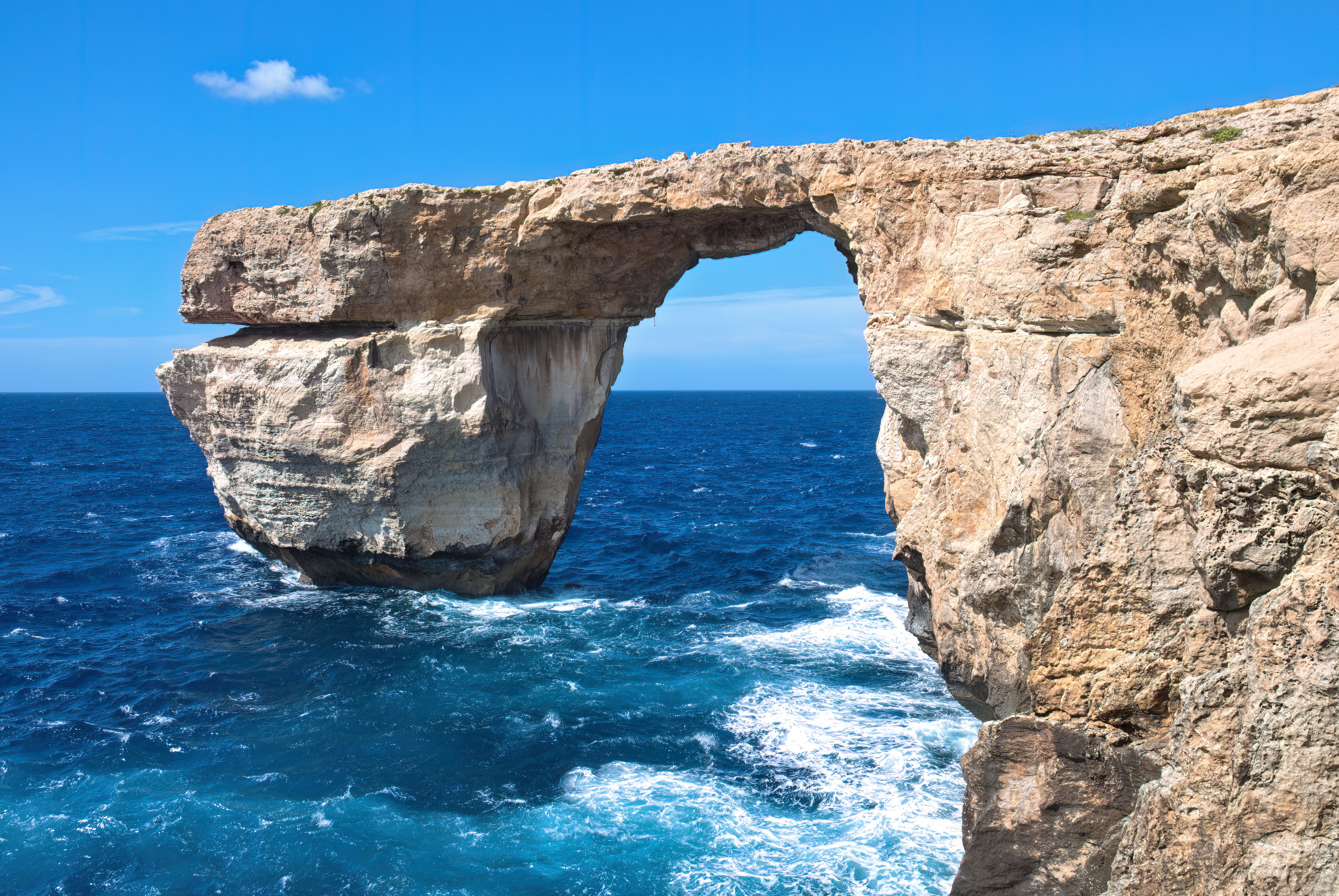
- View of the Azure Window in 2013
- Interactive map of Azure Window
- Location: Gozo, Malta
- Nearest city: San Lawrenz
- Coordinates: 36°03′12.8″N 14°11′18.1″E
- Elevation: 28 m (92 ft)
- Created: c. 1830
- Disestablished: 8 March 2017; 9 years ago
- Named for: Tieka Szerka
- Governing body: Environmental Resources Authority
- Owner: Government of Malta
- Website: www.azurewindowgozo.com

The Azure Window (Maltese: it-Tieqa Żerqa), also known as the Dwejra Window (Maltese: it-Tieqa tad-Dwejra), was a 28-metre-tall (92 ft) natural arch on the island of Gozo, located just off the shores of Malta. The limestone feature, which was in Dwejra Bay close to the Inland Sea and Fungus Rock, was one of the island's major tourist attractions until it collapsed in stormy weather on 8 March 2017. The arch, together with other natural features in the area, has appeared in a number of international films and media productions.

The rock formation, which consisted of a pillar rising from the sea joined to the cliff by a horizontal slab, was created by the collapse of a sea cave, probably during the 19th century. The final collapse in 2017 followed a century of natural erosion, during which large sections of the limestone arch had broken off and fallen into the sea.

== History ==
=== Formation ===
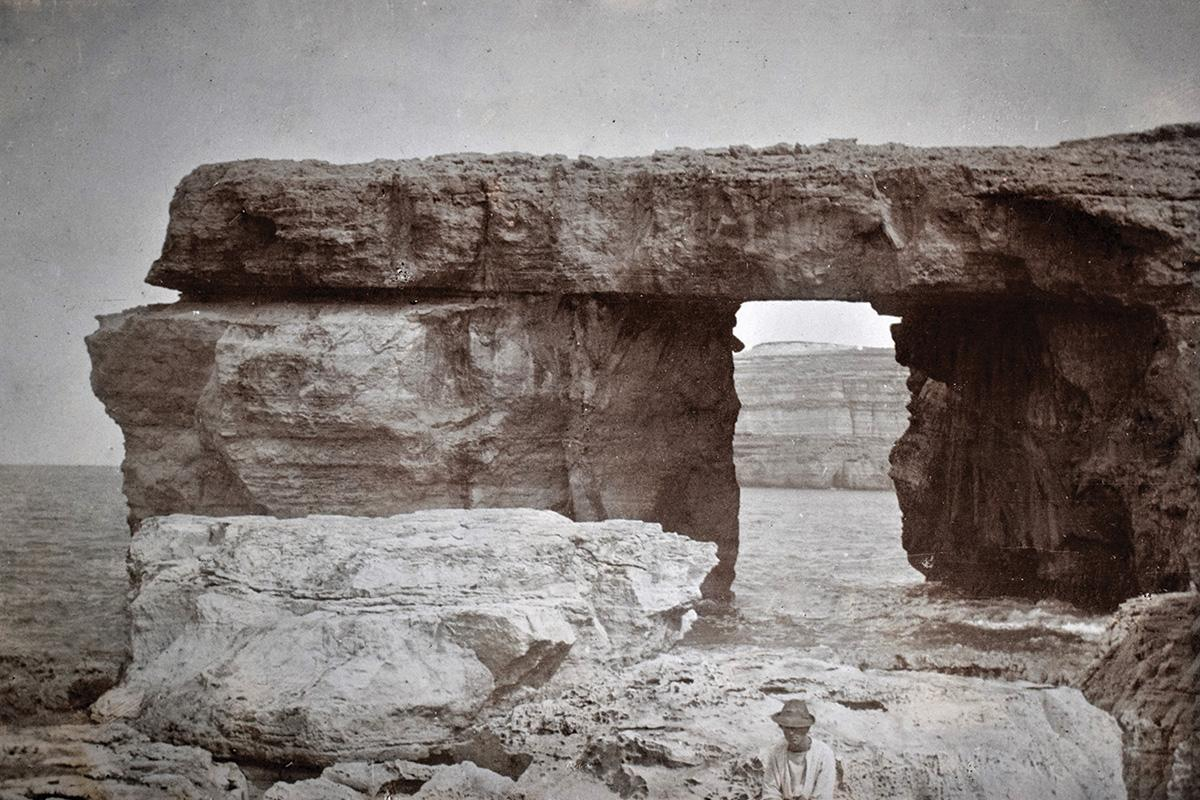
One of the first pictures of the Azure Window, by Richard Ellis, around 1890

The Azure Window developed through sea erosion of a limestone cliff face. The progress starts with an initial notch resulting from wave action. This space devoid of rock then causes tensile stresses that lead to the formation of a vertical joint extending upwards from the notch. This joint would progressively become wider, first forming a cave and eventually an arch. The end of the lifecycle of the arch is reached when erosion finally progresses so far that the roof of the arch gets heavier than the pillars can support. It is not known exactly when the arch came to being, but the entire process is believed to have taken around 500 years.

The arch is not mentioned in 17th- and 18th-century descriptions of the Dwejra area, which was already famous due to the nearby Fungus Rock, so it probably did not exist then. Giovanni Francesco Abela's 1647 book Della Descrizione di Malta and De Soldanis' 1746 manuscript Il Gozo Antico-Moderno e Sacro-Profano both mention a Tieqa Żerqa (written archaically as Tieka Szerka) or Għar iż-Żerqa, but this referred to the cave entrance to the nearby Inland Sea. Therefore, it is likely that when the Azure Window formed it inherited its name from this other cave.

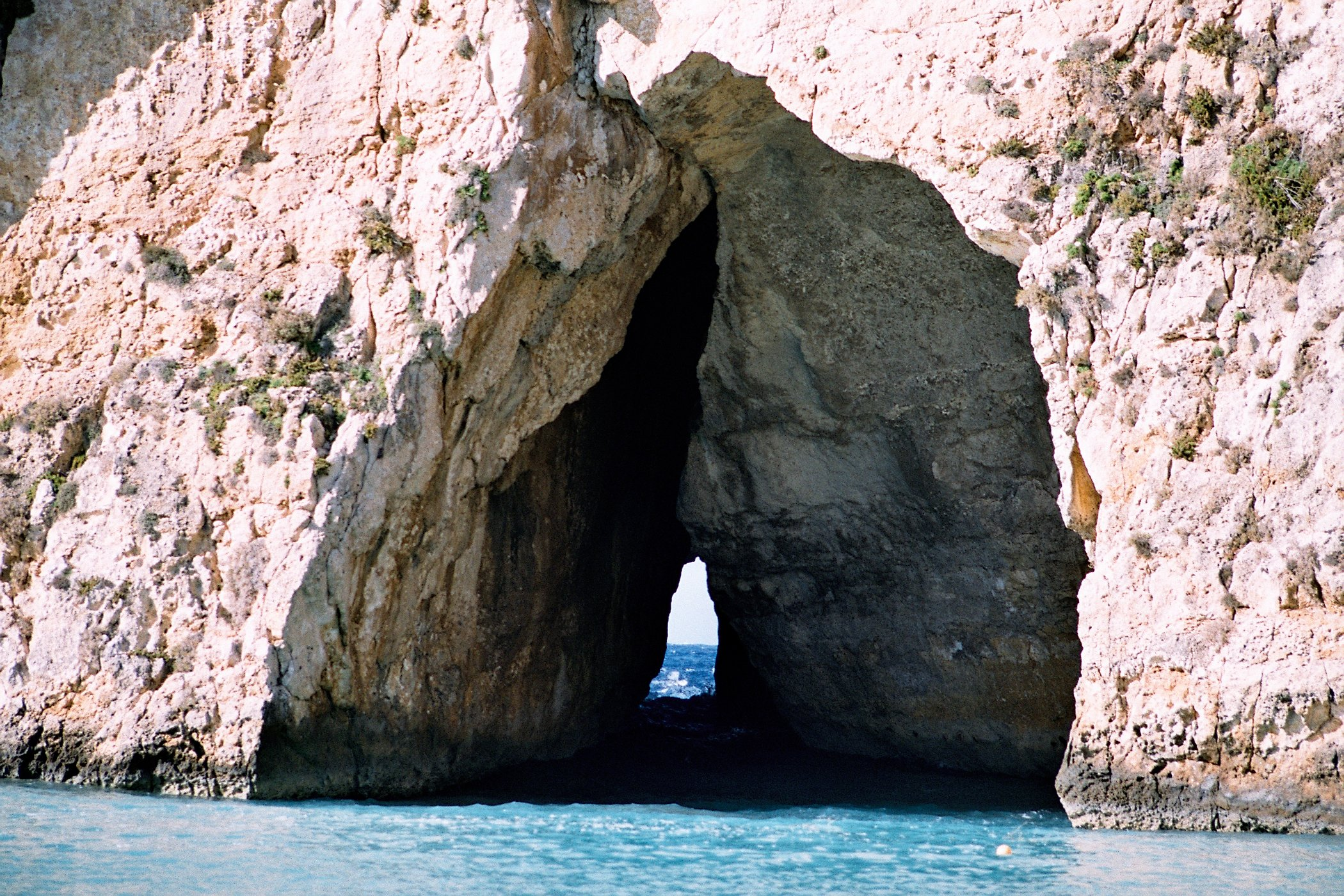
The entrance to the Inland Sea, called the Azure Window in 17th- and 18th-century sources. The natural arch may have inherited its name from this cave

The earliest known record of the Azure Window is in an 1824 illustration of the nearby Dwejra Tower. However, it is shown in the background of the image, and it is unclear whether it was still a cave or if it had already developed into an arch. A pencil drawing by Lt Col. Richard Irton of a fully formed Azure Window probably dates to 1830. In 1866, artist Edward Lear visited Dwejra and stated in his journal that "the coast scenery is not nearly as fine as that of Malta." The earliest recorded photographs of the natural arch were taken by Richard Ellis, and they are found in an album belonging to Michael Dundon dated 26 July 1879. The photo by Ellis was published in a book in 2011, showing contrasting difference with 20th and 21st century photos.

Throughout the 20th and early 21st centuries, the arch was one of Malta's main tourist landmarks, and it was a popular backdrop in photographs. It was included in a Special Area of Conservation, and in 1998, included on Malta's tentative list of UNESCO World Heritage Sites, along with the rest of Dwejra Bay.

=== Deterioration and partial collapses ===
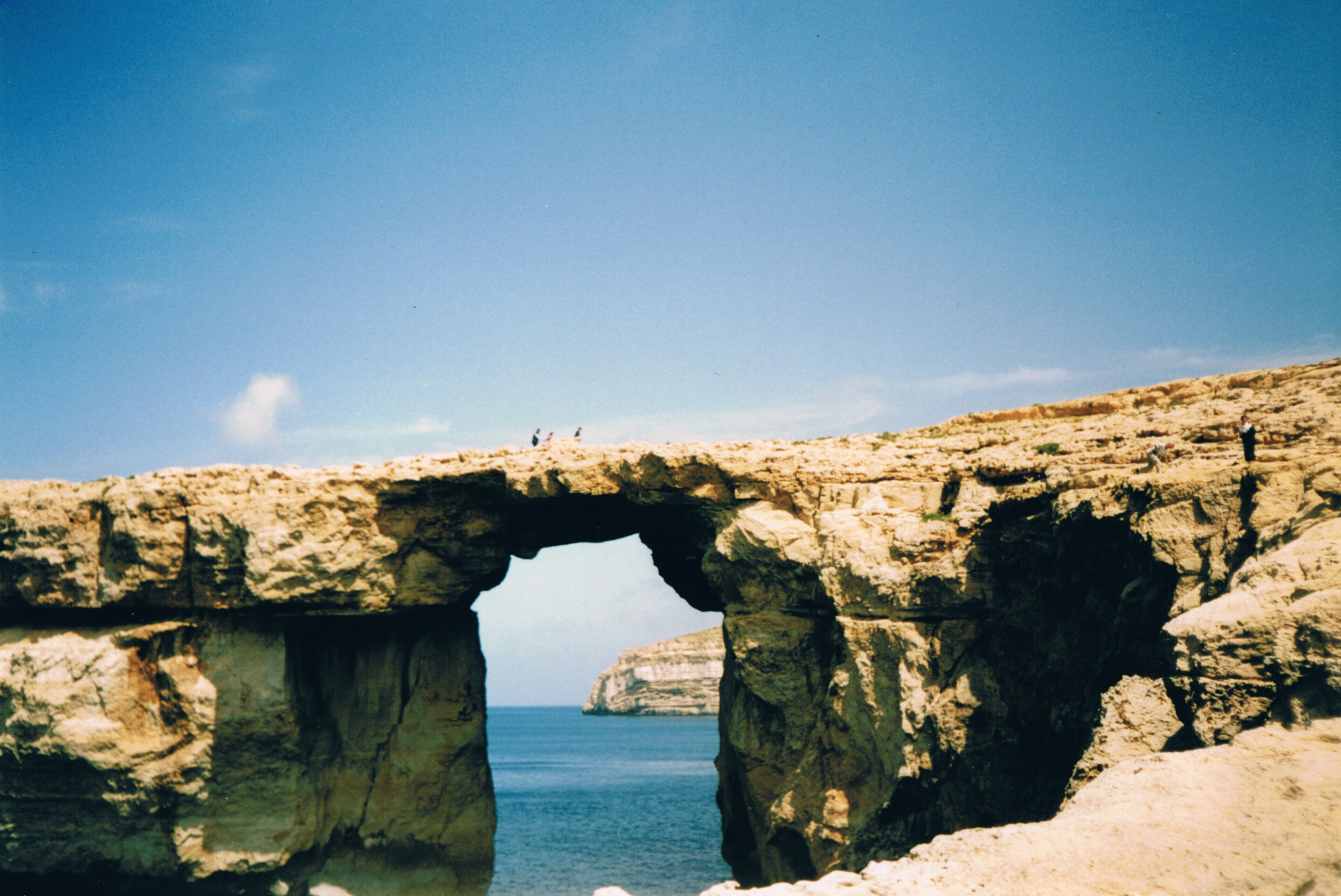
Visitors on top of the arch in 2003

Between the 1980s and the 2000s, parts of the top slab of the arch collapsed, significantly widening the arch. A large slab of rock on the outer edge of the cavity collapsed in April 2012, further increasing the size of the window. Another rock fall occurred in March 2013. Four months later a geological and geotechnical report was prepared by consultant Peter Gatt, who represented local firm Geoscience Consulting Ltd, and it determined that the arch was "relatively stable and will continue to remain so for a number of years", and that there was no "imminent" risk of collapse, although it warned that rock falls will continue and it might be hazardous for people to go close to the arch.

Further rock falls and fissures were reported in subsequent years. Fishermen avoided going near the arch with their boats, and warning signs were put up to discourage people from walking on top. However, many people still went on the arch regularly, and videos were uploaded on YouTube of people cliff diving from the window as rocks were falling down.

In March 2016, Gatt warned that the illegal use of explosives at the nearby Inland Sea could have an effect on the already weak structure of the nearby Azure Window. These comments were made in the wake of an investigation by the Malta Environment and Planning Authority which revealed that explosive material was "probably used" to do rock cutting in the tunnel leading to the Inland Sea. It was suspected that the illegal cutting was aimed at widening the entrance to allow larger boats to sail through.

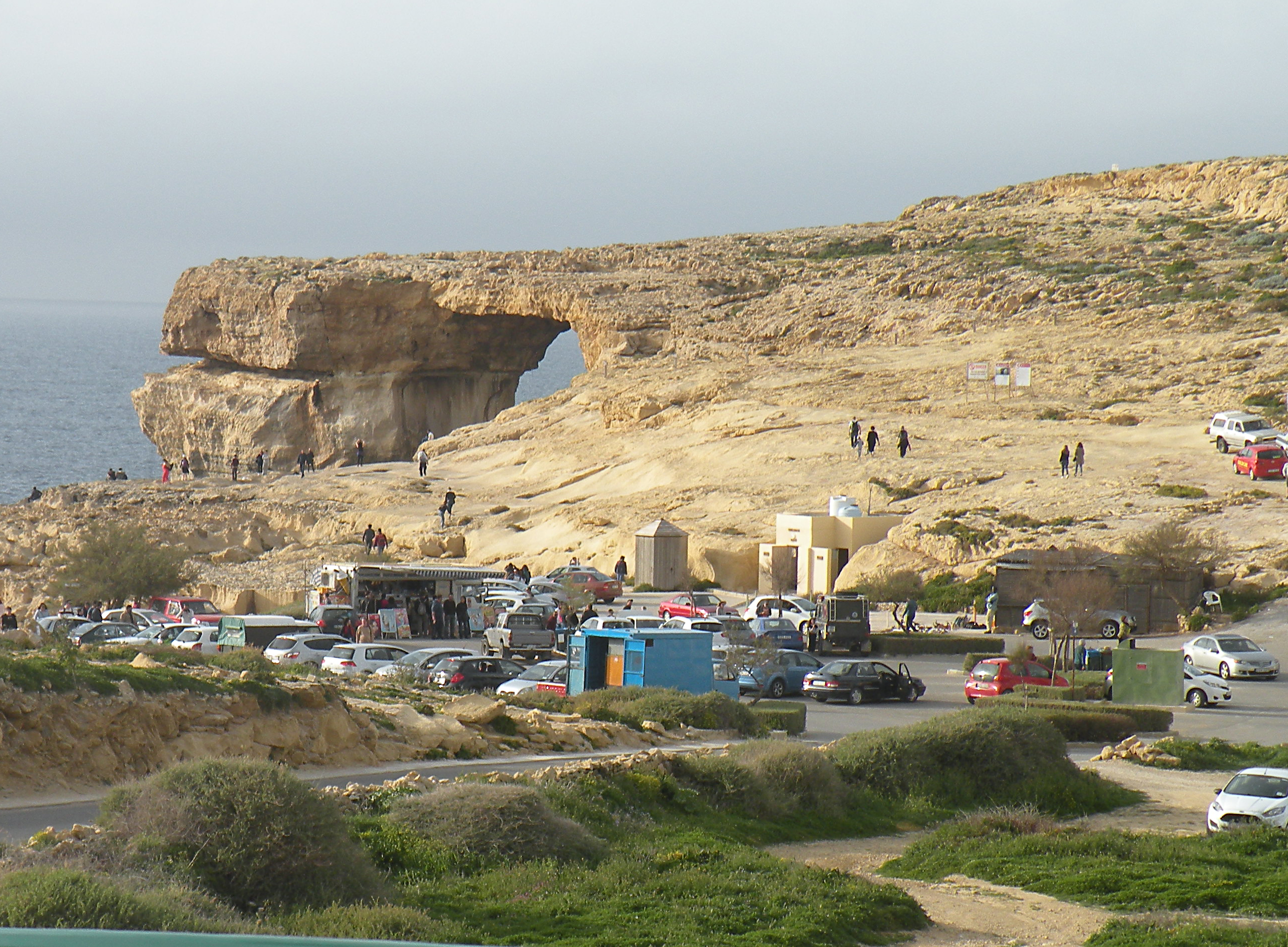
Visitors near the arch on 6 March 2017, two days before its collapse

In December 2016, an emergency order was published prohibiting people from going on the arch, trespassers facing a fine of €1500. However, this law was not enforced, and visitors were still walking on top of the arch days before it collapsed in March 2017.

=== Final collapse ===
The arch collapsed at about 9:40 am local time (8:40 am UTC) on 8 March 2017 after a period of heavy storms, leaving nothing visible above the water. The pillar gave way first, causing the top part of the arch to collapse along with it. The pillar likely shattered into large chunks of rock as it collapsed. The collapse was said to have been inevitable.

The collapse was reported in both local and international media. Prime Minister Joseph Muscat and Leader of the Opposition Simon Busuttil both tweeted about the collapse of the Azure Window, and it also became the subject of many Internet memes on Maltese social media. The Environment and Resources Authority called the collapse a major loss to Malta's natural heritage. The Church's Environment Commission said that the collapse should make the Maltese people reflect on their national heritage. The San Lawrenz local council urged the government to establish a management plan for the entire Dwejra area, which includes several other notable features despite the loss of the Azure Window.

On the day of the collapse, police appealed to the public not to visit the area. Diving in the area was temporarily banned, although this was not enforced and footage of the remains of the arch underwater emerged a few days after the collapse. The remains of the arch have formed a number of features which have been called a "divers' paradise", although Transport Malta and the Environment and Resources Authority still advised the public to keep away from the area until surveys and inspections were carried out.

Following the collapse, Gatt said that following his report, he had requested the arch and pillar to be monitored over a long period of time, in a bid to study the area and establish whether the pillar supporting the arch was moving, "but there wasn't any follow-up and the condition of the pillar remained unknown."

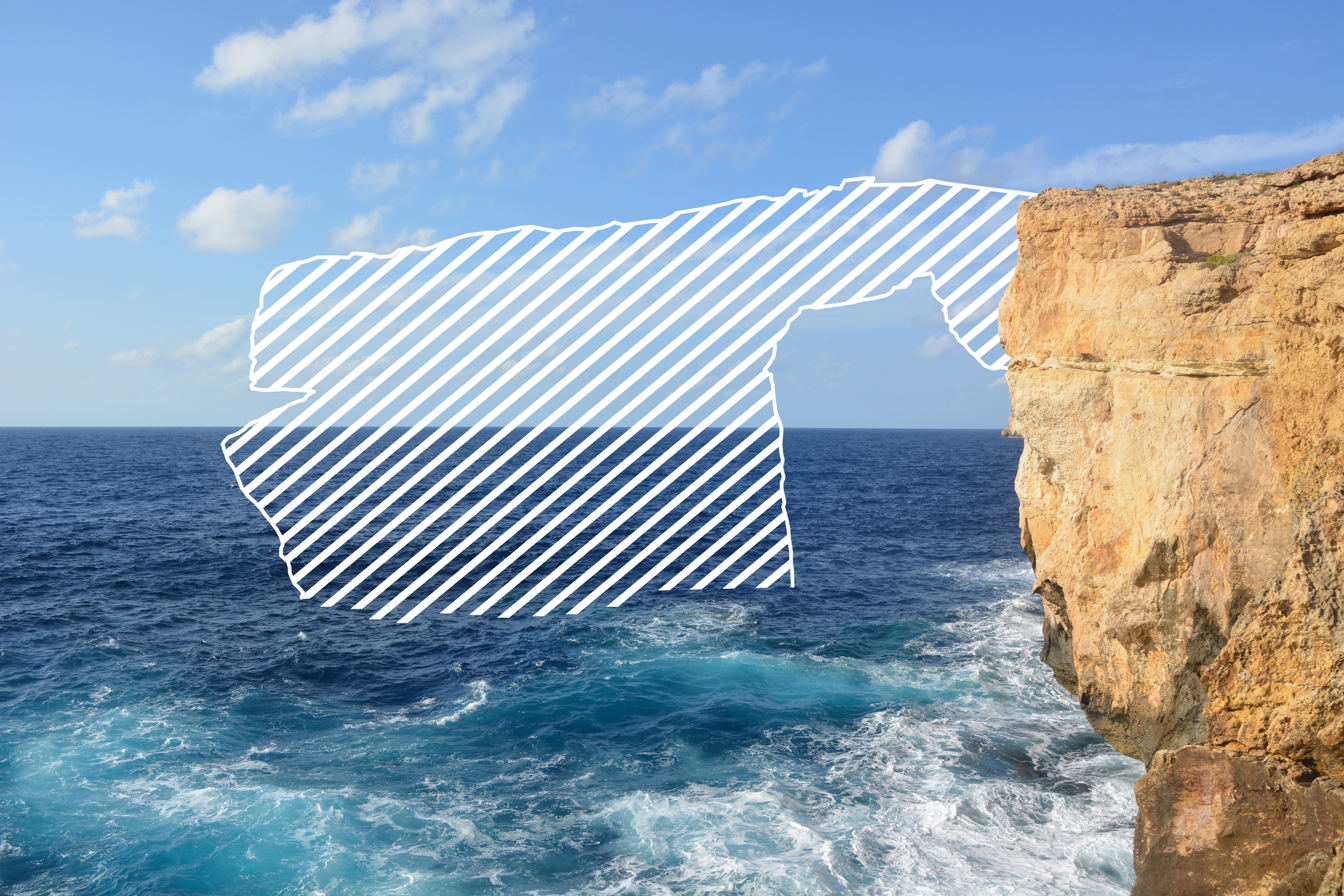
Post-collapse 2017 image indicating where the Azure Window had been

=== Aftermath ===
On 9 March 2017, the government announced that it would launch an international initiative on the future of Dwejra. The options being considered include leaving the site as is, retrieving the remains of the window from the seabed and exhibiting them, creating an artificial or an augmented reality reconstruction of the window, establishing an interpretation centre or creating an art installation at the site. The government stated that the rock formation will not be rebuilt. The only response to this international call was by Gozitan developer Joseph Portelli, proposing to construct a hotel within a quarry close to the site of the Azure Window. The project would also include an interpretation area, a diving centre, an interactive museum, a sky observation centre and transport facilities. In August 2018 it was announced that the government does not plan to proceed with this proposal.

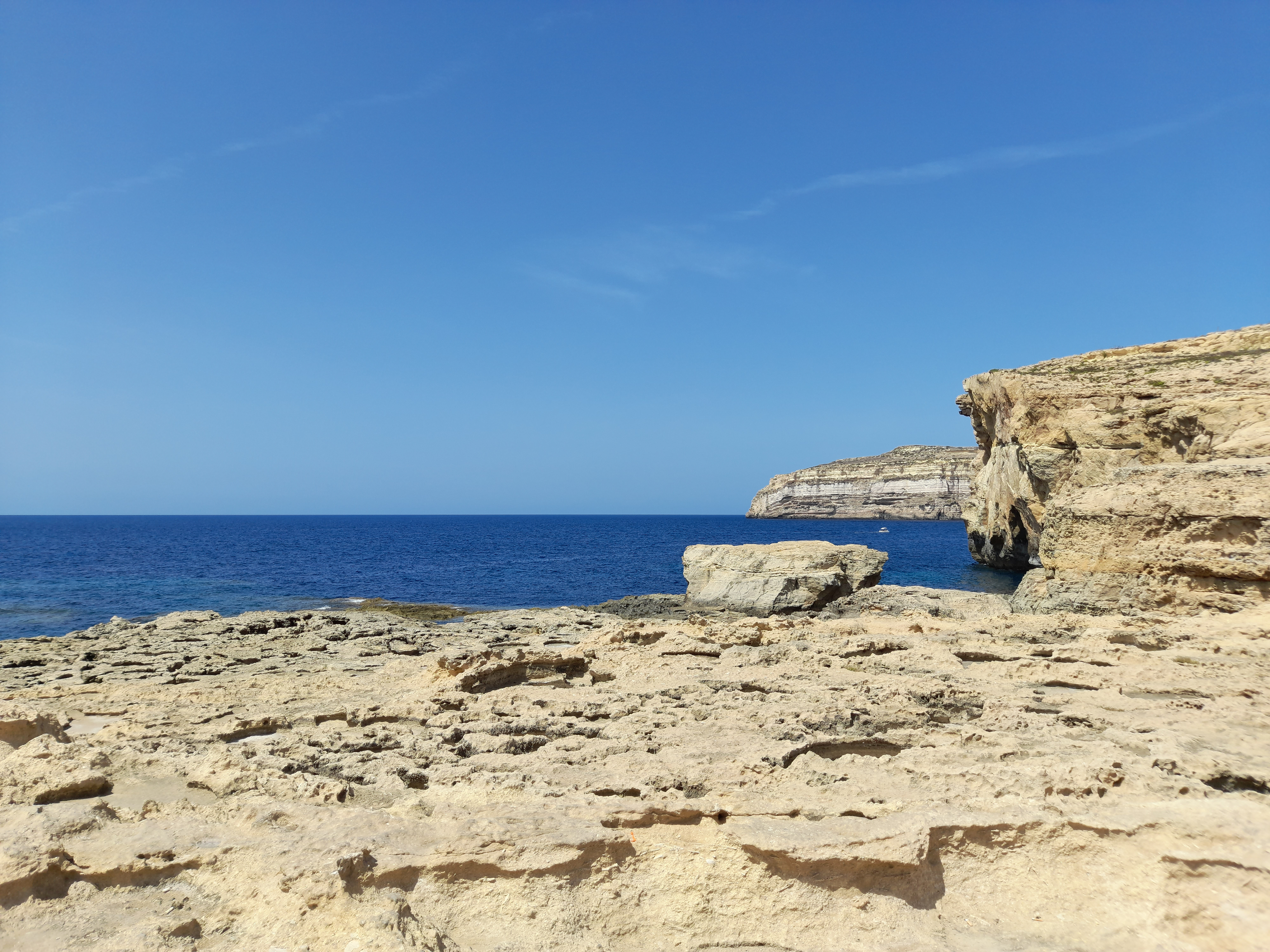
Post-collapse image of the former site of the Azure Window in 2022

In late 2018, the Russian architect Svetozar Andreev of Hoteì Russia, in collaboration with Elena Britanishskaya, announced a proposal to construct a steel structure on the site of the Azure Window. Entitled The Heart of Malta, the project consists of a structure with polygonal mirrored steel faces, having its size and proportions based on that of the former natural arch. The structure is to include five floors containing over 5,000 m^{2} (54,000 sq ft) of exhibition space, with each floor representing a period of Maltese history. A central spiral will connect the floors together. This proposal drew mixed reactions from the public. Most respondents to online polls were in favour. However, the project has also been criticized since the area is a marine park and the intervention would destroy the underwater remains of the original Azure Window. Moreover, the foundations would have to rest in the sea at a depth of over 50 m (160 ft), and the site is prone to heavy storms.

In August 2019, a new street in the nearby village of San Lawrenz was named Triq it-Tieqa tad-Dwejra (Dwejra Window Street) in memory of the natural landmark.

== Geology ==
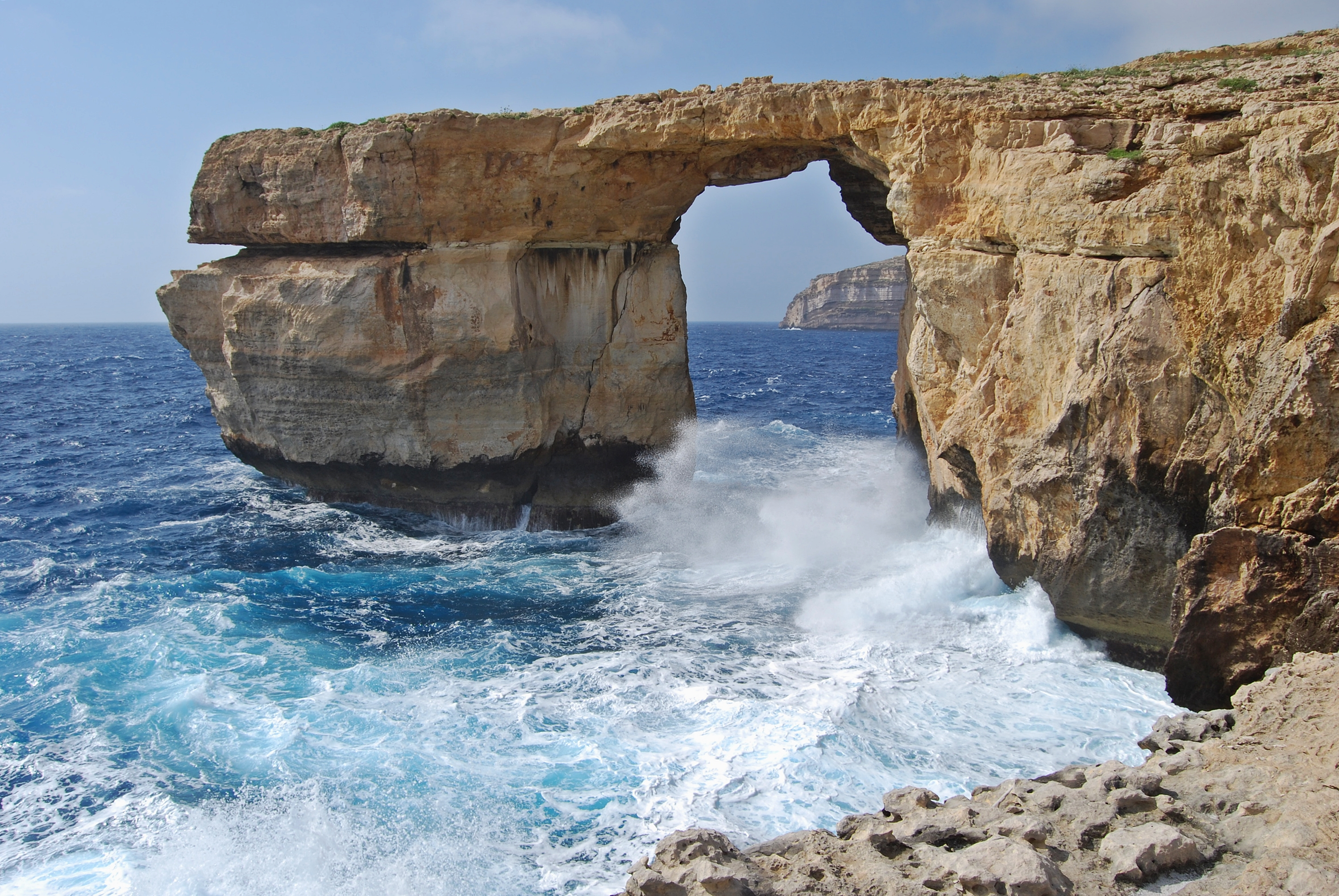
The arch in 2009, during a high tide

The Azure Window was a natural arch with a height of about 28 m (92 ft) and a span of around 25 m (82 ft). It was at the tip of a headland known as Dwejra Point. The arch was within the Lower Coralline Limestone Formation, a succession of sedimentary rocks that is widespread on the Maltese Islands and was deposited during the Oligocene. The Formation is subdivided into two Members, Member A and Member B. Member A formed the arch's base and pillars, and Member B formed much of the unsupported top of the arch.

Member A, ca. 20 m in thickness, mainly consists of the fossils of coralline red algae within a calcite cement. At the arch, it included four facies, numbered A-1 to A-4, with A-2 being the thickest. Deposition of these sediments was slow and occurred in water depths >30 m (98 ft) with moderate currents.

Member B was ca. 10 m (33 ft) in thickness and included five facies, numbered B-1 to B-5. B-1 forms a thin layer of white limestone between Member A and the rest of Member B which is rather soft and therefore more easily eroded, it therefore formed a depression around the window. It was deposited in shallow water with high wave action. B-2 and B-3 formed a 7 m (23 ft)-thick bed of horizontal and cross-bedded packstone to grainstone, which are porous and therefore less compact. B-5 was a 4 m (13 ft)-thick layer of packstone to wackestone limestone, and formed the upper unsupported part of the arch. The facies of Member B contained a number of fossils, including Scutella, Pecten, large echinoid spines and large benthic foraminifera. All of the beds of Member B were penetrated by two joints. A hybrid layer overlaid by Globigerina Limestone was found on top of facies B-5, but this was heavily eroded.

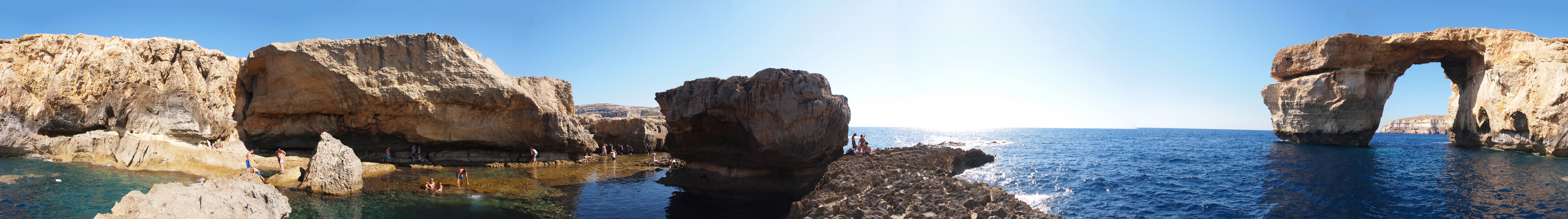
Panorama of the Azure Window with its natural surroundings in 2012

The arch was near the Inland Sea, a large circular sinkhole reached by a small arch that developed along a joint in the rocks. Fungus Rock, an islet that was formed when the bridge of a natural arch collapsed leaving a stack, is also nearby. The area also contains the Dwejra Tower, a 17th-century coastal watchtower built by the Order of St. John. Another natural arch, the Wied il-Mielaħ Window, is about 3.7 km (2.3 mi) northeast of Dwejra. It is, however, less known than the Azure Window.

== Media appearances ==
The Azure Window features in a number of films, including Clash of the Titans (1981), The Count of Monte Cristo (2002) and the 2010 Tamil language Indian film Vinnaithaandi Varuvaaya. It can also be seen in the television miniseries The Odyssey (1997). It was used as a filming location for the Dothraki wedding scene in the first season of HBO's TV series Game of Thrones. The filming of Game of Thrones resulted in controversy when a protected ecosystem was damaged by a subcontractor. Cliff diver David Colturi is featured in a 2017 Hugo Boss advert video at the Azure Window and the Wied il-Mielaħ Window.

== See also ==
- Wied il-Mielaħ Window, an intact natural arch on Gozo
- Darwin's Arch
- El Dedo de Dios
- London Bridge (Victoria), a collapsed rock arch in Australia
