= Fungus Rock =

Small islet in Gozo, Malta

Native name: Il-Ġebla tal-Ġeneral
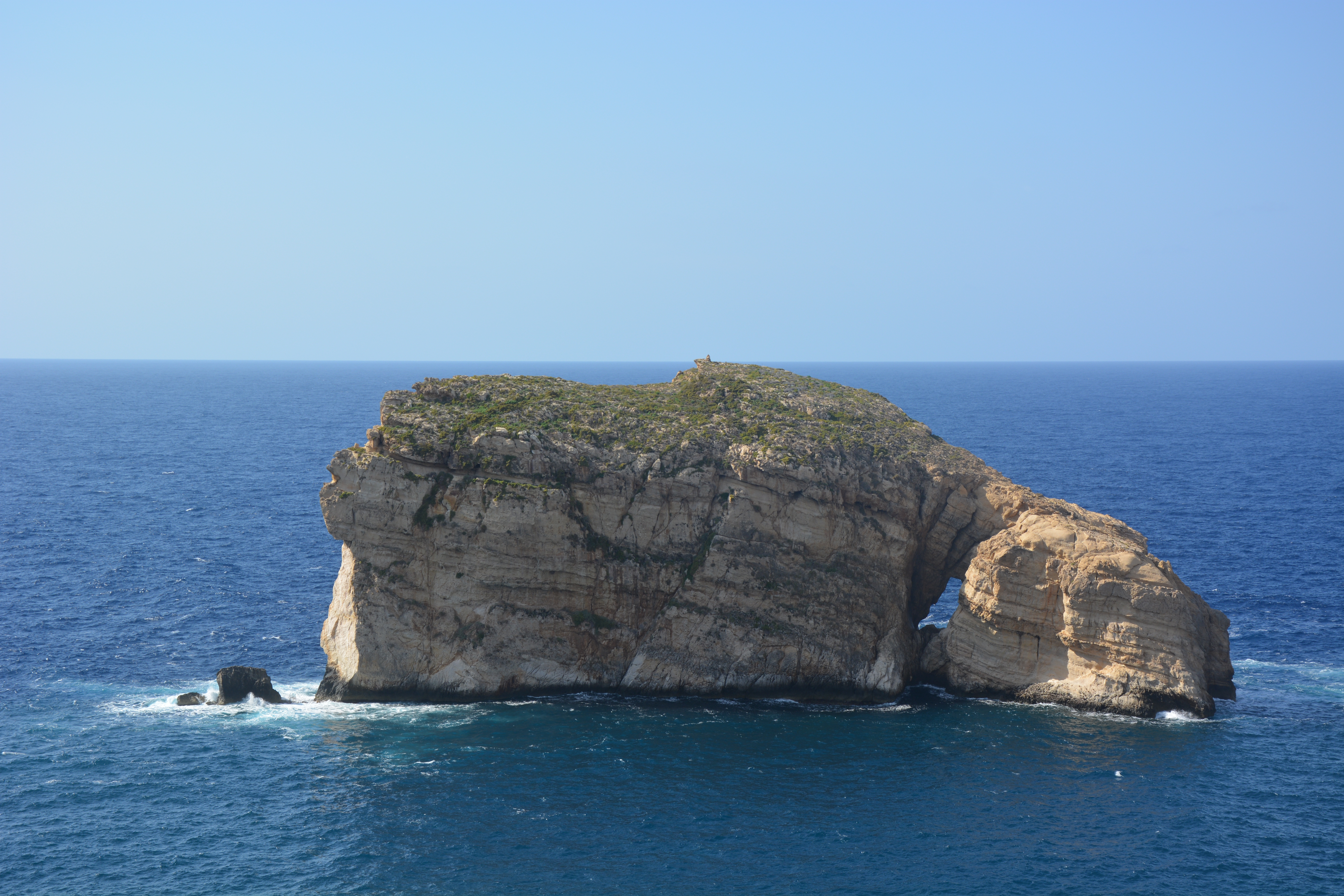

- Location within Malta Location within Mediterranean

Geography
- Location: off Malta, Mediterranean Sea
- Coordinates: 36°02′45″N 14°11′27″E
- Archipelago: Maltese islands
- Area: 0.007 km^{2} (0.0027 sq mi)
- Coastline: 494 m (1621 ft)
- Highest elevation: 60 m (200 ft)

Administration
- Malta

Demographics
- Population: 0

Fungus Rock, sometimes known as Mushroom Rock, and among the Maltese as Il-Ġebla tal-Ġeneral (English: The General's Rock), is a small islet in the form of a 60-metre-high (200 ft) massive lump of limestone at the entrance to an almost circular black lagoon in Dwejra, on the coast of Gozo, itself an island in the Maltese archipelago. It is located at 36°02′45″N 14°11′27″E and falls within the jurisdiction of the town of San Lawrenz.

The Dwejra nature reserve is administratively part of the town. The Fungus Rock is a prominent landmark of the reserve, as was formerly the Azure Window, before its collapse on March 8, 2017.

== History ==
The Knights Hospitaller apparently discovered what is popularly known as the Maltese fungus growing on the rock's flat top. This plant, which is a kind of parasitic flowering plant, not a fungus, has a repulsive smell. Doctors at the time believed that it had medicinal properties. The Knights used it as a styptic dressing for wounds and a cure for dysentery. They so prized it that they often gave gifts of it to distinguished noblemen and visitors to the Maltese islands.

Grand Master Pinto decreed the Rock out of bounds in 1746; trespassers risked a three-year spell as oarsmen in the Knights' galleys. He posted a permanent guard there and even built a precarious cable-car basket from the rock to the mainland, 50 metres (160 ft) away. He also ordered the sides smoothed to remove handholds.

Pinto's efforts were perhaps unnecessary. Pharmacologists are studying the medical effects of Fucus coccineus melitensis today.

Presently, Fungus Rock is a nature reserve. However, the shoreline nearby is accessible to bathers and the sea provides perfect snorkeling. Divers may experience big rocks, tiny caverns and swim-throughs along with varied species that swim around the vicinity of the rock.

The sunset can be photographed through the opening in Fungus Rock, but only from the inlet anchorage, and only during seasons when the sun descends the right way.

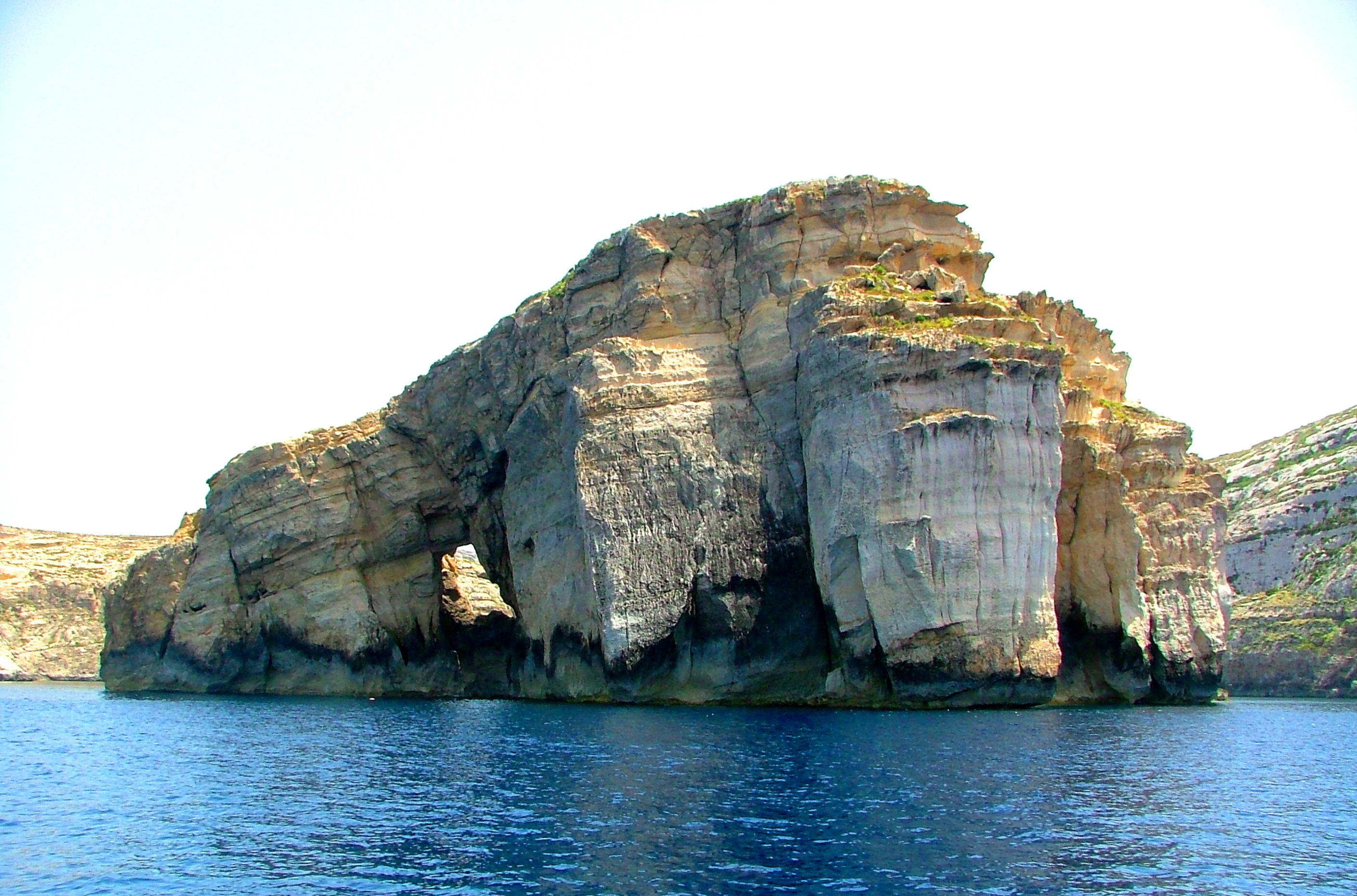
Fungus Rock's rear view

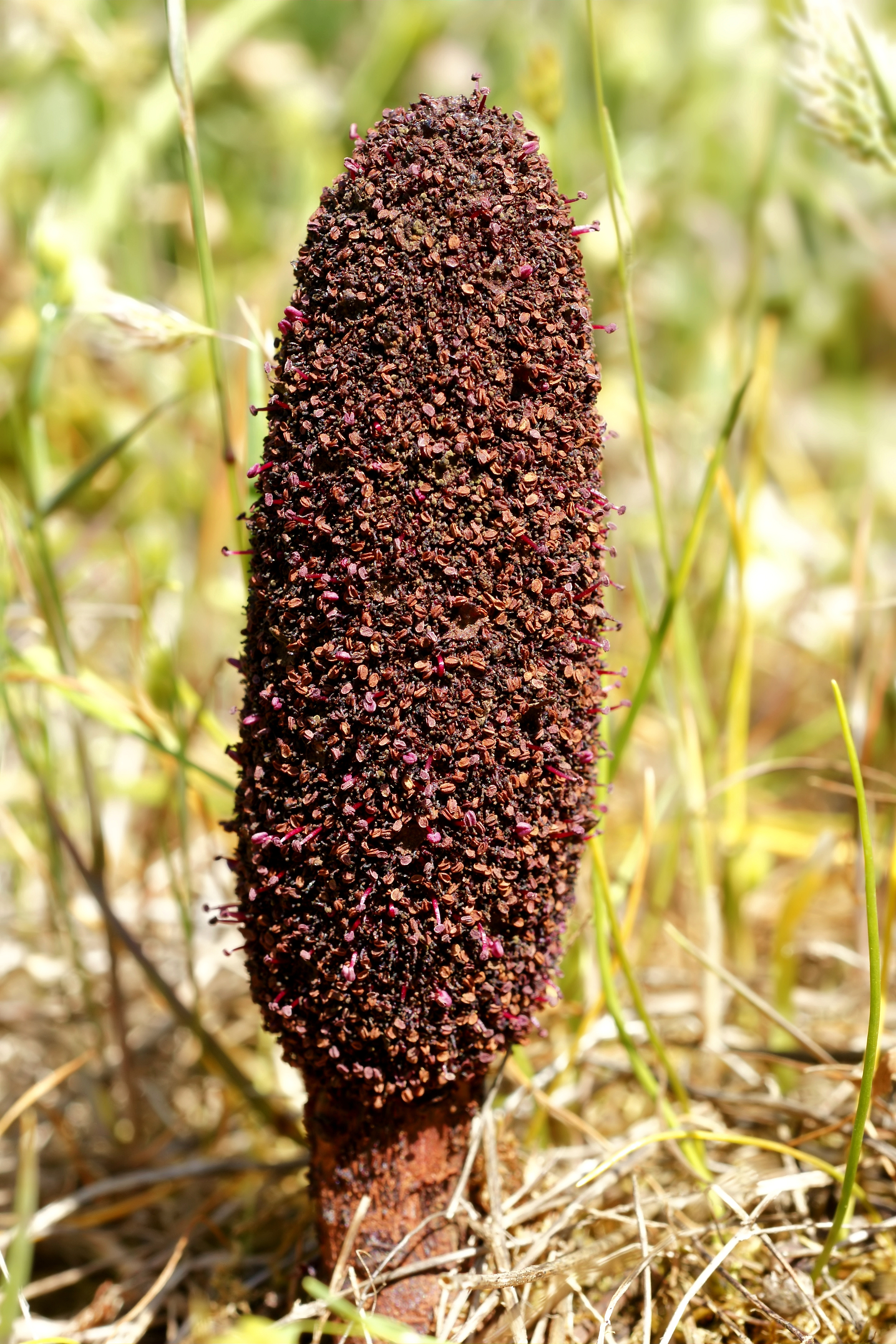
Cynomorium coccineum, the strange plant that gave Fungus Rock its name

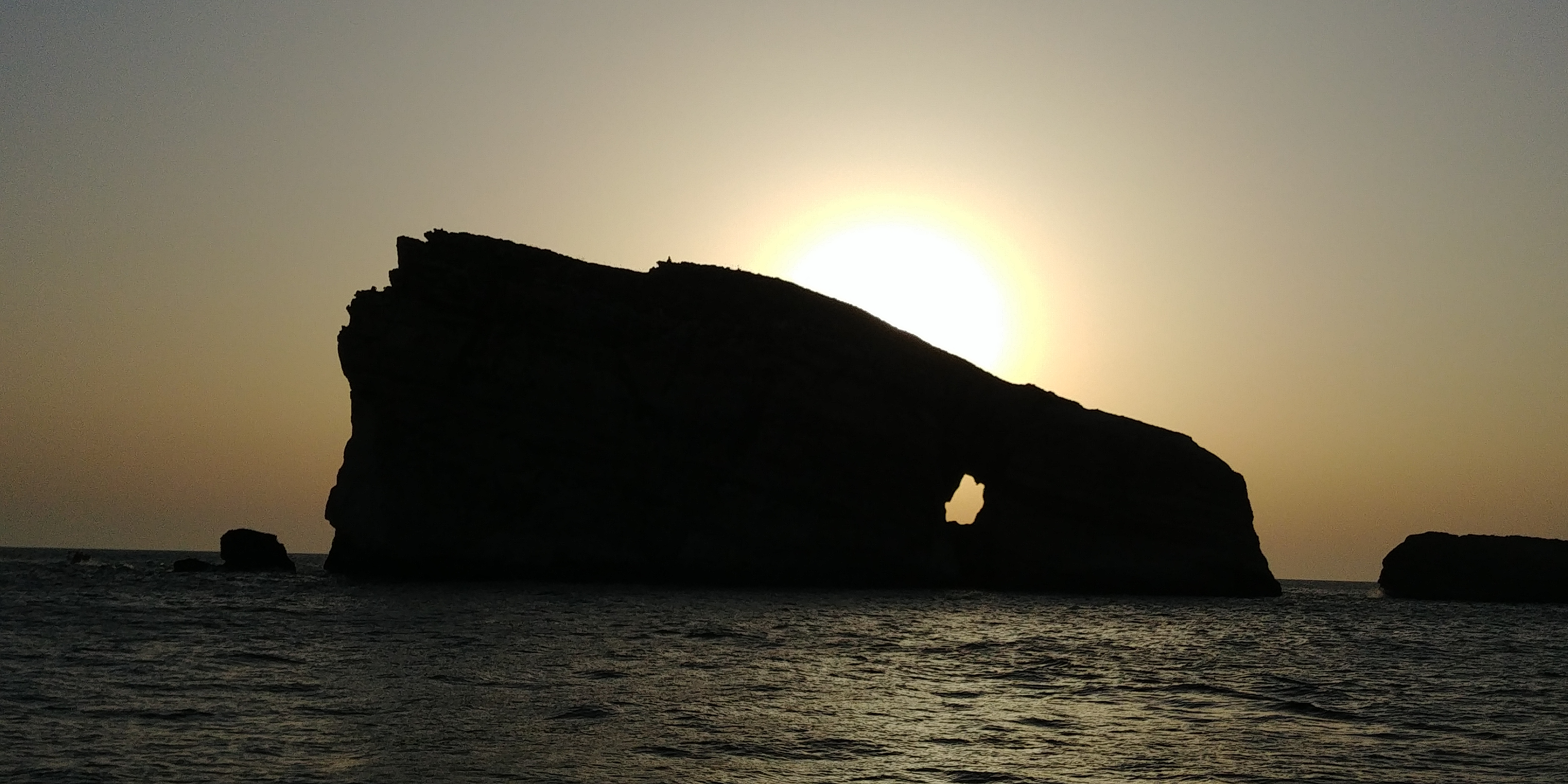
Sunset through Fungus Rock
