= Wied il-Mielaħ Window =

Natural arch on Gozo, Malta

Wied il-Mielaħ
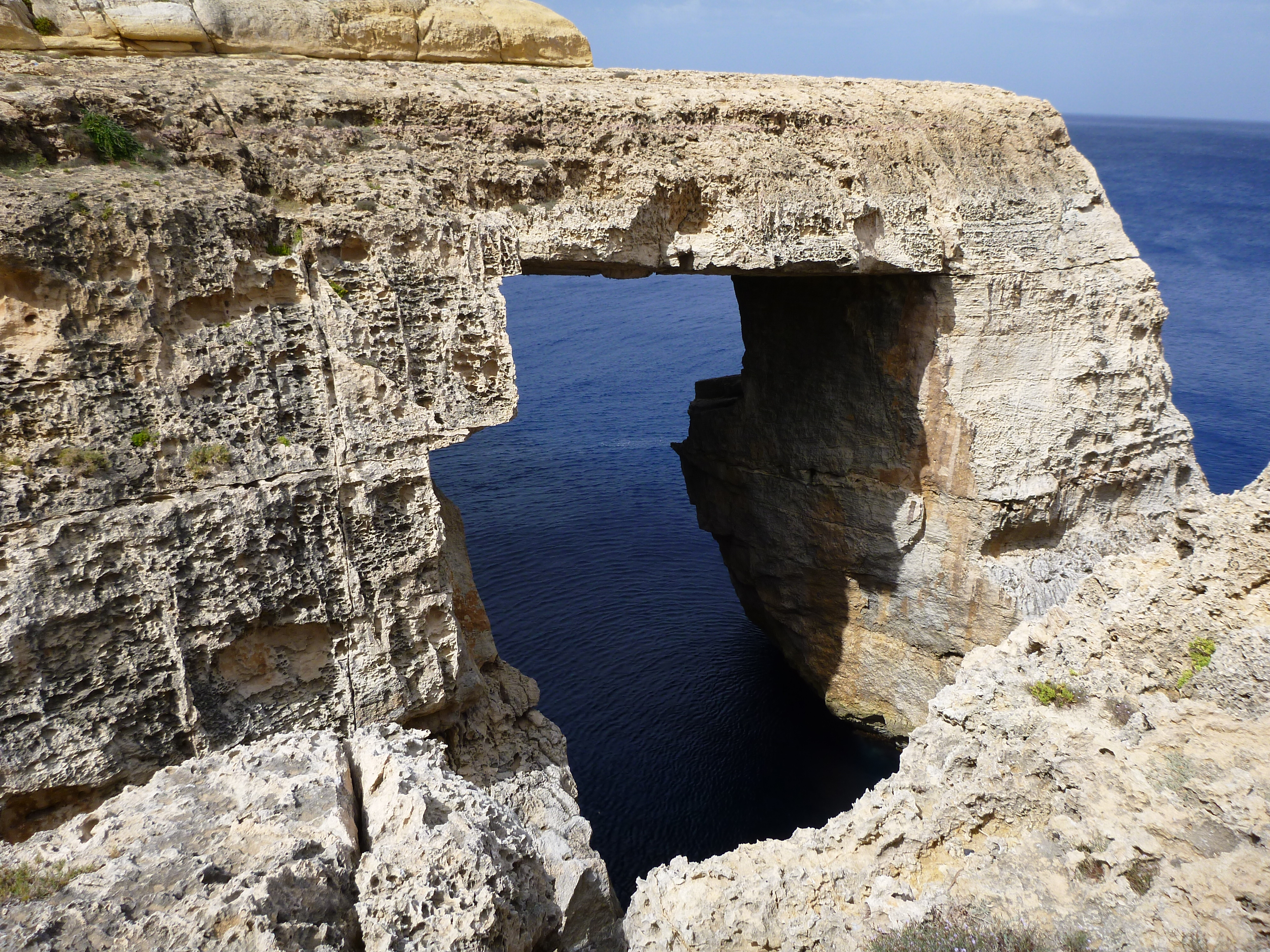
- View of the Wied il-Mielaħ Window
- Interactive map of Wied il-Mielaħ
- Location: Gozo, Malta
- Coordinates: 36°04′46.7″N 14°12′46.0″E

The Wied il-Mielaħ Window (Maltese: it-Tieqa ta' Wied il-Mielaħ) is a limestone natural arch on the north-western coast of the island of Gozo in Malta. It is located at the end of the valley Wied il-Mielaħ north of the village of Għarb. This natural arch is less well-known than the Azure Window, which collapsed in March 2017 following a heavy storm.

== Location ==
The Wied il-Mielaħ Window is at the end of the Wied il-Mielaħ Valley and is, unlike the more known Azure Window, on the west coast of Gozo. The road from Għarb leads directly to the coast; parking is available on the plateau on natural ground. Directly at the end of the valley, parallel to the old river bed, there is a narrow staircase along the rock to just before the window, almost to the water. Since the ceiling of the window is still thick, you can still enter the window above.

== Environment ==
The north coast from Gozo to the Xwejni Bay is characterized by a plateau, with steep cliffs, which slope down into the sea, where there are many caves. On the plateau, artificial salt pans were used to extract salt from the seawater by evaporation. The hinterland rises slowly here, there is Għarb and the lighthouse Giordan Lighthouse.

== Wastewater problem ==
In the past, the Wied il-Mielaħ Valley was responsible for discharging the wastewater from the surrounding municipalities to the Mediterranean directly at the Wied il-Mielah Window. The sewage flag was often clearly visible underneath the archway into the open sea. With the help of a €570,000 structural project, of which the European Union has financed 85%, the sewage is now cleaned in the sewage treatment plant in Ras il-Hobz and no longer reaches the sea via the valley. As part of the project, the road to the coast was renewed, six bridges replaced, some dams built and trees planted. With these measures one hopes for a higher attractiveness and more visitors at this rock gate. The valley was rehabilitated through the construction of six new small dams allowing better conservation of water.

== Use ==
As part of the initiative called 'EcoGozo', the area around the arch underwent a major renovation in recent years, allowing better access to the area by the construction of a new road, as well as a wider set of stairs which lead directly to the site next to the arch.

As part of the renovation project, the staircase to the window is to be expanded so that divers can enter the water here. Fences are installed on the western side of the window to allow the climbing of the vertical wall of the cliff. From Għarb a path leads to the window.

== Media appearances ==
The Wied il-Mielaħ Window and the Azure Window are seen in a 2017 Hugo Boss advert video featuring David Colturi.
