= Gozo Highspeed =

Maltese ferry company

Gozo Highspeed Limited
- Founded: 1 July 2023
- Headquarters: Valletta
- Area served: Gozo Channel; North-Eastern Malta
- Services: Passenger transportation
- Website: https://gozohighspeed.com/

Gozo Highspeed Limited is a Maltese company that operates fast ferry services between the islands of Gozo and Malta using catamarans.

== Overview ==
Gozo Highspeed was established on 1 July 2023 following the merger of Virtu Ferries Gozo and Gozo Fast Ferry, two companies which have been operating the service since the summer 1 June 2021.

Gozo Highspeed first sailed between Mġarr and Quarry Wharf, in the Grand Harbour. The trip takes 45 minutes. In September 2024, the Government announced that Gozo Highspeed will operate a fixed, year-round timetable for the Gozo to Valletta service, backed by an extra investment of €1.3million. The service was then running 16 daily return trips under the original €12million contract.

On 5 May 2026, Gozo Highspeed added routes from Mġarr to Buġibba and Sliema. The Sliema–Buġibba leg is free for Tallinja card holders, while the leg to Gozo is paid. The whole trip takes 75 minutes to complete, including a 15 mins stop in Bugibba.

Crossings happen throughout the day all-year round including weekends and public holidays but unlike Gozo Channel Line, it stops at night.

== Ridership ==
Clint Camilleri said 365,000 passengers used the service in its first year, 693,000 in 2023, and more than 409,000 in the first half of 2024. In May 2026, Prime Minister Robert Abela said the Valletta–Gozo fast ferry carried 1,025,000 passengers in 2025.

== Current Fleet ==
Image	Ship	Type	Length	Passengers	Design	Launched	Top Speed	Notes
	Gozo Express	High-speed craft	42.2m	322	Incat Crowther	2022	38kn	
	Malta Express	High-speed craft	42.2m	322	Incat Crowther	2025	38kn	
	Your Faith	High-speed craft	39m	300	Incat Crowther	2018	32kn	
	HSC Your Wisdom	High-speed craft	39m	300	Incat Crowther	2018	32kn	
	Your Magic	High-speed craft	39m	300	Incat Crowther	2023	32kn	
	San Frangisk	Air Cushion Catamaran	35m	310	Brodrene SA	1989	38kn	

== Former Fleet ==
Image	Ship	Type	Length	Passengers	Builder	Launched	Top Speed	Notes
	San Pawl	Air Cushion Catamaran	35m	310	Brodrene SA	1991	36kn	
