= Gozo farmhouse =

Type of dwelling in Gozo, Malta

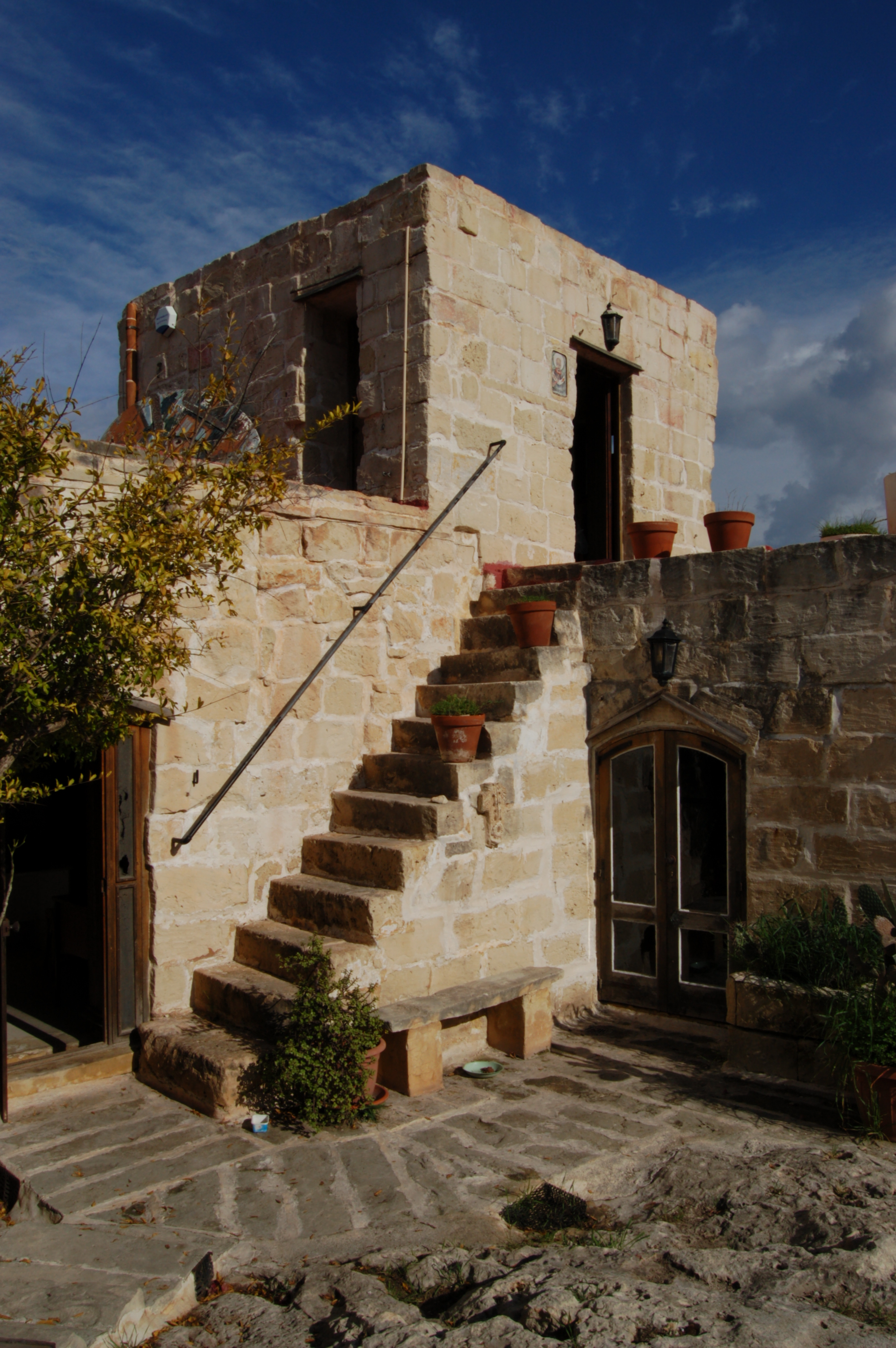
Typical farmhouse found in the Maltese Islands

A Gozo Farmhouse is a type of dwelling in Gozo, Malta. Because of the many foreign occupations that the Maltese islands have been through, the trading roads that were opened across the Mediterranean Sea and its numerous original influences, Malta and Gozo earned a very rich architectural heritage.

== Architecture and history ==
Two examples of this flourishing architecture are to be highlighted. Both are limestone vernacular-based, as this stone is the most used across the islands.

=== Giren ===
In the 5th millennium BC, neolithic farmers from Sicily brought a hut-building tradition with Asian origins. In the years 3800 BC, this transformed into a spectacular type of architecture. As in Stonehenge, megalithic constructions were sacred. According to Anthony Bonanno, they had medical or cosmic significance for the people. It is the next evolution of those huge rocks constructions that gave the giren we can find nowadays though Malta and Gozo.

The giren (singular: girna) were little constructions made for the mere needs of farmers and herdsmen. It has a double wall made of raw stone in order to protect the owner from hot summers, and its ceiling is usually dome-shaped. Though, we can find some square, rectangular or oval-shaped roofs (see Michel Rouvière's schemes).

The most beautiful and the largest circular giren are to be found in the stretch of fields and rocky ground between the Red Tower and Cirkewwa, while the largest square ones are to be found at Ix-Xaghra Il-Hamra, in the limits of Manikata.

=== Cubic architecture ===
Just as the previous giren type of construction, the cubic Maltese buildings find their roots in the islands' history and tradition. Back between 800 BC and AD 1200, Maltese islands were clearly part of the North African block, in opposition with what is stated nowadays with the European Union (2004). The Punic culture, which was settled since the control of Carthage in 400 BC, has never been abandoned through Roman occupation (between 218 B.C. and A.D. 455) and found its way until the 9th century with the Aghlabid Muslims of Tunisia who will remain in Malta archipelago during three centuries. At this state, the architecture was still humble. It is the European wars that begun in the 15th century that will change the shape of the buildings according to their taste, imprinted with the Renaissance and Baroque styles.

This is under those influences the primitive razzett - or farmhouse - began to take the shape we know nowadays and make them so famous among visitors and tourists.

In Companion to Contemporary Architectural Thought, Ben Farmer, Dr Hentie J. Louw, Hentie Louw and Adrian Napper linked the shapes of farmhouses of Malta and Gozo with cultural habits and needs from this period:

In about 1600, the introduction of the practice of living in closed settlements for security reasons in medieval Malta led to a reinterpretation of the basic cubic farmhouse layout. Community living, as opposed to extend family living, linked with the typically medieval Mediterranean tradition of walking to one's fields in the early morning and returning to the security of the village at sunset, let to the establishment of a typical village pattern of two distinct types. The earlier type consisted of a closely knit web of winding streets and alleys radiating from a central square, echoing the introverted central courtyard of the farmhouse building; the later type, most popular on Malta's sister island of Gozo, consisted of a sprawling pattern based on open-ended streets and alleys leading into the countryside, offering less security and introversion but infinitely more visual rapport with the terraced fields around the settlement.

== Industry ==
Originally most farmhouses are inherited by parents of Gozitan ascendency. As more than one million tourists visit Maltese islands each year, houses of character were restored and instead of selling them, owners often converted them to fit the security and comfort requirements people on vacancy have. Usually a private swimming pool is added in the yard to ease the hot summers. Nowadays several agencies give easy access for tourists to rent those typical accommodations.

The Tourism Minister Dr. Edward Zammit Lewis, in a ceremony on June the 1st of 2014, presented Eco-certificates to the first 7 farmhouses in Gozo that reached the required criteria of the scheme, which was launched in Gozo last year and is an extension of the sustainability certification scheme for hotels.

The first group of farmhouses that have been Eco-certified are located all over Gozo, the island that is known to be aiming at becoming more sustainable. Proof that this type of scheme, is another link in the chain of the vision of the Government to create an ecological island of Gozo by 2020 – 'Eco-Gozo.'

== Commerce ==
There are three main occasions for Maltese people: summer time, carnival and new year's. That is for the two last cases some farmhouses are equipped with an indoor pool, as otherwise it would be too cold for visitors to relax in water. Summer time is easiest to manage in terms of structure.

Maltese like to go to Gozo usually as groups, spending between 3 and 5 days as an escapade from usual routine. Generally speaking, they use this context to stay out of reach from the Internet, so they can evade the hassle of e-mails on mobile. Here in the farmhouse, they can remain by the pool all days, except to go for groceries, restaurants, and clubbing in the evening.

== See also ==
- Malta
- Gozo
- Islamic architecture
