= Is-Simar =

Nature reserve in Malta

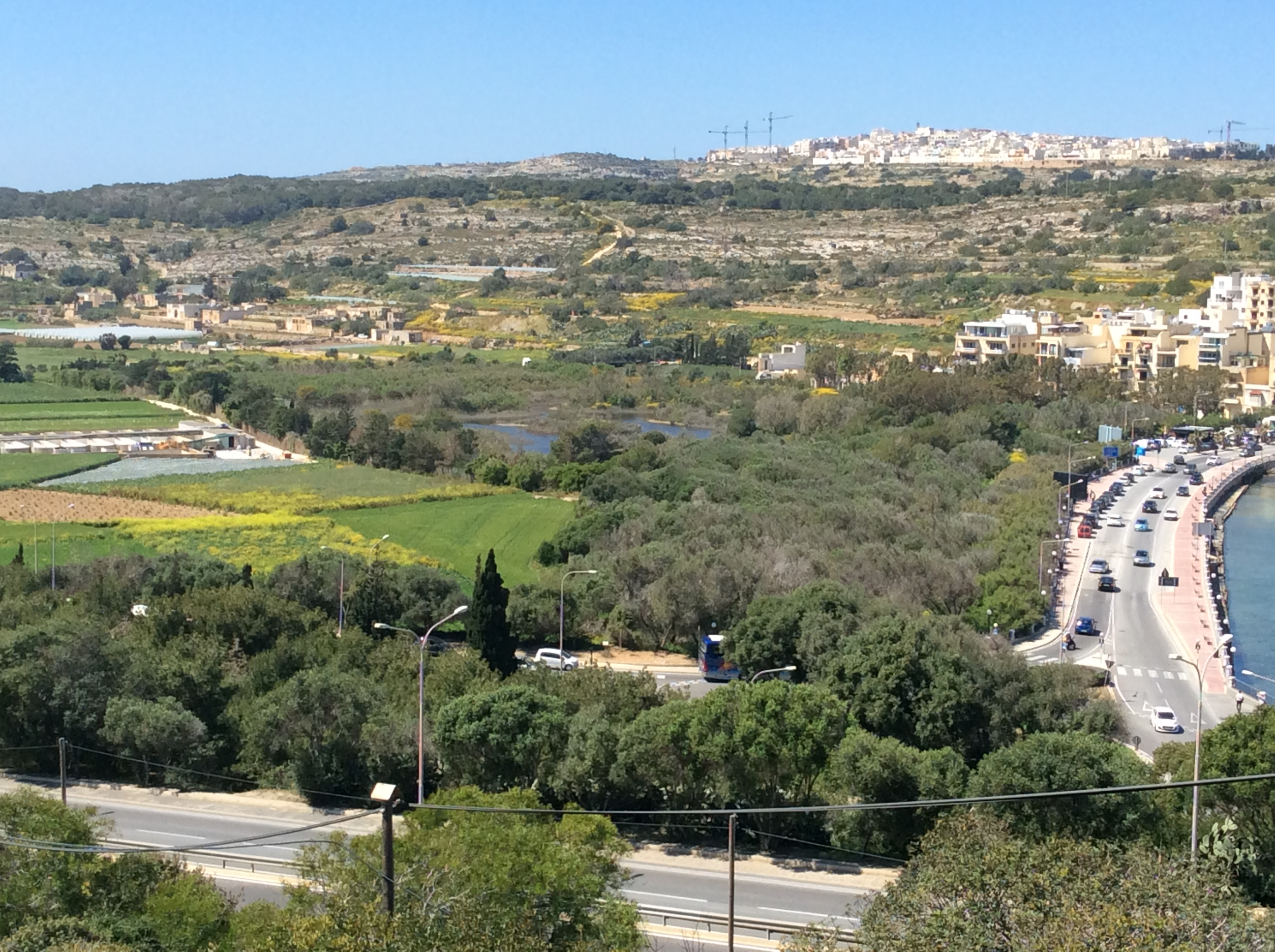
- Simar Nature Reserve (middle) from the hill of Wardija
- Interactive map of Is-Simar
- Location: Xemxija, Malta
- Coordinates: 35°56′44″N 14°22′56″E
- Area: 5 ha (12 acres)

Ramsar Wetland
- Official name: Is-Simar
- Designated: 29 January 1996
- Reference no.: 789

Simar Nature Reserve or Is-Simar is a nature reserve in Pwales Valley, in Xemxija, St Paul's Bay, Malta. An artificial wetland habitat was created on 5 hectares in the 1990s by BirdLife Malta volunteers in an area of abandoned marshland.

The reserve lies within the Is-Simar Special Protection Area, which has been a Ramsar Wetland of International Importance since January 1996, a protected bird sanctuary since 2006, and a Site of Community Importance since March 2008.

== See also ==
- Chadwick Lakes
- Buskett Gardens
