= Pwales =

Settlement in Malta

Coordinates: 35.9456°N 14.3764°E

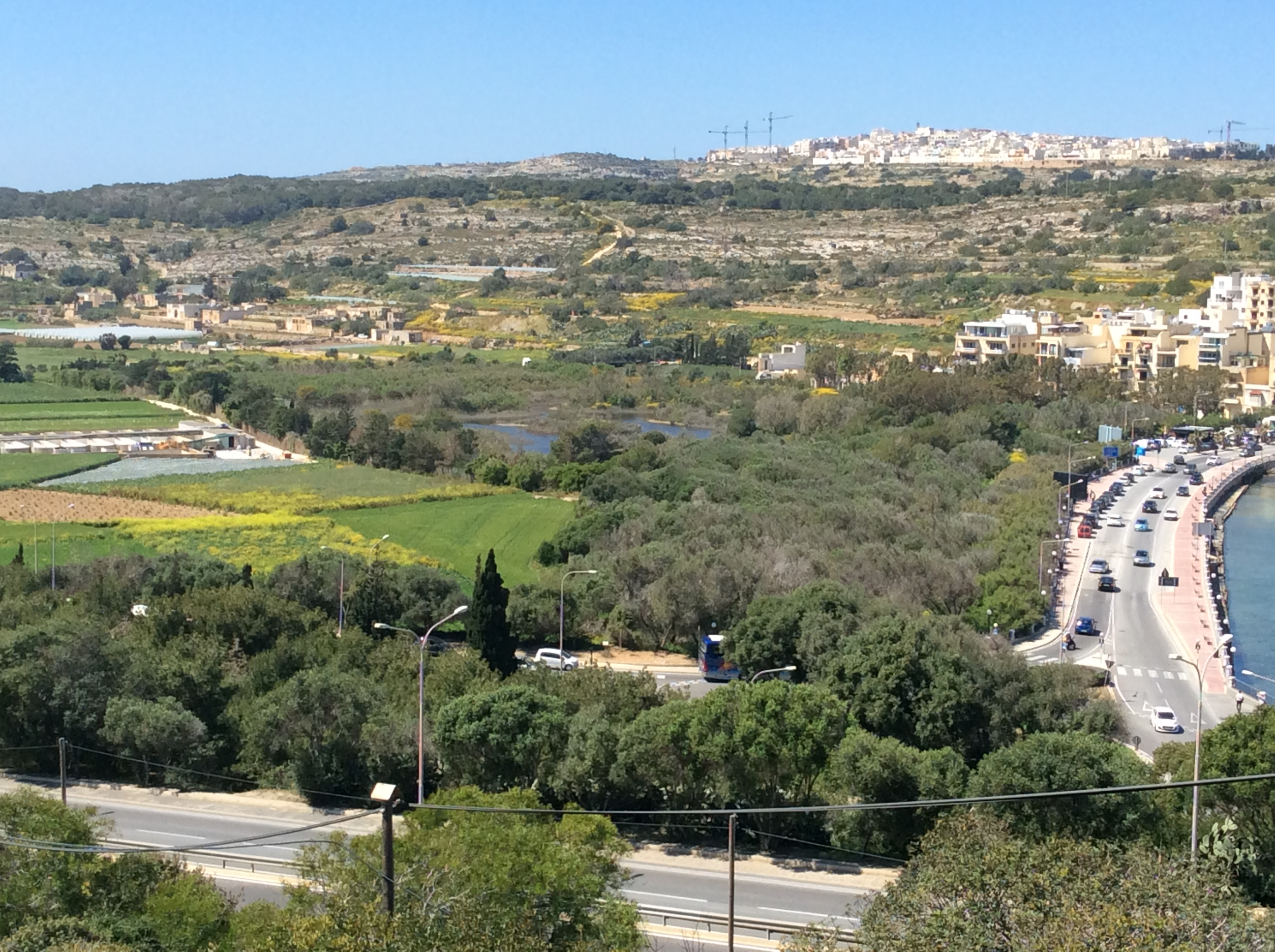
A view of Pwales from Wardija

Pwales is a settlement in St. Paul's Bay, Malta. The area was believed to have been named for its marshland, being a valley, and comes from the Latin word palus that means wetland. It is home to Is-Simar Nature Reserve, a number of farmhouses, and a church.

== History ==
The area around Pwales was believed to have been part of a Neolithic temple complex around 5,000 BC. Pwales was founded prior to 870 AD with the name alleged to have been derived from a corrupted form of the Latin terms palus for "swamp" and scala for "harbour" via an early Christian influence on Malta, though this view has been challenged as lacking scholarly acceptance. Due to its location within a nature reserve, there are often campaigns against any form of development in Pwales that could impact upon the bird sanctuary. These campaigns often get backing from non-governmental organisations.

During the Second World War, Italy made plans to invade Malta by landing troops in Pwales, though the British authorities had previously envisaged such an invasion plan and had the Royal Engineers construct a network of pillboxes along Pwales Bay, with field guns and anti-tank guns being added to the emplacements.

== Church ==
The church's origins are unknown but it is known that it was reconsecrated in 1672. During the French occupation of Malta by Napoleonic forces, the church was desecrated by French soldiers using the door for target practice and bayonetting a statue of the Virgin Mary, destroying it. The church was restored in 2004.
