= Castello Dei Baroni =

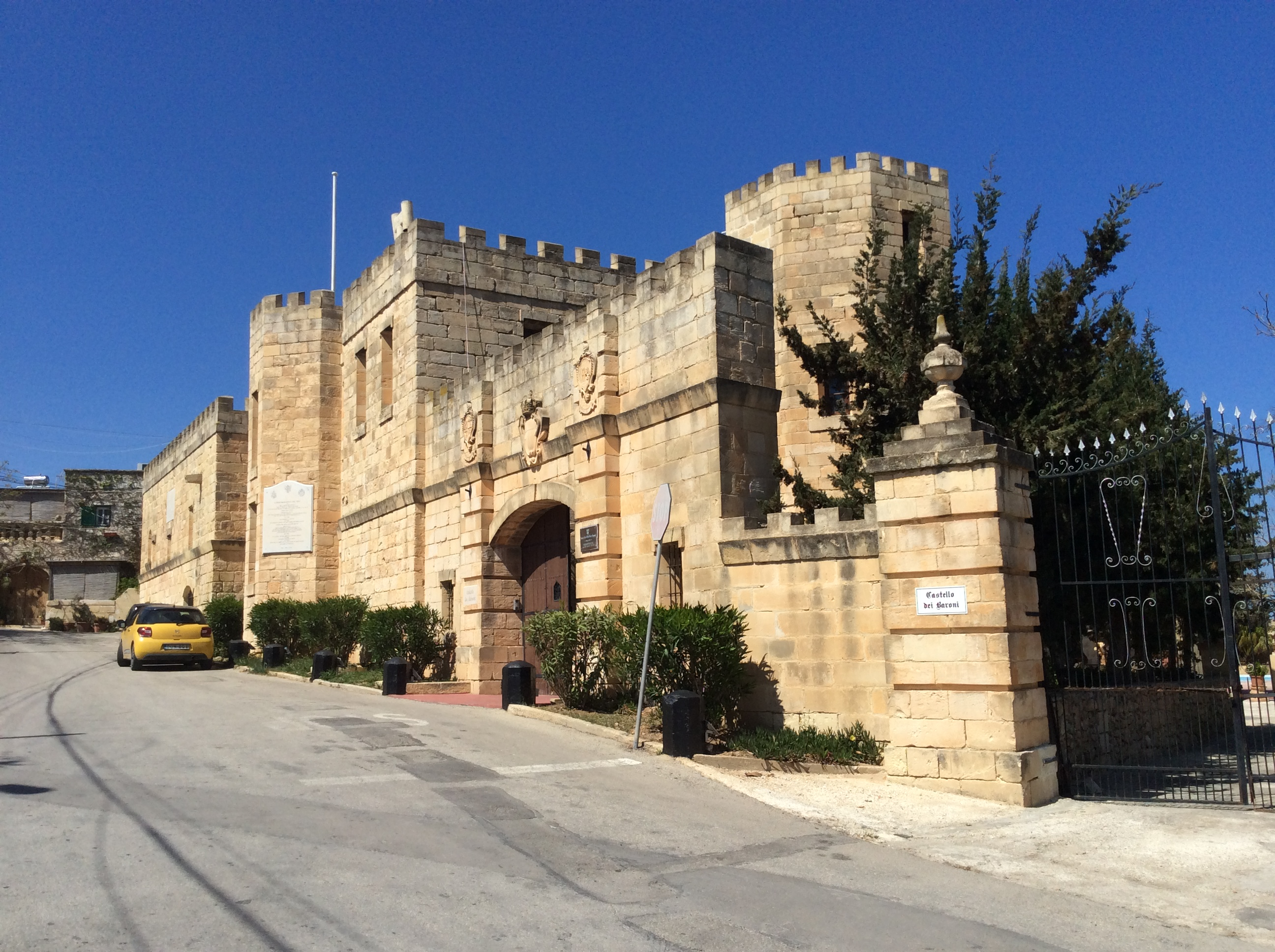

General information
- Status: Intact
- Type: Residence
- Location: Wardija, St. Paul's Bay, Malta
- Coordinates: 35°56′15.8″N 14°23′34.7″E
- Named for: Barons Montalto
- Completed: 20th-century

Technical details
- Material: Limestone
- Floor count: 2
- Floor area: 11240 m sq

Website
- castellodeibaroni.com

Castello Dei Baroni
- Established: 14 February 2010
- Type: House museum
- Collection size: Antique literature, old photos, falconry display, hunting methods

Castello Dei Baroni is a 20th-century residence in Wardija, Malta. In the 18th century, during the magistracy of Grand Master Emmanuel de Rohan-Polduc, a rural building was constructed on site. The Montalto family owned the whereabouts of its site in the 20th century, and built the Castello Dei Baroni, incorporating the old structure. It was then purchased by Adrian Busietta and Maria Caruana, when it was renovated into a mock castle and given its name. It has since then mainly served as a wedding reception.

Busietta and Caruana enlarged and renovated the building which for a period served as the headquarters of the Ecumenical Order, and for third parties activities. The building remains open to the public, against payment, as a house museum, exhibiting a number of items. It is occasionally used for charity purposes and other initiatives. It is found in a remote area.

It is a limestone building with two floors and a back garden. The main layout of the interior feature the intact 18th-century building, a spacious hall, a library, a typical Grand Master bedroom, and a chapel. Visitors are offered an audio visual about the history of the Ecumenical Order, and to view a hunting exhibition. Busietta died in 2016, after which the building was put for sale.

== Location ==
The building is found in the hamlet of Wardija, on a site which was originally known as Ta' Tanti, as meaning "the land of Tanti". Tanti is a Maltese surname, which may suggest the owner of the land prior development. It is found at the inner side of the hamlet. The address is now Castello Dei Baroni, Triq Madonna Tal-Abbandunati (Our Lady of the Abandoned Street), Wardija, SPB 07. Other sources claim a different name to the street as St. George's Street, as probably know to locals due to the nearby church named for Saint George, but it has been used in official documents.

The building is open to the public against payment during the week, from Monday to Friday from 9am to 2pm. Prior booking is required and other arrangements, such as the reasons for visiting. Generally people visit the premises when renting it as a wedding hall, for private dinners or some drinks, or cultural interest. To reach the building, by public transport, people can go by bus and stop at a bus stop in the nearby hamlet of Burmarrad. At this point, a short thirty minutes walk uphill, while crossing through Wardija, is needed to get to the building. Other ways to arrive is by using own transport or direct arrangement with the hosts.

== History ==
The Castello Dei Baroni is believed to be a structure built over what may have been a peasants' lodge dating back to the rule of the Order of St. John. In around 1783, during the magistracy of Grand Master Emmanuel de Rohan-Polduc, peasants built a roofed structure in the land owned by a Maltese noble family. The structure was originally a small Maltese farmhouse, today consisting of at least one room, which may have been used at some point in the 18th century as a hunting lodge. It may have been used by the knights of the Order of St. John, but there is no historic certainty over such claim.

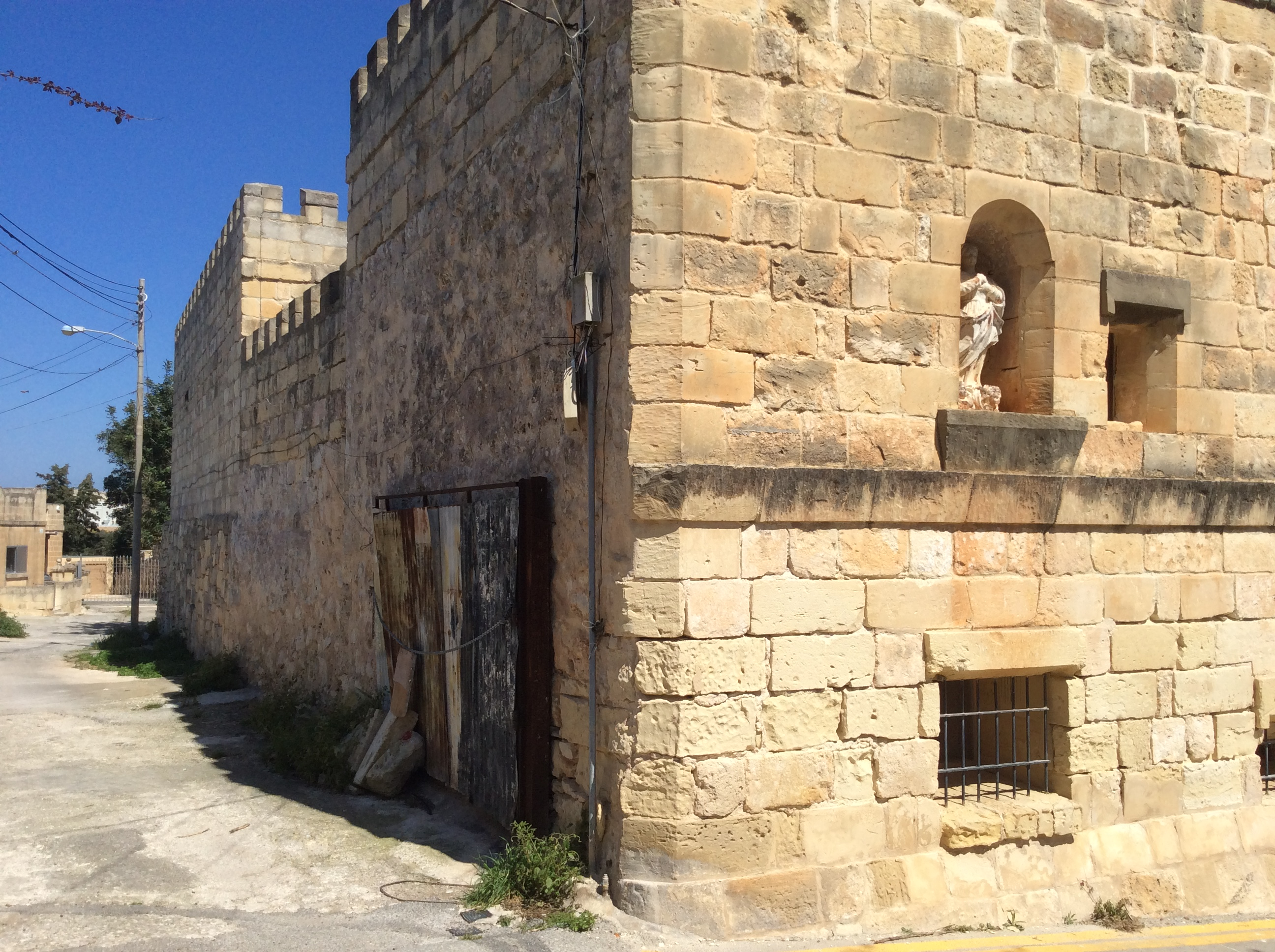
Part of the 1783 roofed-structure can be seen (left) incorporated with the façade of the Castello Dei Baroni

In the 20th century, the site of the present Castello Dei Baroni was an uncultivated agricultural field incorporating the 18th-century building and rubble walls. Sometime in the early 20th century, the Attard Montalto family built the Castello Dei Baroni, presumably named after the Barons of the family, and used it as a country residence. The Barons probably used it as a hunting lodge, and thus it may be said to have been a baronial hunting lodge.

Adrian Busietta, the later owner of the residence, was born on 14 January 1935 to William Busietta and Evelyn (née Casolani), a working-class family. He went on to become a banker, businessman, and the president of the Malta Chamber of Commerce.

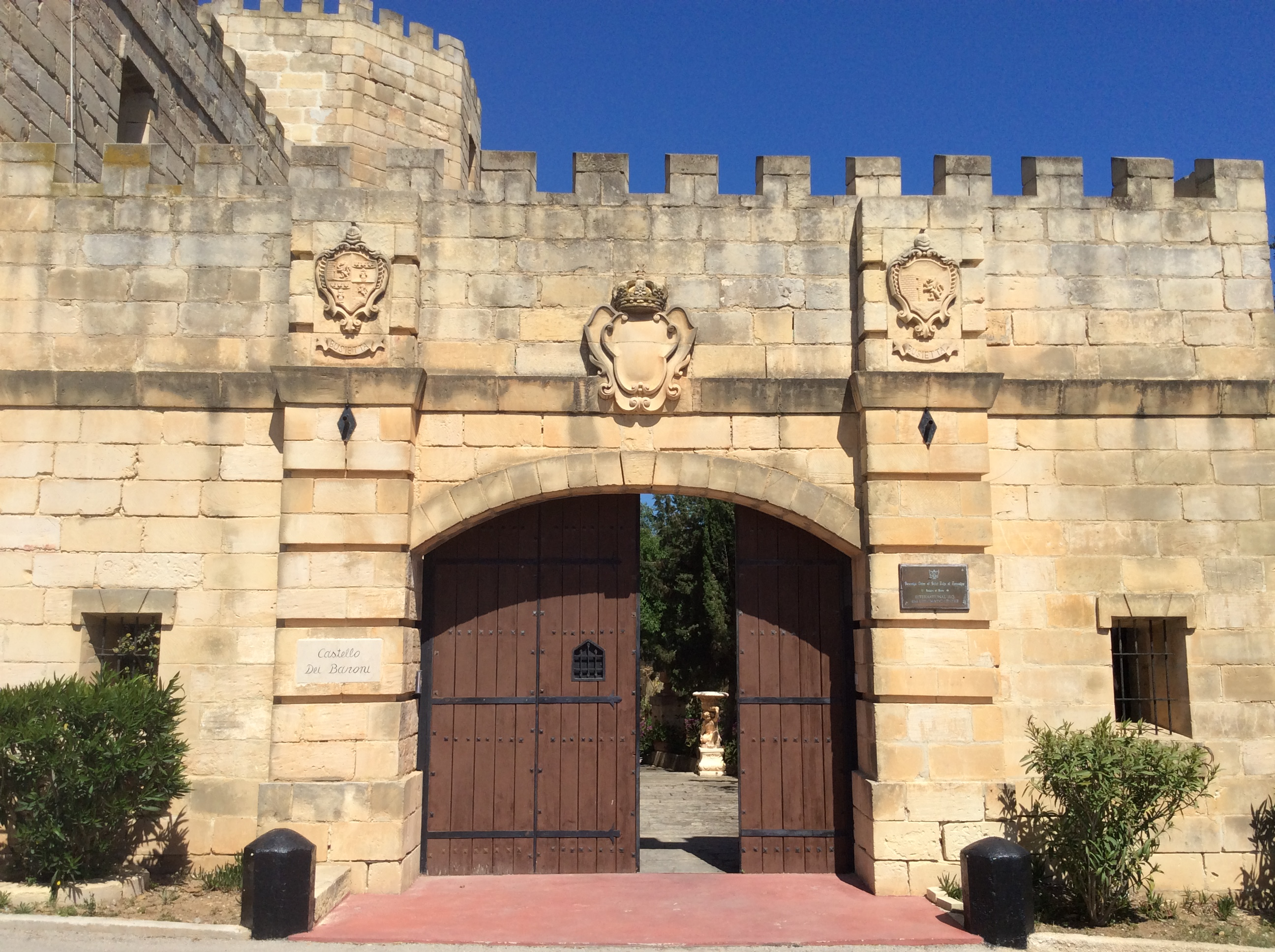
Entrance gate with the Busietta and Caruana coat-of-arms

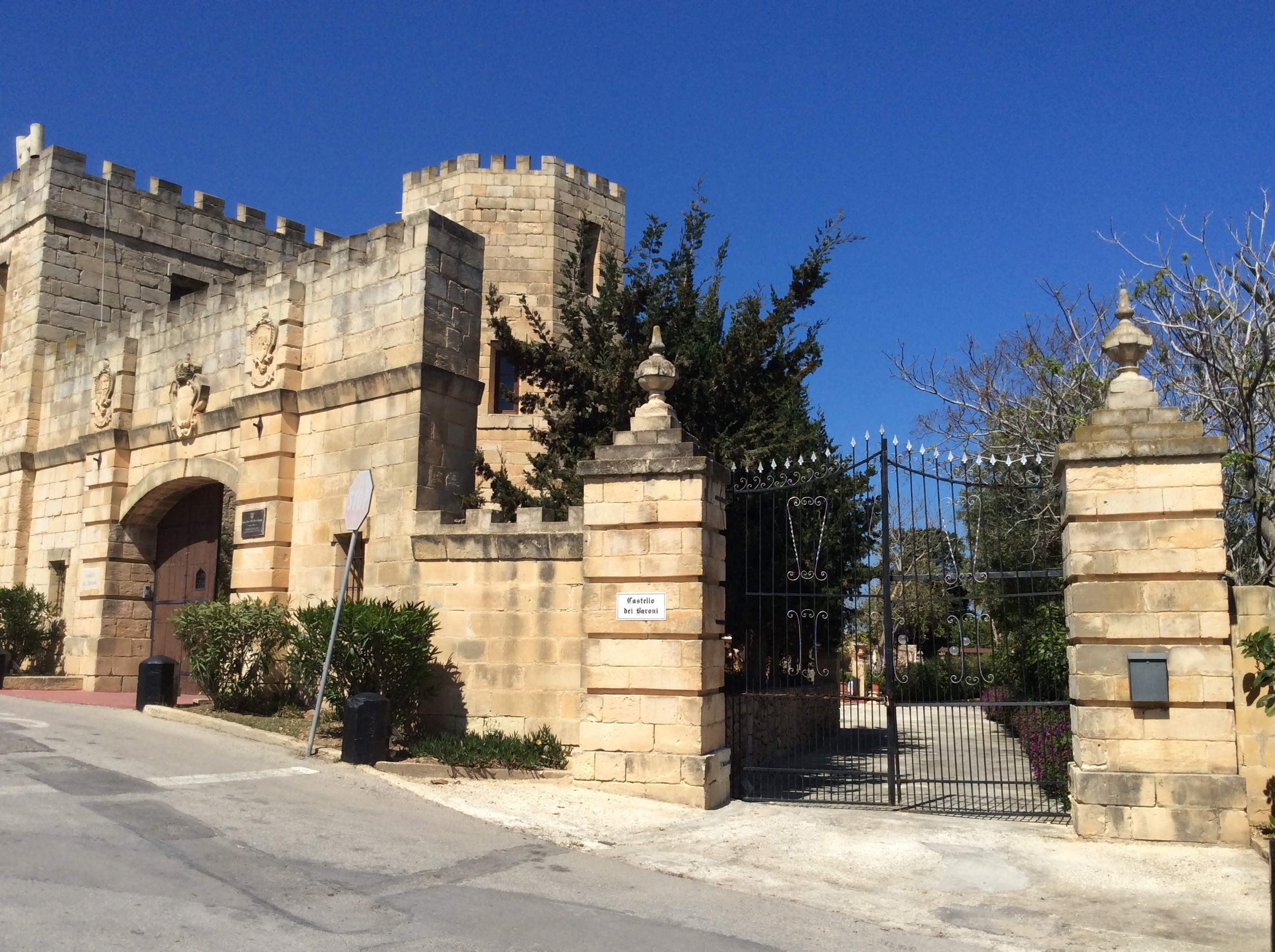
Main entrance gate, and drive-in gate opening to the path leading to the garden

Around January 1965, Busietta and Caruana, the later ‘Duke’ and a ‘Dame’ of the Ecumenical Order, bought the Castello Dei Baroni but it was claimed in a court sitting under oath that it was not intended and never used as a residence. Together, they made projects to renovate the residence with modern needs. The couple restored the 18th-century building, enlarged the property at different points, decorated it with typical 17th- and 18th-century fittings, and adapted with necessarily requirements.

The interior of the building features prominently a chamber for the Supreme Council, also used for entertainment purposes and events. The chamber is the main setting for activities hosted by the Grand Master and the Duke, and other official decisions by the Ecumenical Order. The building incorporates a library with literature dating to the 16th century onward, including books and manuscripts. Another room for official use is the lavishly styled dining area, which is used for events of the Ecumenical Order and occasionally by third parties. A spacious room in the building is used as a chapel. The hosts have recreated an upstairs bedroom with typical 17th-century fittings for a Grand Master.

The now spacious building made it ideal as the headquarters for the Ecumenical Order, a function which hosted since 1991. It is the seat for public relations and diplomacy, officially known as the "Headquarters of the Knights Hospitallers of the Sovereign Order of Saint John of Jerusalem" (OSJ) but simply known also officially as "the Ecumenical Order." It is also sometimes known as the American Order, the Shickshinny Order and the Cumbo Order.

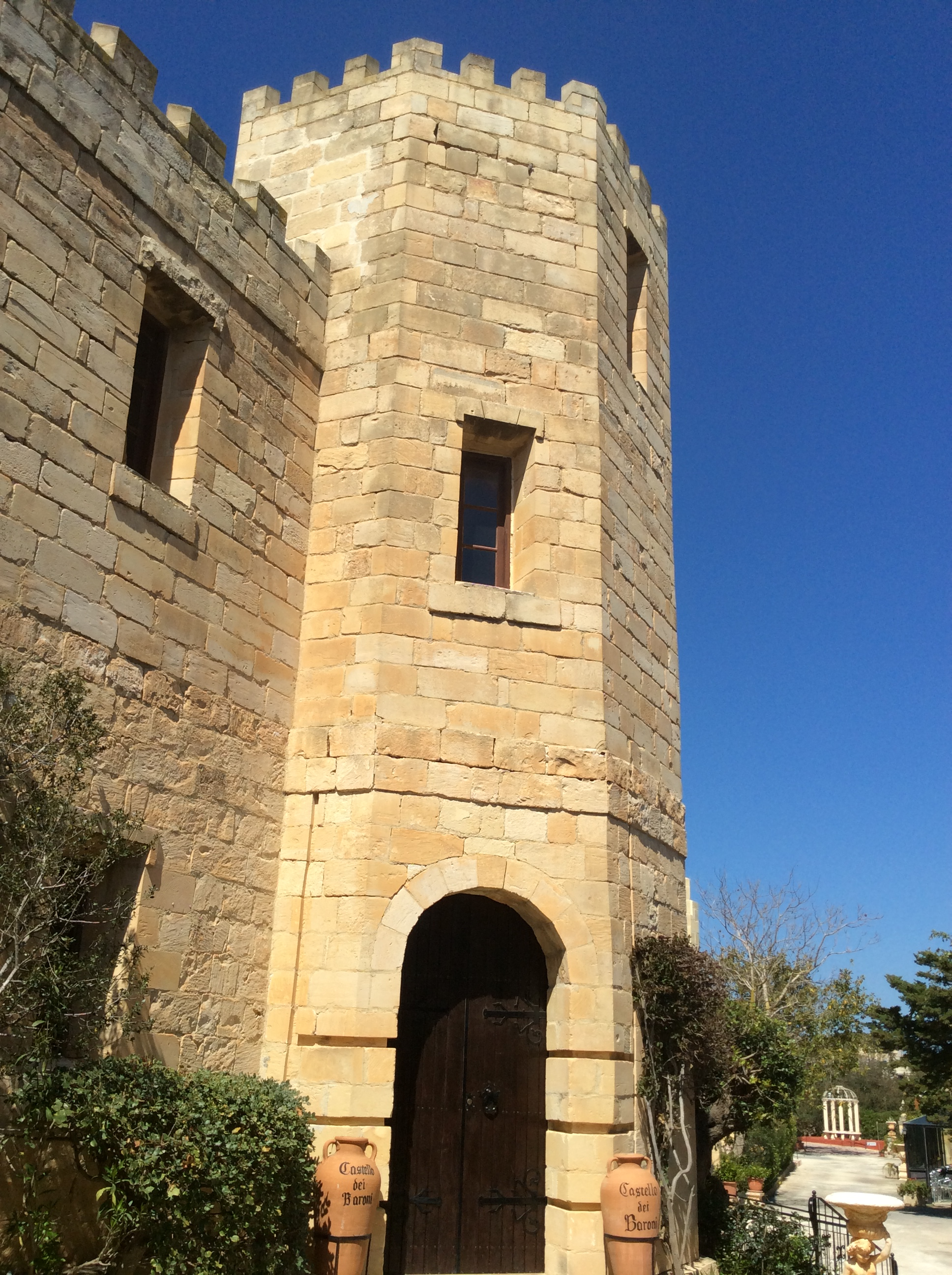
One of the turrets of the building leads to the roof

The Ecumenical Order is one of many listed "Unrecognised Orders" putting claim on the successors of the Order of St. John, however with some international recognition. By the early 19th century, the original Order of St. John became defunct but various orders put claim over it; one of the Orders is the Ecumenical Order which is believed to be based on the Russian tradition dating back to Tsar Paul I in 1810 and to their split American Order in 1890 or 1908. Since 1997, the Prince and Grand Master of the Order was Joseph Frendo Cumbo, who adds to his name the title Torre Sarocca, and resided in Canada. Roberto Paterno acts as the Prince and Grand Master Emeritus. Other notable individuals are Derrick Langford, the Grand Chancellor and Busietta himself was the Grand Prior of Malta. Busietta and others claim titles of nobility but there is no historic prove in support, and in any case such titles in Malta have been void since the 1970s. After the sudden death of Cumbo in 2006 and the disassociation of Nicholas Papanicolaou in 2011, Busietta was elected as the 78th Grandmaster of the Ecumenical Order and was eventually replaced on 2 May 2015 by Sandor Habsburg-Lothringen due to his declining health.

A notable event, at the building, was the declaration of knighthood to new members or to allocate a higher rank in the hierarchy of the Order. A distinctive given knighthood was that of Kingsley Fletcher in 2009. He had by then already donated millions of dollars' worth, with the provision of goods and services, to the Ecumenical Order for their charity around the World.

The building was chosen to appear as a setting for a film, named "Johnny to the West", as the palace of an African monarch in 2005. Prime Minister Lawrence Gonzi, in an official visit in 2010, re-inaugurated the property as a historic site and a tourist attraction. The event was reported by various national media, including the Times of Malta and The Malta Independent.

The building has been available for wedding receptions since the late 20th century, when it was for the first time open to the public for special occasions, and remains a host for various private events. By the 21st century, the 18th-century structure was converted into a small hunting related museum, an audio visual takes visitors around the building telling the history of the Ecumenical Order, and the ground floor is used occasionally for exhibitions and charity occasions.

Upon Busietta's death at Mater Dei Hospital on 14 July 2016, Caruana applied for agricultural-related development of the surroundings of Castello Dei Baroni with the Planning Authority on 13 September of the same year.

A wedding reception which took place on 20 September 2018, had undesirable outcome when electricity was not adequate for the event and a settlement for damages ended in a 5 years court hearings, with a final verdict in favour of the clients to be partially compensated.

== Architecture ==
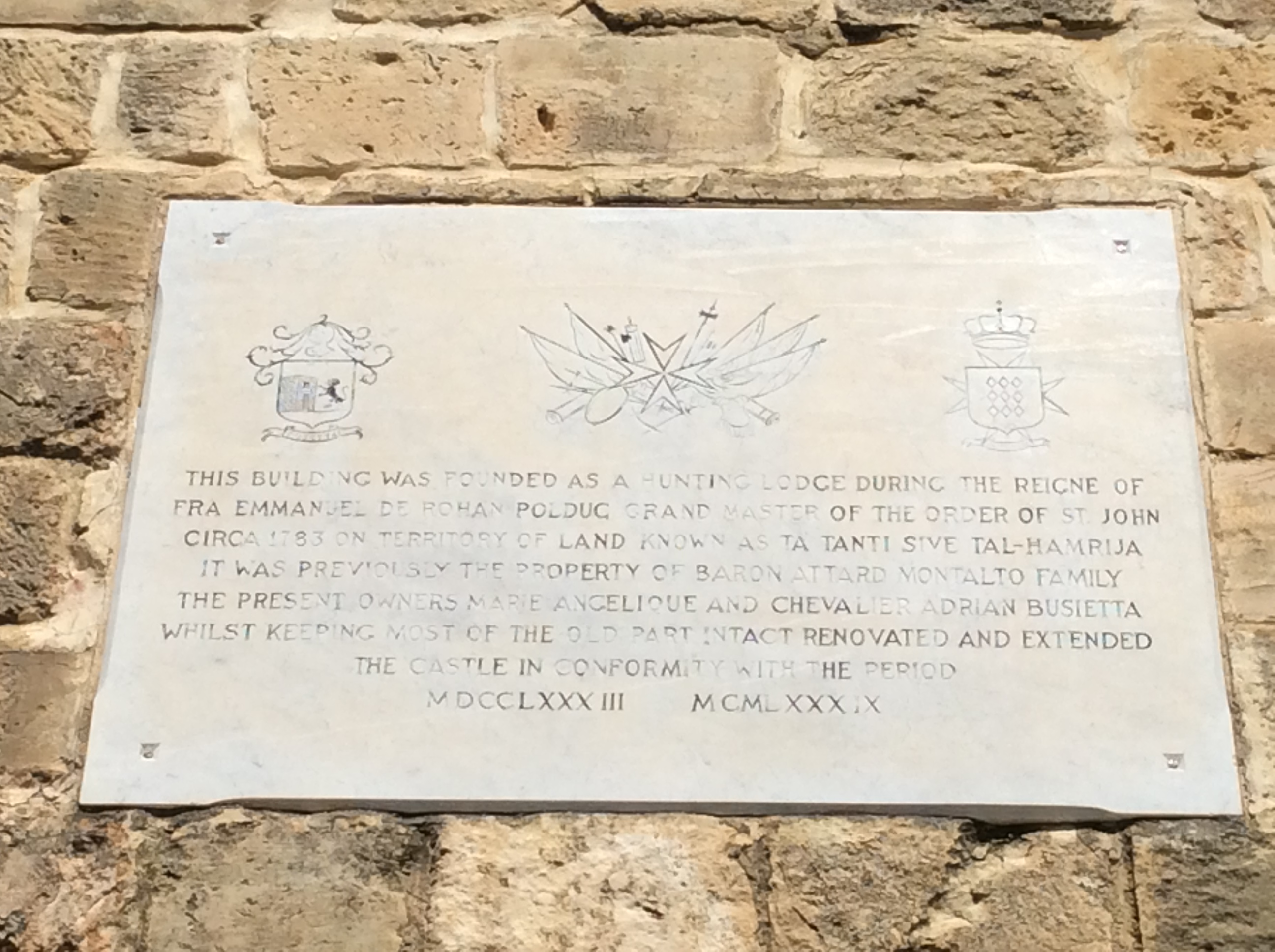
Plaque about the building's history

The building has two floors and a cellar, and an 18th-century one-room building was incorporated in the design.

The exterior of the building has castle-like features for decorative purposes and romantic aesthetic appease. Busietta has described the whereabouts of the property as insecure and a spot for robberies, for which reason a €8,442.96 security system was installed sometimes before 2006. The bill for the service and goods of the system was not paid immediately, leading to a court case in 2012 when it was revealed that Busietta and Caruana were in a bad economic state.

The interior architecture and fittings are of modest classic design, giving the building a romantic appearance, and fitted with belonging spanning over several periods since the 16th century.

The property has an extensive cultivated garden that can be accessed from the drive in or the building.

A plaque on the façade tells the story of the building in short.

The plaque reads:

THIS BUILDING WAS FOUNDED AS A HUNTING LODGE DURING THE REIGNE OF

FRA EMMANUEL DE ROHAN POLDUC GRAND MASTER OF THE ORDER OF ST. JOHN
CIRCA 1783 ON TERRITORY OF LAND KNOWN AS TA' TANTI SIVE TAL-ĦAMRIJA
IT WAS PREVIOUSLY THE PROPERTY OF BARON ATTARD MONTALTO FAMILY
THE PRESENT OWNERS MARIE ANGELIQUE AND CHEVALIER ADRIAN BUSIETTA
WHILST KEEPING MOST OF THE OLD PART INTACT RENOVATED AND EXTENDED
THE CASTLE IN CONFORMITY WITH THE PERIOD
MDCCLXXXIII MCMLXXXIX

As part of the exterior front facade, the building has two tower structures and with one of them having affixed another plaque reading:

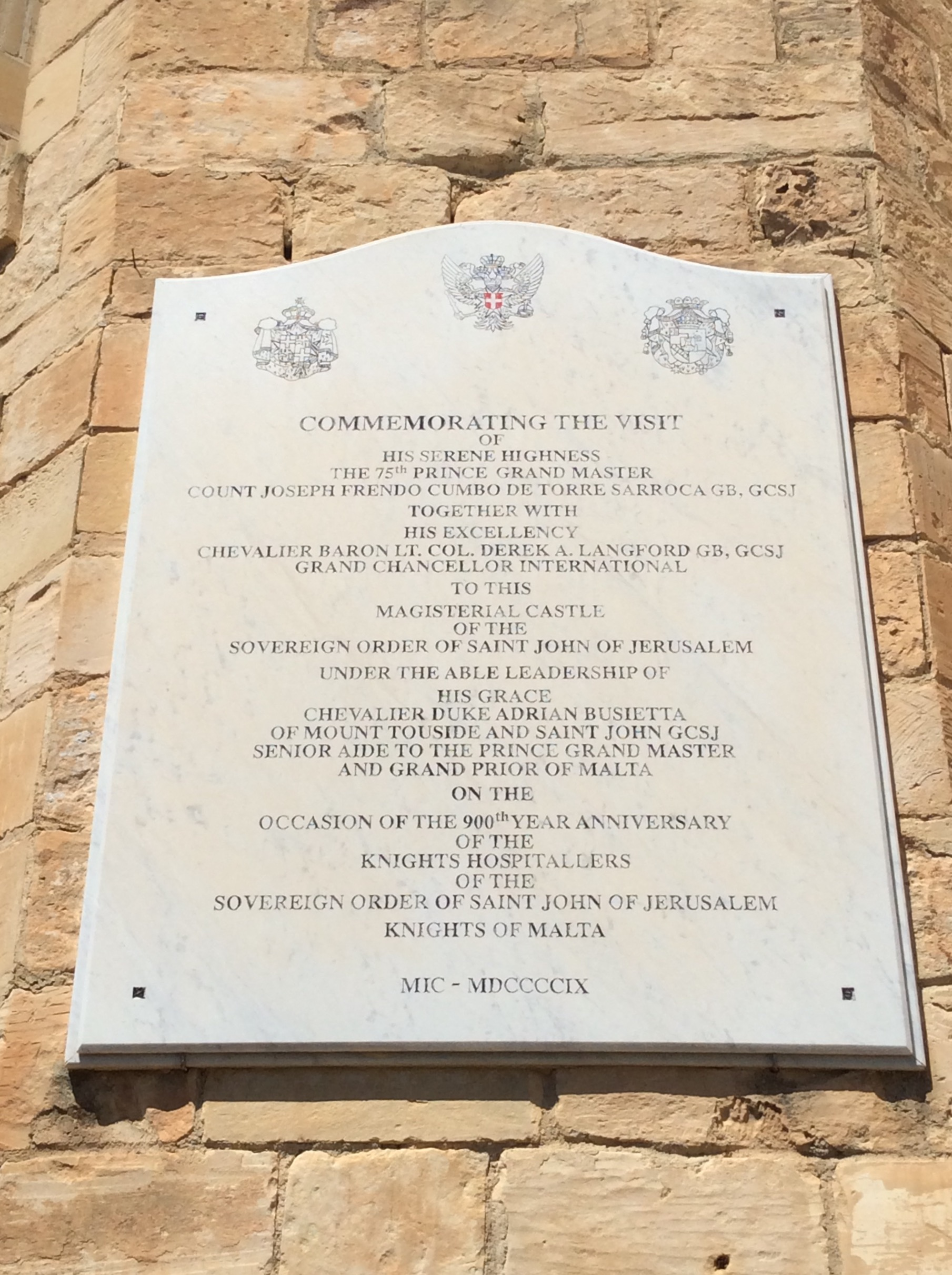
Plaque commemorating the visit by the Grand Master

COMMEMORATING THE VISIT

OF
HIS SERENE HIGHNESS
THE 75th PRINCE GRAND MASTER
COUNT JOSEPH FRENDO CUMBO DE TORRE SAROCCA GB, GCSJ
TOGETHER WITH
HIS EXCELLENCY
CHEVALLIER BARON LT. COL. DEREK A. LANGFORD GB, GCSJ
GRAND CHANCELLOR INTERNATIONAL
TO THIS MAGISTERIAL CASTLE
OF THE
SOVEREIGN ORDER OF SAINT JOHN OF JERUSALEM
UNDER THE ABLE LEADERSHIP OF
HIS GRACE
CHEVALIER DUKE ADRIAN BUSIETTA
OF MOUNT TOUSIDE AND SAINT JOHN GSC
SENIOR AIDE TO THE PRINCE GRAND MASTER
AND GRAND PRIOR OF MALTA
ON THE
OCCASION OF THE 900th YEAR ANNIVERSARY
OF THE
KNIGHTS HOSPITALLERS
OF THE
SOVEREIGN MILITARY ORDER OF SAINT JOHN OF JERUSALEM
KNIGHTS OF MALTA

MXCIX - MCMXCIX

== The Ecumenical Order ==
The Ecumenical Order of Saint John (OSJ)
- Flag of The Ecumenical Order
- Named after: Knights Hospitallers
- Formation: 1890 or 1908
- Founded at: United States of America
- Type: Chivalry
- Registration no.: 49292
- Legal status: Active
- Purpose: Charity
- Location: Wardija, Malta
- Official language: American English, Latin

The Ecumenical Order of Saint John (OSJ) is a registered organization in Malta and other western countries. Under Maltese law, it carries the registration number 49292 and gives the conditional rights to use titles with:

(a) the words 'The Knights Hospitallers of the Sovereign Order of St. John of Jerusalem' only when used together;
(b) the words 'Knights of Malta' only when used together; and
(c) the words 'The Ecumenical Order' only when used together and only when used with the words above.

The headquarters of the organization was officially lodged at the Castello Dei Baroni.

== See also ==
- Wardija
- Castello Lanzun
