= Wardija =

Wardija Il-Wardija
- Hamlet in St. Paul's Bay
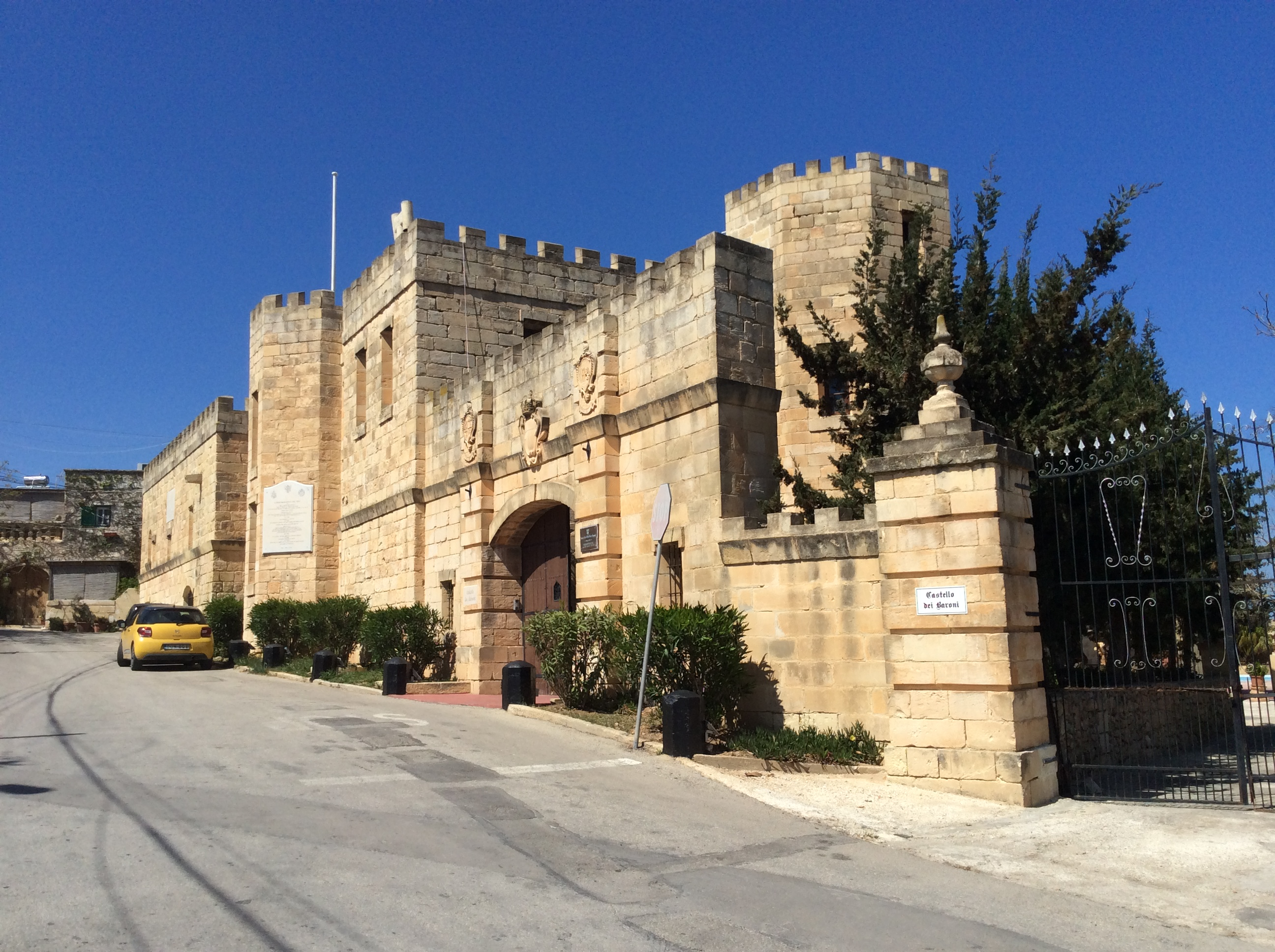
- View of the Castello Dei Baroni
- Interactive map of Wardija
- Coordinates: 35°56′16.65″N 14°23′33.15″E
- Country: Malta
- Time zone: UTC+1 (CET)
  - Summer (DST): UTC+2 (CEST)
- Postal code: SPB
- ISO 3166 code: MT

Wardija is a hamlet in St. Paul's Bay, Malta, about 363 feet above sea level. Its name is corrupted from the Sicilian or Italian word guardia, meaning 'to watch'). Although the name of the hamlet has Arabic lexicons, it was probably named later when Maltese, then an Arabic dialect, remained a dominant language. The hamlet is bordered by Bidnija, Buġibba, San Martin and Pwales. Several archeological remains found around the vicinity prove that it was inhabited in pre-history and the Roman period, and it has always been mainly a rural village. From the 16th till the 18th centuries it saw a shift to a hunting zone with the construction of several hunting lodges and chapels.

A number of knights and noble families built their country residences, originally to be used for hunting and retreats. A number of 19th and 20th century structures were also erected in the area. Some houses are still owned by the descendants of the original builders, while others are now used for multiple purposes such as private homes, commercial accommodation, for holding events and weddings receptions. There are two schools, one for local students and one for foreign students.

There are a number of public and private chapels dating from the rule of the Order of St. John till the 20th century. Some houses have buttressed walls, possibly for defense purposes or general support, while other have defense features exclusively for decorative intent. A World War I battery was constructed in the vicinity of Wardija, and its gun emplacements are still on site. A rental complex, known as the Wardija Hilltop Village, and the Headquarters of the Ecumenical Order, known as Castello Dei Baroni, are located at the inner part of Wardija.

Wardija consist of a low and high land, its hill is a plateau, and Qannotta Valley is located within its boundaries. Rain water in Wardija is vital for agriculture, as a primary source of production, while it also flows into areas around such as to the now defunct Xemxija Aqueduct. Some lands in Wardija enjoy a conservation status from the Environment and Resources Authority, while there are also pre-historic cart-ruts enjoying conservation from the Planning Authority.

== Buildings ==
=== Notable residences ===
There are three Roman period villas at Wardija, all of which are in ruins.

Wardija has a concentration of historic country residences.

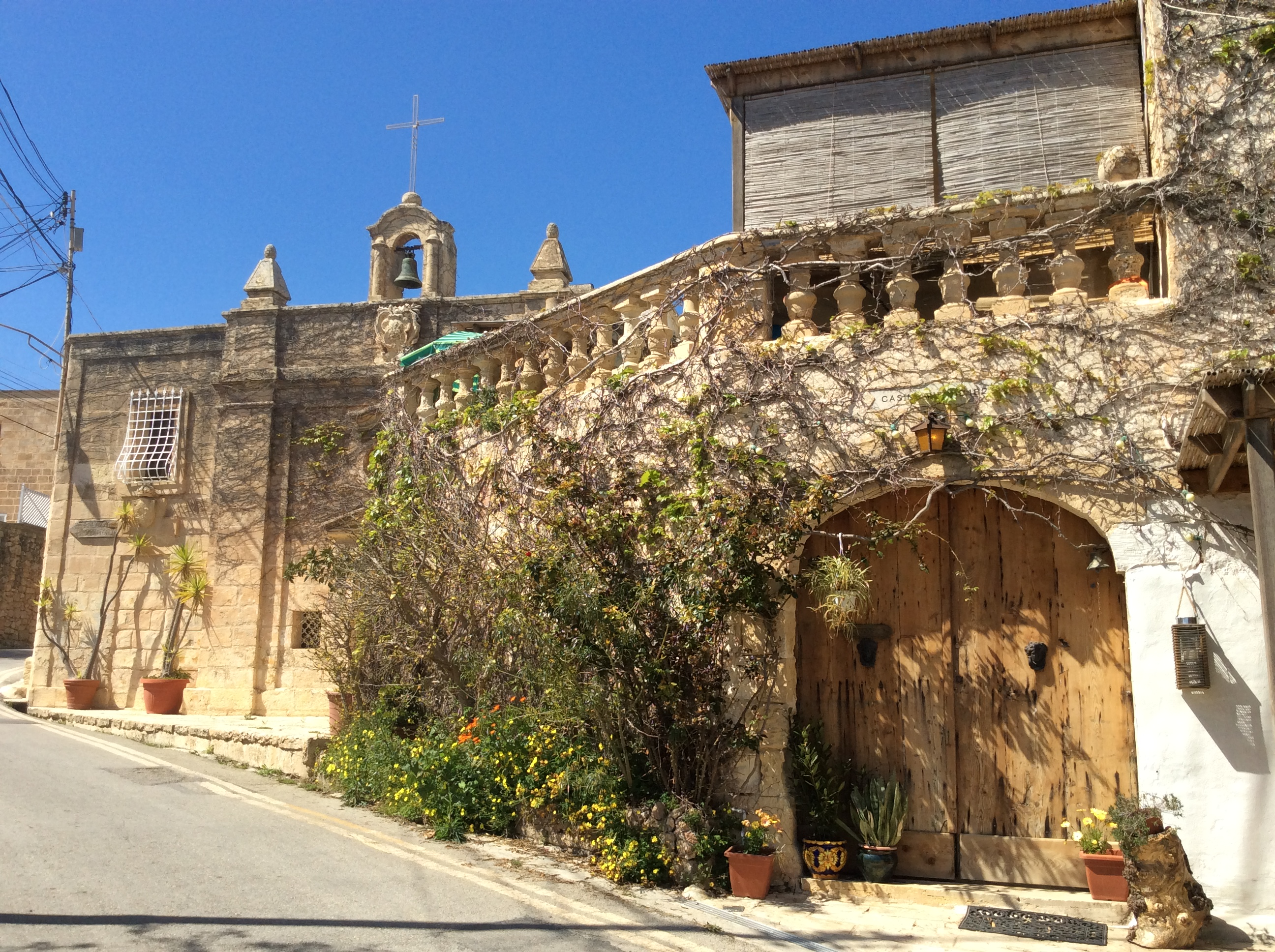
Casino Mifsud and the Chapel of St. George

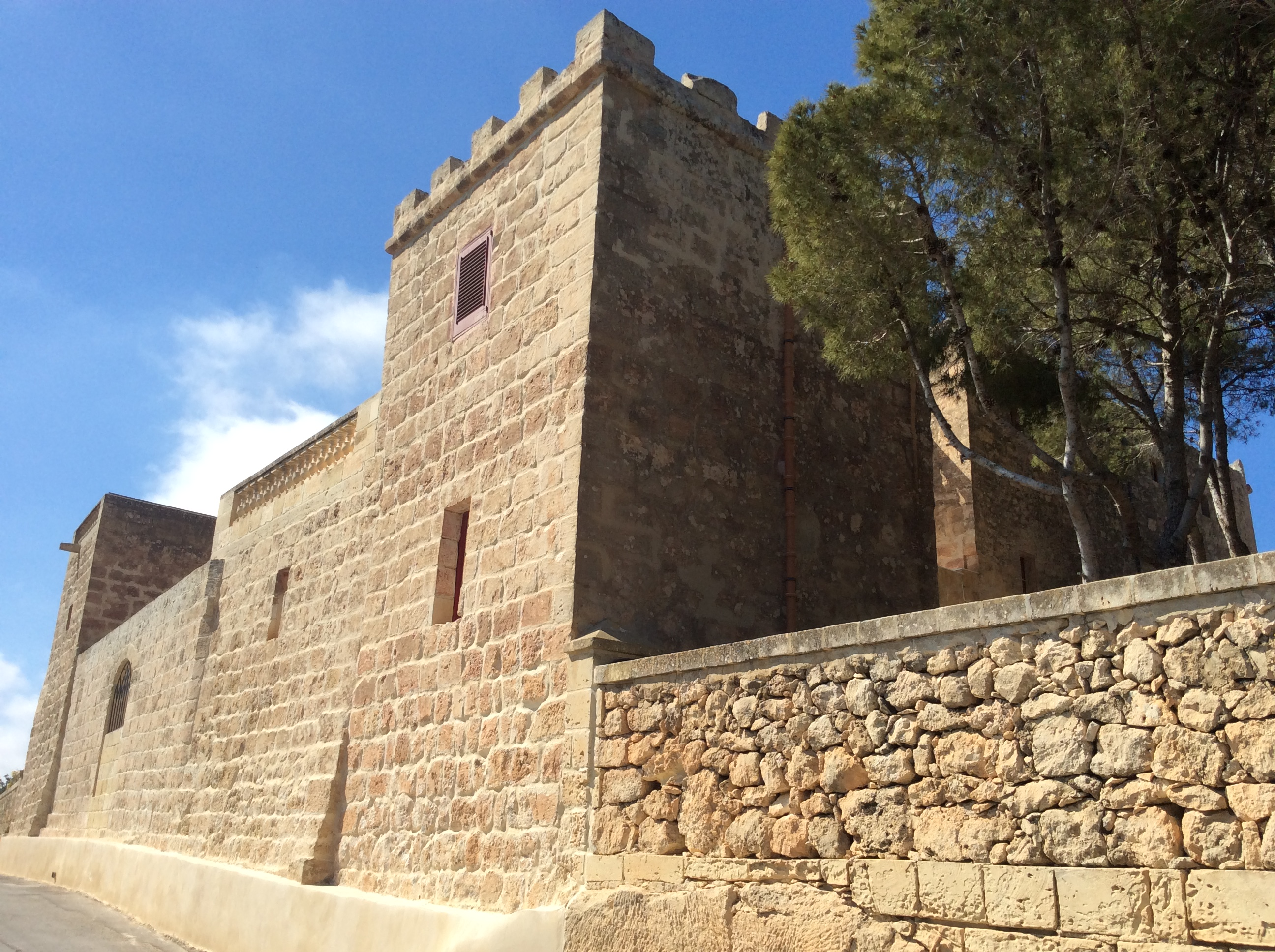
Qannotta Castle, built by Grand Master Perellos

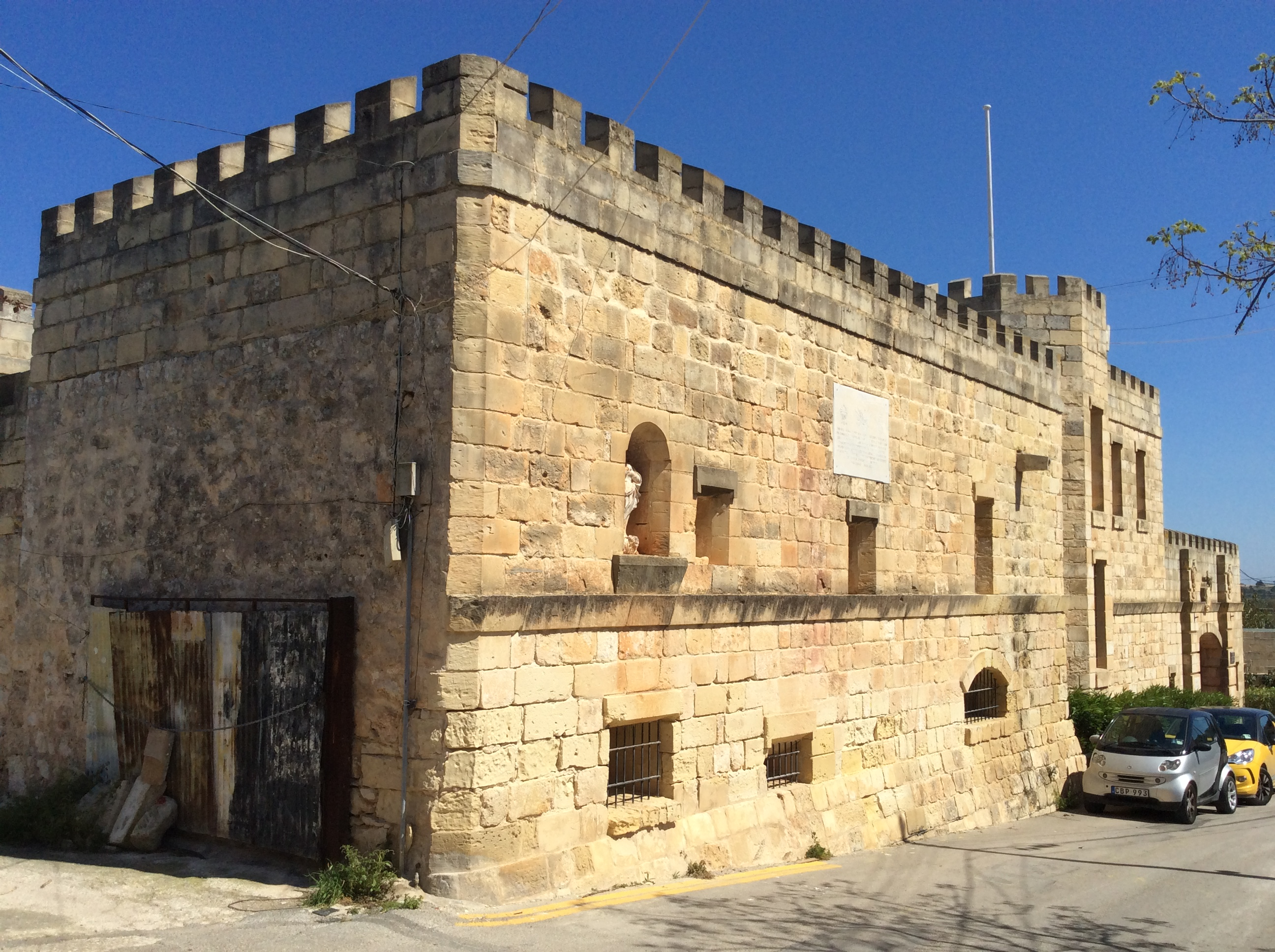
Grand Master Rohan hunting lodge, now the Castello dei Baroni

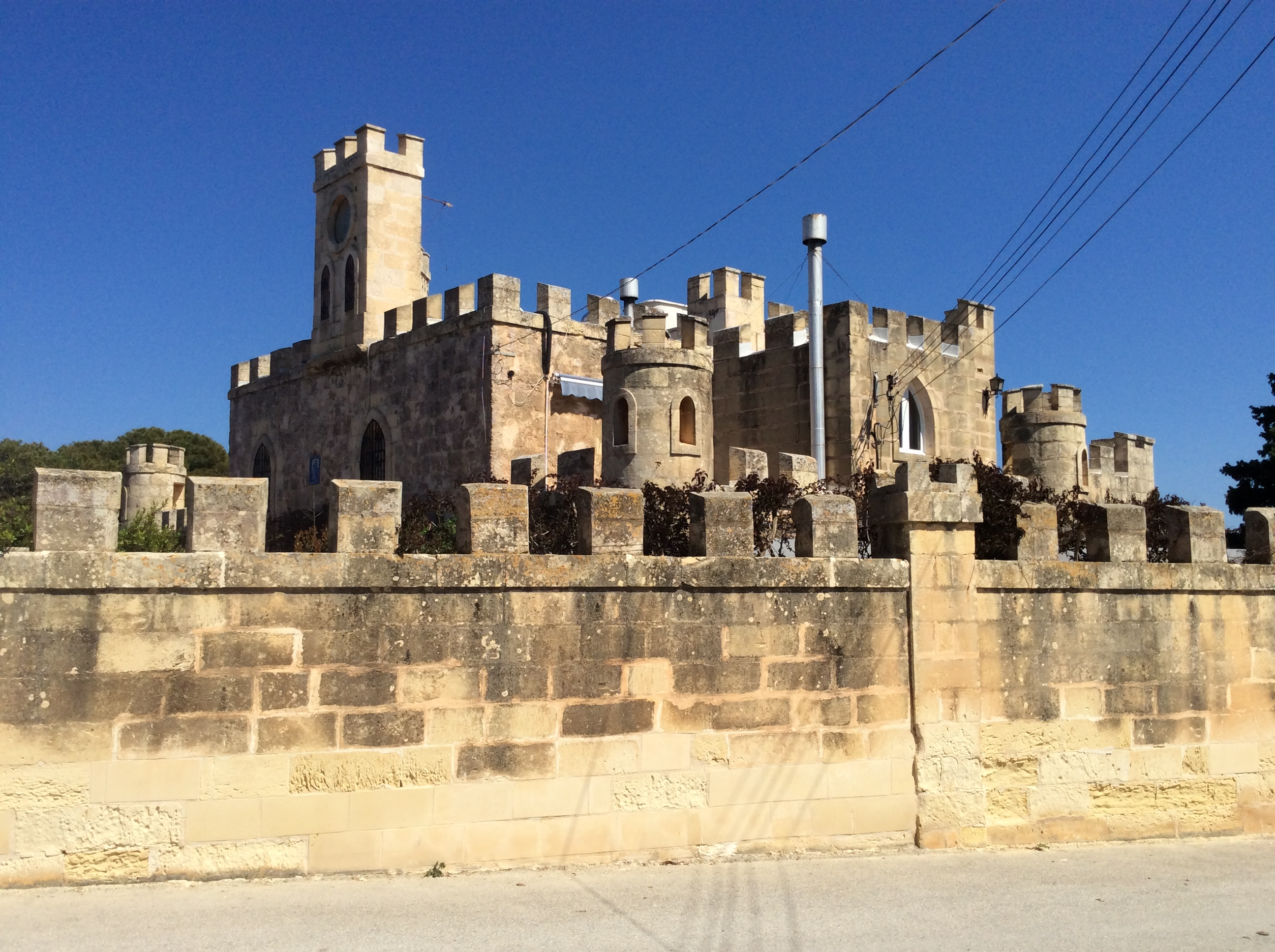
Castel Bertrand

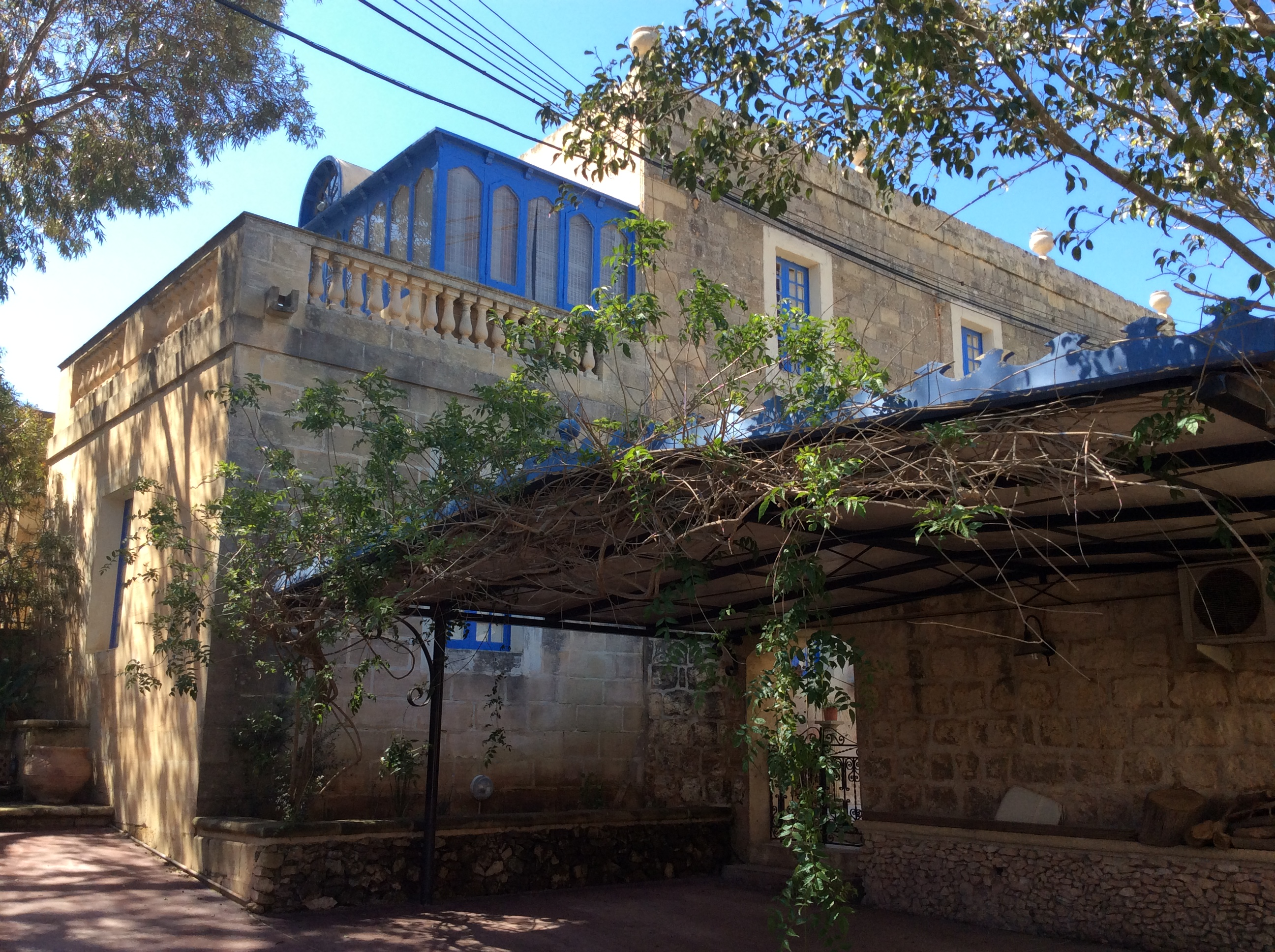
Casa Manduca

- Palazzo Gerxija
- Casino Mifsud
- Casa Navarra
- Casa Manduca
- Is-Sienja, formerly known as Casa Sant Manduca (built 17th century) (Advance Dressing Station)
- Castel Bertrand
- Casa San Antonio, or Palazz tat-Telgha (Uphill Palace)
- Qannotta Castle, or Palazz Qannotta
- Castello tas-Salvatur
- Palazzo Busietta
- Castello Dei Baroni
- Palazz ta' Gerxija
- Palazzo Promotorio
- Dar San Frangisk
- La Verna House
- Villa Rosa Mundi

=== Churches and chapels ===
Wardija has a large concentration of churches and chapels.

- St. George Chapel, Wardija
- Church of Our Lady, or Our Lady of the Abandoned Church
- Immaculate Conception Chapel, Wardija
- Our Lady of Graces, or Tal-Imrieha Chapel
- St. John the Baptist Chapel, Wardija, or Tal-Hereb Chapel
- St. Martin Chapel, Wardija
- St. Nicholas Chapel, Wardija
- St. Simon Chapel, Wardija
- Chapel at Castello dei Baroni
- Chapel with an unknown dedication

=== Other buildings and structures ===
- Rezul Lodge
- Albizia Lodge
- Wild Rose
- Wardija Battery
- Wardija Hilltop Village
- Dar tal-Argentier
- Wardija Resource Centre

== See also ==
- Bidnija
- Buġibba
- Pwales
- Xemxija
- St. Paul's Bay
