= Mario Calleja =

Maltese politician

Mario Calleja (born 6 September 1957) is a Maltese politician from the Labour Party. He has served as mayor of Marsaskala since 2006.

== Biography ==
=== Early life ===
Calleja attended Tarxien primary school and the Savio College church school in Dingli. He worked in tourism for four years and then moved to the United Kingdom for work.

=== Police and hospitality career ===
Calleja returned to Malta from the UK in February 1979 and joined the Malta Police Force, serving as a constable, a sergeant, and from 1987 as inspector. He left as criminal prosecutor in 1992.

After leaving the police, between 1992 and 1996 Calleja worked for four years as assistant general manager of Qawra Palace Hotel.

Calleja also worked as private investigator for insurance brokers, and opened a private security company. He remained a member of the Police Academy Board and taught courses on local government.

=== Political career ===
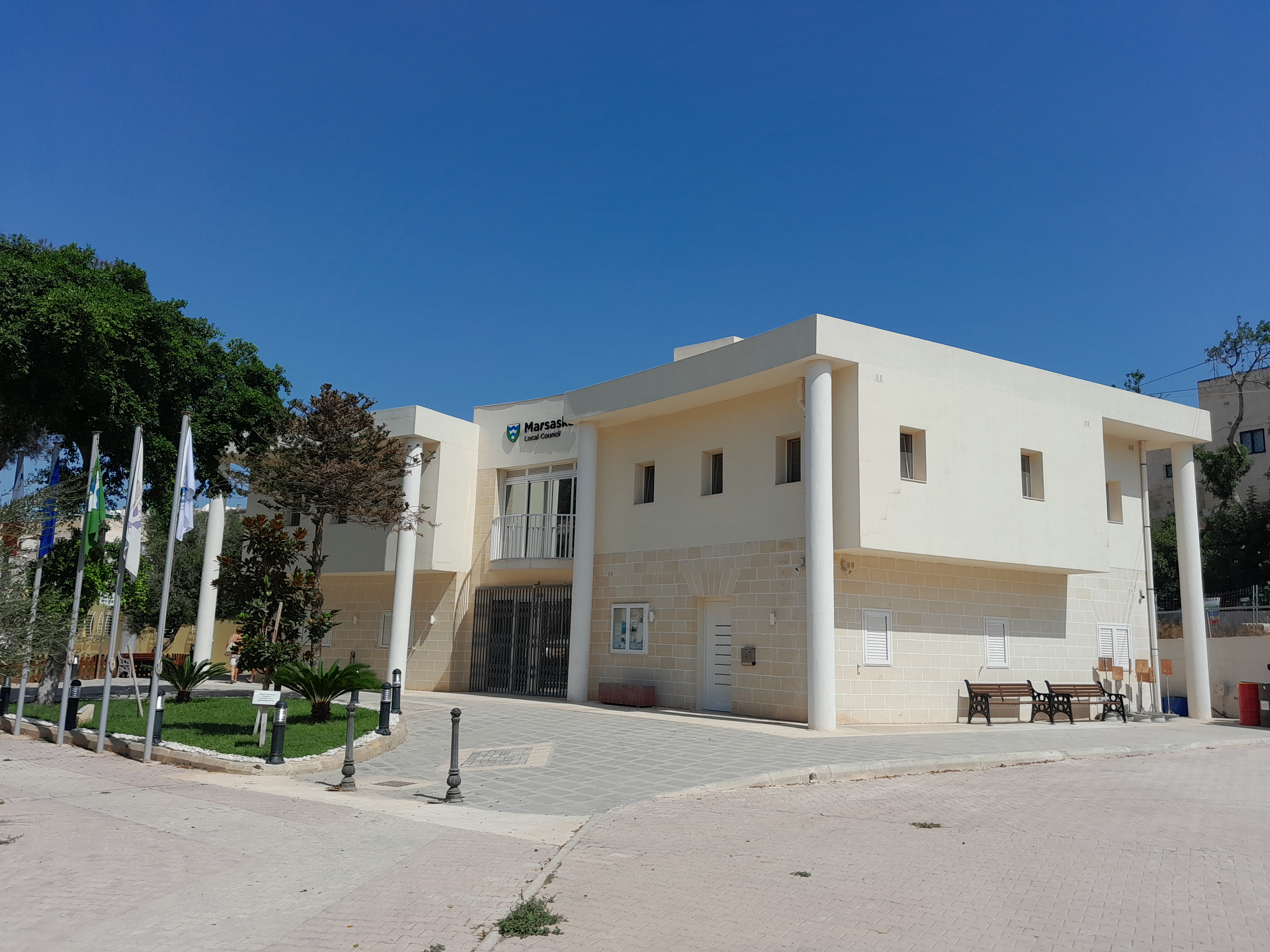
Marsaskala Local Council new building

Calleja was elected for the first time to the Marsaskala local council in 2006 for the Labour Party, with the highest number of preferences, hence being appointed mayor of the locality. He was subsequently re-elected in 2009, 2013, 2019 and 2024.

In 2010, Calleja was appointed for two terms as vicepresident of the Douzelage Town Twinning Organisation.

Calleja also run for the 2013 Maltese general election in the 5th district, without being elected to Parliament.

In 2011, mayor Calleja proposed that new premises for the Local Council would be built within the perimeter of St Anne's Gardens. In 2015, Calleja confirmed that Sadeen group would build it, in exchange for the go-ahead for the American University of Malta campus in Żonqor. This was stigmatised as "institutionalised corruption" by the PN opposition and condemned by environmental NGOs. The Local Governance Board found nothing unethical in it. A final decision was taken in 2017, despite alternative proposals such as the restoration of Villa Mondello.

In 2020, mayor Calleja set up a sub-committee for the regeneration of Marsascala, chaired by Ray Abela, a PL candidate, and including himself together with local businessmen such as Ray's cousin Eric Abela (owner of Ta' Grabiel house), Joseph Farrell (owner of Tiffany Kiosk), and Angele Abela (head of a Minister's secretariat). The sub-committee liaised directly with government agencies including Malta Tourism Authority and Infrastructure Malta, without reporting to the local council or to the residents. Its proposals included pedestrianising the area in front of Ta' Grabiel (soon to become a boutique hotel), and the takeover of the hard shoulder in front of the Parish church (used by boat owners) for bars & restaurants. The sub-committee was dissolved following residents' pressure on the Local Council.

In 2021, the Malta Tourism Authority launched a "regeneration design contest" to increase the tourism attractivity of Marsaskala. The initiative was opposed by both Local Council and residents, who took to the streets to protest overdevelopment without local consultation, considering it a continuation of the previous' years "sub-committee" work.

In 2021, Calleja and the Marsaskala local council joined residents associations in opposing Transport Malta's plan for a yacht marina in Marsaskala Bay. The project was later shelved.

=== Private life ===
Calleja has three children (Janice, Glen and Raffaele) from his first marriage, which was later annulled by the Church. He remarried with Mary Grace Debono in 2016. Their wedding was attended by prime minister Joseph Muscat and former president George Abela.

The couple are members of the Order of St Lazarus of Jerusalem since 2008.

== See also ==
- List of mayors of places in Malta
