= Marsaskala =

Marsaskala Wied il-Għajn Marsascala, M'Skala, M'Scala
- Local council
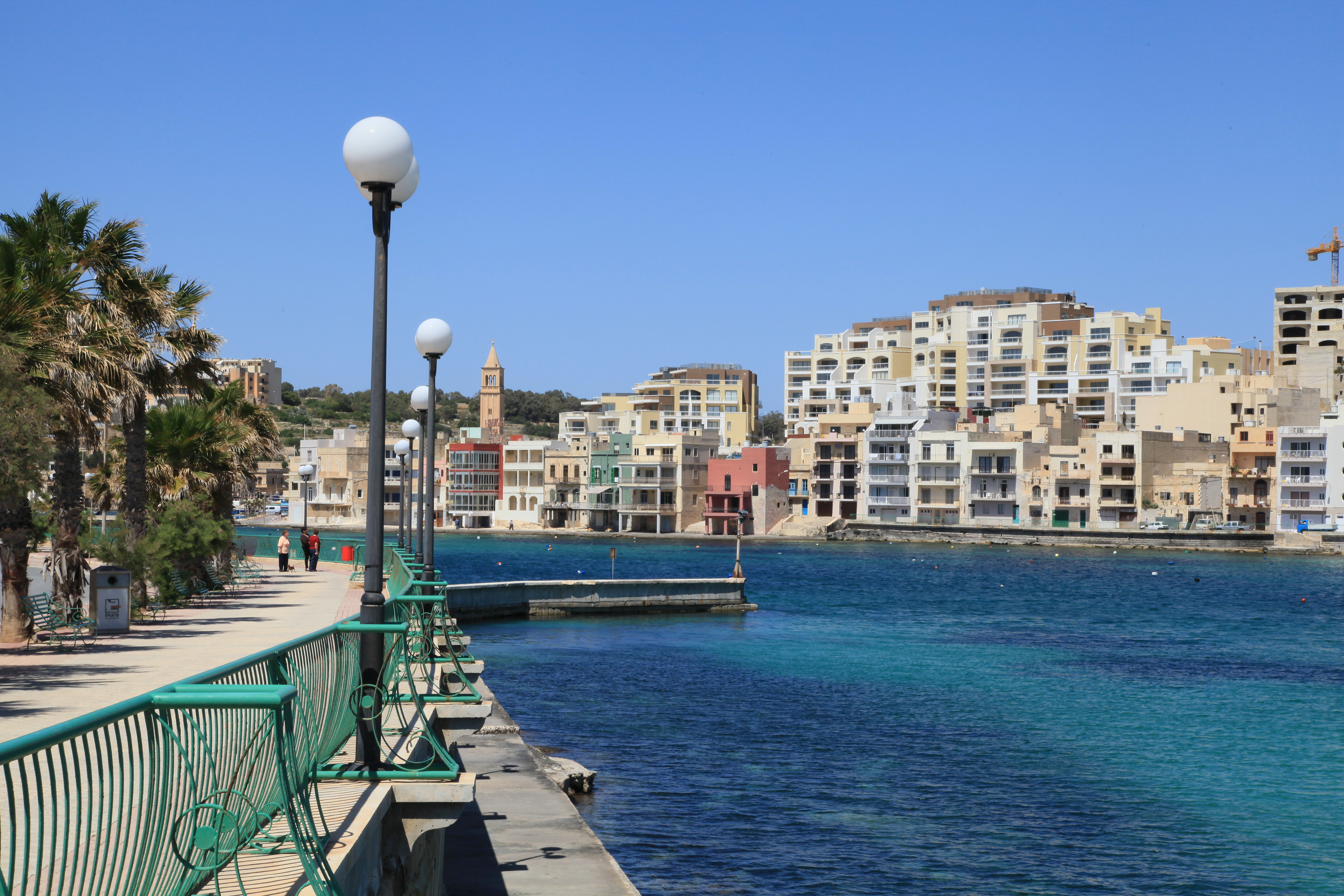
- Marsaskala Bay

- Flag Coat of arms
- Motto: Għajn ta' kenn u mistrieħ
- Coordinates: 35°51′45″N 14°34′3″E
- Country: Malta
- Region: Southern Region
- District: South Eastern District
- Borders: Marsaxlokk, Żabbar, Żejtun

Government
  - Mayor: Mario Calleja (PL)

Area
  - Total: 5.4 km^{2} (2.1 sq mi)

Population (July 2024)
  - Total: 18,317
  - Density: 3,400/km^{2} (8,800/sq mi)
- Demonym: Skali (m) Skalija (f) Skalin (pl)
- Time zone: UTC+1 (CET)
  - Summer (DST): UTC+2 (CEST)
- Postal code: MSK
- Dialing code: 356
- ISO 3166 code: MT-27
- Patron saint: St. Anne
- Day of festa: Last Sunday of July
- Website: Official website

Marsaskala, also known as Wied il-Għajn or Marsascala and abbreviated as M'Skala or M'Scala is a seaside town in the Southern Region of Malta. Originally a fishing village, it has grown into a tourist destination and a permanent hometown for an ever-growing population.

The parish church, built in 1953, is dedicated to Saint Anne and Marsaskala's feast is celebrated at the end of July.

== Name and etymology ==
The name of the town is also written as Marsascala in old orthography, and often abbreviated as M'Skala. It is a composite name derived from Arabic. Marsa (Arabic مرسى) is the common word for harbour (also found in Marsa, Marsaxlokk, Marsamxett). Skala is of harder interpretation, most likely derived from Sqalli (Sicilian), with reference to a community of fishermen from the island, perhaps due to frequent Sicilian maritime activity.

Marsaskala is also known as Wied il-Għajn by the Maltese, as the bay and the old small village are flanked by two valleys, through which a spring of fresh water used to flow down into the innermost bay. Wied means valley and Għajn (pronounced ayn) refers to the spring of fresh water. Literally, Wied il-Għajn (ِArabic: واد العين) means Valley of the Spring.

== History ==
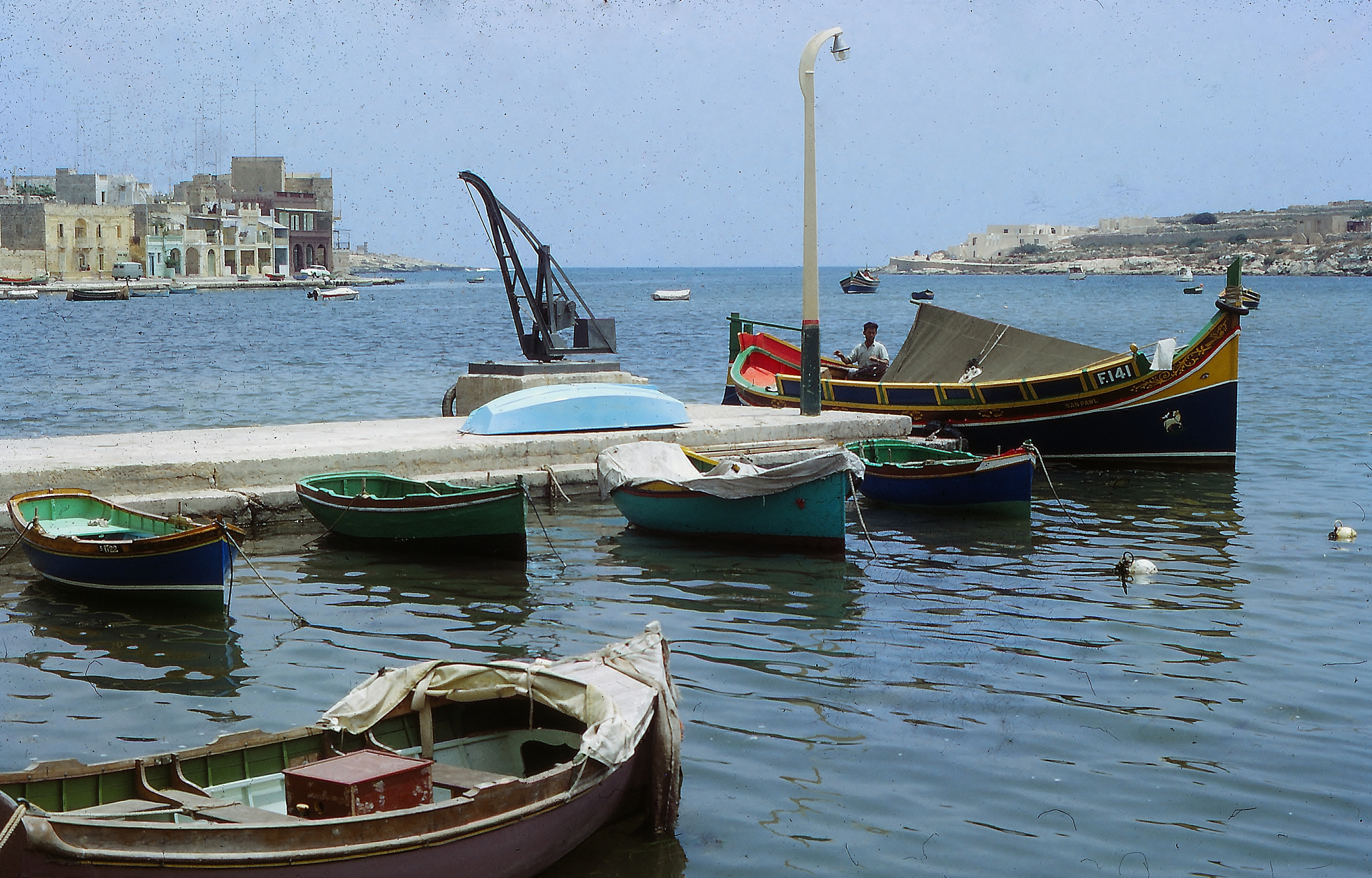
Marsaskala in 1967 - a luzzu draws up to the jetty

Humans have inhabited the area since pre-history, as evidenced by a number of archaeological finds. Some of the ancient remains are the cart-ruts, which are parallel channels formed in the rock.

Early Christian catacombs, as well as Roman remains, were discovered in Marsaskala, the latter suggesting that Marsaskala was also a Roman port. Remains of Roman baths were found in a field at il-Gżira, a rock peninsula behind the Jerma Palace Hotel. Four identical Roman ship anchors were found in the bay during the 1960s, now at the Malta Maritime Museum. In 2003, American amateur pseudo-archaeologist Bob Cornuke claimed that Paul the Apostle had been shipwrecked in St Thomas' Bay, in Marsaskala. This claim was never confirmed and discredited by field experts.

In 1614, 60 Ottoman ships carrying 6,000 soldiers landed at Marsaskala and launched an attack on the south of Malta. Although the battle was a decisive Maltese victory, it brought back fear and terrifying memories of the Great Siege of Malta.

Sea towers were built in the area to reduce vulnerability to seaborne attacks. They include Saint Thomas Tower (1565) and Żonqor Tower (1659, demolished 1915), as well as the Briconet Redoubt (1715). Other towers were built privately by wealthy residents as fortified houses, including Mamo Tower, Tal-Buttar Tower and Tal-Gardiel Tower. In 1882 the British built the Żonqor Battery.

While still a quaint fishermen's village in early 1900, Marsaskala has grown exponentially in the course of the 20th and 21st century into the main urban centre in the south-east region of Malta, and the 8th biggest urban area in Malta. Urbanisation has led to the spread of residential developments, which have taken up the whole peninsula of San Tumas, the Bellavista hillside, and the Zonqor coastline.

The Jerma Palace Hotel was built in 1982 at the tip of Ras il-Gżira, in front of Saint Thomas Tower, owned by Libyan Arab Foreign Investment Company and managed by Corinthia until its closure in March 2007. The redevelopment of its ruins remains an open issue. The latest project by Joseph Portelli envisages two eight-storey blocks with 155 residential units, 258 serviced apartments, a 134-room hotel and a shopping centre. Despite no permit granted, such apartments are already presented for sale.

The Marsaskala Local Council was set up in 1994. The main issue in the first local election was the proposal for a new waste recycling plant and a number of biogas tanks in Sant'Antnin Valley. This development was disputed by a committee composed of seven Labour local councils (including Marsaskala) and eight local non-government organisations.

In March 2017 a fire ripped through the Sant'Antnin waste treatment plant, destroying much of it. Most of the plant was shut down in December 2022. In 2024, plans were launched to turn it into a recreational green park covering 23,800 square meters. The new park would complement the nearby Sant'Antnin Family Park.

In August 2021, Transport Malta in a pre-qualification document suggested that most of Marsaskala Bay would be taken up by pontoons and yacht facilities for a new marina. Four bidders submitted their interest in October. Residents and the local council opposed it, including with public protests. While prime minister Robert Abela announced the project would be shelved, residents called for legal certainty, and asked to remove any reference to a yacht marina from the 2006 local plan for southern Malta. In May 2024 Malta's Planning Authority announced that such policy document would be withdrawn. According to researchers, "the Marsaskala marina plan is an example of how civil society mobilised and actively worked to voice its opposition".

== Geography ==
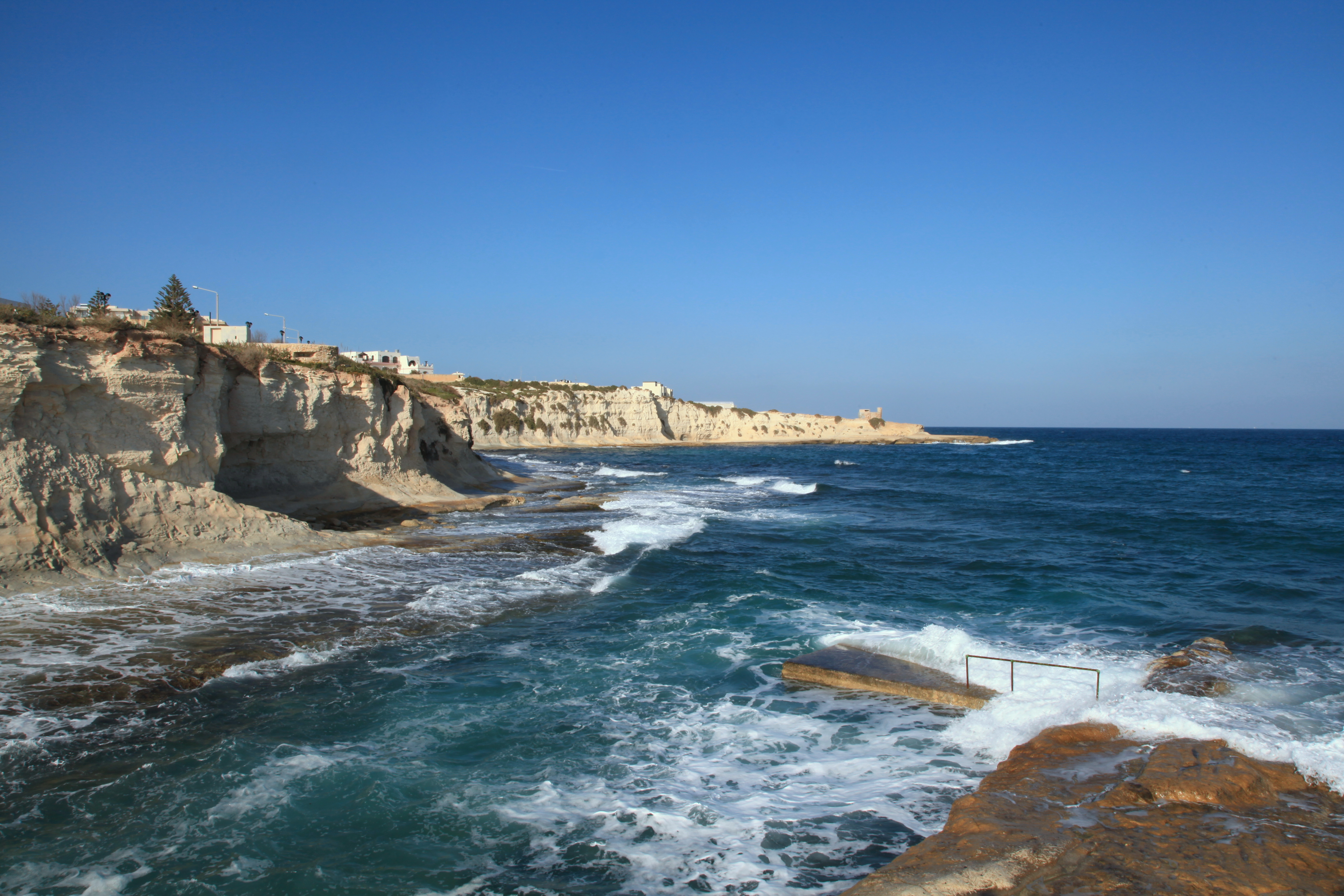
St. Thomas Bay

The town surrounds the Marsaskala Bay or creek, a long narrow inlet which is sheltered to the north by Ras iż-Żonqor, the south-east corner of Malta, and to the south by the headland of Ras il-Gżira.

The town itself is located along both sides of the bay, and across most of Il-Ħamrija, a creek leading to Il-Ponta tal-Gżira. The shore north of Ras iż-Żonqor is of low cliffs, with shelving rock ledges south of the point.

Marsaskala Bay is largely edged by promenade, with low shelving rock ledges cut with salt pans on the seaward face of Ras iċ-Ċerna, which continue on round the eastern point, past l-Abjad iż-Żgħir, and into St Thomas' Bay to the south.

Given the topography, the urban area is separated in several zones:

- The original village was in the area of San Gwakkin - Santa Tereza, on the road to Zabbar. To its the east are today concentrated the Local Council, the Parish Church, the primary school and police station. This urban area continues north of the bay until Zonqor point.
- South-West of the Parish church, the Marina promenade (triq ix-Xatt) is shouldered by a dense area called Bellavista / Wied il-Għajn, which climbs upon the hills.
- Across the salty pond (Il-Maghluq), the hilly peninsula of San Tumas is today fully urbanised and constitutes the main residential and touristic area, with several hotels and beaches.

The urban area is surrounded by countryside. The northern side is today part of Il-Park Nazzjonali tal-Inwadar. In the centre, Il-Maghluq is another natural reserve (Natura2000 site). In the south, San Tumas Bay is surrounded by fields until Munxar Point.

== Demographics ==
Marsaskala has a population of 16,804 people as of the 2021 census, swelling to over 20,000 in summer. The population of Marsaskala was 18,317 in July 2024. This included 9,773 males and 8,544 females; 12,323 Maltese nationals and 5,994 foreign nationals.

While only recorded separate in census data since 1957, the town population has grown exponentially since, almost doubling every decade. Marsaskala is today the biggest urban centre in the south-east region of Malta, and the 8th biggest urban area in Malta.

Its foreign population similarly grew from 4.76% in 2001 (445 over 9,346) to 6.08% in 2011 (672 over 11,059) to 27.65% (4,647 over 16,804).

In terms of religious affiliation, at the 2021 census (table 5.3), the population aged 15 and over of Marsaskala (total 14,253) reported following either Roman Catholicism (11,365), Islam (557), Orthodoxy (682), Hinduism (88), Church of England (274), Protestantism (153), Buddhism (107), Judaism (43), Other religious groups (22) or having no religious affiliation (962).

In terms of racial origin (table 4.3), Marsaskala's population identifies as Caucasian (15,075), Asian (641), Arab (284), African (321), Hispanic or Latino (244), or having more than one racial origin (239).

The average age is of 38.9, lower than the national average of 41.7 and of the regional one of 40.5. Non-Maltese in Marsaskala (35.5) have a lower average age than Maltese (40.2).

== Economy ==
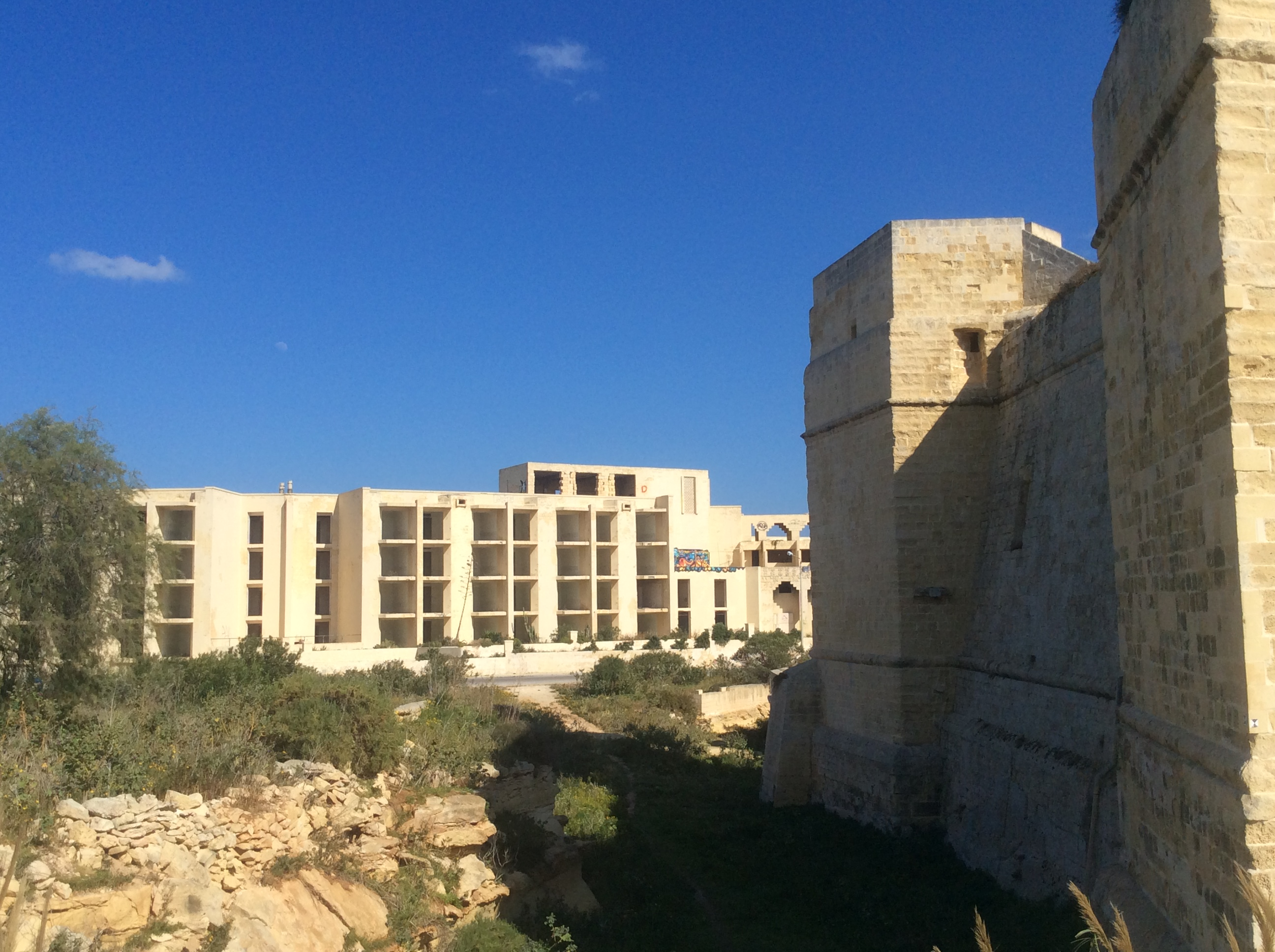
Ruins of the Jerma Palace Hotel with Saint Thomas Tower to the right, as seen in 2016

The traditional activities of Marsaskala are agriculture and fishing. Since independence, tourism has grown in relevance, in particular after the opening of Jerma Palace Hotel in the 1980s.

In the 2000s, Marsaskala has become a residential area for the growing number of Maltese residents, who live in the town and commute for work to other areas of the island, including the nearby airport and freeport.

== Governance ==
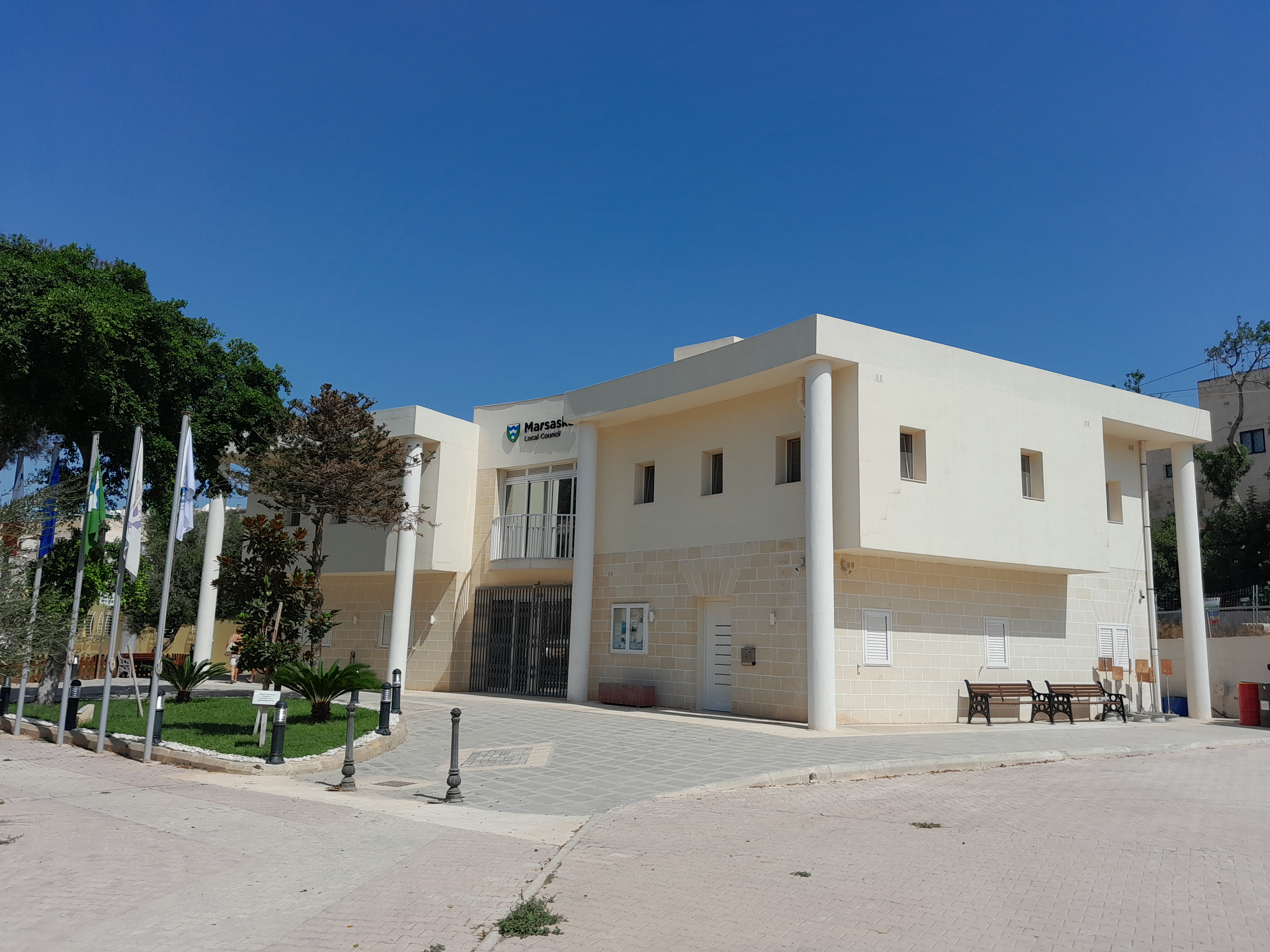
Local Council new building

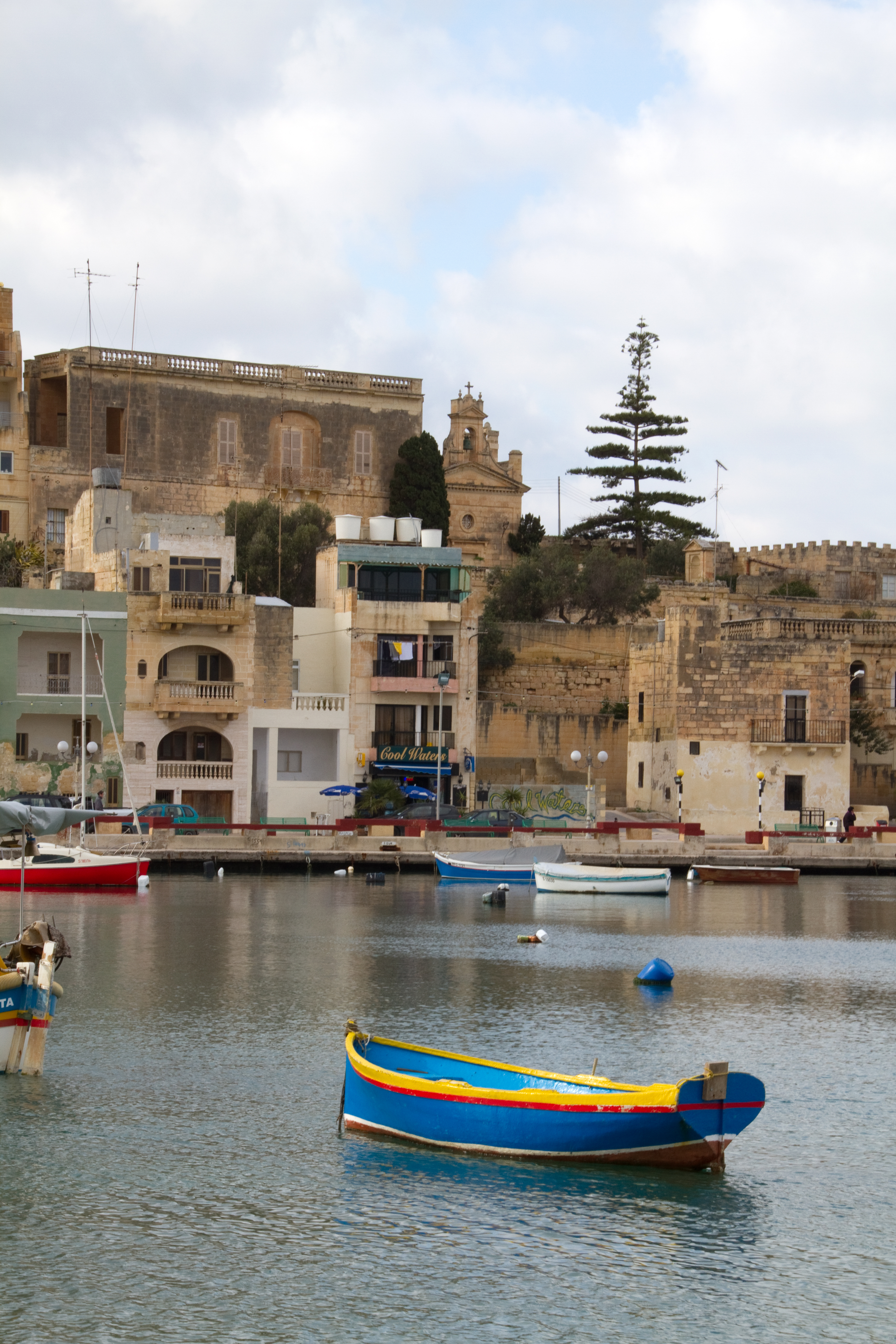
19th century houses, such as 3, Triq ix-Xatt (right), were demolished during the Marsaskala Local Council governance

The first council in Marsaskala was formed in April 1994. The first mayor was also Malta's first female mayor, Marvic Attard Gialanze. She had formed the Marsascala Residents' Association in 1991, and run on the same civic platform. She was succeeded by Charlie Zammit (1997-2000) and Carmelo Mifsud (2000-2006).

Mario Calleja (PL), a former police investigator and hotel manager, has been mayor of Marsaskala since 2006, re-elected in 2009, 2013, 2019 and 2024.

At the 2019 local elections, the Labour Party obtained 69.7% (7 seats) and the Nationalist Party 26.3% (2 seats).

In 2020, mayor Calleja set up a sub-committee for the regeneration of Marsascala, chaired by Ray Abela, a PL candidate, and including the mayor himself together with persons with local business interests such as Ray's cousin Eric Abela (owner of Ta' Grabiel house), Joseph Farrell (owner of Tiffany Kiosk), and Angele Abela (head of a Minister’s secretariat). The sub-committee liaised directly with government agencies including Malta Tourism Authority and Infrastructure Malta, without reporting to the local council or to the residents. Its proposals included pedestrianising the area in front of Ta' Grabiel (soon to become a boutique hotel), and the takeover of the hard shoulder in front of the Parish church (used by boat owners) for bars & restaurants. The sub-committee was dissolved following residents' pressure on the Local Council.

In 2021, the Malta Tourism Authority launched a "regeneration design contest" to increase the tourism attractivity of Marsaskala. The initiative was opposed by both Local Council and residents, who took to the streets to protest over-development without local consultation, considering it a continuation of the previous' years "sub-committee" work.

At the 2024 local elections, the Labour Party obtained 4429 votes (62.57%) and 7 seats, the Nationalist Party 2304 votes (32.55%) and 2 seats, and AD+PD 345 votes (4.87%) and no seats.

Active associations in town include Save Marsaskala and Marsaskala Residents Network.

== Culture ==
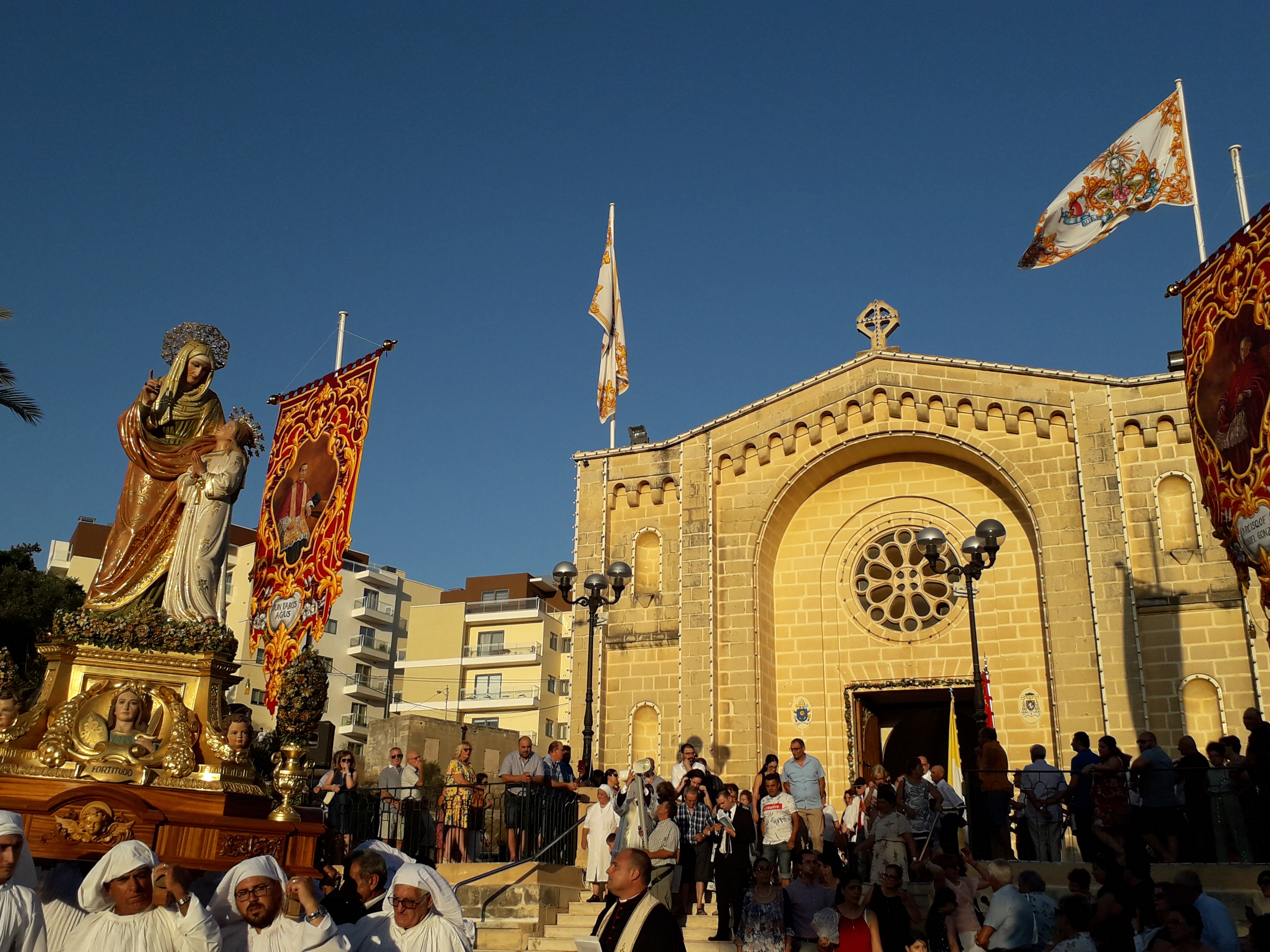
Festa ta' Sant'Anna

The local festa of Sant'Anna is celebrated at the end of July.

Late August sees the events of the Summer Carnaval.

== Landmarks ==
=== Churches ===
Marsaskala's Parish Church, dedicated to St Anne, was built in 1953 close to Casa Monita and to the Briconet Redoubt. It includes a Venetian-style belltower. The smaller, old parish church of St Anne is nearby (triq il-Knisja), surrounded by the houses of the old village. Not far from the parish church, at the start of triq Iz-Zonqor, a private house hosts the small Chapel of Our Lady of the Girdle. On the hill of Bellavista, Villa Apap-Bologna also includes the baroque Chapel of Our Lady of the Rosary, visible from the shoreline.

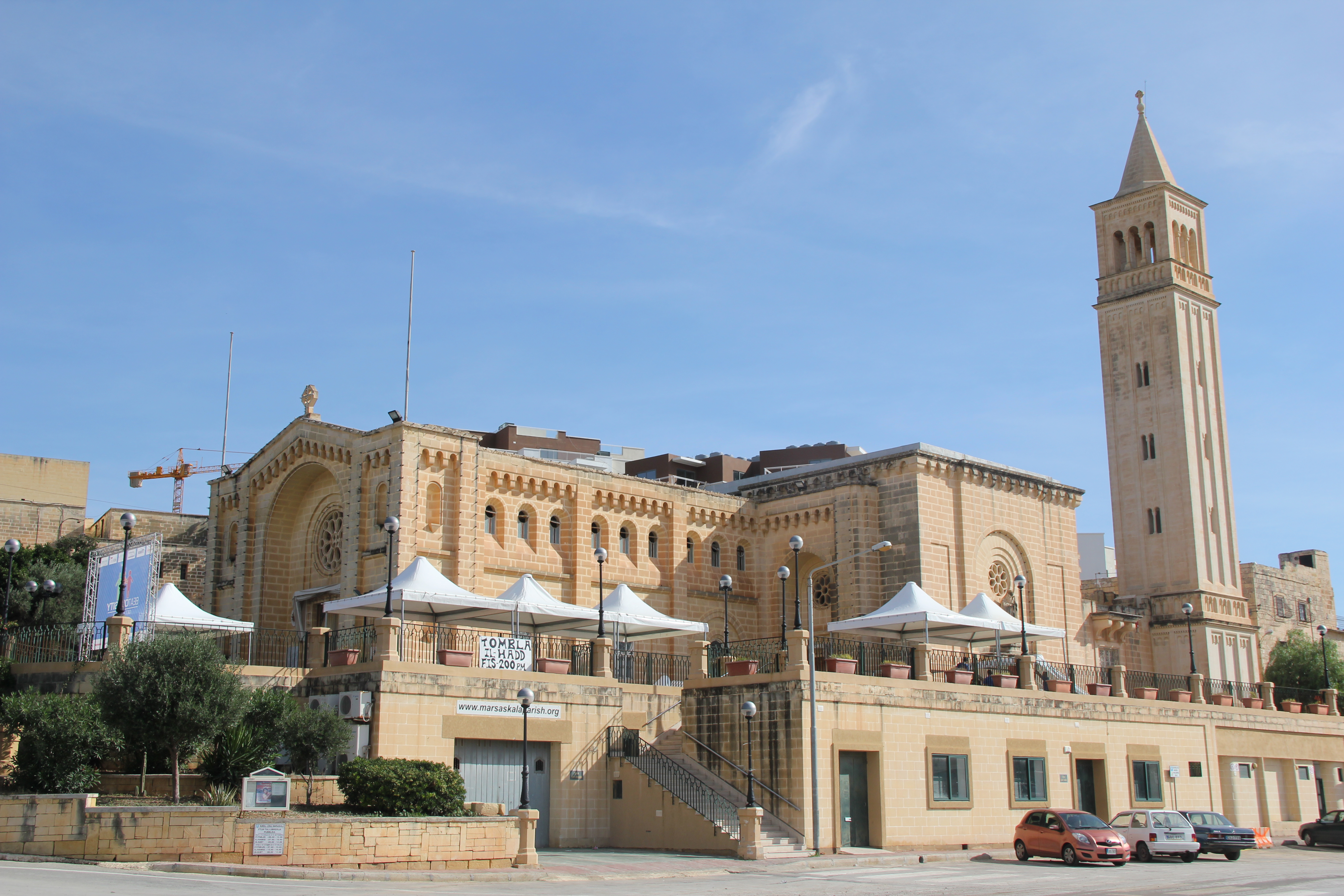
St Anne Parish Church

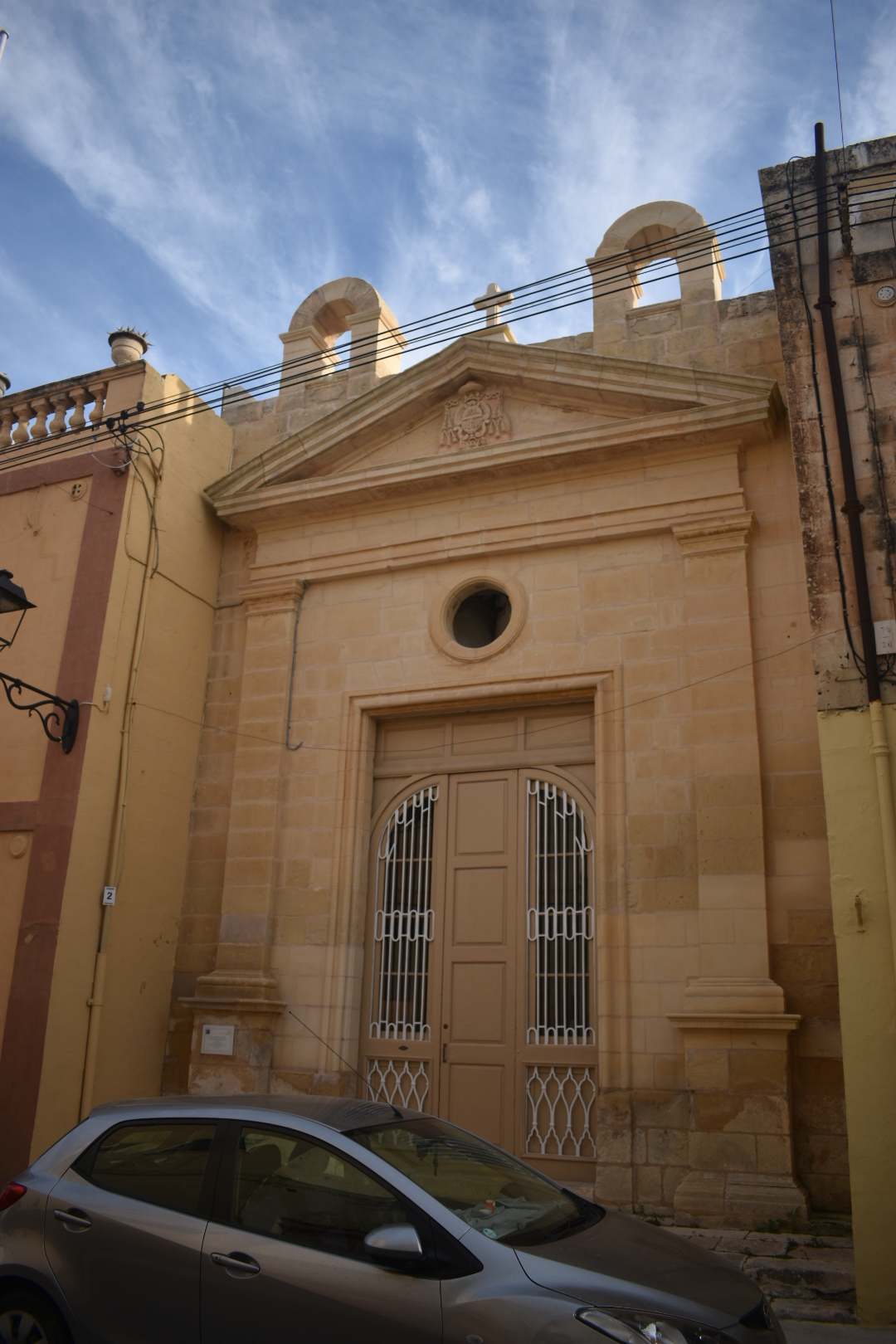
Old parish church of St Anne (triq il-Knisja)

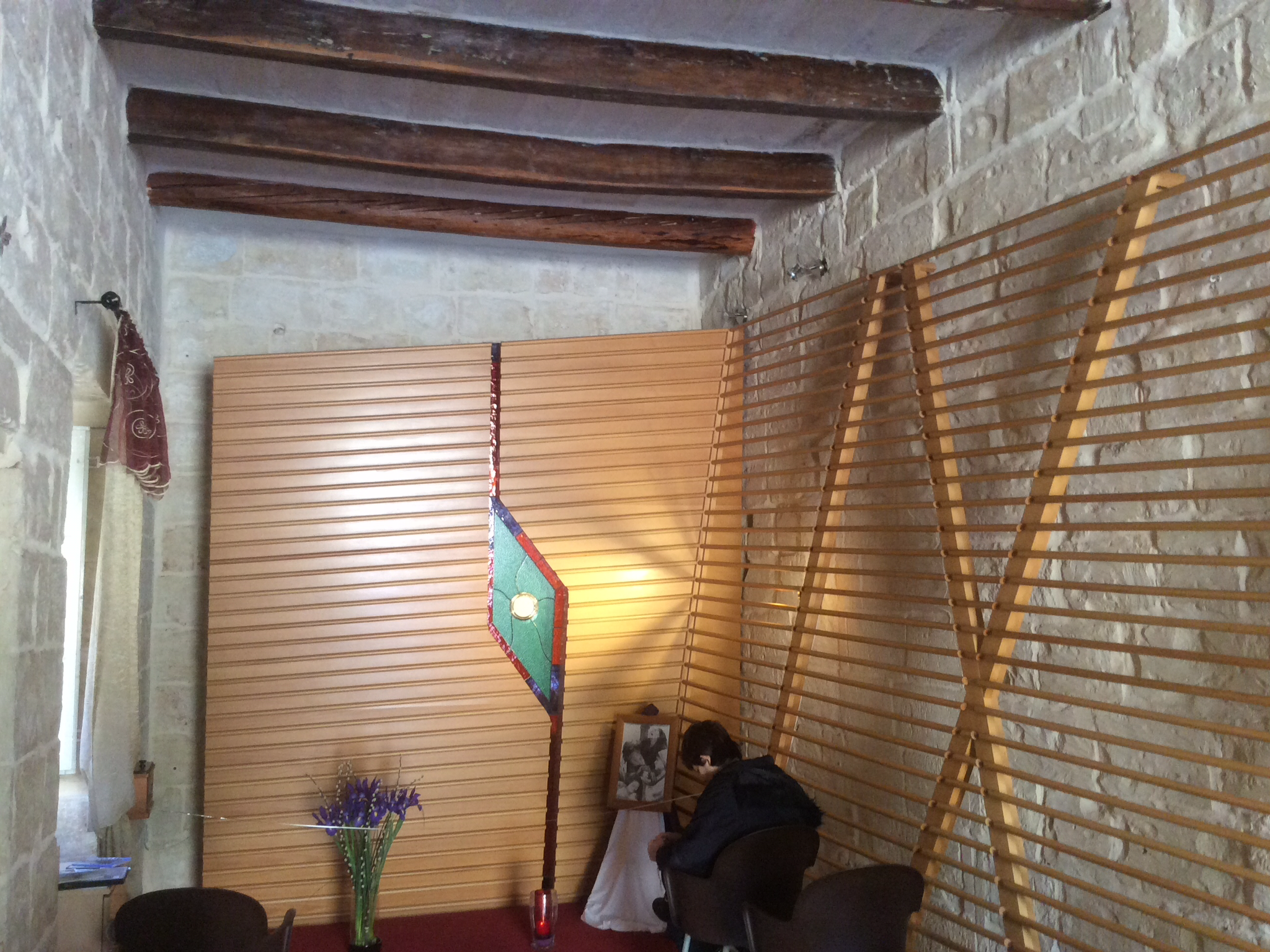
Chapel of Our Lady of the Girdle (triq iz-Zonqor)

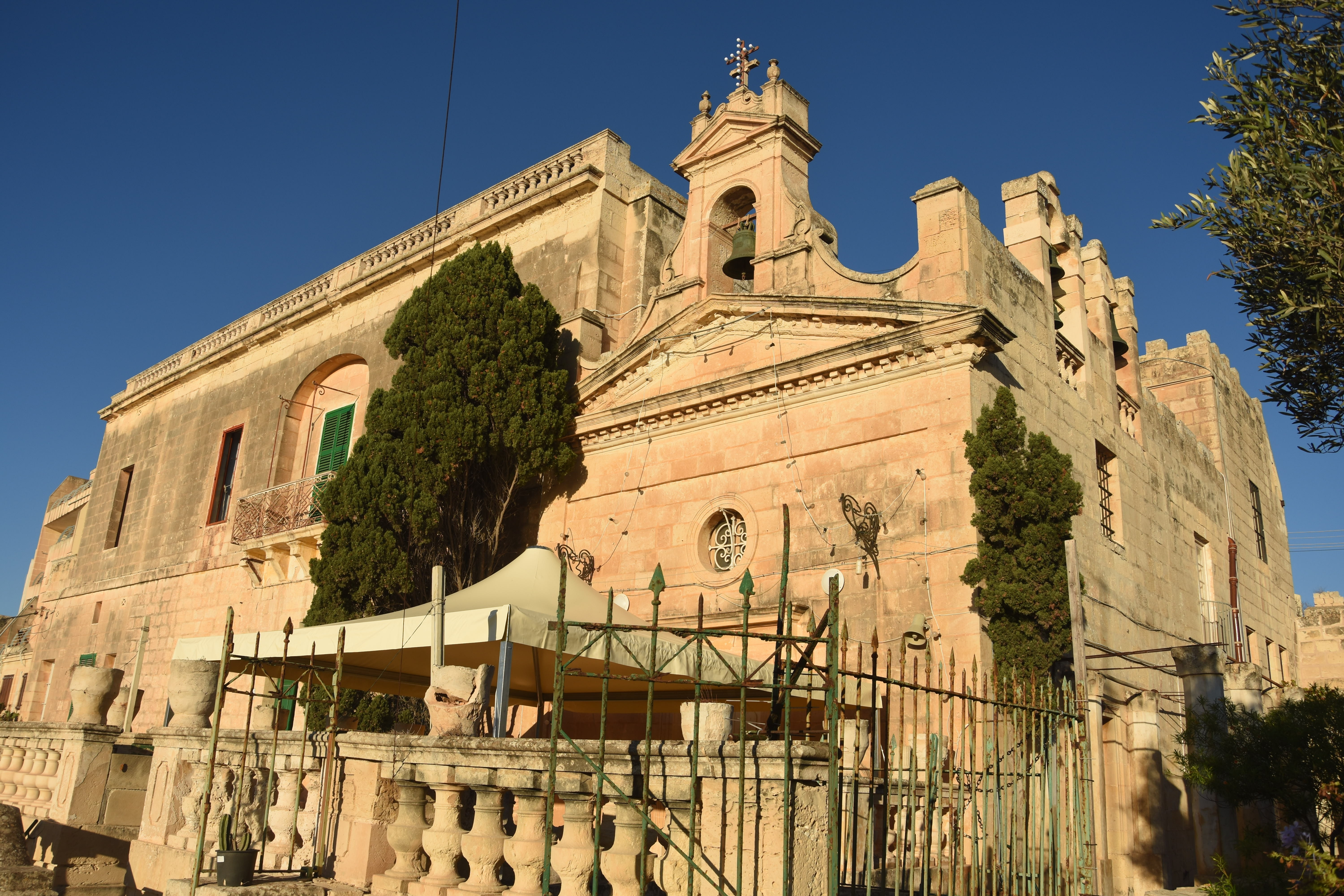
Chapel of Our Lady of the Rosary (Villa Apap Bologna)

Marsaskala's countryside is spotted with chapels, including the ones of St Nicholas (triq il-Blajjiet), of St Gaetan (near Torri Mamo), of St Anthony Of Padua (Triq il-Wied) and of the Madonna Of Light (Triq il-Bidni).

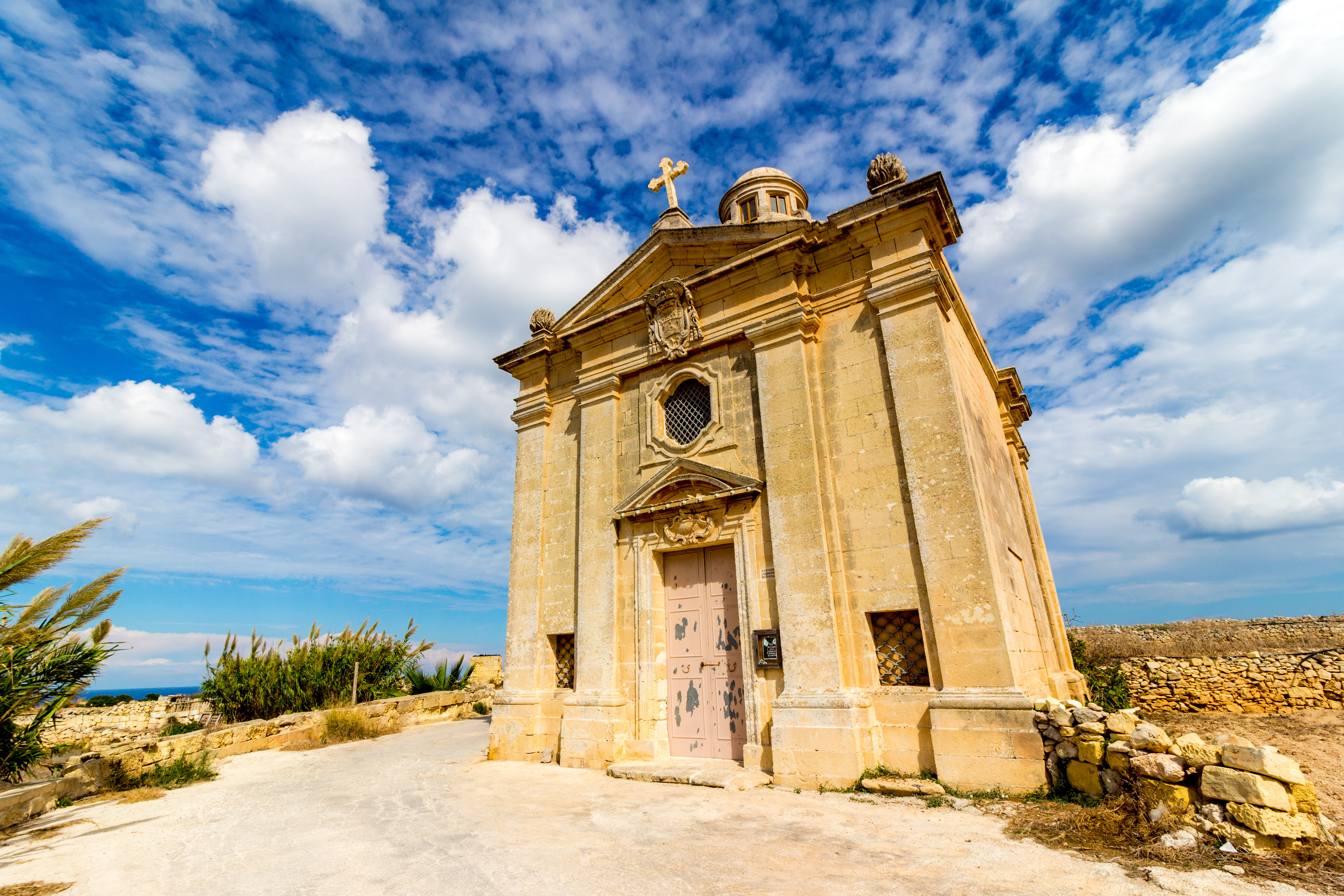
Chapel of St Nicholas

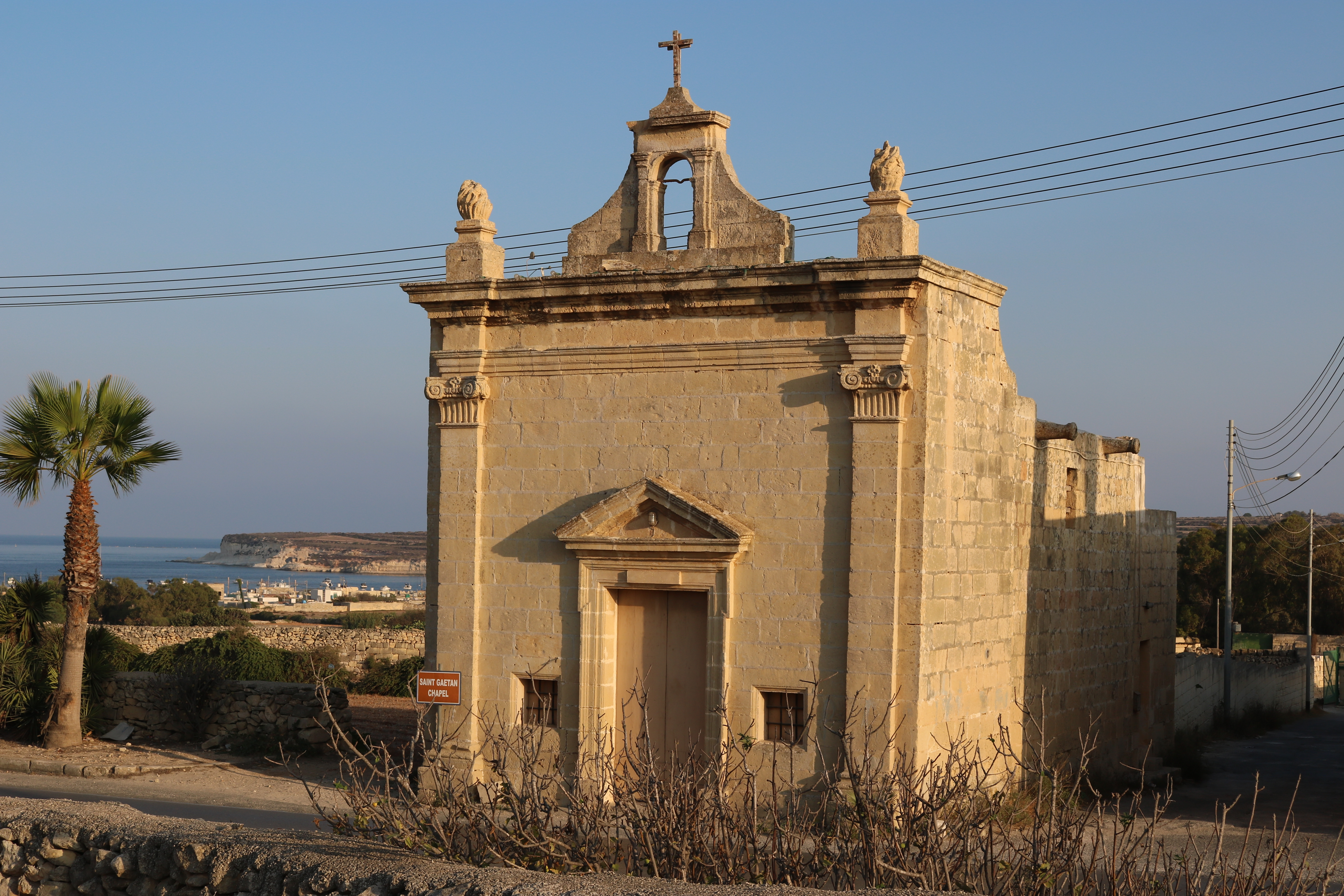
Chapel of St Gaetan (near Torri Mamo)

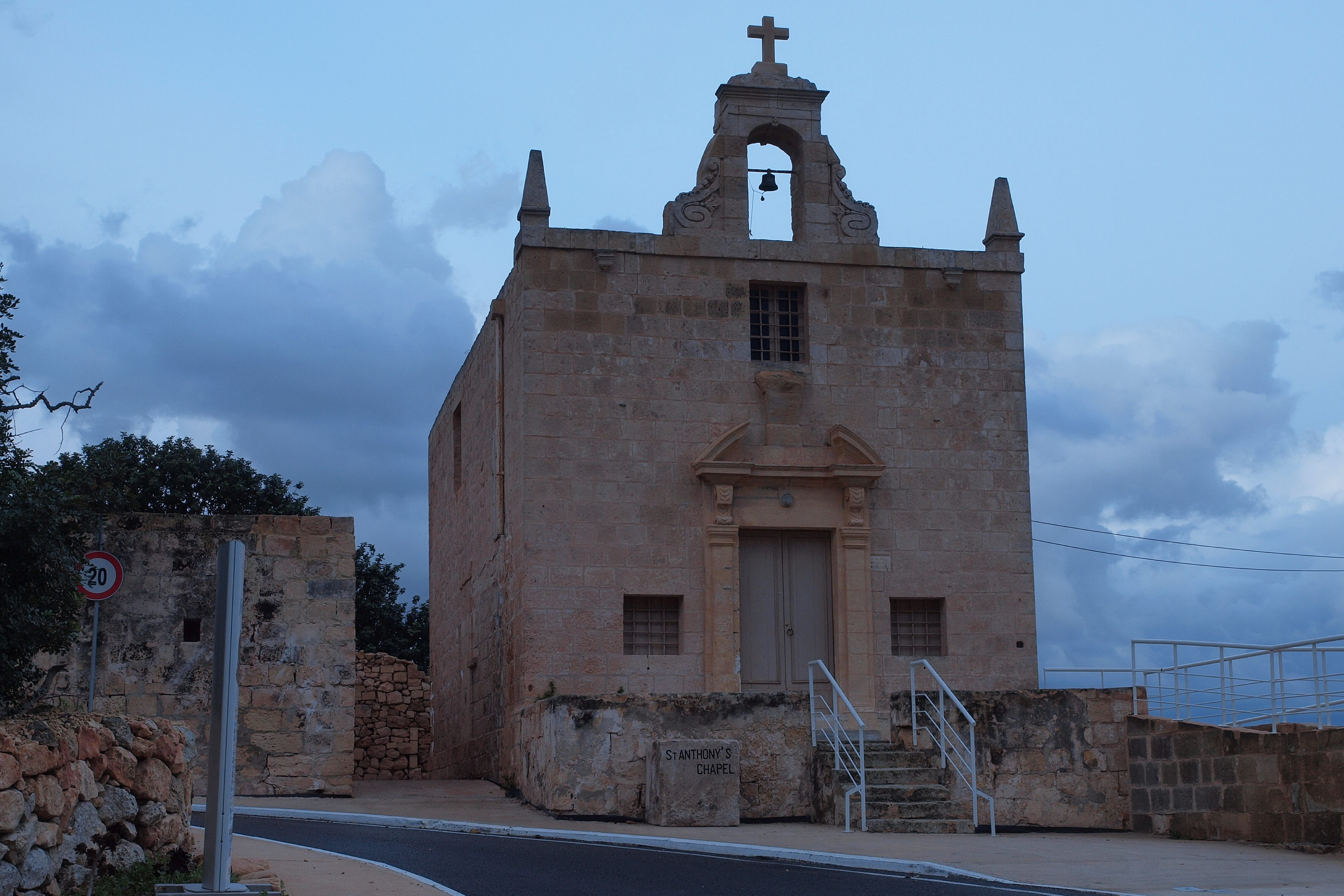
Chapel Of St Anthony Of Padua, Triq il-Wied

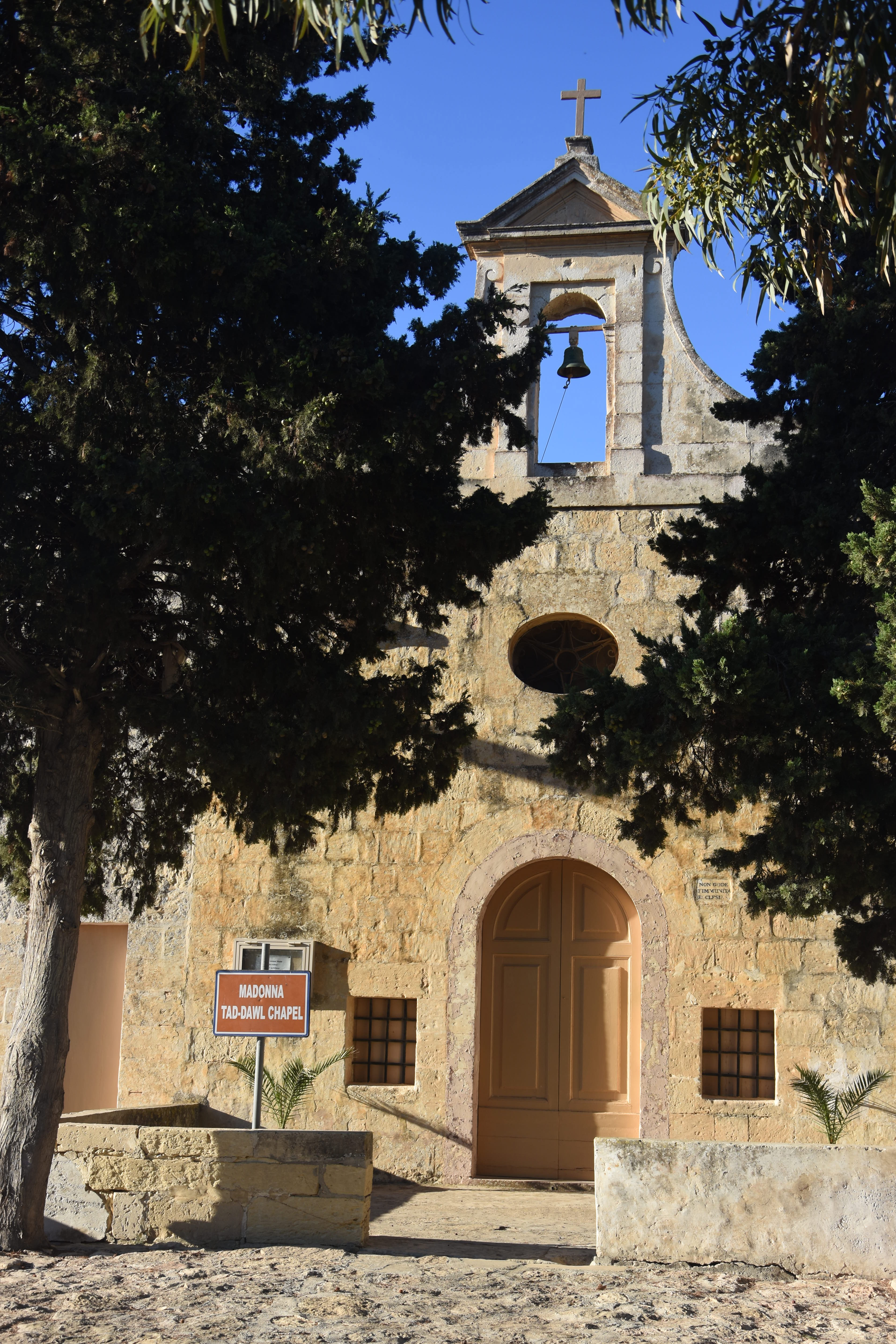
Chapel Of The Madonna Of Light, Triq il-Bidni

=== Civil architecture ===
- Casa Monita: a fortified house located close to the parish church and the Briconet Redoubt, it features musketry loopholes and a rare a muxrabija window.
- Villa Apap Bologna: one of the first three buildings in the village, the villa was founded by the Noble Lwiġi Manduca around 1855 and was occupied by three families including the Apap Bologna and the Formosa Gauci. In 1997 the villa and its Baroque chapel dedicated to Our Lady of the Rosary were donated to the Bishop's Curia to serve as a rest house for elderly priests. It is now managed by the Marsaskala Parish. The "red dining room" was restored in early 2013.
- Villa Mondello: built in 1935 overlooking St Anne's Gardens, Villa Mondello served as Marsaskala's school building until the post-war years. A listed building, and private property it remains in a state of dereliction.
- Ta' Grabiel House: a former family house in Pjazza Dun Tarcis Agius, opening on St Anne's Gardens, this vernacular building retains uniques characteristics. Now owned by Eric Abela, cousin of PL candidate Ray Abela, it is being gutted and transformed into a boutique hotel.
- 3, Triq ix-Xatt: a 19th-century vernacular building on the shoreline, also appearing in the first pictures of the fishing village. It was demolished in 2018 and replaced with a post-modern building hosting a sushi restaurant.
- New Local Council building: in 2011, mayor Mario Calleja (PL) proposed that new premises for the Local Council would be built within the perimeter of St Anne's Gardens. In 2015, Calleja confirmed that Sadeen group would build it, in exchange for the go-ahead for the American University of Malta campus in Zonqor. This was stigmatised as "institutionalised corruption" by the PN opposition and condemned by environmental NGOs. The Local Governance Board found nothing unethical in it. A final decision was taken in 2017, despite alternative proposals such as the restoration of Villa Mondello.
- New Police Station: inaugurated in early 2024, on a plot in front of St Anne's Primary, above the Parish church. The new building cost 700,000 euro.
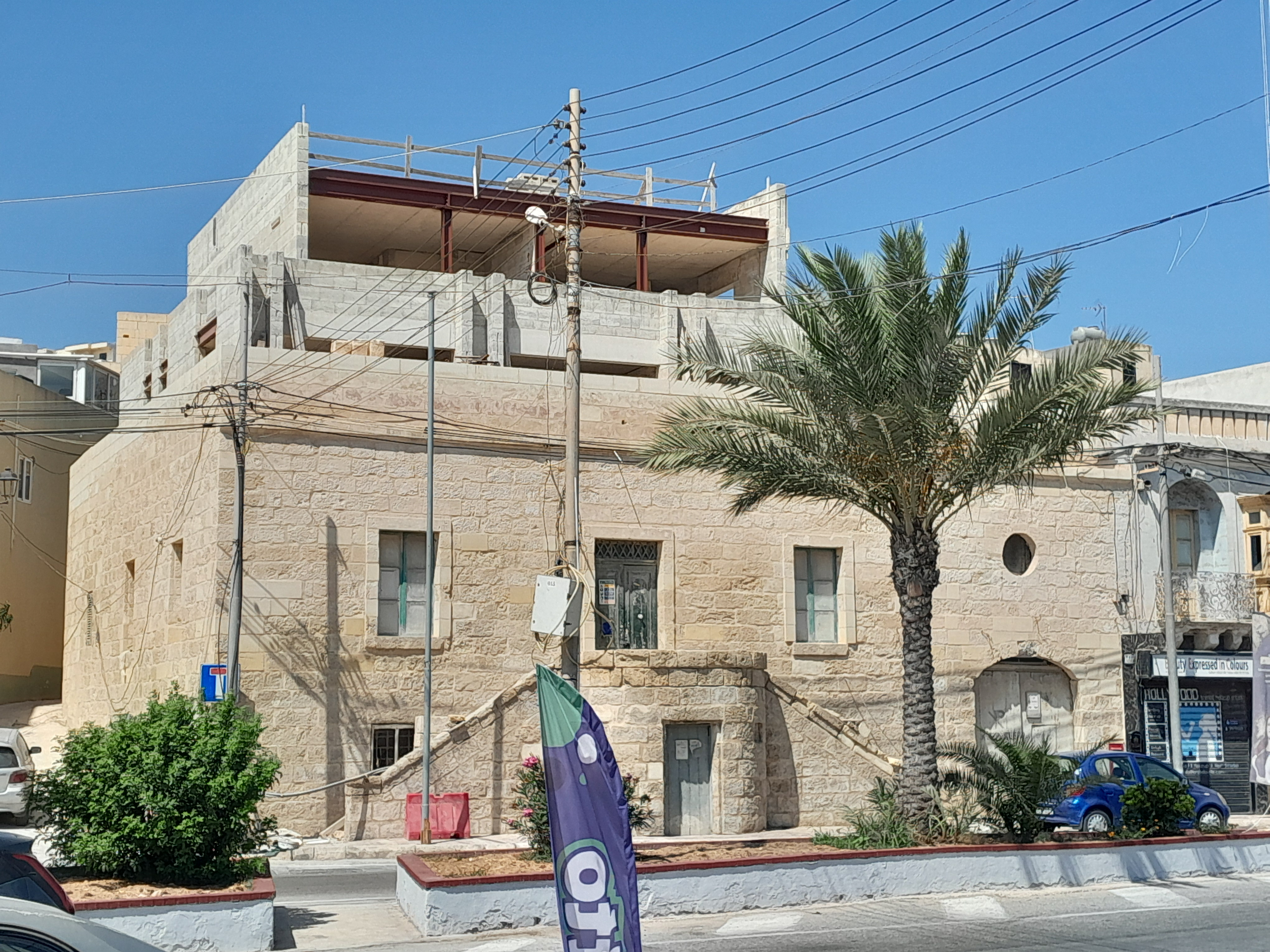
Ta' Grabiel

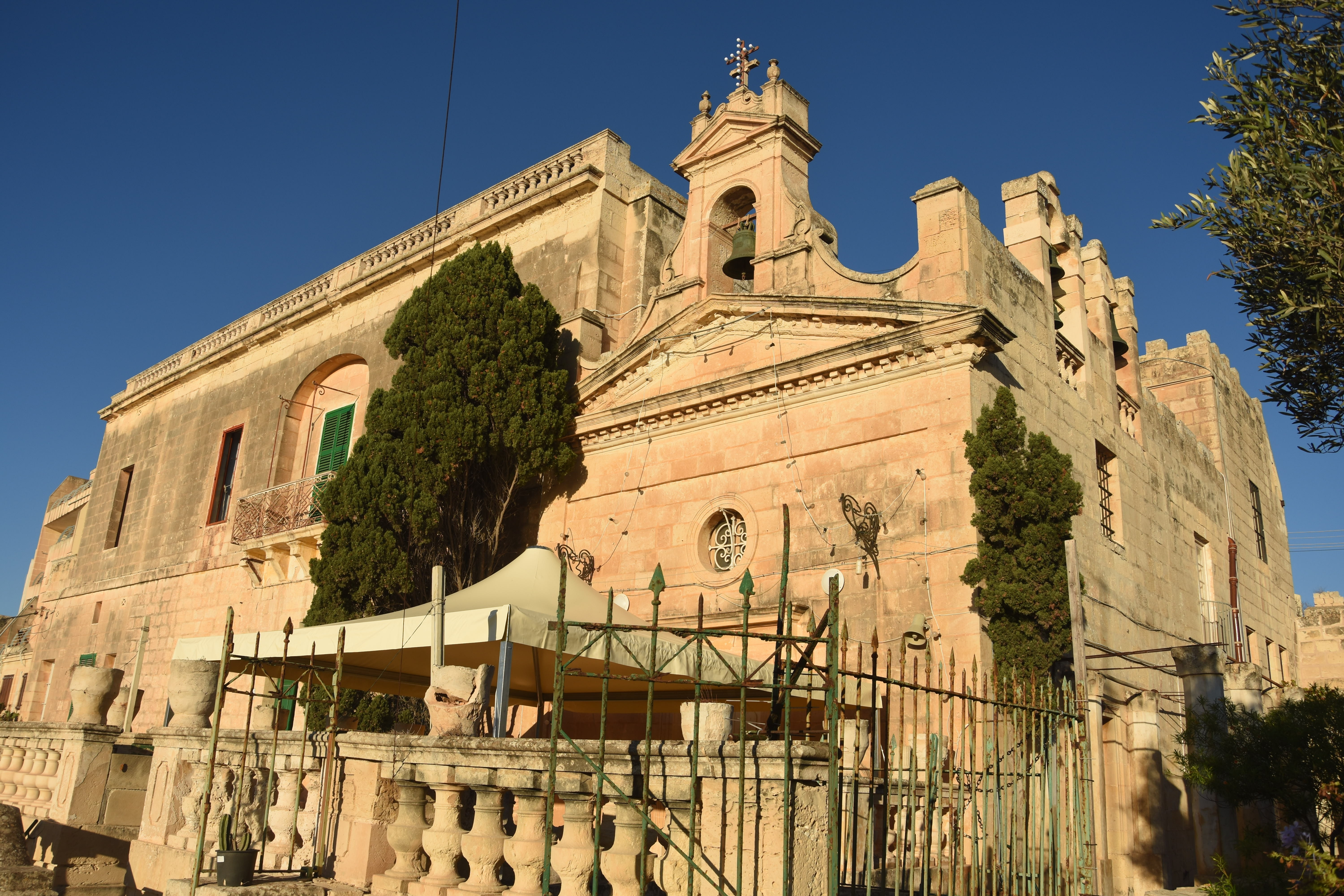
Villa Apap Bologna

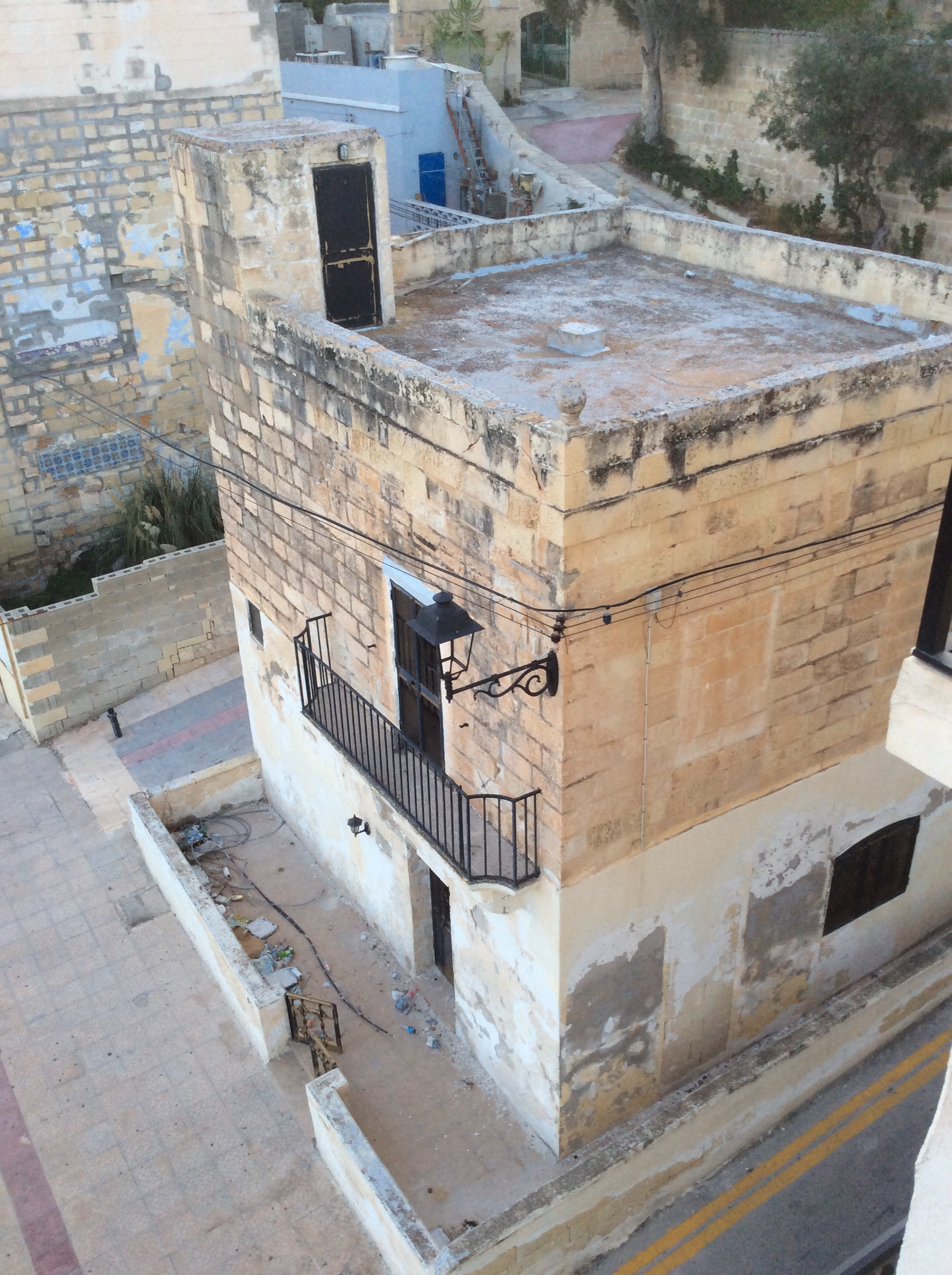
The house at 3, Triq ix-Xatt before demolition (2017)

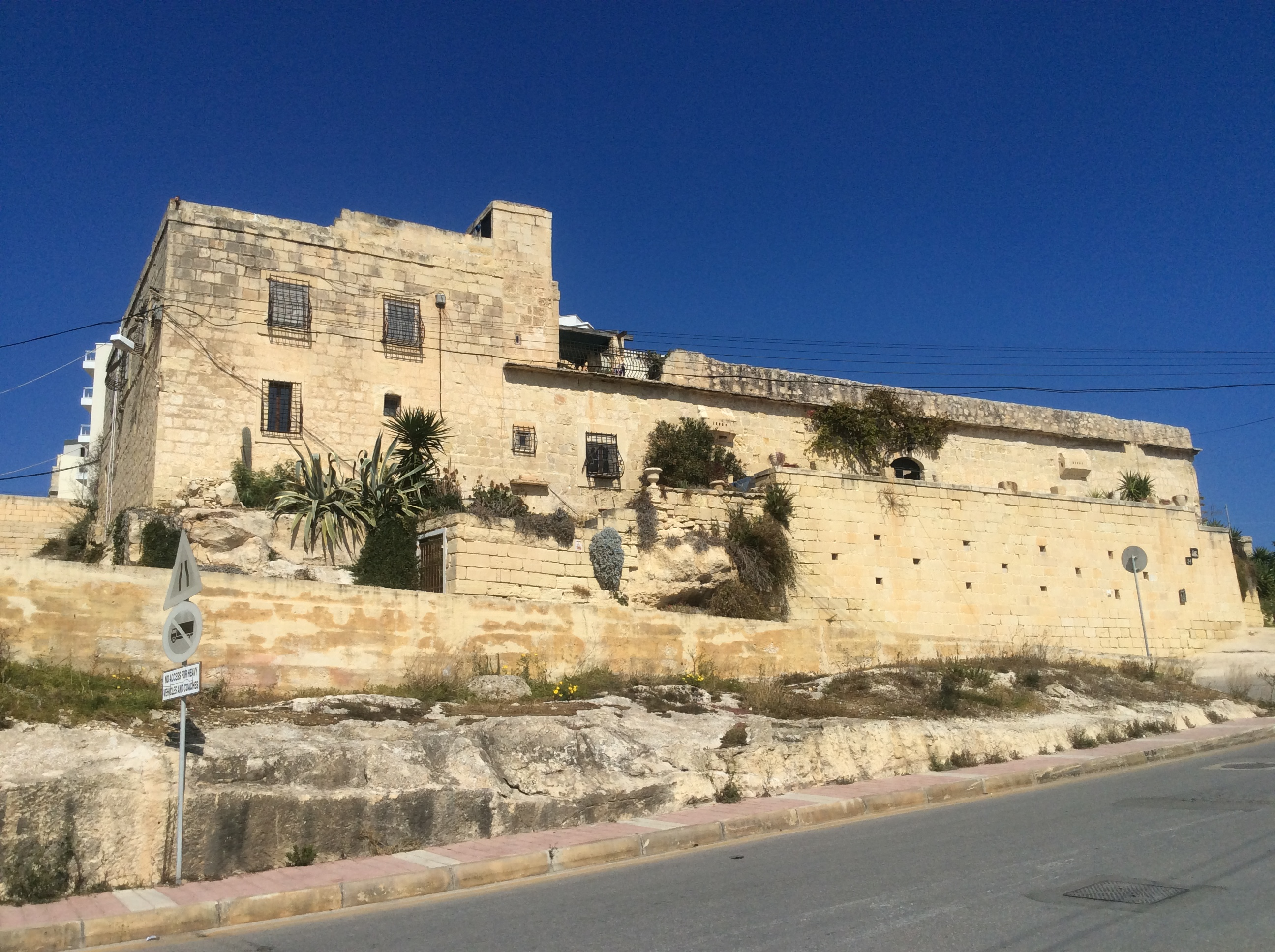
Casa Monita, close to the parish church and Briconet Redoubt

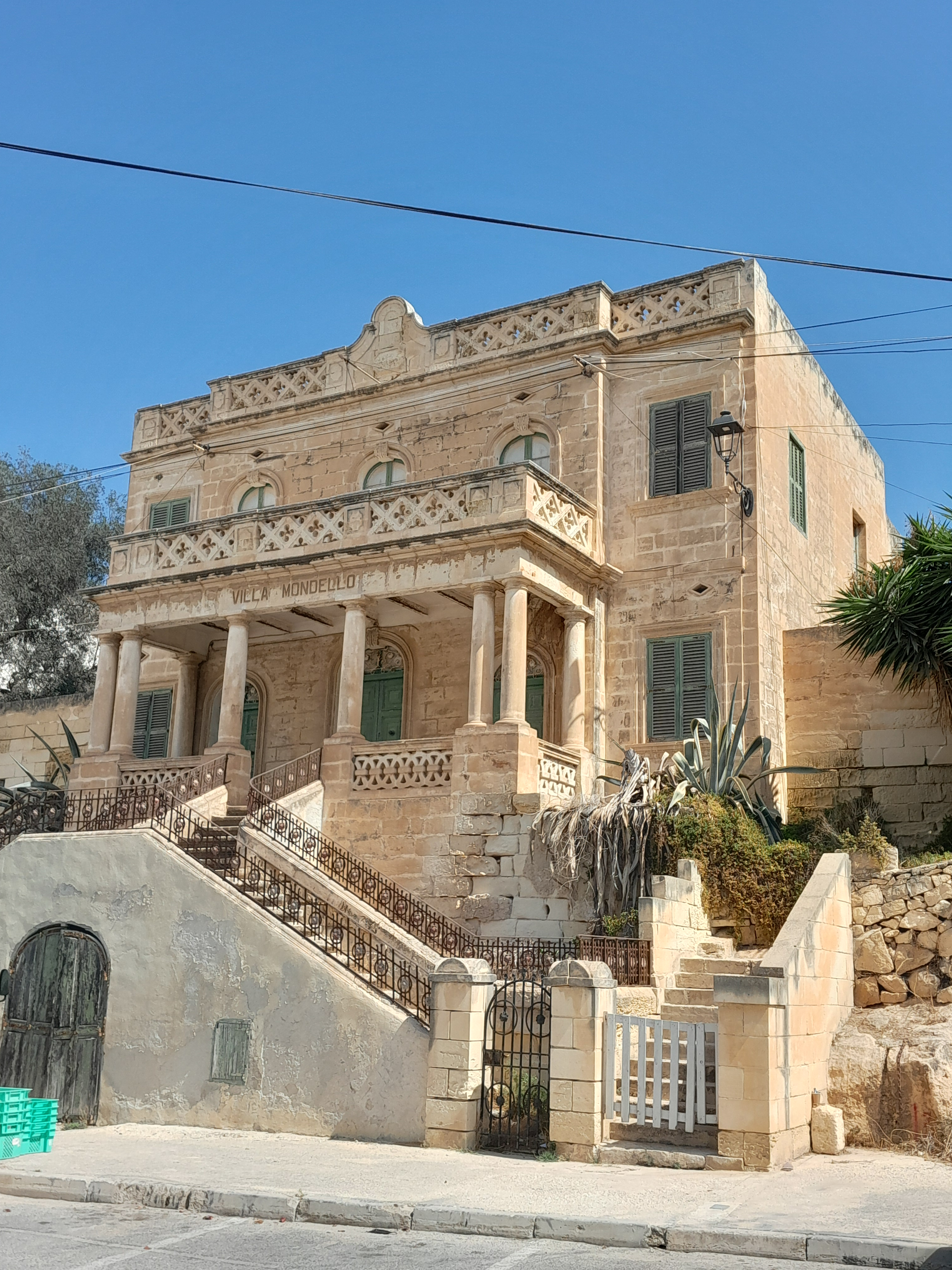
Villa Mondello

=== Defensive architecture ===
In the 16th and 17th century, the Order started to build a series of defensive architectures coast to reduce Malta's vulnerability to seaborne attacks. Saint Thomas Tower was built in late 1565 as part of the Wignacourt towers and kept being used for military purposes into the British period. It has been recently restored.

Żonqor Tower, one of the 13 De Redin towers, was builtin in 1659 and demolished in 1915 by British military engineers. No traces of it can be seen anymore and a pillbox now stands in its place. In 1882, the British built in the area the Żonqor Battery, which saw little use as it was unsuitable for proper defence.

In 1715, the Briconet Redoubt was built by the Order. It has lon been used as a police station. A second redoubt was built close to Marsaskala but was destroyed in 1915.

Other towers were built privately by wealthy residents as fortified houses, including Mamo Tower, Tal-Buttar Tower and Tal-Gardiel Tower.

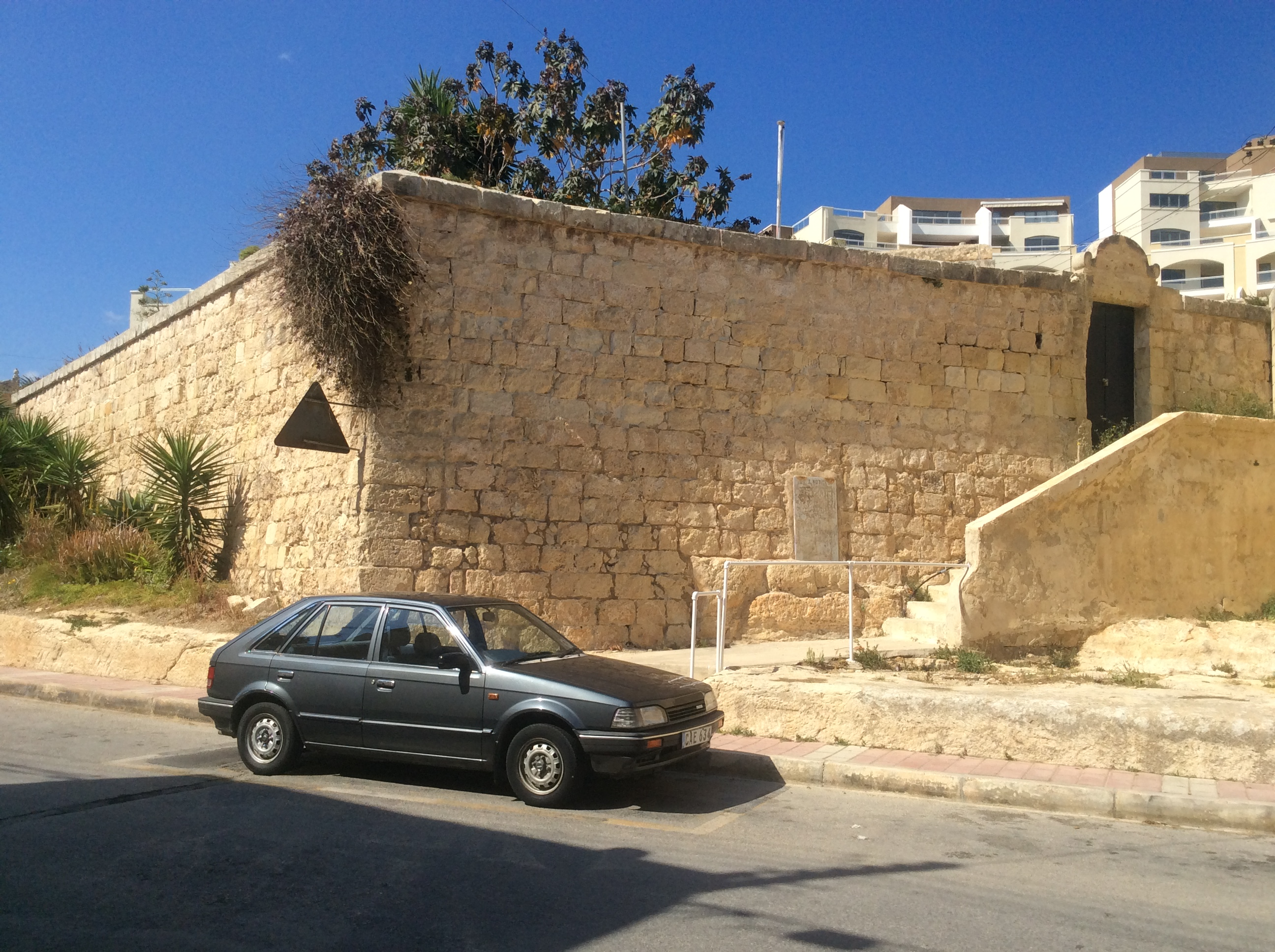
Briconet Redoubt

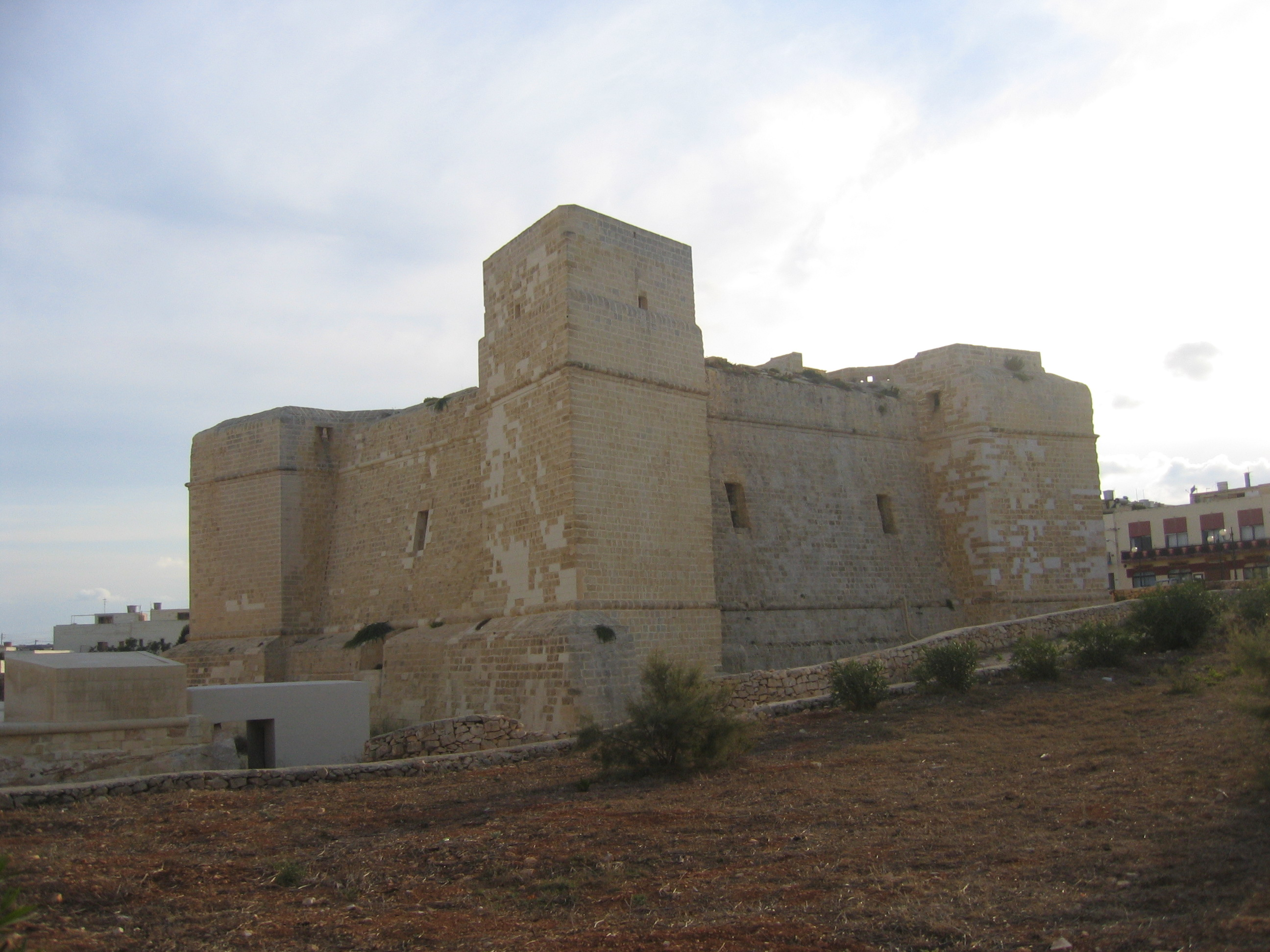
Saint Thomas Tower

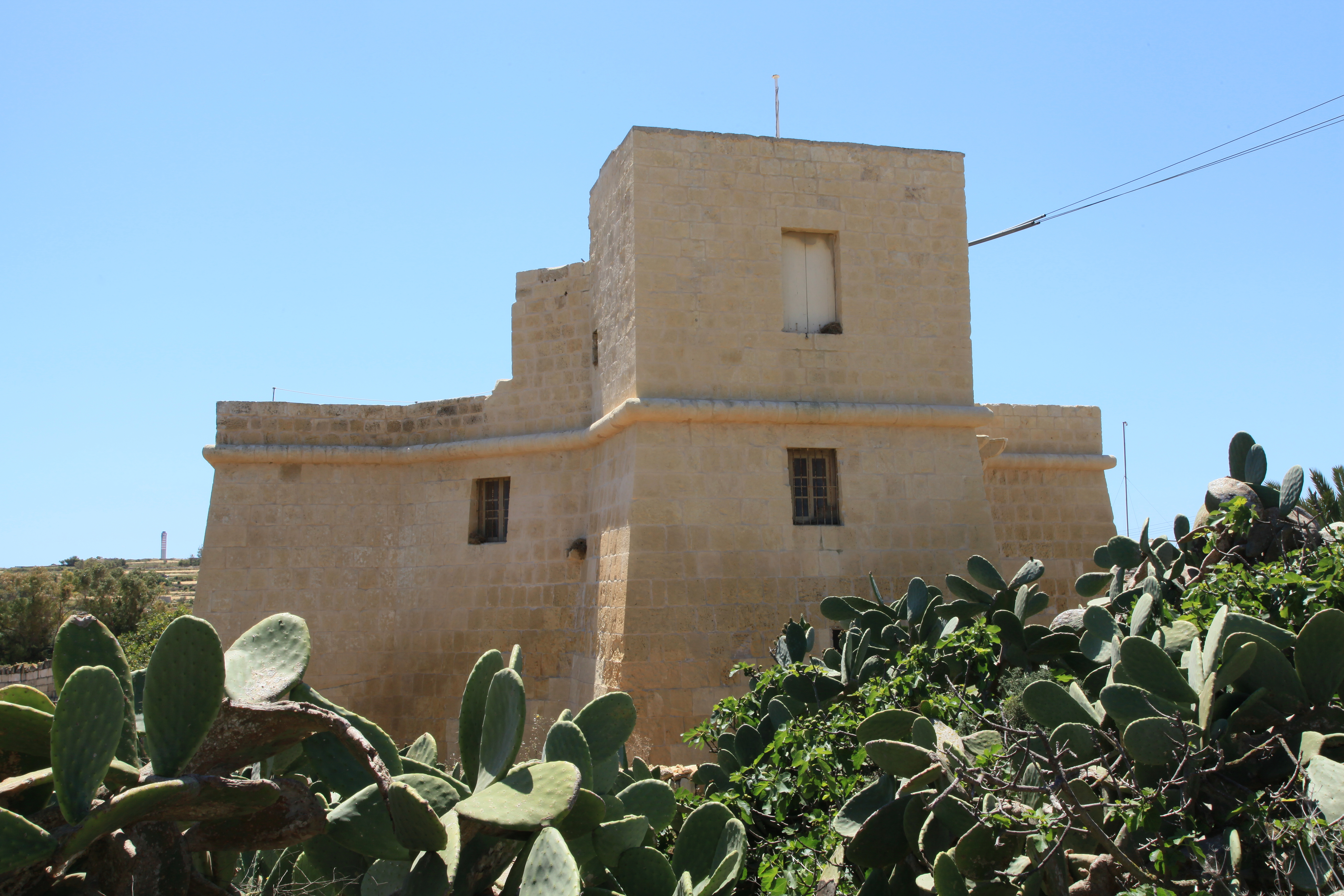
Torri Mamo

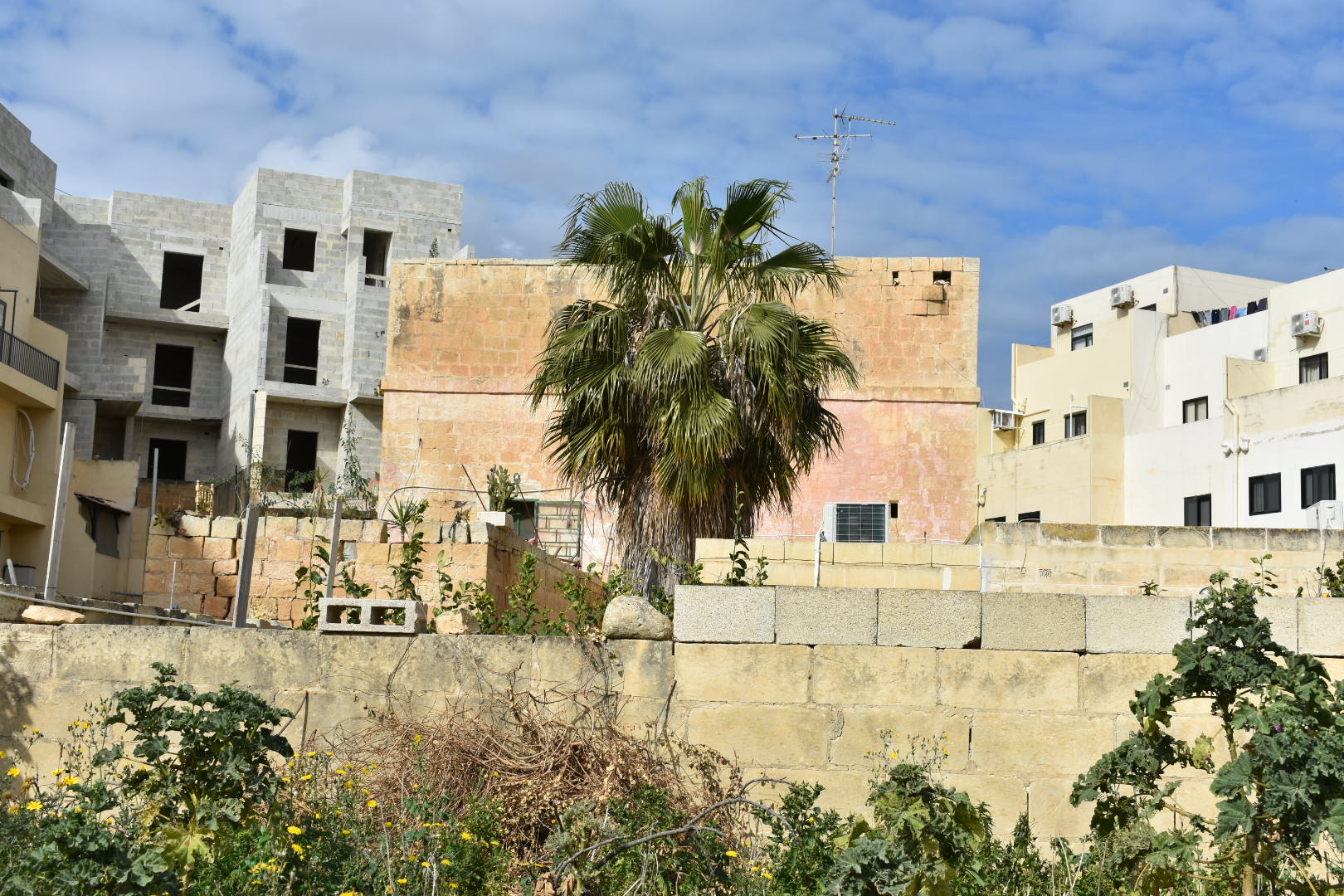
Torri Tal-Gardiel

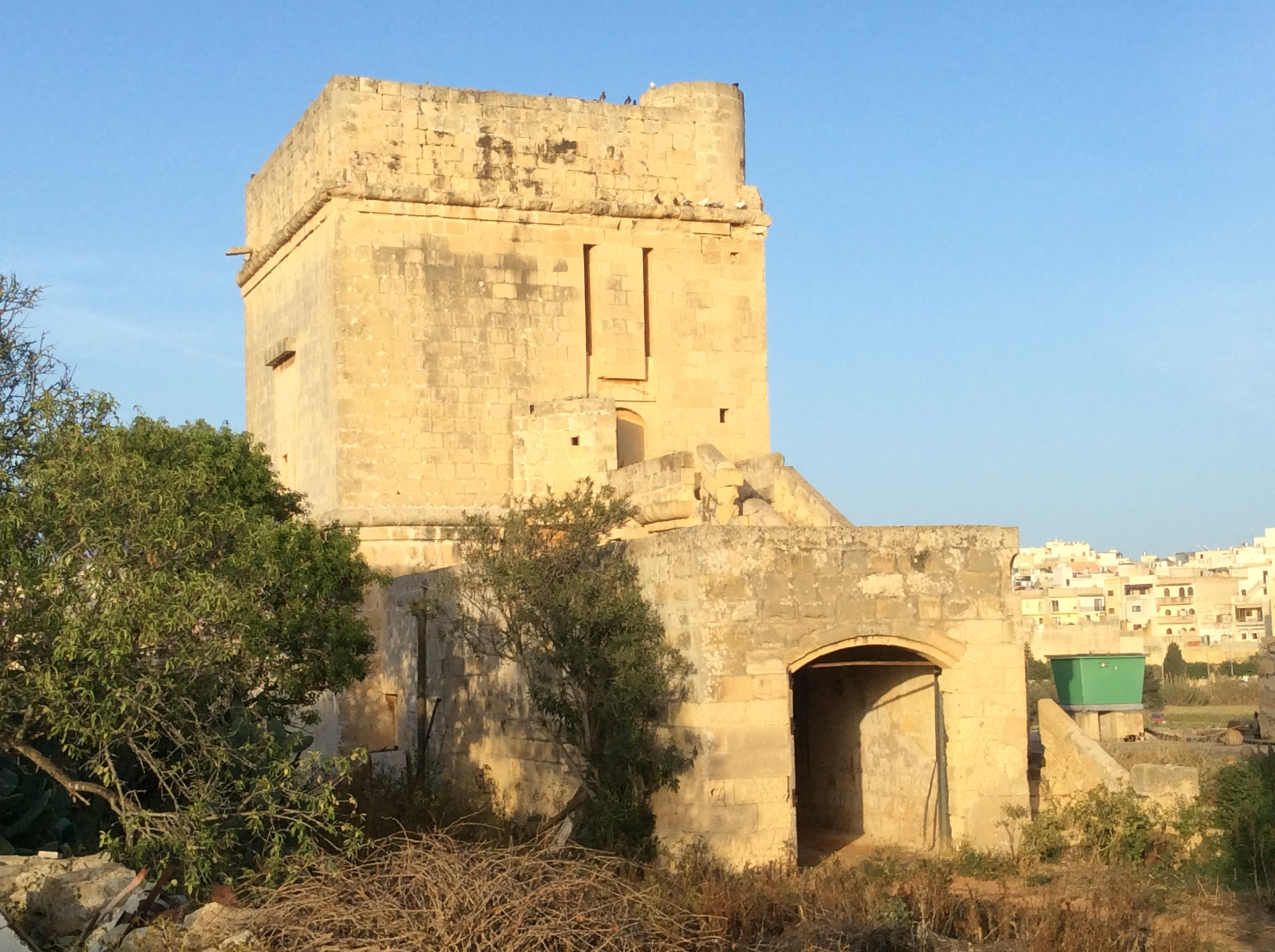
Torri Tal-Buttar

== Sports ==
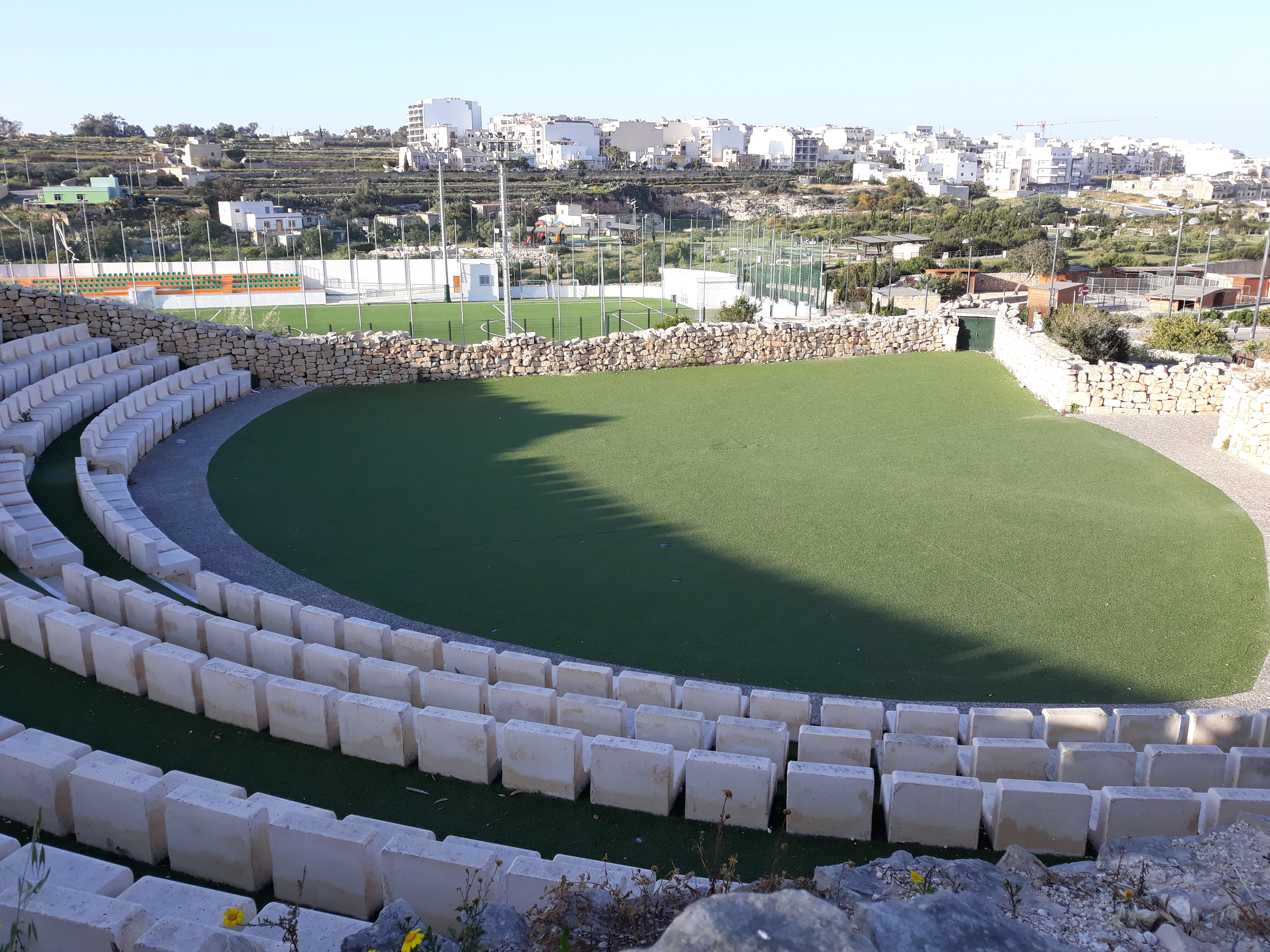
Amphitheatre and football pitch in Sant'Antnin Family Park

The main sports in Marsaskala are football and waterpolo. Marsaskala F.C. are a football club founded in 2010.

Marsaskala Sports Club, founded in 1927, and re-founded in 1974 is one of the oldest waterpolo clubs in Malta. Having languished in the second division for many years, Marsaskala Sports Club established themselves as one of Malta's top teams in the mid-nineties. In 1997 they were crowned Malta champions, the only season the trophy was won by a club from southern Malta. They have represented Malta in the Ligue Européenne de Natation (LEN) Trophy in Chios, Greece in 1997 and the European Champions Cup in 1998 in Ústí nad Labem, Czech Republic, becoming the first Maltese team to win two European Champions Cup matches, against Swiss champions Horgen and the hosts themselves.

Several Marsaskala Sports Club products have also played with distinction in the national team, amongst of which were Charles Flask, Alfred Xuereb il-Yogi, Charles Żammit, Joseph Caruana Dingli, Anton Privitera, Paul Privitera and John Licari. Both Joseph Caruana Dingli and Paul Privitera have also captained the Malta national team on many occasions.

Marsaskala was also the venue of the 2005 European Eight-ball Pool Championships and the European Darts Championships, both held at the Jerma Palace Hotel.

Marsaskala is popular with divers and swimmers.

=== Tal-Qroqq National Swimming Pool at Żonqor ===
At Żonqor point, the Tal-Qroqq sports complex includes Malta's national swimming pool (pixxina nazzjonali), with an Olympic 50-meter pool and a 25-meter pool, also heated in winter. The complex hosts Malta's waterpolo league and various international waterpolo and swimming tournaments. It also includes a sports hall, and can host up to 1,800 spectators.

A strategy for the Tal-Qroqq national pool complex was discussed in Parliament in 2010.

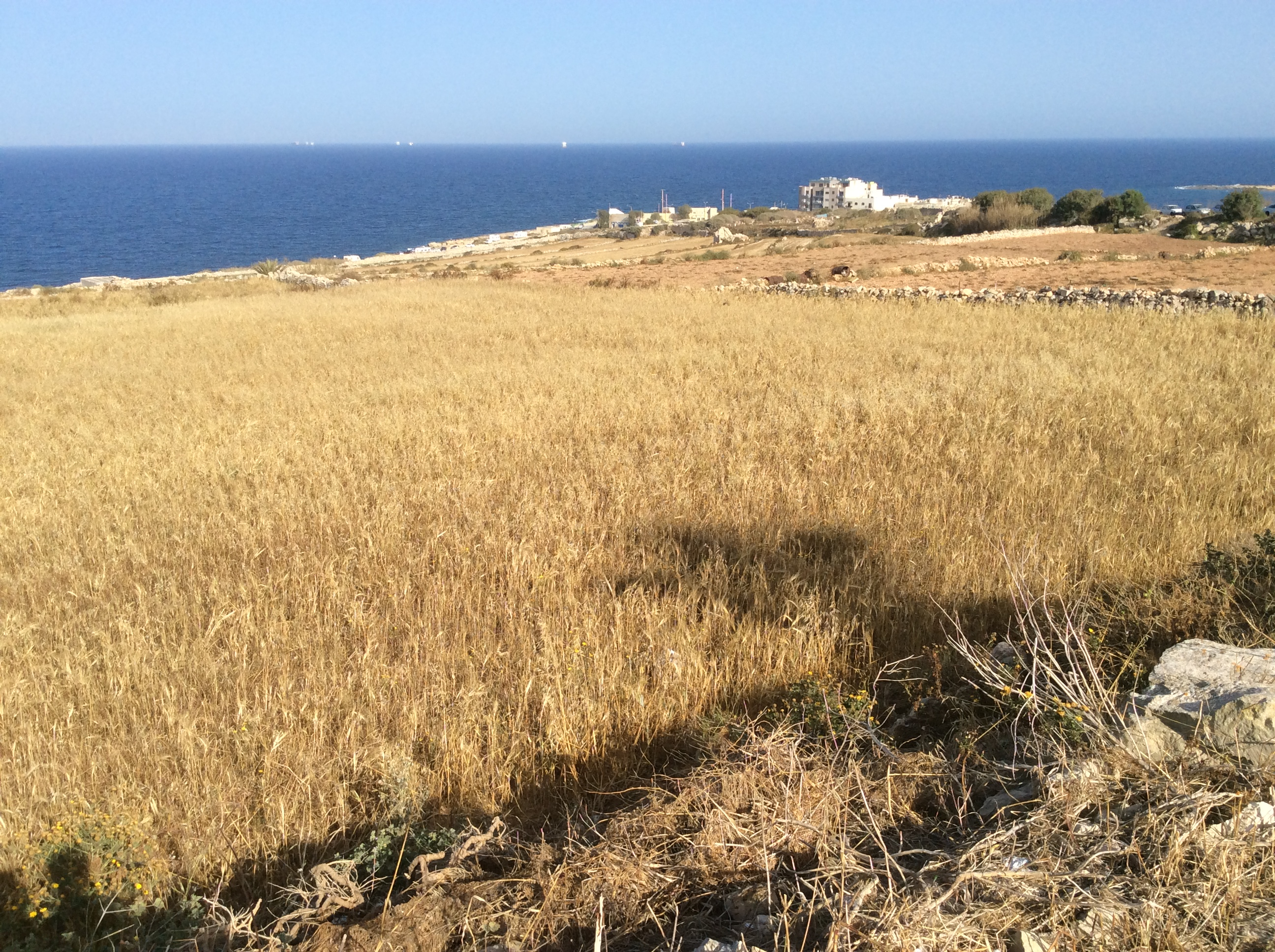
Żonqor Point, where the AUM campus was meant to be built

In 2016, the Government of Malta took up ownership of the site, estimated worth some €1.3 million in 2005, with the aim to unilaterally award it to Jordanian construction firm Sadeen to build a campus for a private American University of Malta (AUM). In exchange, under a secret deal with the Marsascala Sports Club, the government would have built a third waterpolo pitch across the bay at Is-Siberja.

The project faced strong opposition and was later scaled back, with Sadeen/AUM being granted land in Bormla and at Smart City in Xgħajra instead. In February 2022, the title of the land was returned to the Government of Malta, who awarded it back to the Marsascala Aquatic Sports Club.

== Parks and Recreation ==
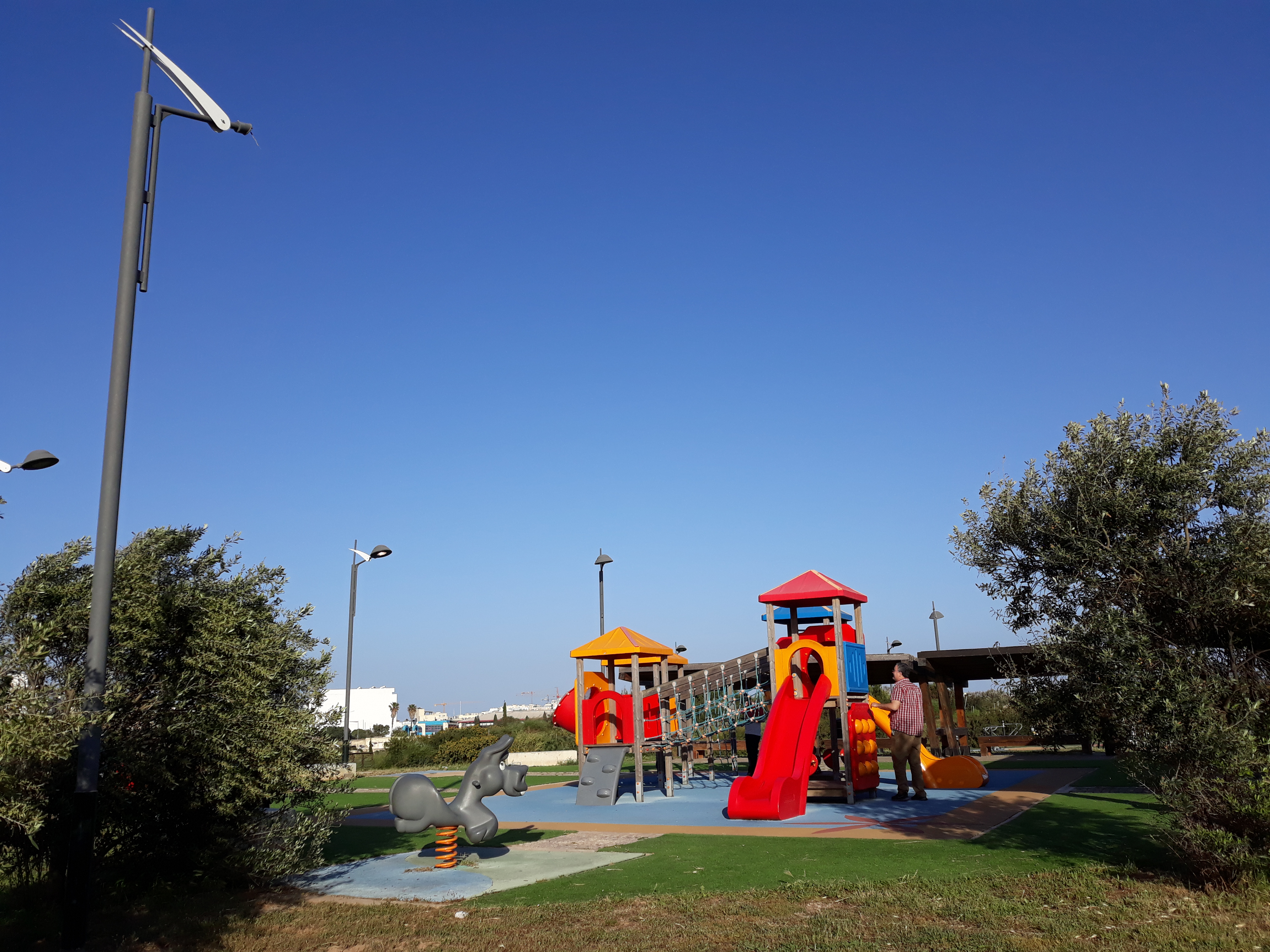
Sant'Antnin Family Park

- Sant'Antnin Family Park was inaugurated back in 2013 and covers the area of 85,000 square metres, making it one of the largest in Malta. It was refurbished in the early 2020s. It is planned to be extended over the additional 23,800 square metres formerly the site of the Sant'Antnin waste treatment plant.
- The coastline north from Zonqor point towards Xghajra is part of Il-Park Nazzjonali tal-Inwadar.
- Il-Maghluq is another natural reserve in the centre of town (Natura2000 site).

== Infrastructure ==
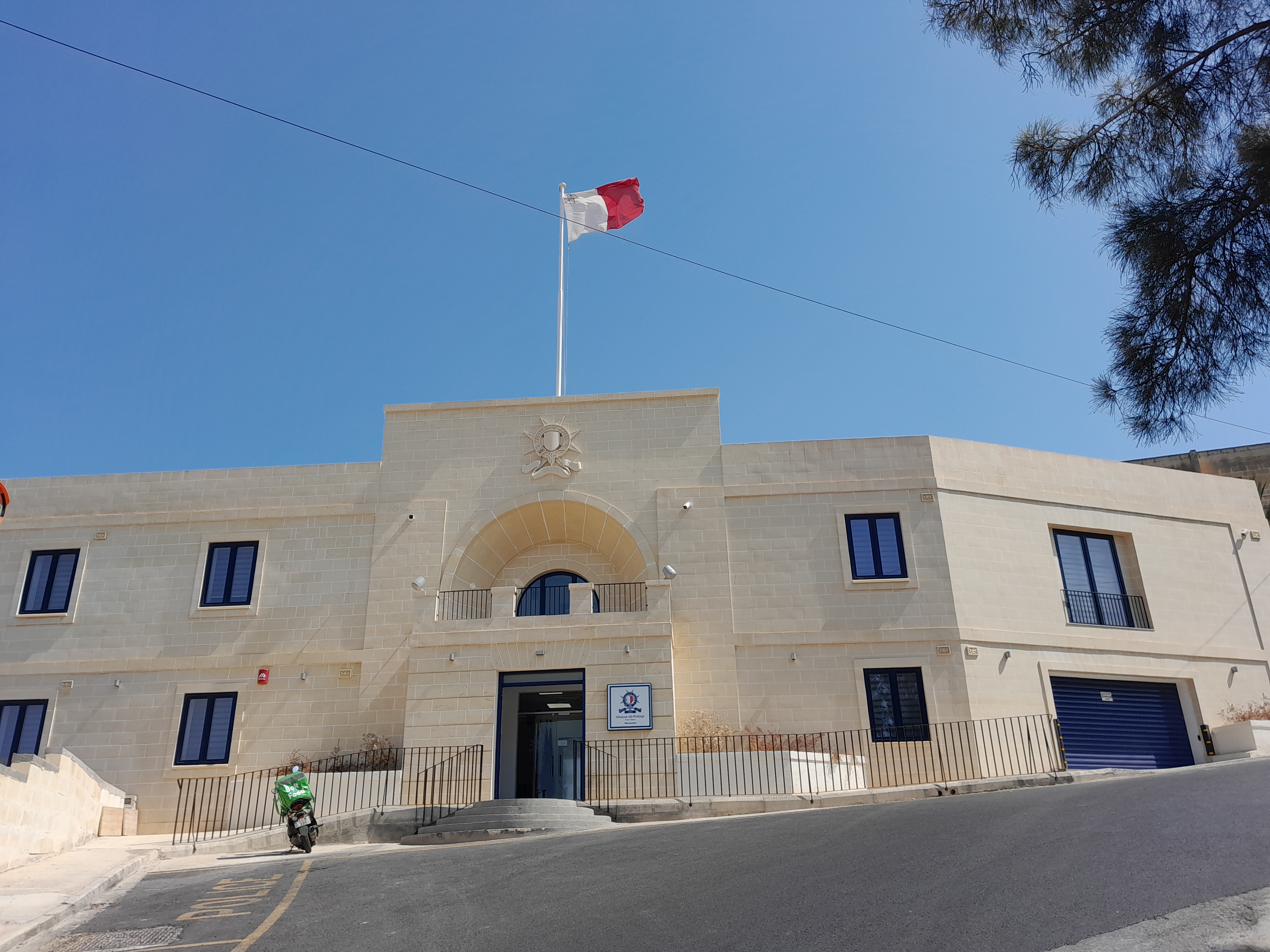
New police station (2024)

The bus terminal hosts three Tallinja lines connecting with Valletta via Żabbar, and one connecting to L-Isla. Marsaskala is also served by one line connecting to the airport.

=== Main roads ===
- Triq Ħaż-Żabbar (Zabbar Road)
- Triq id-Daħla ta' San Tumas (St Thomas Bay Road)
- Triq il-Qaliet (Qaliet Street)
- Triq is-Salini (Salini Street)
- Triq ix-Xatt (Marina Street)
- Triq iż-Żonqor (Zonqor Road)
- Triq La Sengle (La Sengle Street)
- Triq San Ġużepp (St Joseph Street)
- Triq San Luqa (St Luke Street)
- Triq Sant'Anna (St Anne Street)
- Triq Sant'Antnin (Sant'Antnin Road)
- Triq Tal-Gardiel (Tal-Gardiel Road)

== Education ==
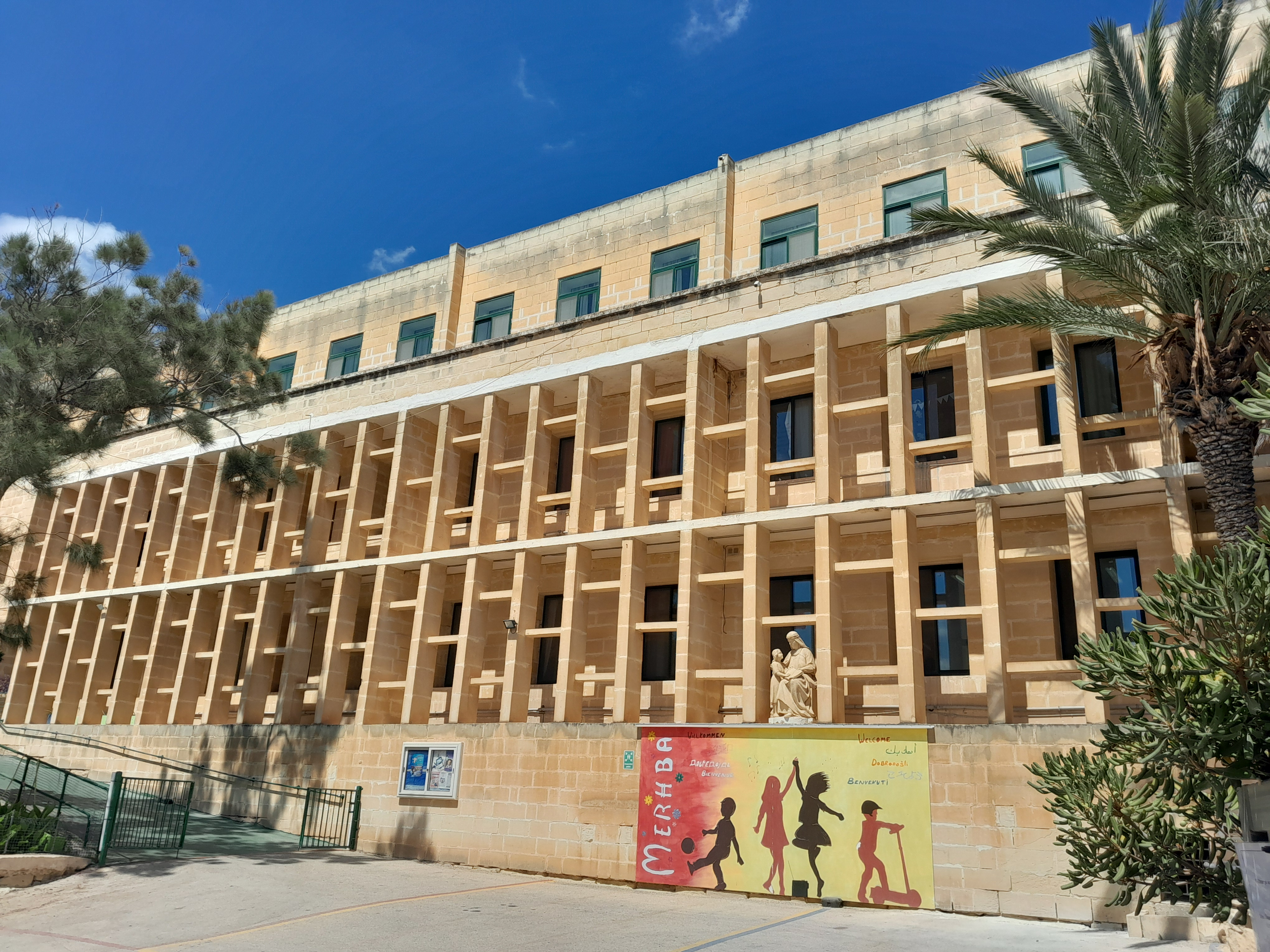
St Anne Primary School

Marsaskala's main primary school, St Anne Primary (Skola Primarja Sant'Anna), stands on the hill behind the parish church. It hosts 500 pupils. Given the high growth rates, a new primary school was opened in 2019, St Joachim Primary (Skola Primarja San Gwakkin), to cater to 300 pupils from the San Tumas area. Both schools are affiliated to STMC St Thomas More College (Kullegg San Tumas More), Zejtun.

The Marsaskala Branch Library is hosted within the premises of St Anne Primary.

== Notable people ==
Prime Minister Robert Abela, former president George Abela, former prime minister Lawrence Gonzi and two Labour Members of Parliament, Owen Bonnici and Helena Dalli live in the Marsaskala area.

== Twin towns – sister cities ==
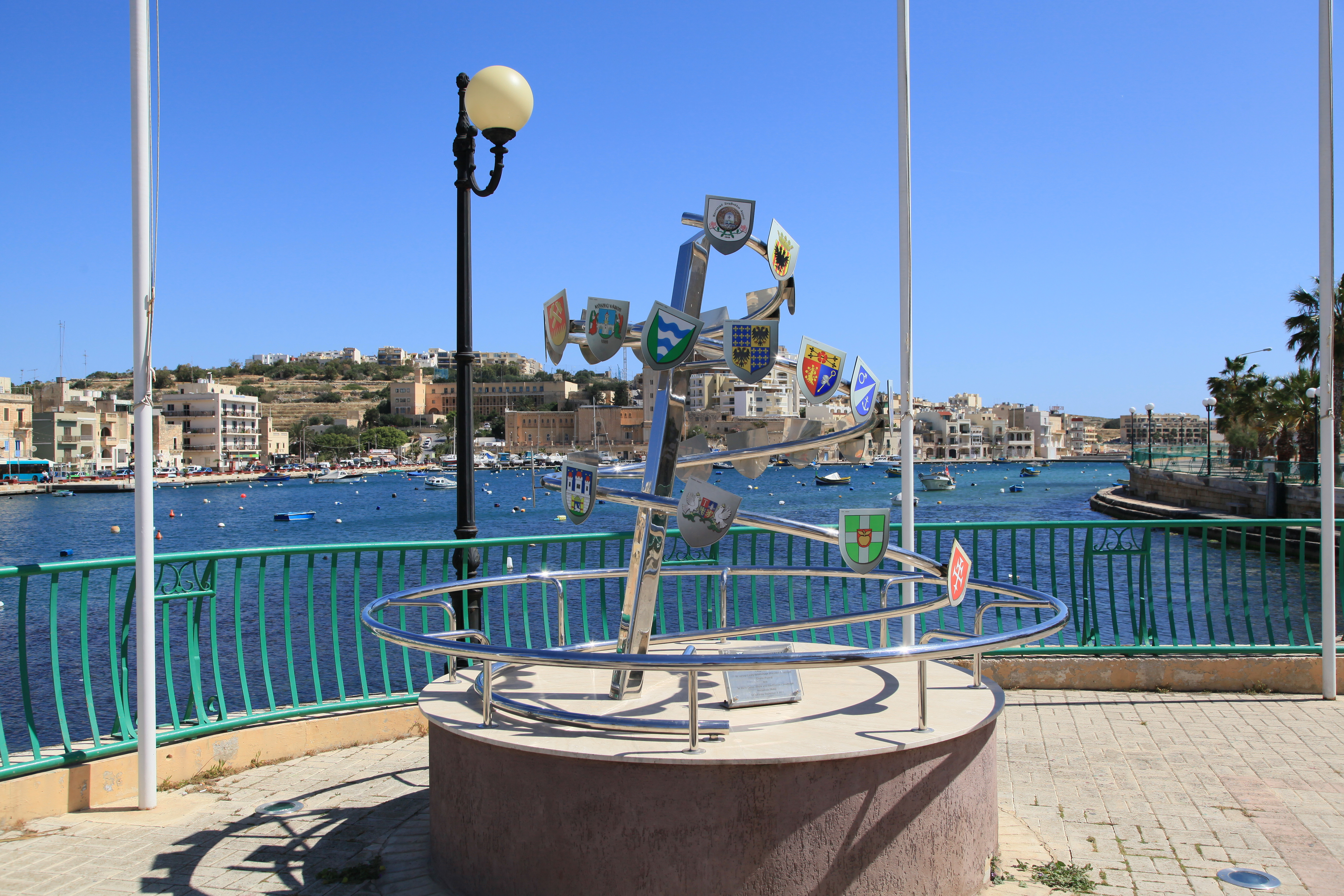
Marsaskala is a member of Douzelage

Marsaskala is a member of the Douzelage, a unique town twinning association of towns across the European Union. This active town twinning began in 1991 and Marsaskala joined in 2009. There are regular events, such as a produce market from each of the other countries and festivals.

- Agros, Cyprus
- Altea, Spain
- Asikkala, Finland
- Bad Kötzting, Germany
- Bellagio, Italy
- (Republic of Ireland) Bundoran, Ireland
- Chojna, Poland
- Dujiangyan, China
- Granville, France
- Holstebro, Denmark
- Houffalize, Belgium
- Judenburg, Austria
- Kőszeg, Hungary
- Meerssen, Netherlands
- Niederanven, Luxembourg
- Oxelösund, Sweden
- Preveza, Greece
- Rokiškis, Lithuania
- Rovinj, Croatia
- Sesimbra, Portugal
- Sherborne, United Kingdom
- Sigulda, Latvia
- Siret, Romania
- Škofja Loka, Slovenia
- Sušice, Czech Republic
- Tryavna, Bulgaria
- Türi, Estonia
- Zvolen, Slovakia
