= Villa Mondello =

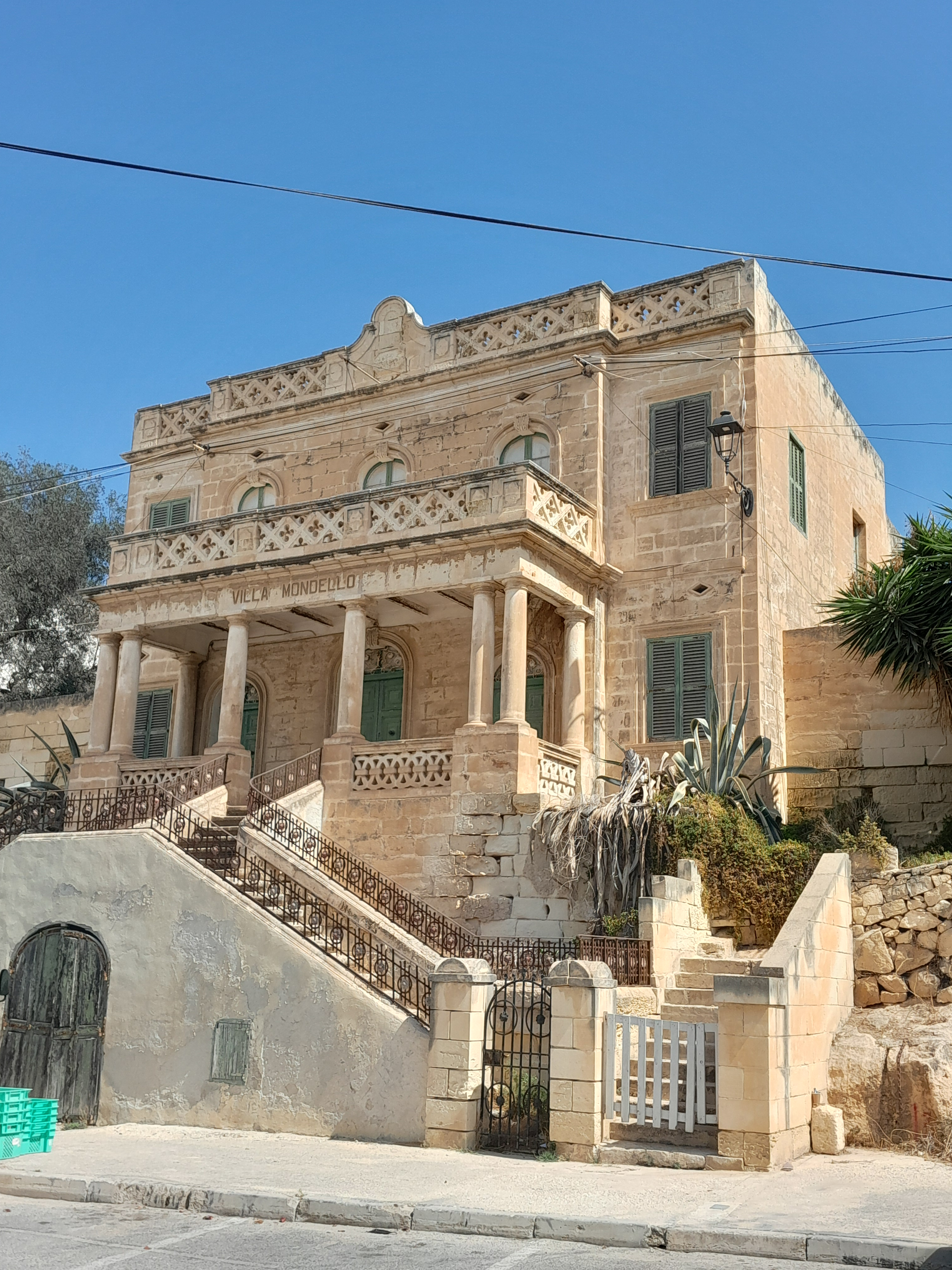

General information
- Status: Derelict
- Type: Villa
- Architectural style: Art Nouveau (Liberty)
- Location: Triq Santa Tereza, Marsaskala, Malta
- Coordinates: 35°52′01″N 14°33′48″E
- Completed: 1935
- Owner: Private

Villa Mondello is a historic villa located in Marsaskala, Malta. Notable for its distinctive architectural style and role in the local community, it remains a notable yet derelict landmark.

== History ==
Constructed in 1935, the villa is notable for its Art Nouveau (Liberty) style, drawing aesthetic inspiration from the seaside villas of Mondello, a coastal suburb of Palermo, thus reflecting regional Mediterranean design influences. Its façade and elevated position give it a commanding presence overlooking the nearby St Anne’s Gardens.

Villa Mondello originally hosted the Marsaskala school before World War II. It was once owned by a family from Bormla. A vegetable seller used to sell from the door beneath the front stairs.

Although designated as a listed building, Villa Mondello has fallen into a state of dereliction and remains in private ownership. Despite its architectural and historical value, the building has not undergone significant restoration.

During the 2010s, there was a local proposal to construct a new Local Council building within the grounds of St Anne’s Gardens, which prompted discussions about restoring Villa Mondello. However, the restoration proposals were not advanced.

== See also ==
- Architecture of Malta
- List of monuments in Marsaskala
