= Sant'Antnin Family Park =

Large park in Malta

Sant' Antnin Family Park
- Saint Andrew Park
- Il-Park Ta' Sant Antnin
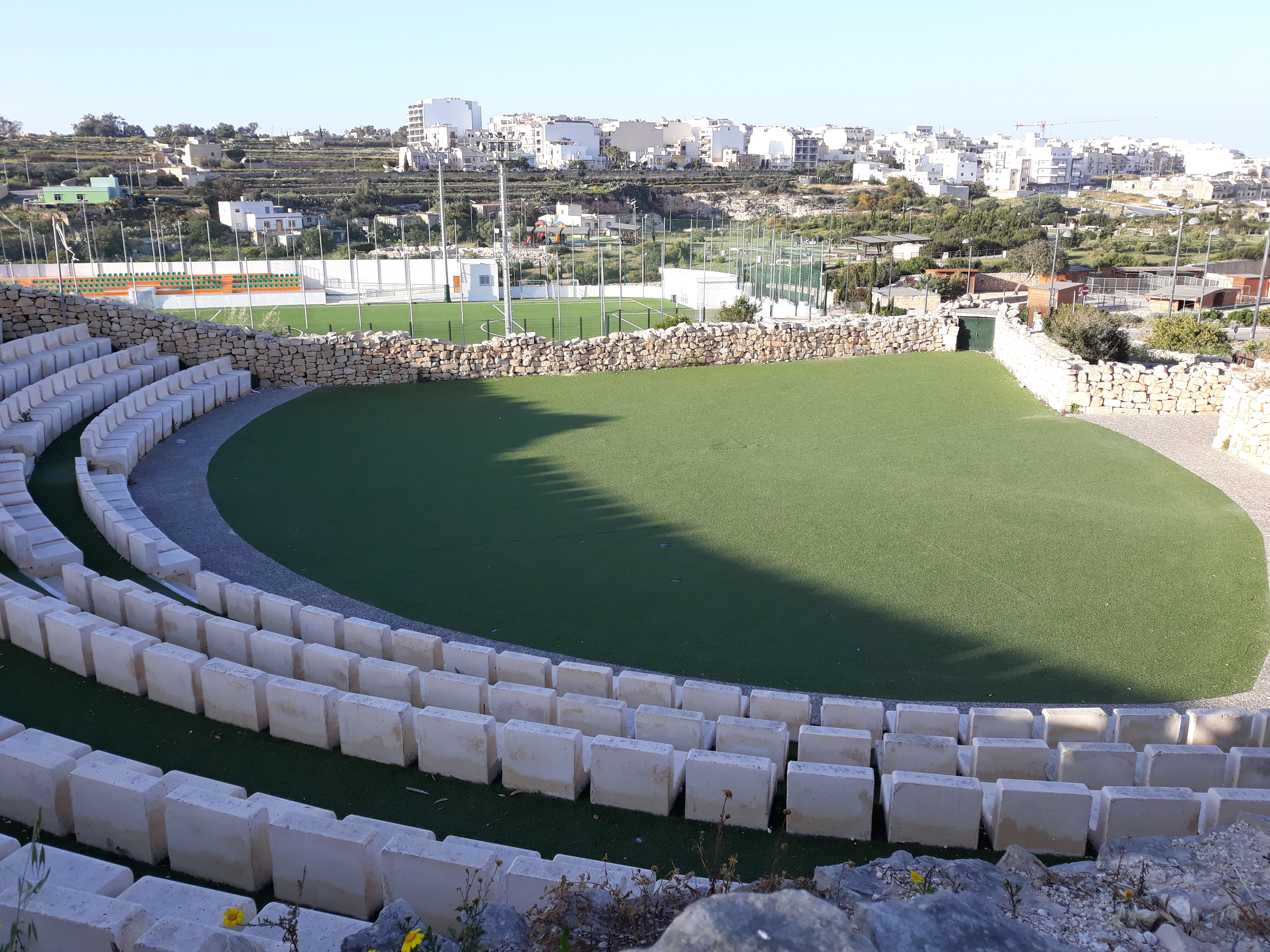
- The Amphitheater located in the park

- Location within Malta
- Type: Family Park
- Location: Marsaskala, Malta.
- Nearest town: Marsaskala
- Coordinates: 35°51′43″N 14°33′19″E
- Area: 89,900 square metres (968,000 sq ft)
- Elevation: 12 metres (39 ft)
- Designated: February 2013
- Etymology: Saint Andrew
- Administrator: Wasteserv Malta
- Operator: Government Of Malta
- Terrain: Garigue

Sant'Antnin Family Park (Maltese: Il-Park ta Sant Antnin) is a large park and playground complex 1.51 kilometres (0.94 mi) west of the town of Marsaskala, located on the eastern edge of the island of Malta. It is considered to be the largest of this type of park in the entire country, coming in with an area of around 968,000 square feet (89,900 m^{2}).

The Sant' Antin Recycling plant is located adjacent to the park, causing controversy after the 2017 fire that shutdown recycling on the island for more than 3 years. The park was a landfill in the past which had been developed into what it is today using funds given to the Maltese Government by the European Union. Sant'Antnin also houses a football pitch, an outdoor gym and used to be an enclosed dog park but now it is gone.

A chapel dedicated to Saint Andrew can be found around 50 metres (160 ft) from the park.
