= Wignacourt =

Wignacourt is a surname. Notable people with the surname include:

== House of Vignacourt ==
- Adrien de Wignacourt (1618–1697), Grand Master of the Knights Hospitaller from 1690 to 1697
- Alof de Wignacourt (1547–1622), Grand Master of the Knights Hospitaller from 1601 to 1622
- Maximilien de Wignacourt (1560–1620), Baroque poet
- Vignacourt, a comune in France

== See also ==
- Portrait of Alof de Wignacourt and his Page (Caravaggio) (1607–1608), painting by the Italian master Caravaggio, in the Louvre of Paris
- Wignacourt towers, a series of fortified towers on Malta built by Alof de Wignacourt from 1610 to 1620
  - Wignacourt Tower, the first of these towers
- Wignacourt Aqueduct, an aqueduct on Malta built by Alof de Wignacourt from 1610 to 1615
  - Wignacourt Arch, an archway within the aqueduct
- Wignacourt Museum, a museum in Rabat, Malta named after Alof de Wignacourt
