= Vittorio Cassar =

Maltese architect and military engineer (c. 1550 – c. 1609)

- Vitor Cassar
- Born: Gio Vittorio Cassar c. 1550 probably Birgu, Hospitaller Malta
- Died: c. June 1609
- Resting place: probably Valletta
- Occupations: Architect and military engineer
- Employer: Order of St. John
- Notable work: Upgrading of the Cittadella
- Parents: Girolamo Cassar (father); Mattea Cassar (mother)

Vittorio Cassar (Maltese: Vitor Cassar, c. 1550 – c. 1609), born Gio Vittorio Cassar, was a Maltese architect and military engineer. The son of the renowned architect Girolamo Cassar, he was admitted as a knight within the Order of St. John in 1587. He became the Order's resident engineer in the early 17th century, and he directed the upgrading of the Cittadella of Gozo between 1600 and 1603.

Many details about his life are uncertain, including the dates of his birth and death. He is claimed to have designed some of the Wignacourt towers and several churches, but there is no evidence of these attributions.

== Biography ==
Vittorio Cassar was probably the firstborn son of Girolamo Cassar and his wife Mattea, and he was his father's favourite and principal heir. He is said to have been born in around 1550, but this date is mainly based on speculation. The Cassar family, probably originating from Sicily, had been established in Malta since at least the year 1440.

Cassar was admitted as a knight within the Order of St. John on 9 April 1587, joining the Langue of Castille, Léon and Portugal (there was no langue for Maltese knights). On 18 May of the same year, he was created serjeant-at-arms at the Church of St. Paul's Shipwreck in Valletta. In around 1594, the Order sent Cassar to tour various towns in Italy in order to study the latest architectural styles and meet famous engineers.

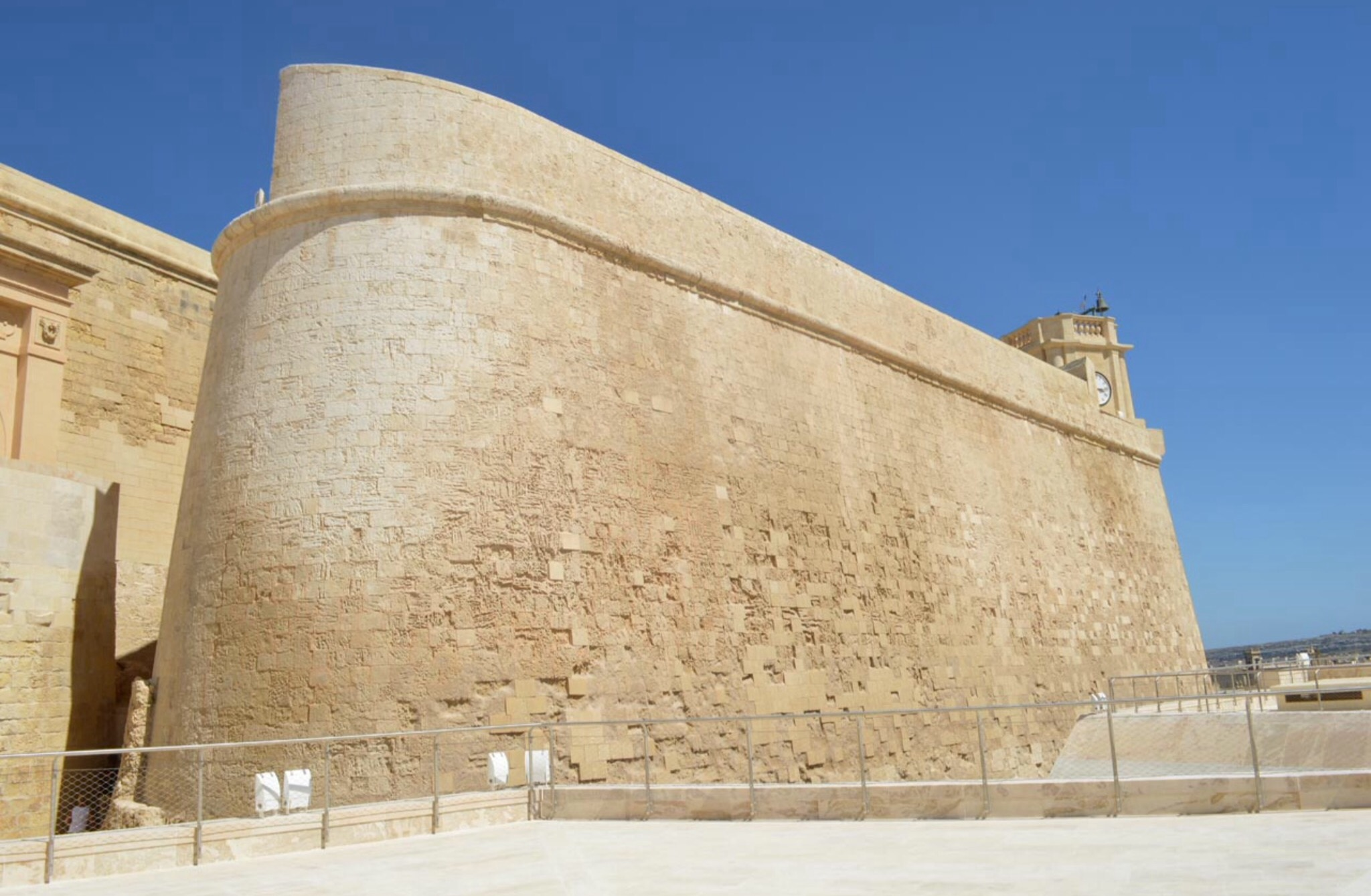
Cassar directed the upgrading of the Cittadella between 1600 and 1603

In around 1600, Cassar was appointed as the Order's resident engineer, a post which had been previously held by his father. In September 1600, Cassar was assigned to direct the upgrading of the fortifications of the Cittadella on Gozo. During his stay on Gozo, he also produced designs for the Garzes Tower, but the tower was eventually built after Cassar left the island. Cassar developed an uneasy relationship with the island's governor, Fra Ferdinando de Rosolmini, which led to him being recalled to Malta in August 1603 after being repeatedly reprimand due to the slow progress of the works.

The date and circumstances of Cassar's death are unknown. It has been traditionally held that he died in 1607, when he erected a slab commemorating himself within the Chapel of St. Barbara in the Cittadella. However, military historian Stephen C. Spiteri states that he died in around mid-June 1609, and some records suggest that he was buried in Valletta. He was definitely dead by 14 May 1615, when his mother Mattea made her will and referred to masses for the repose of Vittorio's soul.

== Buildings attributed to Cassar ==
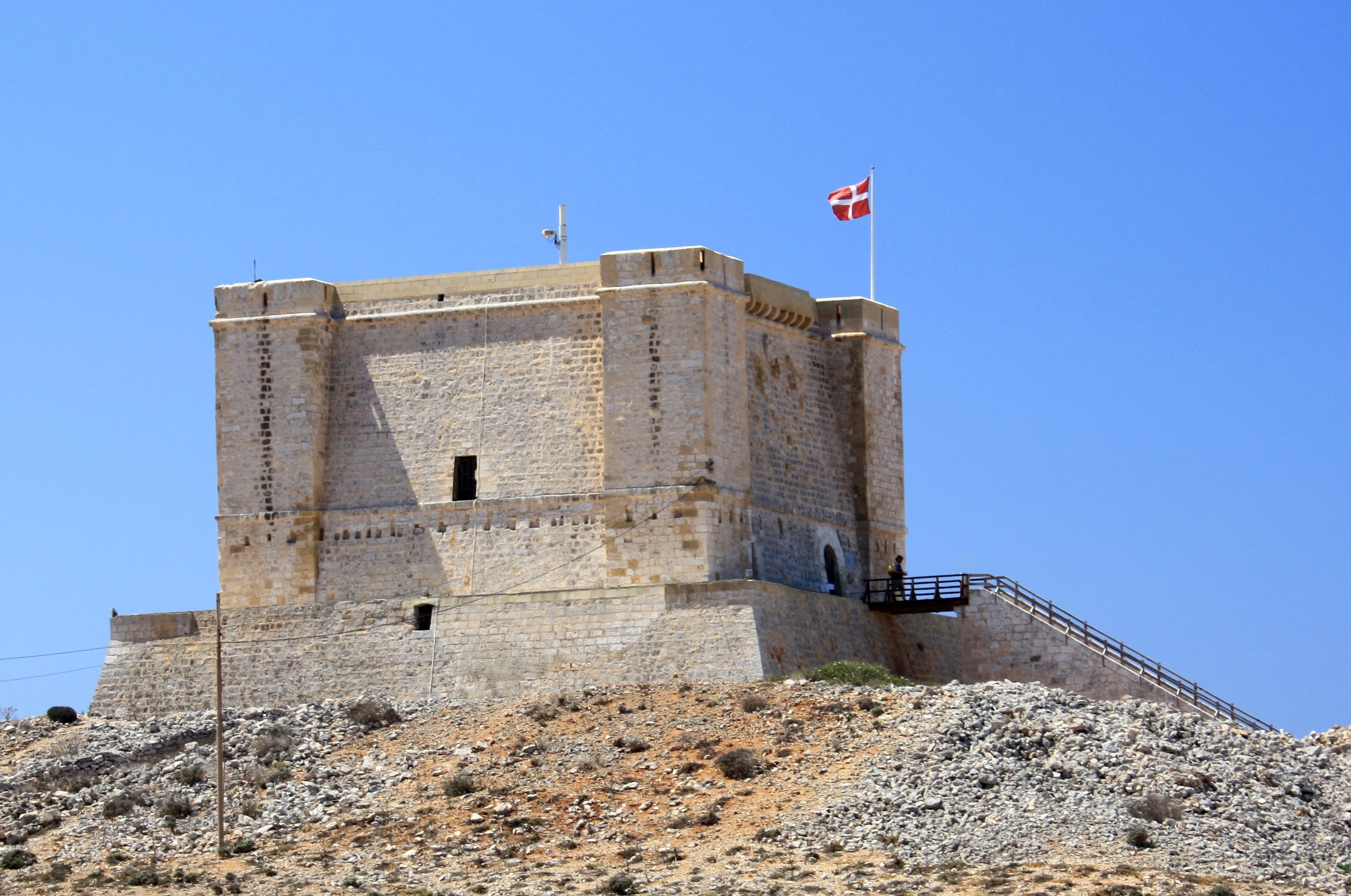
Saint Mary's Tower, which was attributed to Cassar by Giovanni Francesco Abela. This claim is unlikely since Cassar was already dead when work on the tower began.

There is very little documentary evidence about Cassar's work as an architect or military engineer. The only evidence of his work as a military engineer are documents relating to his directing the rebuilding of the Cittadella between 1600 and 1603, and mentions of preliminary sketches of the Garzes Tower dated 1601–02.

Many other buildings have been attributed to Cassar, but these claims are dubious and unlikely, since there is no evidence supporting them. As early as 1647, Giovanni Francesco Abela attributed the design of the Saint Mary's Tower on Comino (built 1618) to Cassar. In 1703, Bartolomeo dal Pozzo attributed both the Comino tower and Santa Maria delle Grazie Tower (built 1620) to him, and the claim was later extended to include three other Wignacourt towers – St. Paul (1610), St. Lucian (1610–11) and St. Thomas (1614) towers. However, Cassar is believed to have died in 1609, before work on the first Wignacourt tower had begun.

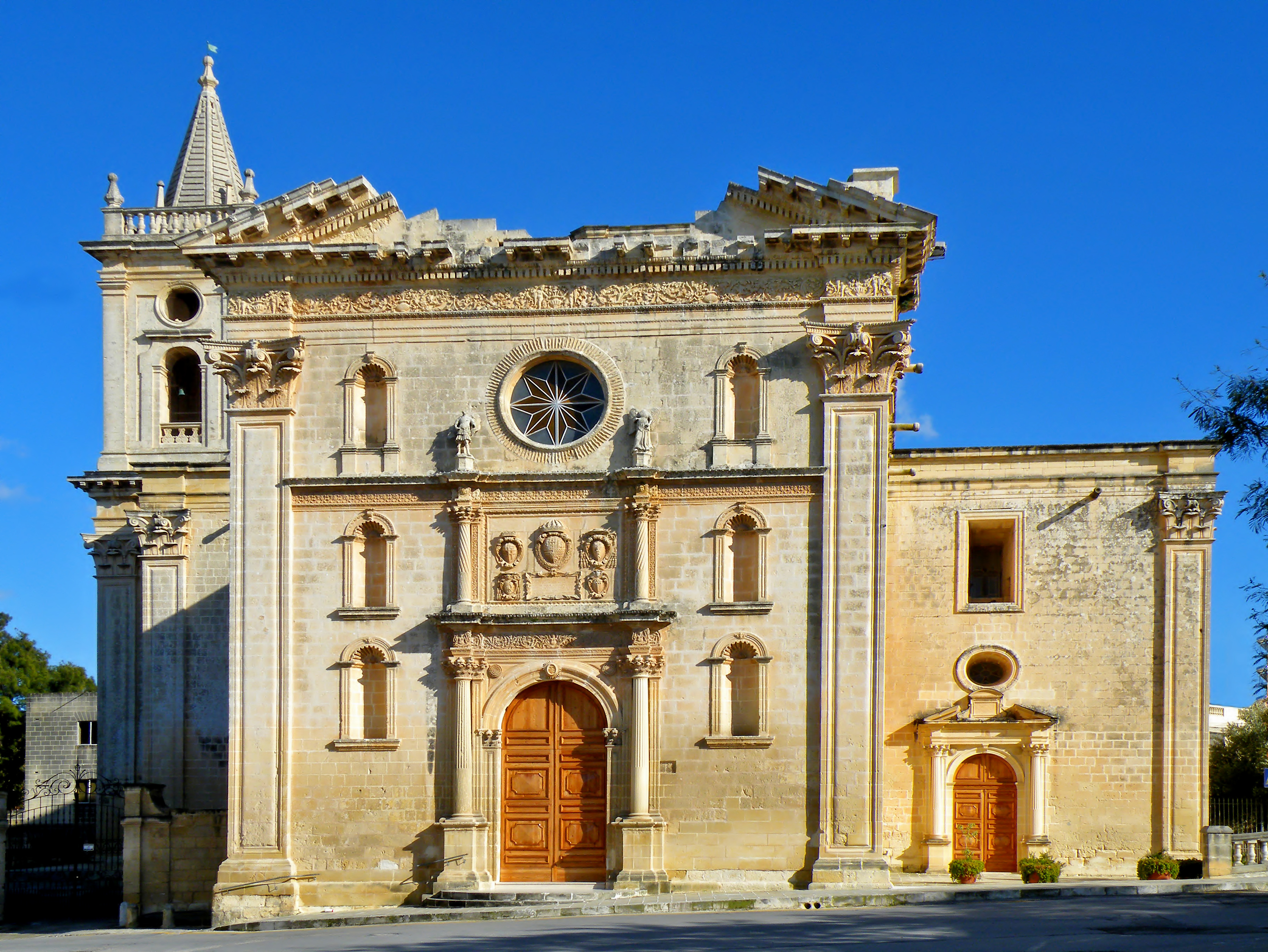
The Parish Church of St. Mary in Birkirkara, one of several churches attributed to Cassar without any evidence supporting the claim

The following churches are attributed to Cassar, but once again there is no documentary evidence supporting any of these attributions.

- Our Lady of Victories Parish Church in Senglea (c. 1580)
- Church of St. George in Qormi (c. 1584)
- Church of St. Philip of Agira in Żebbuġ (c. 1599)
- Church of St. Mary in Attard (c. 1600)
- Parish Church of St. Mary in Birkirkara (c. 1615)
- Church of Our Lady of Victory in Naxxar (c. 1610)
- St Ubaldesca Church in Paola (1630)

== Personal life ==
Vittorio Cassar was short tempered and was often involved in quarrels and criminal offences. He was imprisoned for six months in Fort St. Angelo after harassing another knight and beating his servant. In 1604, he and his brother Gabriele were involved in a fight with some "secular persons". The circumstances of this incident are unknown, but it was regarded as a serious offence.

Between the 1590s and 1606, the Inquisition accused and sentenced Cassar for practicing fortune-telling, and he was said to be able to relieve people and read their future. He is said to have had a relationship with Gioanna La Siracusana, a magician and prostitute. It is now believed that Cassar's "sins" included possession of banned manuscripts about magic which he had obtained in Messina.
