= Ta' Tabibu Farmhouse =

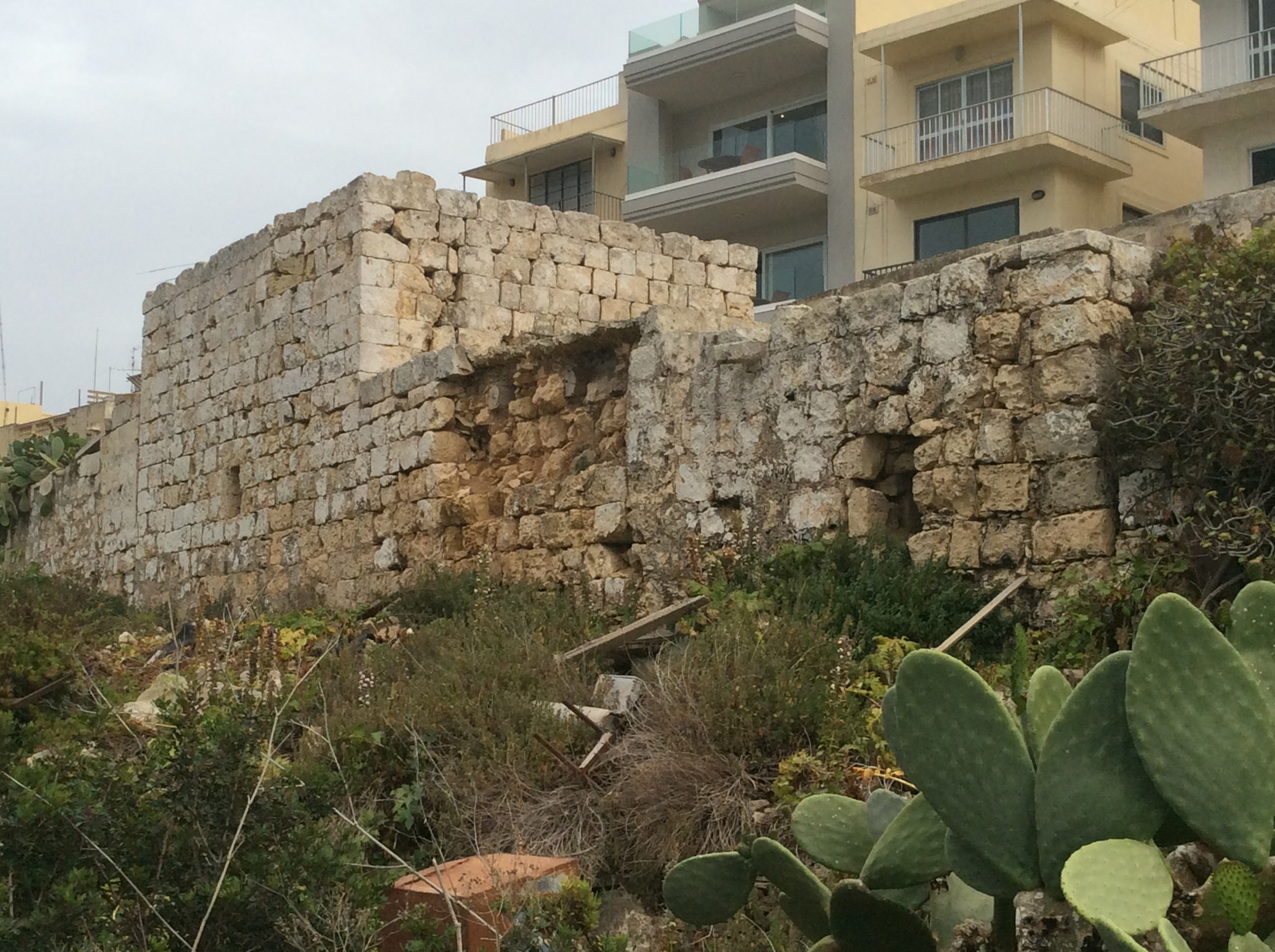
- View of Ta' Tabibu Farmhouse
- Interactive map of Ta' Tabibu Farmhouse

General information
- Status: Intact but dilapidated
- Type: Militia watch post Farmhouse
- Architectural style: Vernacular
- Location: Triq it-Tonn, St. Paul's Bay, Malta
- Coordinates: 35°56′52.1″N 14°23′36.9″E
- Named for: Former farmer
- Completed: 14th or 15th-century
- Owner: Private property

Technical details
- Material: Limestone
- Floor count: 1

Ta' Tabibu Farmhouse, originally known as the Dejma Tower, is a medieval building in St. Paul's Bay, Malta, which originally served as a militia watch post. It was later converted into a farmhouse and remains so until the present.

== History ==
The Dejma Tower was built in the 14th or 15th centuries as part of Malta's early network of coastal fortifications. It was manned by the Dejma, the local militia responsible for coastal defence. It is the oldest surviving building in St. Paul's Bay, with the exception of megalithic and Roman ruins such as Buġibba Temple and San Pawl Milqi.

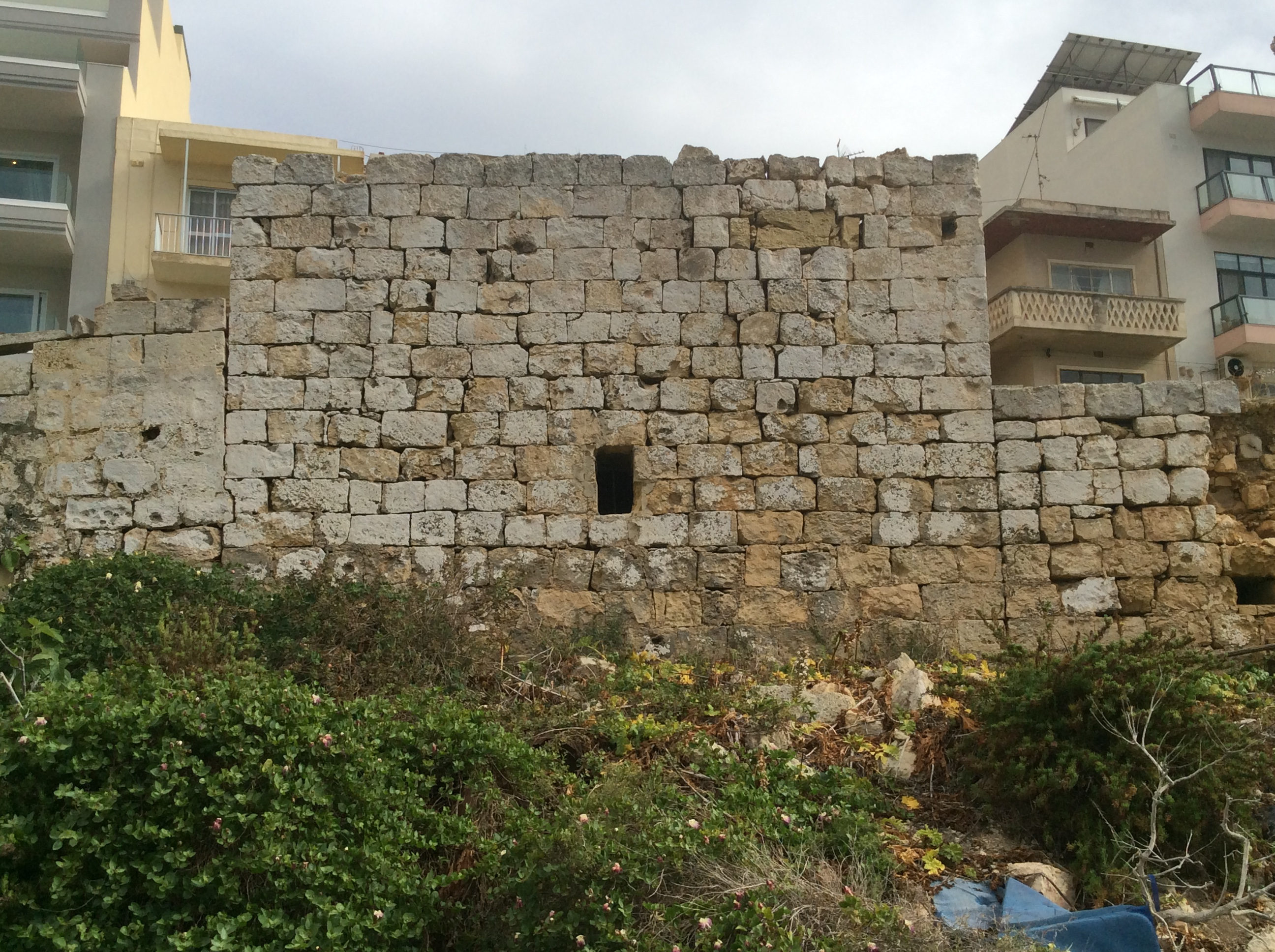
The original 14/15th-century militia watch post with later additions on the side

The building was the only defensive building in St. Paul's Bay until the construction of the Wignacourt Tower in 1610. This tower was the first of a new network of coastal towers that were built in Malta in the 17th century.

At some point, it was converted into a farmhouse and was eventually given the name Ta' Tabibu, literally meaning "of the medical practitioner", a probable nickname of one of the previous owners.

In World War II, bombs fell in the area around the farmhouse, but did not hit the building itself. Today, the building remains intact but is in a dilapidated state.

== Ecology and heritage ==
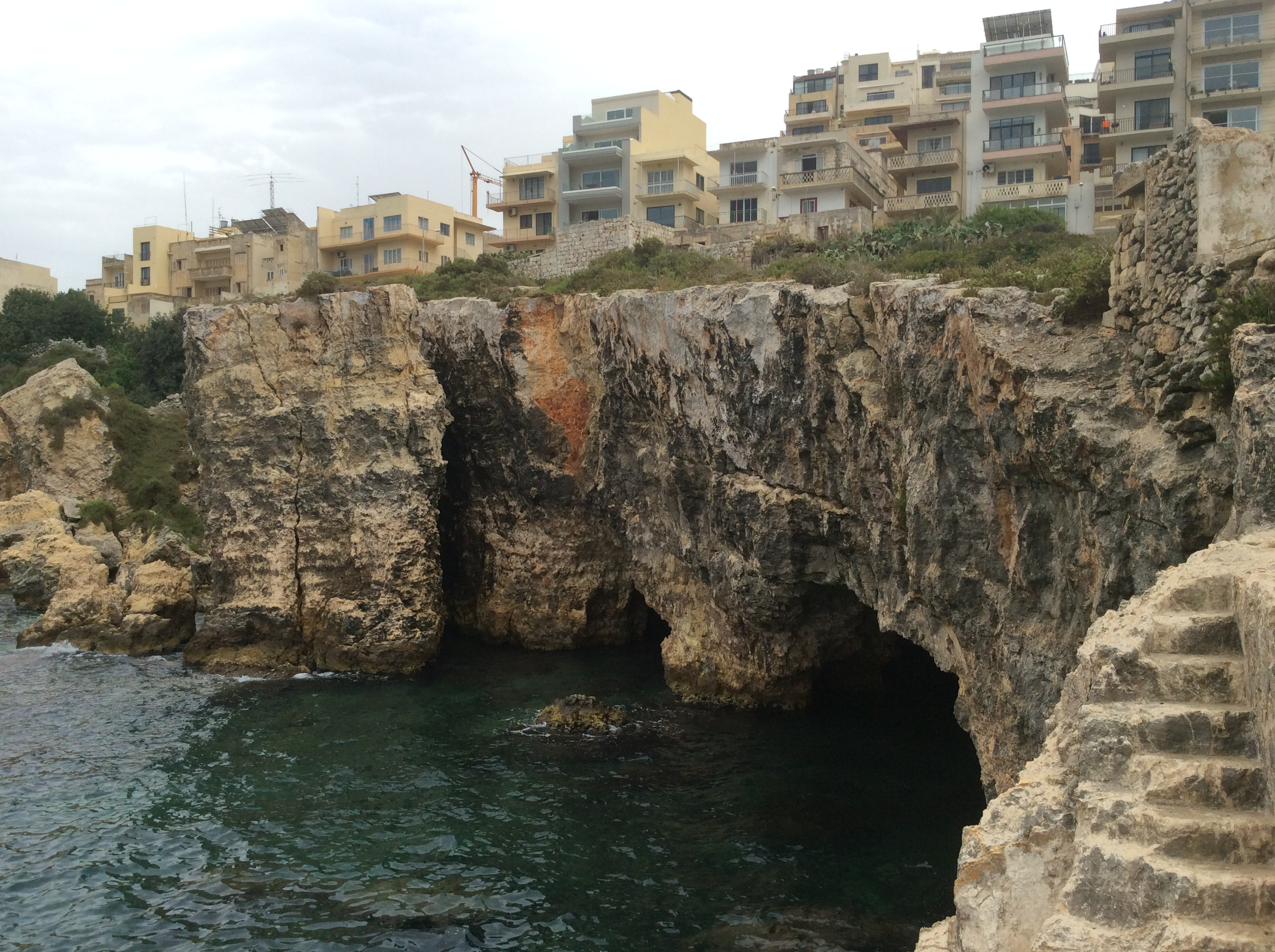
Ta' Tabibu Farmhouse in the distance, standing close to the cliffs and surrounded by vegetation

The area around the farmhouse has unique flora and fauna, and is protected by the Maltese authorities as an Out of Development Zone (ODZ), Area of Ecological Importance (AEI) and Site of Scientific Importance (SSI).

In 2010, the Malta Environment and Planning Authority refused to allow modern buildings to be built near the Ta' Tabibu farmhouse due to the area's ecological importance. This decision was welcomed by the heritage NGO Flimkien għal Ambjent Aħjar.
