= Xgħajra =

Xgħajra Ix-Xgħajra
- Local council
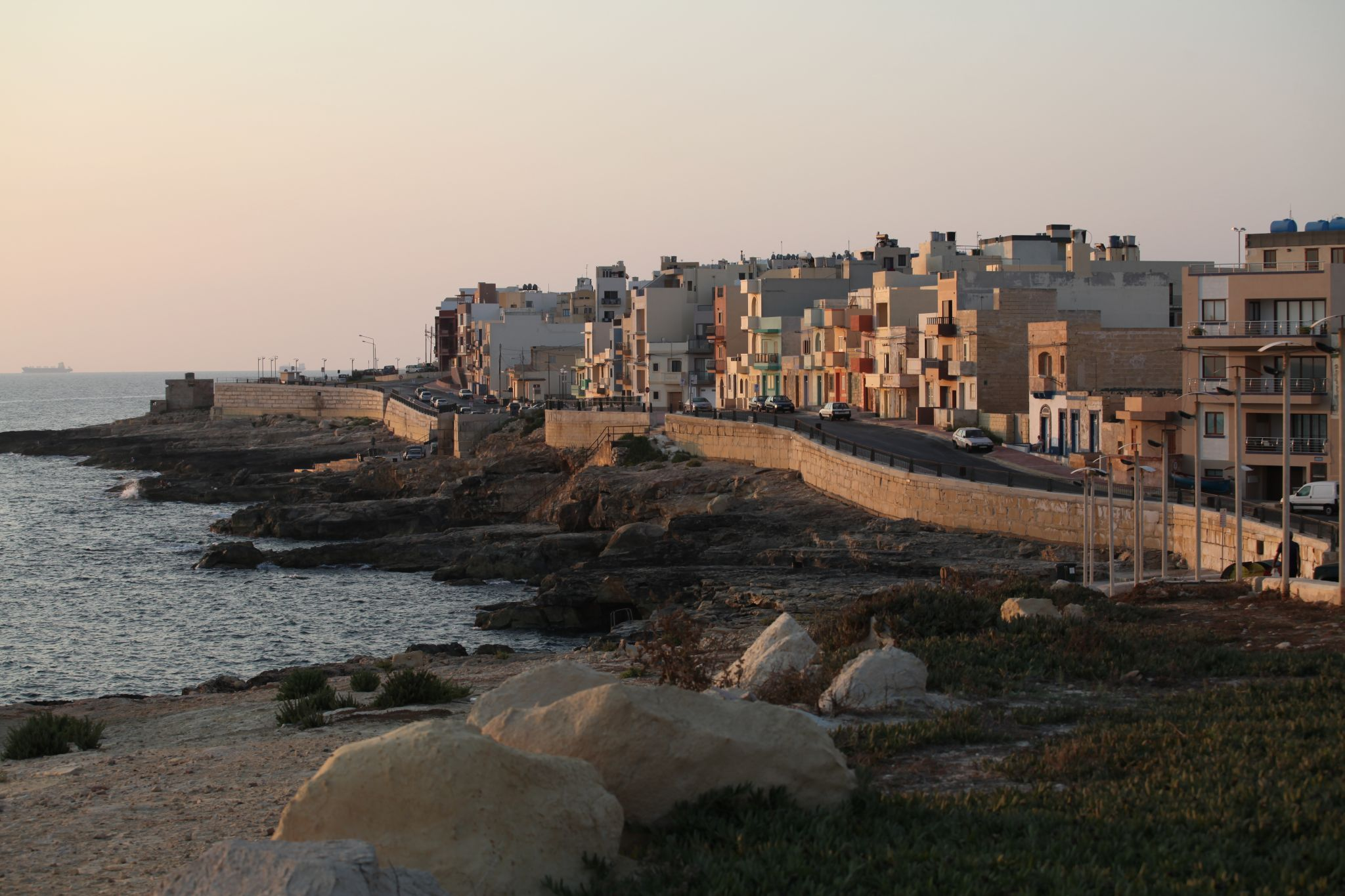
- Xgħajra seafront

- Flag Coat of arms

- Coordinates: 35°53′11″N 14°32′50″E
- Country: Malta
- Region: Port Region
- District: Southern Harbour District
- Borders: Kalkara, Żabbar

Government
  - Mayor: Neil Attard (PL)

Area
  - Total: 1 km^{2} (0.39 sq mi)

Population (Jul. 2024)
  - Total: 2,440
  - Density: 2,400/km^{2} (6,300/sq mi)
- Demonym(s): Xgħajri (m), Xgħajrija (f), Xgħajrin (pl)
- Time zone: UTC+1 (CET)
  - Summer (DST): UTC+2 (CEST)
- Postal code: XJR
- Dialing code: 356
- ISO 3166 code: MT-63
- Patron saint: Our Lady of Graces
- Day of festa: Sunday after 8 September
- Website: Official website

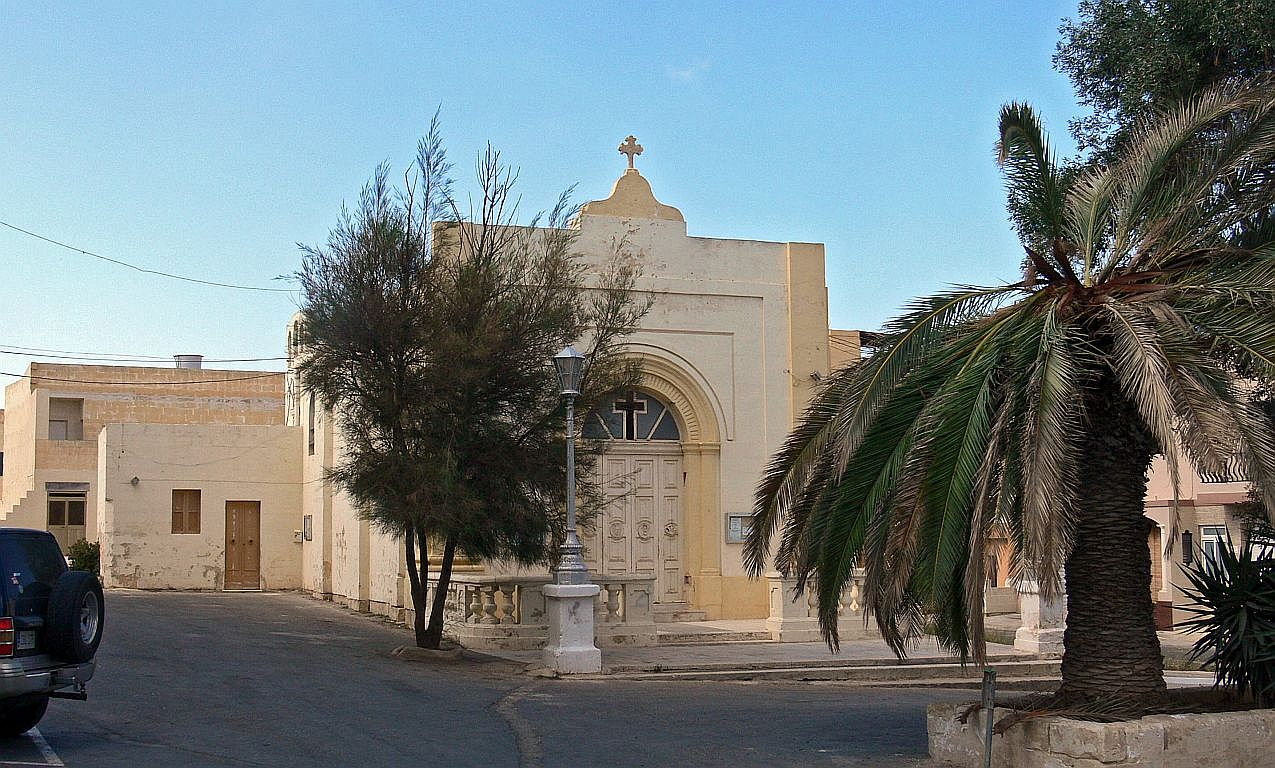
Chapel of Xgħajra

Xgħajra (Maltese: Ix-Xgħajra) is a small village in the Port Region of Malta. It is located on the coast, about halfway between Valletta and Marsaskala. Its local football club is known as the Xgħajra Tornadoes F.C.

The population of Xgħajra was 2,440 in July 2024. This included 1,351 males and 1,089 females; 1,820 Maltese nationals and 620 foreign nationals.

== Local Council ==
The current local council members are:

- Attard, Neil (Sindku) - PL
- Pulis, Rosabelle (vici Sindku) - PL
- Valvo, Anthony - PL
- Camilleri, Raymond - PL
- Borġ, Doris - Independent

== Zones in Xgħajra ==
- San Pietru
- Ta' Alessi
- Ta' Maġġi
- Tal-Qassisin
- Tan-Nisa
- Tumbrell
- Wied Glavan

== Main Roads ==
- Dawret ix-Xatt (Strand By-Pass)
- Triq Ħaż-Żabbar (Zabbar Road)
- Triq il-Fortizza tal-Grazzja (Grazzia Fort Street)
- Triq il-Knisja (Church Street)
- Triq it-Torri ta' Alof de Wignacourt (Alof de Wignacourt Tower Street). This road refers to the Santa Maria delle Grazie Tower which the Knights of Malta erected in 1620 during the reign of Grand Master Fra Alof de Wignacourt, which was one of the set of Wignacourt towers. The British demolished the tower to clear a field of fire for the Della Grazie Battery which they constructed in 1888.

== Twin towns – sister cities ==
Xgħajra is twinned with:

- Colletorto, Italy
- Le Fauga, France
- Pelplin, Poland
- Alsónémedi, Hungary
