= Wignacourt Tower =

Large bastioned watchtower and battery in St. Paul's Bay, Malta

Wignacourt Tower & Battery
- Torri u Batterija ta' Wignacourt
- Part of the Wignacourt towers
- St. Paul's Bay, Malta
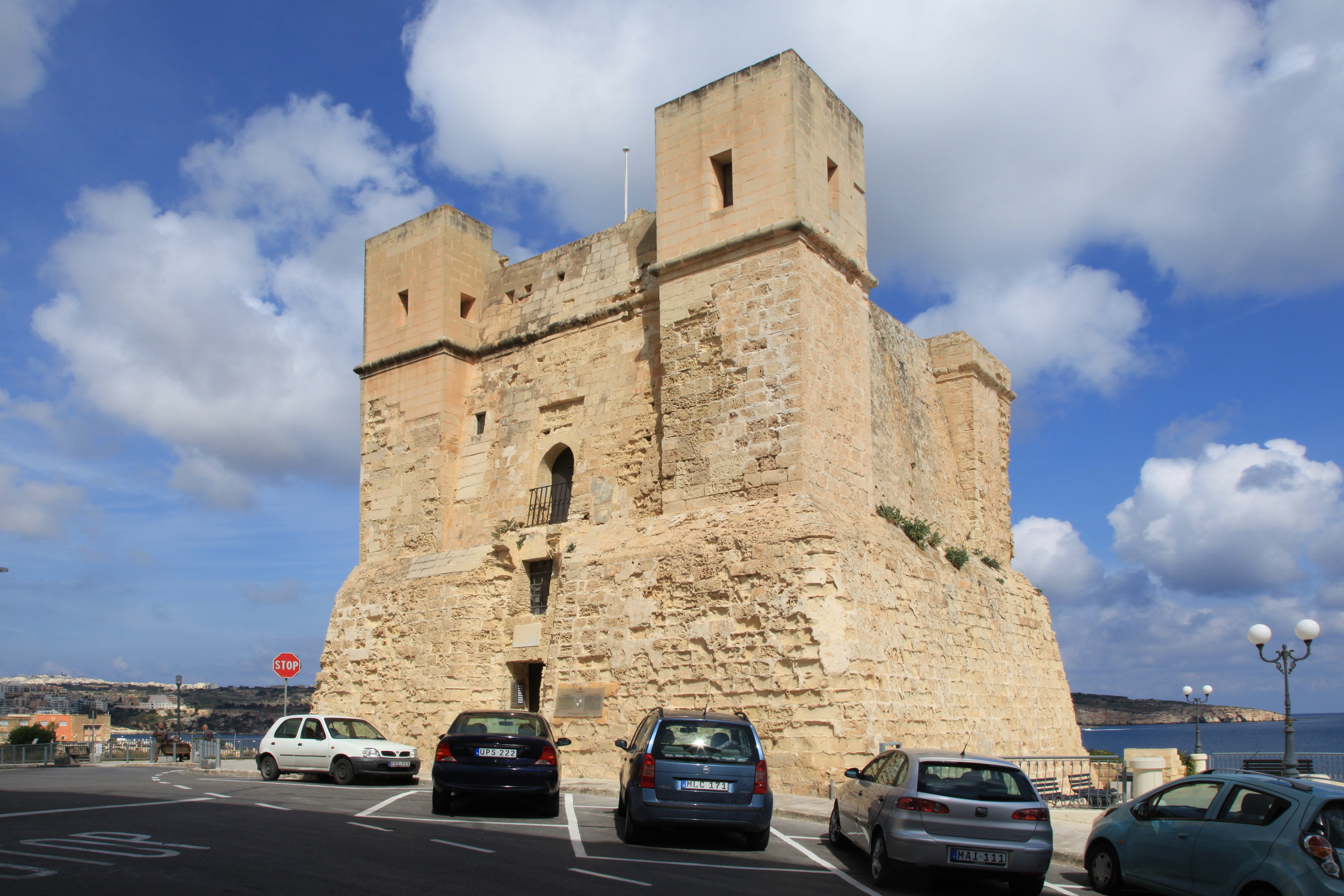
- Wignacourt Tower

Site information
- Type: Bastioned coastal watchtower Artillery battery
- Owner: Government of Malta
- Controlled by: Din l-Art Ħelwa
- Open to the public: Yes
- Condition: Intact

Location
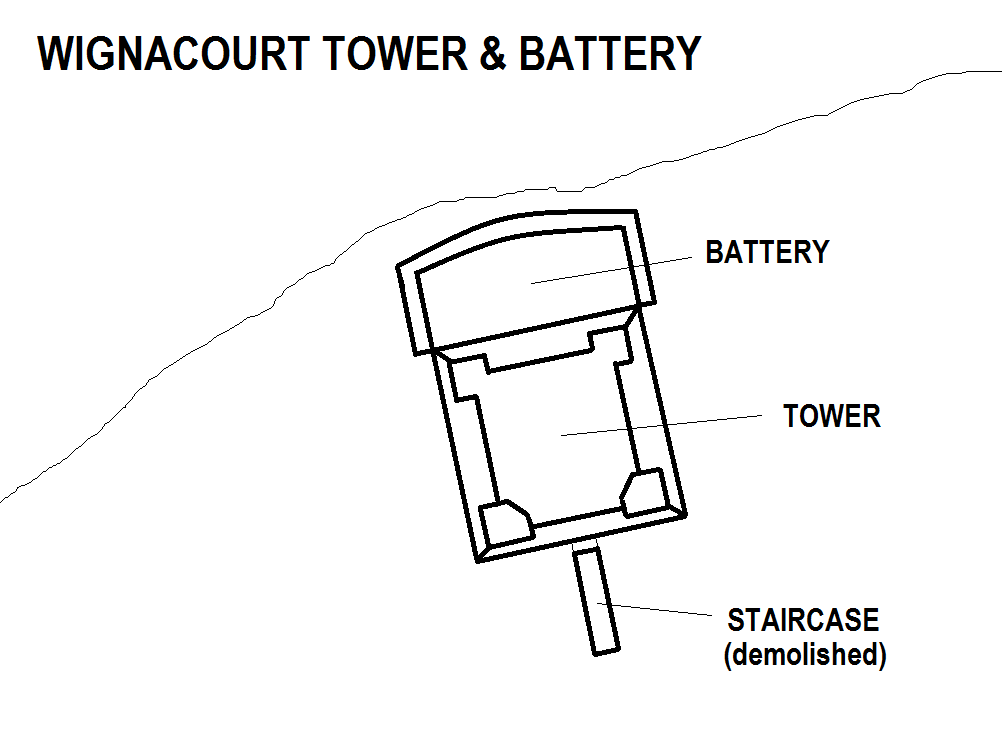
- Map of Wignacourt Tower and its battery
- Coordinates: 35°56′58.72″N 14°24′10.64″E
- Area: 196 m^{2} (2,110 sq ft)

Site history
- Built: 1610 (tower); 1715 (battery)
- Built by: Order of Saint John
- Materials: Limestone

Wignacourt Tower (Maltese: Torri ta' Wignacourt), also known as Saint Paul's Bay Tower (Maltese: Torri ta' San Pawl il-Baħar), is a bastioned watchtower in St. Paul's Bay, Malta. It was the first of six Wignacourt towers to be built, and the first stone was laid on 10 February 1610. It replaced the role of Ta' Tabibu farmhouse which was previously known as Dejma Tower. An artillery battery was added a century later in 1715. Today the tower is a museum of fortifications around the Maltese Islands.

Wignacourt Tower was the second tower to be built in the Maltese islands, after Garzes Tower on Gozo. It was the first tower to be built on the main island. As Garzes Tower was demolished in 1848, Wignacourt Tower is now the oldest surviving watchtower in Malta.

== History ==
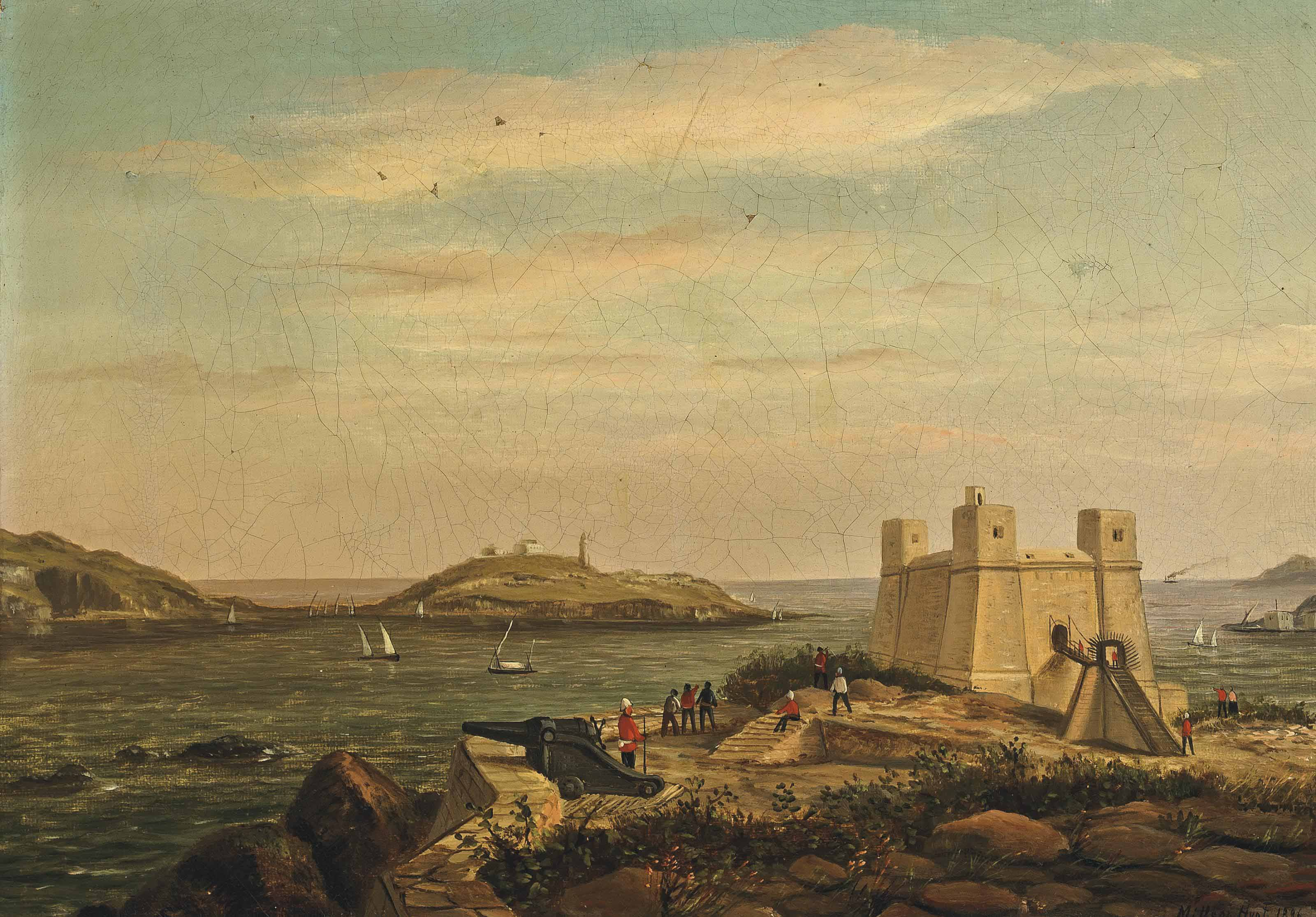
Wignacourt Tower with St Paul's Bay beyond, Malta, by Milson Hunt in 1806

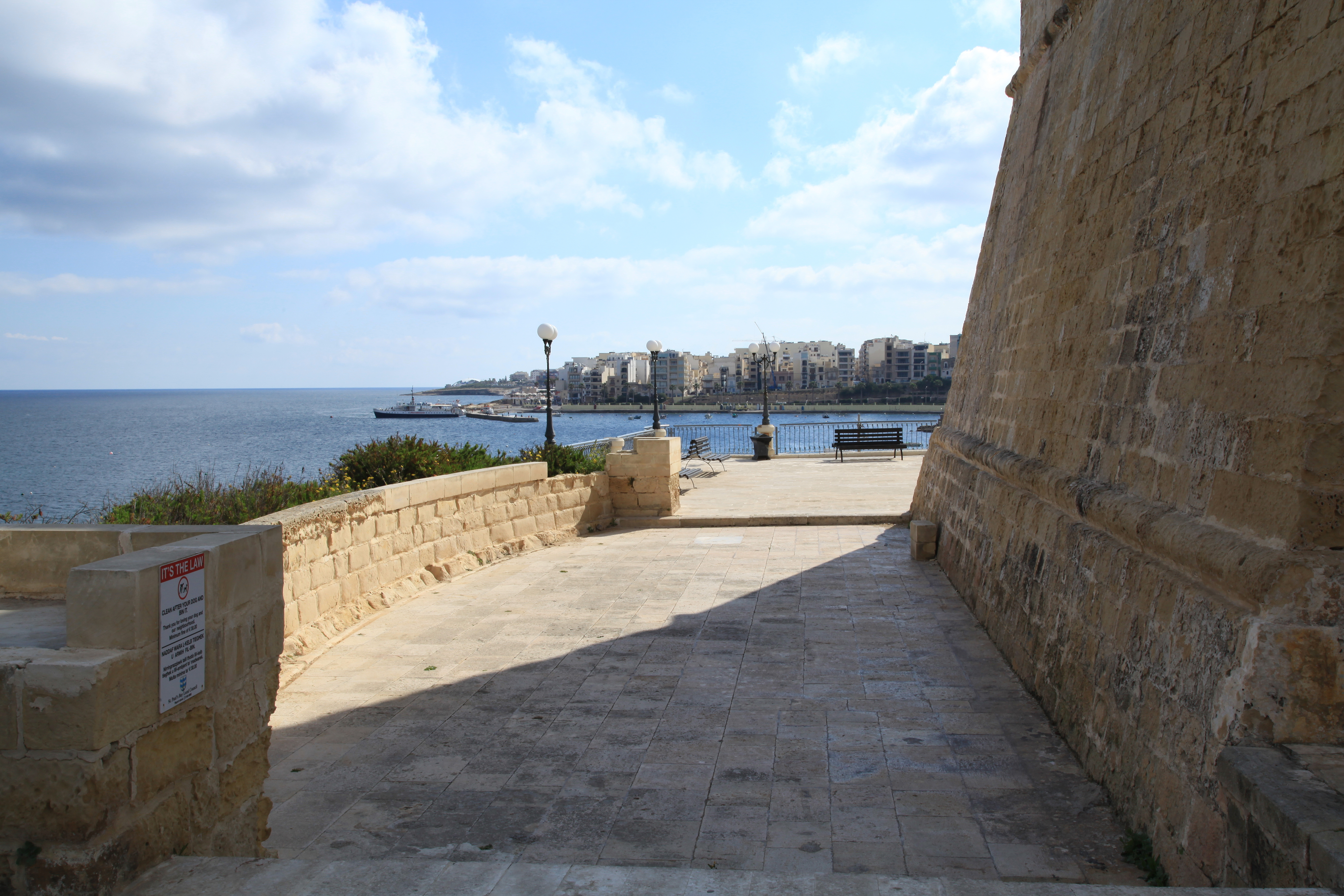
The battery of Wignacourt tower

By the end of the 16th century, Malta's harbour area was extensively fortified. However, the rest of the islands was virtually undefended, and the coastline was open to attacks by Ottomans or Barbary corsairs. This began to change in the early 17th century, when Martin Garzez, Grand Master of the Order of Saint John, allocated funds for the building of Garzes Tower on Gozo. Garzes' successor, Alof de Wignacourt, set out to build a series of towers around the coastline, which were personally funded by him and came to be known as the Wignacourt towers.

The first tower was built to protect St. Paul's Bay, and was called Wignacourt Tower after the Grand Master. On 7 November 1609, plans and a model of the tower were presented to the Order's council. The first stone of was blessed and laid on 10 February 1610, and the accompanying ceremony was attended by Wignacourt himself. The tower cost 6748 scudi, 7 tari and 10 grani to build.

Although there are claims that the tower was designed by Vittorio Cassar, he disappears from the Order's military records around 1603. Cassar died in around June 1609, before work on the tower began. The architect of Wignacourt Tower was probably an unknown Maltese capomastro.

The tower was the only major fortification in the north of Malta until the construction of Saint Agatha's Tower in 1649. It had Qawra Tower (built 1638), Buġibba Battery (built 1715) and Mistra Battery (built 1761) in its line of sight.

A coastal battery was added to the tower in 1715 to house two 18-pounder guns. Buttressing was added to the lower half of the structure in around 1761.

After Malta fell under British rule, the tower began to be used as a police station. A postal agency was located within the police station between 1891 and 1921, and during this period a postmark reading "St. Paul's Bay" was used. The police station closed in 1931, and from 1937 to 1963 the tower was occupied by the Post and Telephone Department.

The tower's original entrance was on the first floor, and it was approached by a drawbridge from a flight of stone steps. The steps were removed in the 1950s when the road in front of the tower was widened. An entrance was added on the ground floor. The wheel of the drawbridge still exists, as well as the door and its key of the main entrance.

== Present day ==
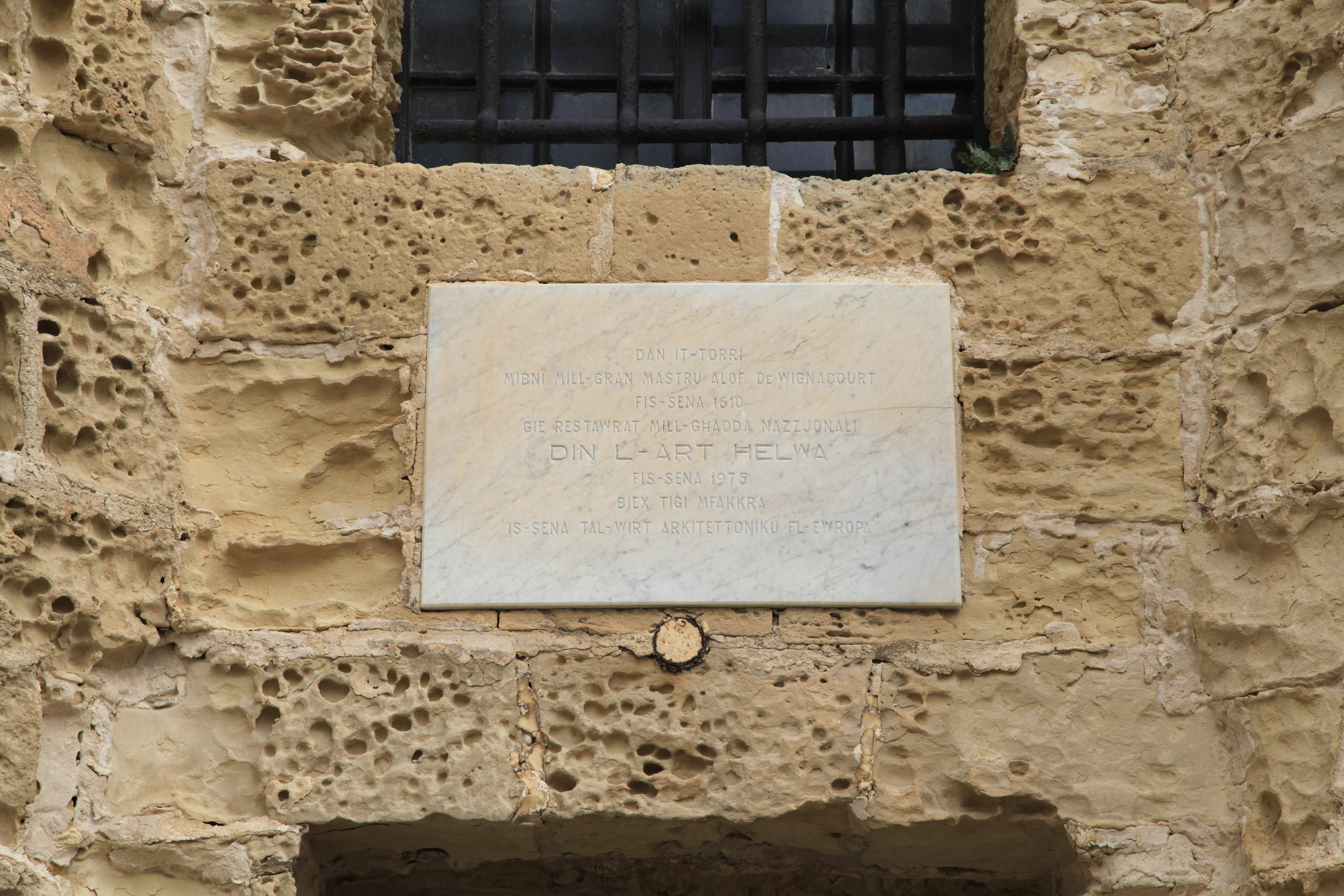
Marble plaque at the tower commemorating its restoration by Din l-Art Ħelwa

In 1967 the government issued a call for tenders for the lease of the tower, and it was leased to Din l-Art Ħelwa in 1970. It was restored between 1973 and 1976. During restoration, the tower's turrets were completely rebuilt. A marble plaque with the following inscription was installed above the ground floor entrance:

DAN IT-TORRI
MIBNI MILL-GRAN MASTRU ALOF DE WIGNACOURT
FIS-SENA 1610
ĠIE RESTAWRAT MILL-GĦAQDA NAZZJONALI
DIN L-ART ĦELWA
FIS-SENA 1975
BIEX TIĠI MFAKKRA
IS-SENA TAL-WIRT ARKITETTONIKU FL-EWROPA

(Translation: This tower, built by Grand Master Alof de Wignacourt in the year 1610, was restored by the National Trust Din l-Art Ħelwa in the year 1975 to commemorate the European Architectural Heritage Year.)

Since 1998, the tower has been a museum, and its exhibits include models of various fortifications found in the Maltese islands, reproductions of items used by the tower's occupants in the 17th and 18th centuries, old photos and a restored cannon.

In 2010, the 400th anniversary of the tower was celebrated by the St. Paul's Bay Local Council, the Festa Committee and Din l-Art Ħelwa in a series of events including re-enactments, tours, discussions and traditional Maltese folklore.

The tower was restored and cleaned once again in 2015.

== In popular culture ==
- The tower was depicted on a postage stamp issued by MaltaPost in 2006.
