= Saint Thomas Tower =

Large bastioned watchtower and battery in Marsaskala, Malta; a Wignacourt tower

Saint Thomas Tower & Battery
- Torri u Batterija ta' San Tumas
- Part of the Wignacourt towers
- Marsaskala, Malta
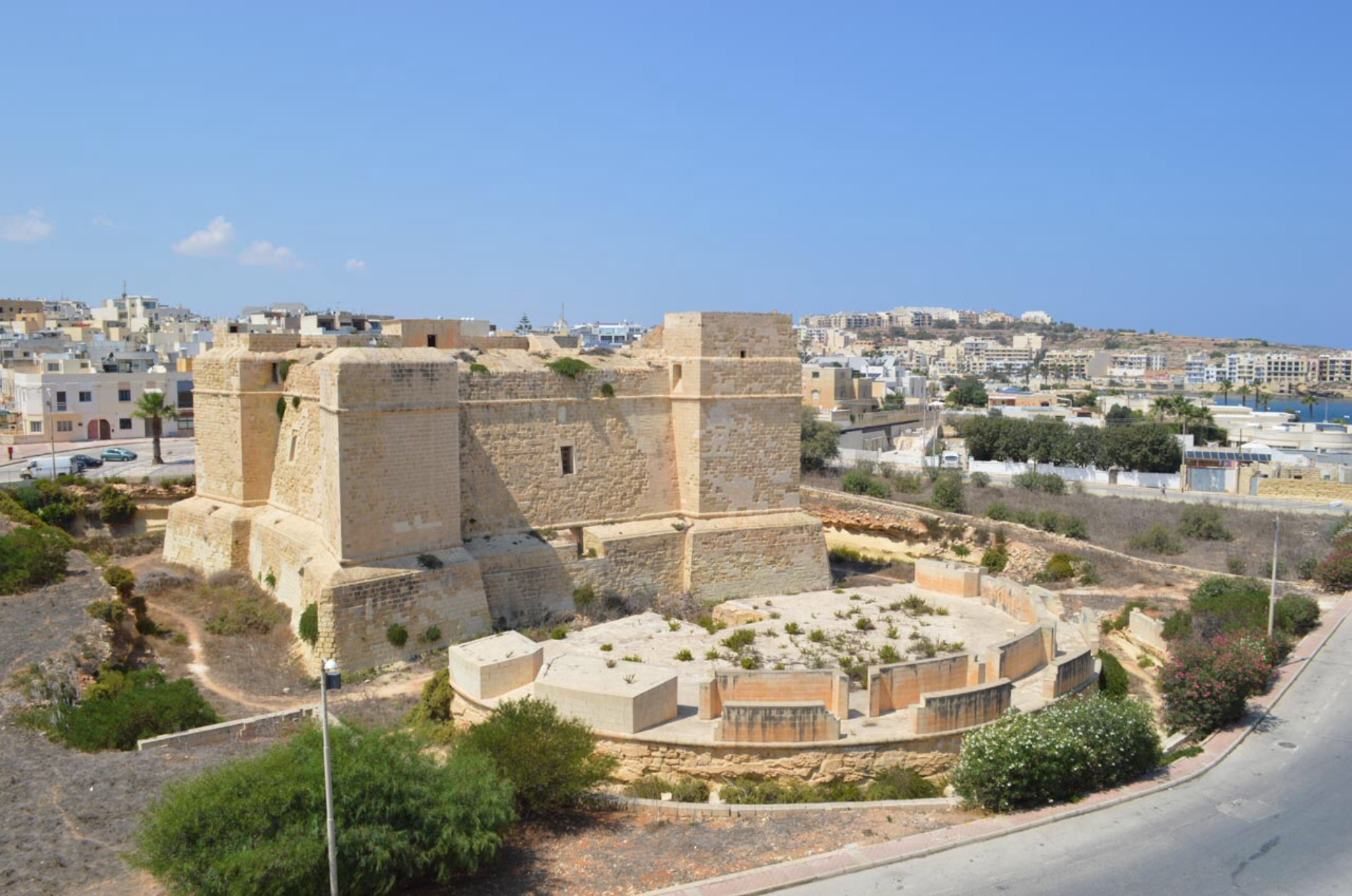
- View of Saint Thomas Tower and its battery

Site information
- Type: Bastioned coastal watchtower Artillery battery
- Owner: Government of Malta
- Controlled by: Fondazzjoni Wirt Artna
- Condition: Intact

Location
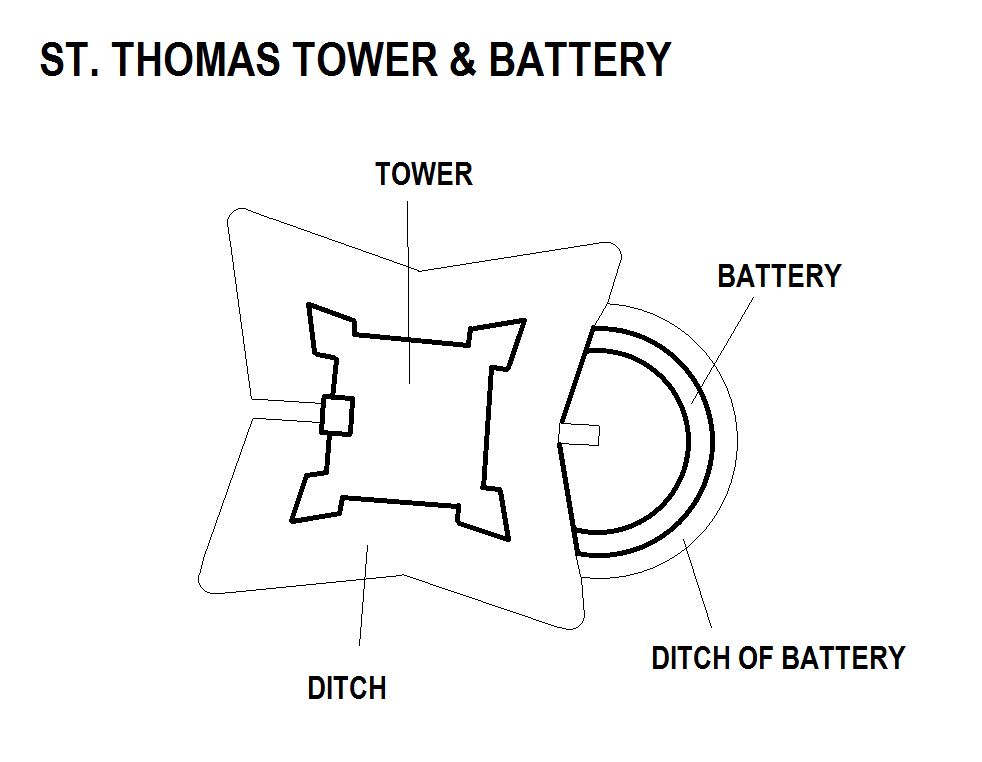
- Map of St. Thomas Tower and its battery
- Coordinates: 35°51′40.3″N 14°34′21″E

Site history
- Built: 1614 (tower); 1715 (battery)
- Built by: Order of Saint John
- In use: 1614–19th century
- Materials: Limestone
- Battles/wars: Siege of Malta (1798–1800)

Saint Thomas Tower (Maltese: Torri ta' San Tumas), also known as Fort Saint Thomas (Maltese: Forti San Tumas), is a large bastioned watchtower in Marsaskala, Malta. It was built in 1614, the third of six Wignacourt towers. An artillery battery was added to the tower in the early 18th century. Saint Thomas Tower holds the record as the largest watchtower in Malta.

== History ==
Saint Thomas Tower was built above the shore on the seaward face of the headland of il-Ħamrija in Marsaskala. It is a substantial fortification intended to prevent the landing of troops in the sheltered anchorages of Marsaskala Creek and St Thomas' Bay. Construction of the tower was approved in July 1614, at the time of the Raid on Żejtun, in which an Ottoman fleet managed to land at St Thomas' Bay. The tower was named after a chapel dedicated to St Thomas, which stood close to where the tower now lies. It cost 13,450 scudi, 6 tarì and 4 grani to build, making it the second most expensive Wignacourt tower, after Saint Mary's Tower.

The tower's architect is unknown. The claims that it was designed by Vittorio Cassar are disputed, since Cassar was probably dead when work on the tower began.

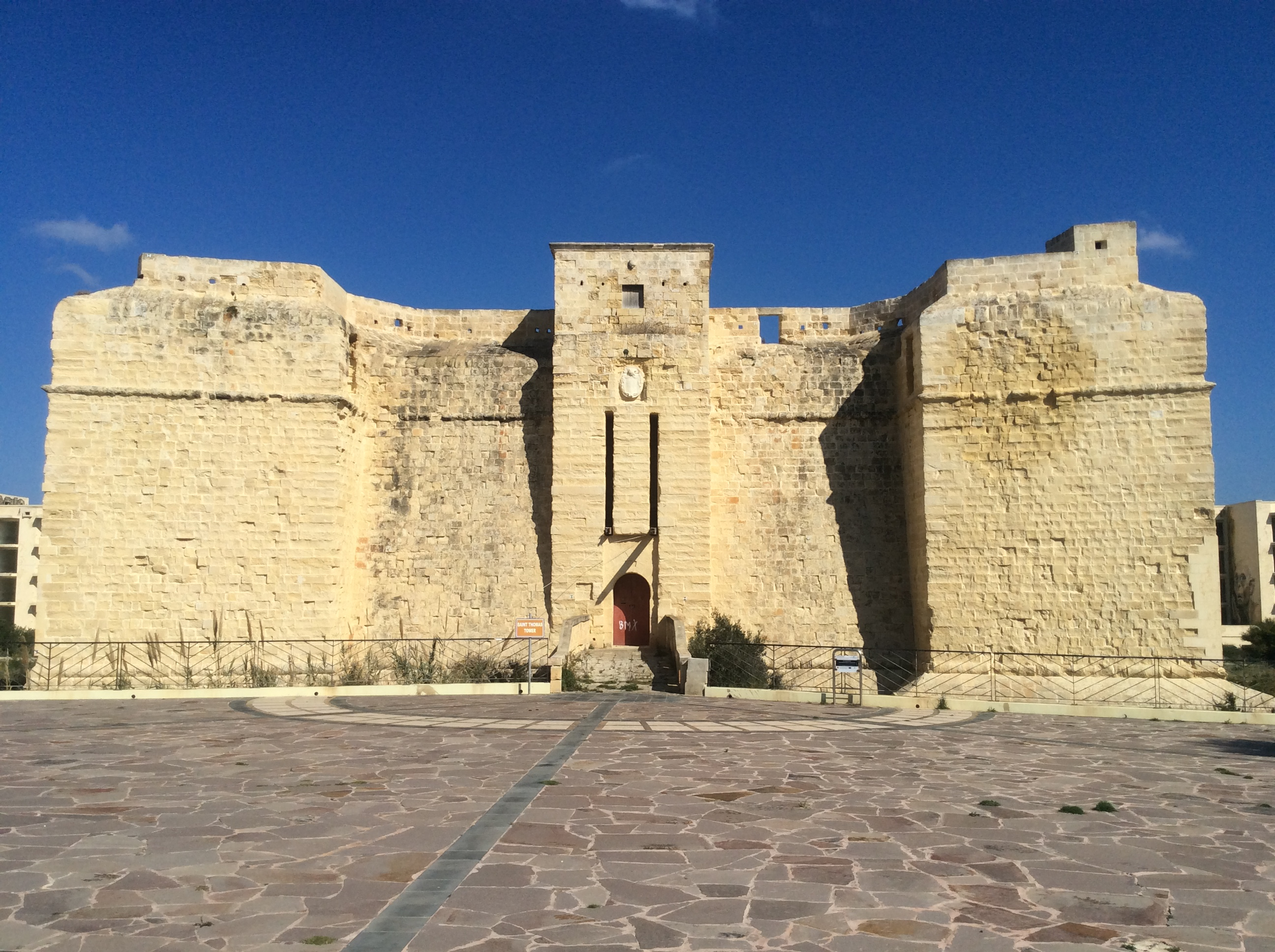
Façade of Saint Thomas Tower

The tower has very thick walls and has four pentagonal bastioned turrets projecting outwards on each corner. Its entrance was through a vaulted doorway with a wooden drawbridge. The drawbridge is still partially intact and it is the only original one to have survived in Malta. The tower is surrounded by a rock-hewn ditch.

After the De Redin towers were built, St Thomas had Żonqor and Xrobb l-Għaġin Towers in its line of sight. Currently, these are now either in ruins or completely demolished.

In 1715, St Thomas Tower was reinforced by the addition of a battery on the seaward face. Construction of the battery cost a total of 382 scudi, 8 tarì, 11 grani and 1 piccolo, which was less than the cost of construction of other batteries around the coast.

During the French blockade of 1798–1800, the tower was stormed and captured by Maltese insurgents.

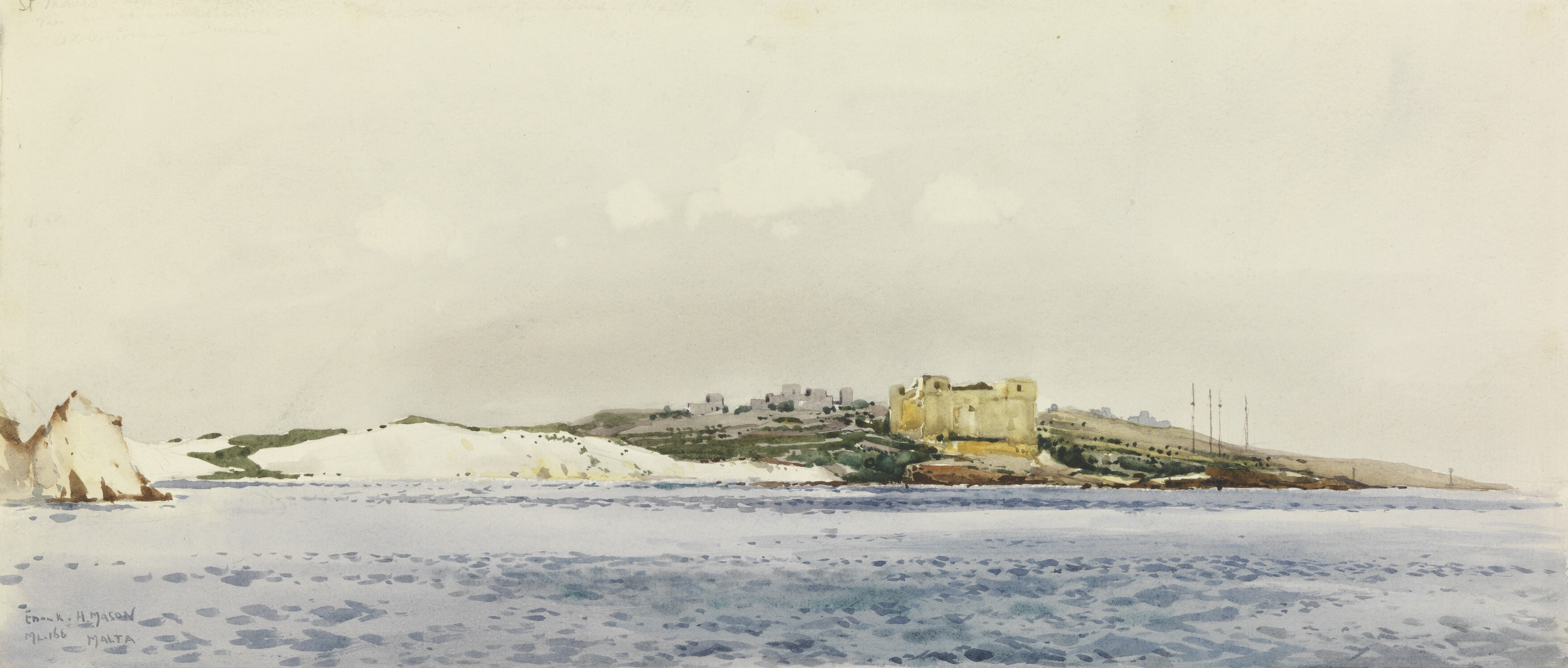
Painting of St Thomas Bay in World War I, viewed from the sea. The tower is visible in the centre.

The tower was used by the British until the 19th century. They did not make any major alterations to the tower (like they did in Saint Lucian Tower), other than some minor changes to the structure. At some point, the tower was also used as a prison.

== Present day ==
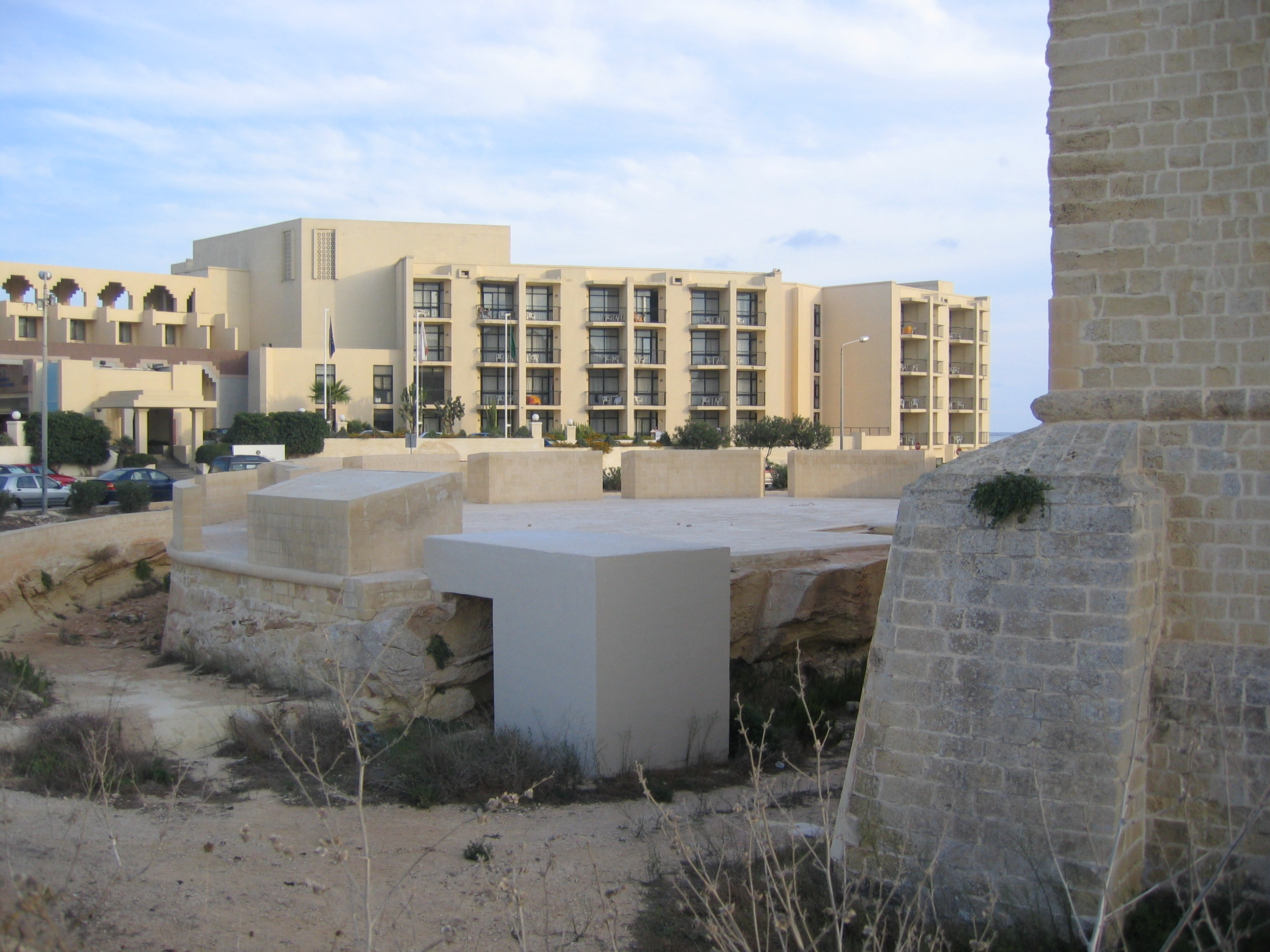
The "restored" battery, with the Jerma Palace Hotel in the background

Today, the town of Marsaskala has expanded, surrounding the tower with modern buildings. In 1982, the four-star Corinthia Jerma Palace Hotel was built between the tower and the coast, effectively ruining the tower's relation with the sea. The hotel closed in 2007, and is now in a dilapidated state.

Meanwhile, the tower itself now forms the centerpiece of a plaza around its shoreward face. For some time, it was used as a restaurant and pizzeria. In 2008, it was handed over to Fondazzjoni Wirt Artna, a heritage foundation. A couple of weeks after it was handed over, the tower was cleaned of debris, and some modern structures which had been added when it was a restaurant were removed. Further restoration work was undertaken by the Restoration Unit. Plans were made to open the tower as a museum about piracy in the Mediterranean, but it has not opened yet.

The battery's gun platform was also restored, and its parapet and embrasures were rebuilt to a design based on modern interpretative lines.

In 2014, the Marsaskala Local Council organized exhibitions, re-enactments and other events in the tower to commemorate its 400th anniversary.

Fondazzjoni Wirt Artna opened the site in 2025 and now operates as a museum focused on Piracy and Corsairing in Malta.

== In popular culture ==
- The tower is featured in the fiction book Il-Misteru tat-Torri San Tumas (The Mystery of Saint Thomas Tower) by Charles Zarb published in 2004.
