= Santa Maria delle Grazie Tower =

Former watchtower in Xgħajra, Malta; a Wignacourt tower

- Torri ta' Santa Marija tal-Grazzja
- Part of the Wignacourt towers
- Xgħajra, Malta
- Heraldic representation of the tower on the flag of Xgħajra

Site information
- Type: Bastioned coastal watchtower

Location
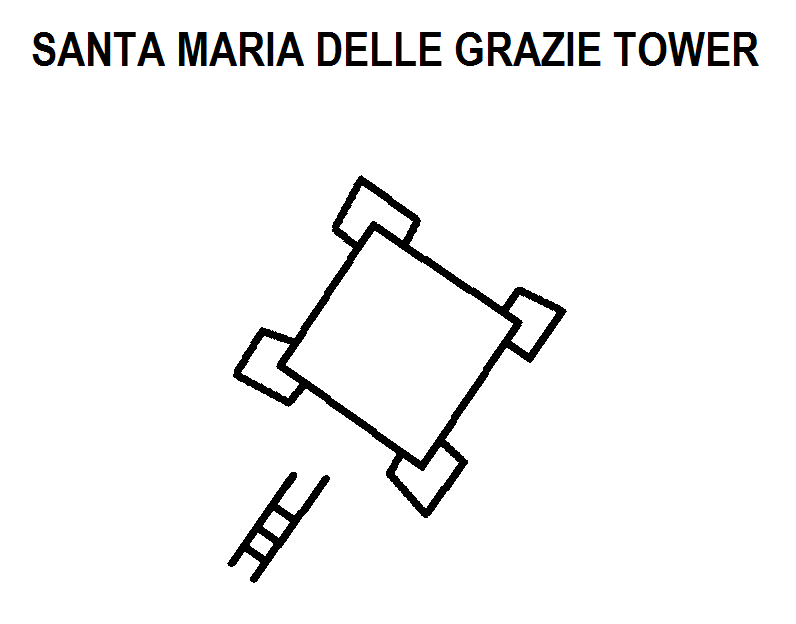
- Plan of the tower as depicted on a c. 1761 map
- Coordinates: 35°53′11.2″N 14°32′59″E

Site history
- Built: 1620
- Built by: Order of Saint John
- Materials: Limestone
- Fate: Demolished, c. 1888

Santa Maria delle Grazie Tower (Maltese: Torri ta' Santa Marija tal-Grazzja), also known as Delle Grazie Tower (Maltese: Torri tal-Grazzja), Madonna delle Gratie Tower (Maltese: Torri tal-Madonna tal-Grazzja) or Blata Bajda Tower (Maltese: Torri tal-Blata l-Bajda), was a watchtower in what is now Xgħajra, Malta. It was constructed in 1620, and was the last of six Wignacourt towers to be built. The tower was demolished in the late 19th century by the British military.

== History ==
Santa Maria delle Grazie Tower was built above the shore to the east of Grand Harbour, close to the present day town of Xgħajra, on or near the site of a medieval watch post. It was the last of the six Wignacourt towers to be built. The stone laying ceremony of the tower took place in April 1620, and it was built on land belonging to Giorgio Mamo, who later built the Mamo Tower.

Santa Maria delle Grazie Tower only cost 4948 scudi to build, which was less than the cost of the other towers. This implies that it was smaller, however, it was the most heavily armed of the towers. Some weapons were therefore possibly deployed outside the tower (even though it had no external battery like some of the other towers).

The exact shape of the tower is unknown, as no detailed plans, paintings or photographs of it are known. However, it is shown in a 1761 map as having four corner bastions and a flight of steps leading to the main entrance, so its overall design was possibly similar to the towers of St. Paul's Bay, St. Lucian and St. Mary, although on a smaller scale. Within it was a chapel dedicated to the Madonna delle Grazie.

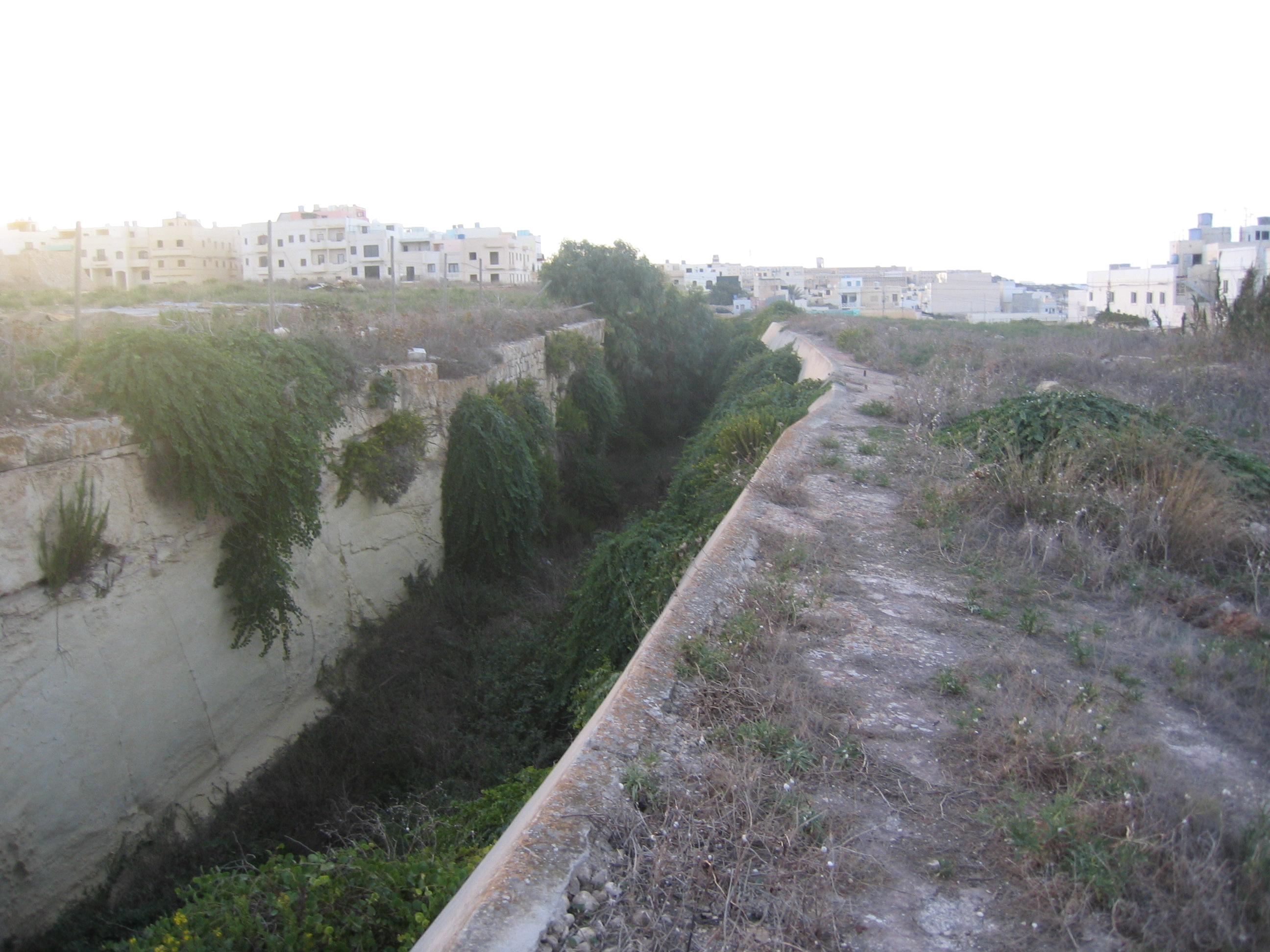
Forward ditch and glacis of Della Grazie Battery. The tower was located to the right of this photo.

In 1799, during the French blockade, San Rocco Redoubt was built in the vicinity of the tower to provide cover in the case British troops had to retreat from Malta.

The tower's condition in the nineteenth century is not known. The tower (or its ruins) was demolished by the British military in around 1888 to clear the line of fire of Della Grazie Battery, a new artillery battery which was named after the tower. Nineteenth-century maps show that the site of the tower became part of the battery's glacis.

Today, no remains of the original tower survive. A street in Xgħajra is named after it - Triq it-Torri ta' Alof de Wignacourt (Alof de Wignacourt Tower Street). A heraldic representation of a Wignacourt tower is also featured on the flag and coat of arms of Xgħajra. Since Santa Maria delle Grazie Tower's design is not known, the representation seems to be based on the St. Paul's Bay Tower.
