= Garzes Tower =

- Torri Garzes
- Mġarr, Gozo
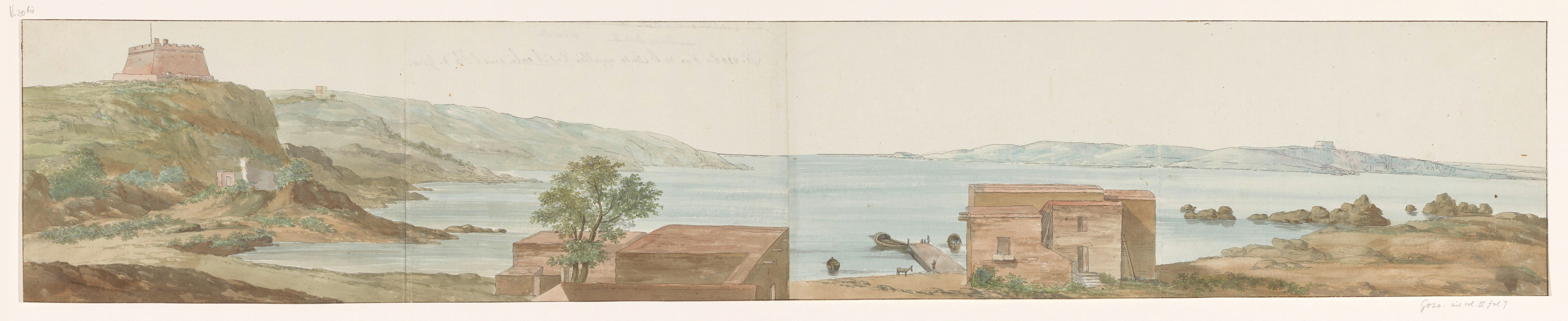
- Garzes Tower (top left) on a panorama by Abraham-Louis-Rodolphe Ducros, 1778

Site information
- Type: Coastal watchtower

Location
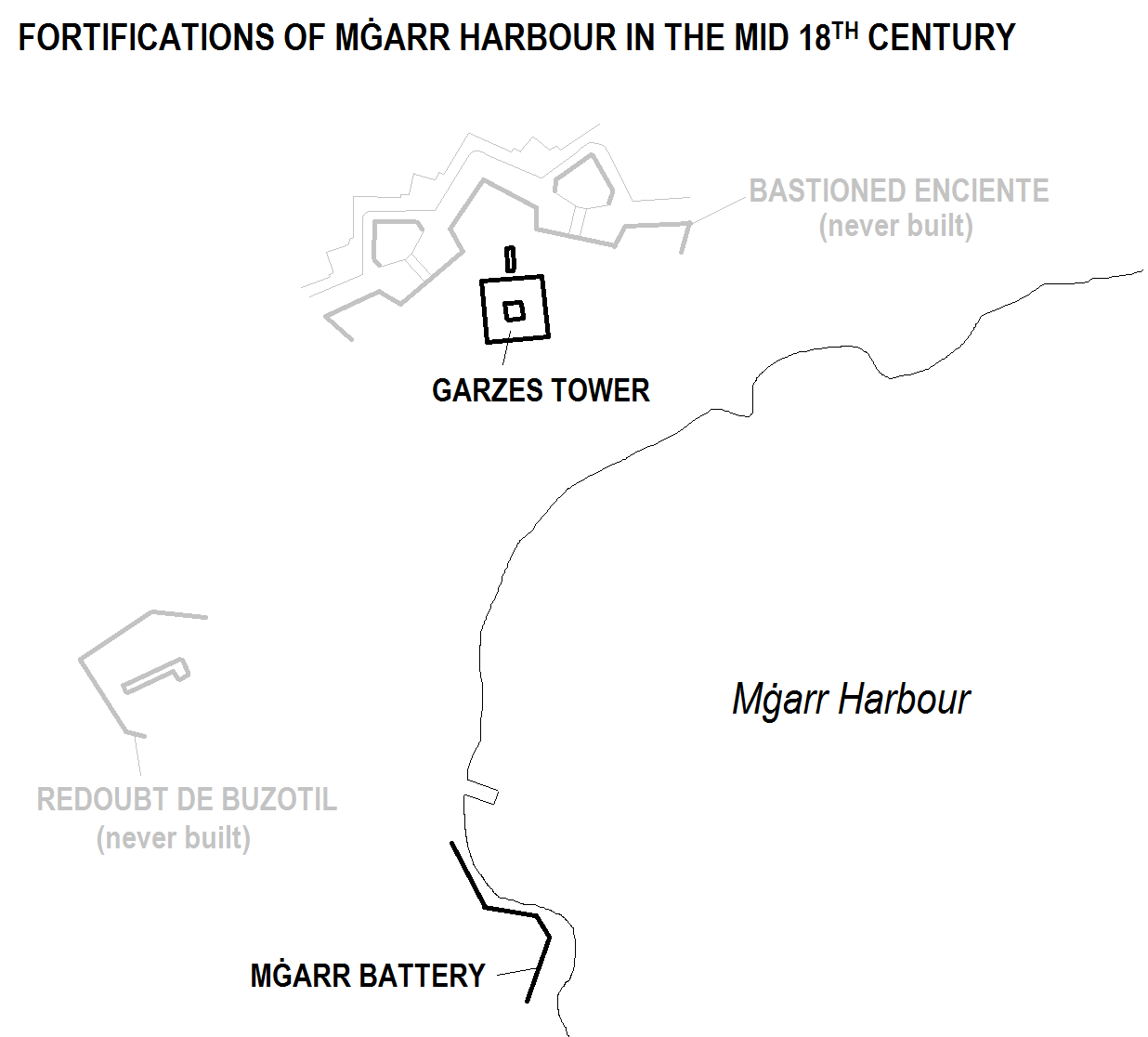
- Map of Mġarr Harbour in the mid-18th century, showing Garzes Tower, Mġarr Battery and a proposed bastioned enceinte and redoubt that were never built
- Coordinates: 36°1′37.7″N 14°17′51.7″E

Site history
- Built: 1605–1607
- Built by: Order of Saint John
- Materials: Limestone
- Fate: Demolished, 1848

Garzes Tower (Maltese: Torri Garzes, Italian: Torre Garzes or Torre della Garza), also known as Saint Martin's Tower (Maltese: Torri ta' San Martin), was a watchtower built in Mġarr, Gozo by the Order of Saint John in 1605. It was named after Martin Garzez, the Grand Master who financed its construction, even though it was eventually built after his death during the Magistry of Alof de Wignacourt. The tower was demolished in the 19th century; some remains were reused for the building of a bridge, and the site was developed with a hotel.

It was built to the design of Vittorio Cassar. A number coastal towers, built by Grandmaster Wignacourt, are traditionally attributed to Cassar and based on the Garzes tower. However, this is probably based on speculation; it is likely that Cassar's design of Garzes Tower was used, and adequately modified, to build the other towers due to the similarity in their military architecture.

== Background ==
In the fifteenth to seventeenth centuries, Gozo was prone to attacks by Barbary corsairs, along with most of Malta and other coastal areas in the Mediterranean and Europe. The harbour of Mġarr was commonly used by pirates to replenish with water and plunder the surrounding area. The worst attack occurred in July 1551, when Ottoman forces aided by corsairs tried to take over Malta but failed so they landed in Gozo, besieged the Cittadella and took almost the entire population of about 5,000 to 6,000 people as slaves (with the exception of a monk, some 40 elderly Gozitans and about 300 who managed to escape and hide). The slaves were taken aboard Ottoman ships from Mġarr Harbour itself.

Before this attack, there had already been proposals to build a tower to guard Mġarr Harbour and the Gozo Channel. In 1418, the people made a petition to build such a tower but nothing materialized. In 1599, a report was made about the defence of Gozo, and the military engineer Giovanni Rinaldini made it clear that a tower was necessary in that area to prevent future attacks. The Grand Master at that time, Martin Garzez, realized this so he decided to finance the building of a tower himself. He allocated 12,000 scudi for the building of the tower, but he died in 1601 before construction began.

== The tower ==
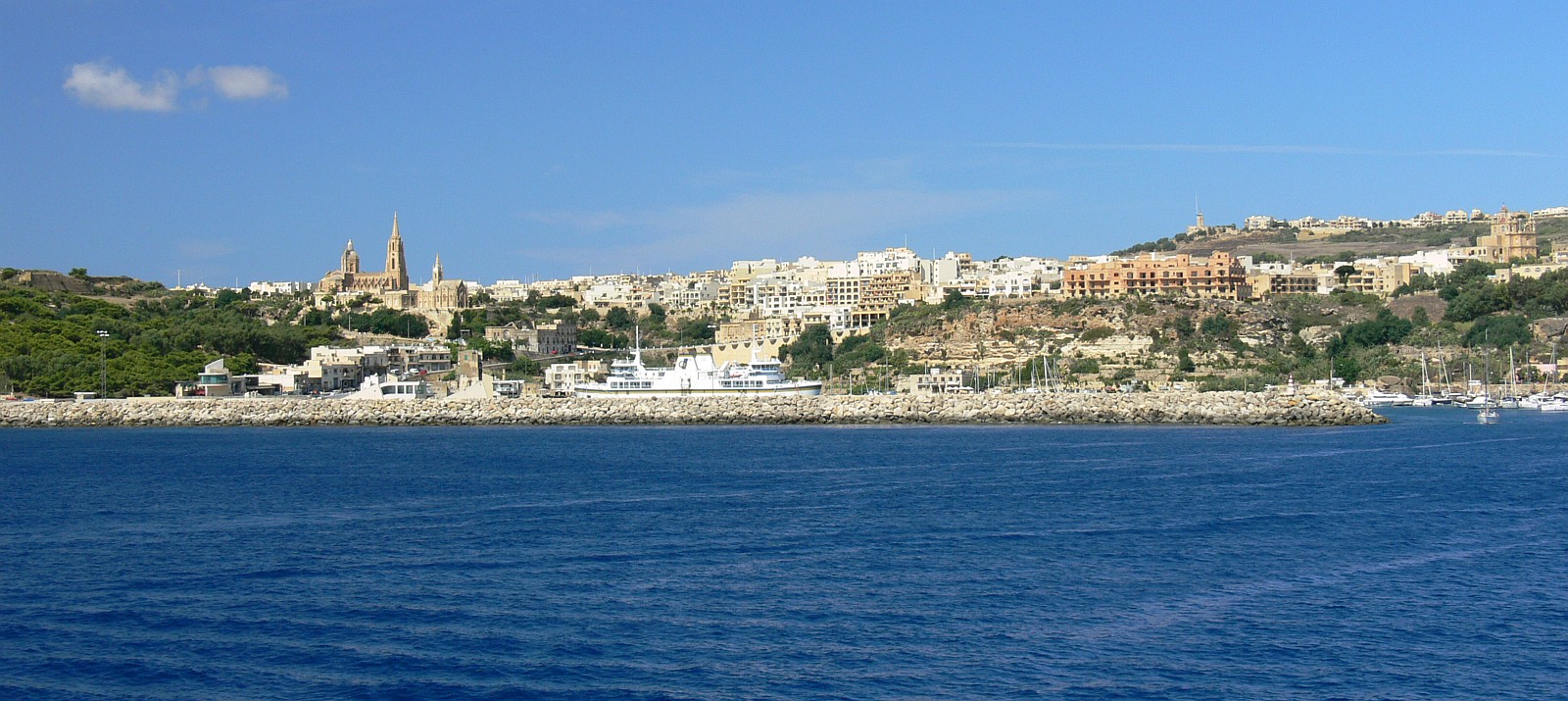
View of Mġarr from the sea, with the site of Garzes Tower on the right

Construction of the tower began four years after the Grand Master died, in 1605. It was still under construction in 1607. It was built on a promontory, between Wied il-Kbir and Wied Biljun. The tower had a number of guns mounted on its roof which had equidistant embrasures along each of its sides.

In the mid-18th century, a bastioned enceinte around the tower was proposed but never built. Eventually, Fort Chambray was built on the opposite side of Mġarr.

The tower had a small chapel dedicated to St. Catherine of Siena and later St. Martin that was intended for use by the four militia members in the tower but was also open to the public. It became an unofficial parish church for the people of the nearby villages.

After 243 years, the tower was demolished in 1848. Its masonry was used to build the bridge linking Mġarr to Nadur. The Mġarr Hotel was built over the site of the tower, but it has since closed down.
