= Wignacourt towers =

Series of coastal watchtowers built in Malta 1610-1620

- Various locations in Malta and Gozo

Site information
- Type: Coastal watchtowers
- Condition: 4 survived 2 destroyed

Site history
- Built: 1610–1620
- Built by: Order of Saint John
- In use: 1610–2002
- Materials: Limestone
- Battles/wars: Raid of Żejtun (1614); Capture of Malta (1798); Siege of Malta (1798–1800)

The Wignacourt towers (Maltese: Torrijiet ta' Wignacourt) are a series of large coastal watchtowers built in Malta by the Order of Saint John between 1610 and 1620. A total of six towers of this type were constructed, four of which survive.

== Background, construction and history ==
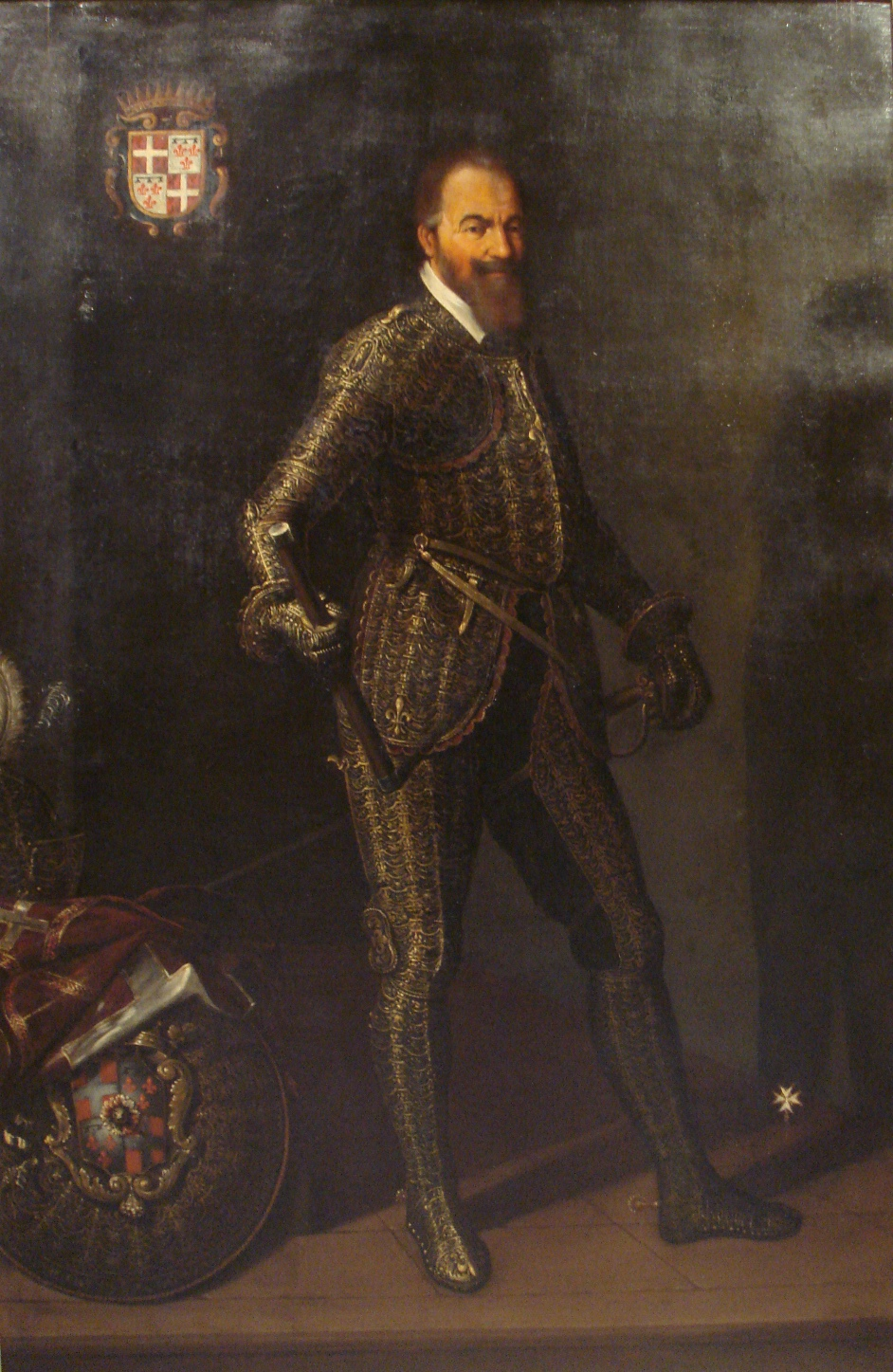
Official portrait of Alof de Wignacourt

In 1418, the Maltese people made a petition to build a tower guarding the Gozo Channel, but nothing materialised. In the early 15th century, the local Mahras maintained several watch posts around the islands' coastline, and some of the posts possibly had a coastal watchtower. Despite this, there was a shortage of men and coastal defence was not very effective, with the islands remaining open to attacks by Moors or Barbary corsairs.

The Maltese islands fell under the control of the Order of Saint John in 1530. The Order initially established its base in Birgu, and later moved to Valletta. Both cities are located in the Grand Harbour, the main natural harbour in Malta. By the end of the 16th century, the harbour area was extensively fortified, but nothing had been done to improve the coastal defences.

In 1598, a fleet of 40 Ottoman ships was sighted off Capo Passaro in Sicily. This led to efforts to build new coastal defences. In 1599, Grand Master Martin Garzez invited the military engineer Giovanni Rinaldini to examine the defences and suggest improvements. Garzez died in 1601 before any new defences were built, but he left a sum of 12,000 scudi in his will for building a new coastal watchtower. In 1605, construction of Garzes Tower began in Mġarr, Gozo. The tower was completed sometime after 1607.

Garzez's successor, Alof de Wignacourt, set out to build a series of towers around the coastline. The first of these, called Wignacourt Tower after the Grand Master, was proposed in 1609 and the first stone was laid on 10 February 1610. Five other towers were built over a ten-year period until 1620. The construction of five of the six towers was funded personally by Wignacourt, amounting to a total cost of 55,519 scudi. This amounted to one eighth of the Grand Master's total benefactions to the Order. The only tower which was not financed by Wignacourt was Marsalforn Tower on Gozo, which was financed directly by the Order. It was considerably smaller than the other towers, and did not have any bastions.

Saint Lucian Tower first saw action in the raid of Żejtun of 1614, when it prevented an Ottoman force from landing in Marsaxlokk. In around 1715, as part of a programme to improve Malta's coastal defences, artillery batteries were built around three of the towers. Saint Lucian Tower was strengthened and renamed Fort Rohan in the 1790s, and saw use during the French capture of Malta and subsequent Maltese rebellion. The tower was turned into a polygonal fort by the British in the 1870s, and it was renamed Fort San Lucian.

The Wignacourt towers remained in use for coastal defence until the early years of British rule. They were all decommissioned during the course of the 19th century, and were later used for a number of purposes, including as police stations, post offices, isolation hospitals and stables. In the late 1880s, Santa Maria delle Grazie Tower was demolished. Some of the towers were also used in World War I or World War II.

All four surviving towers have been restored since the 1970s. Saint Mary's Tower on Comino was used by the Armed Forces of Malta as a lookout post until 2002.

== The towers ==
Name	Image	Location	Built	Status
Wignacourt Tower		St. Paul's Bay	1609	Intact (without original staircase)
Saint Lucian Tower		Marsaxlokk	1610–1611	Intact (without original staircase)
Saint Thomas Tower		Marsaskala	1614	Intact
Marsalforn Tower		Xagħra	c.1614–1616	Collapsed 1716, some ruins remain
Saint Mary's Tower		Comino	1618	Intact (without musketry gallery)
Santa Maria delle Grazie Tower		Xgħajra	1620	Demolished c.1888

Wignacourt towers

== Architecture ==
Unlike the later Lascaris and De Redin towers, the Wignacourt towers were more than simply watchtowers. They formed significant strongpoints intended to protect vulnerable sections of the coast from attack. Coastal batteries were later added to three of the towers and they were also sometimes regarded as forts.

=== Bastions ===
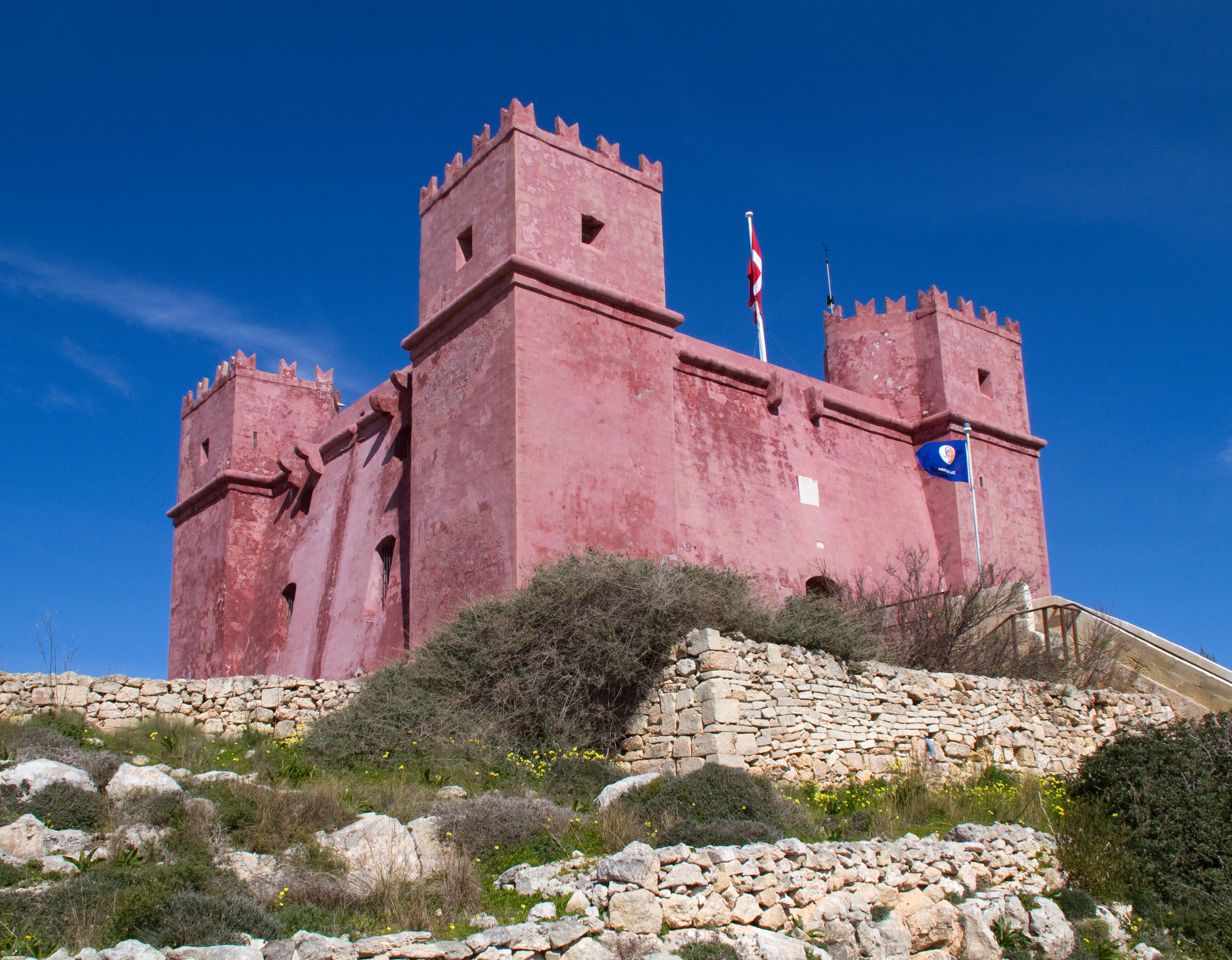
Saint Agatha's Tower, a Lascaris tower with bastioned turrets similar to the Wignacourt towers

A distinctive feature typical of the Wignacourt towers is the corner bastioned turrets. The feature can be found in all four surviving towers, and although the exact design of the demolished Santa Maria delle Grazie Tower is not known, it possibly also had bastions. On the other hand, Marsalforn Tower did not have any bastions and its design differed significantly from the other towers.

The concept of bastioned towers was developed in Spain in the late 16th century. One of the earliest known bastioned towers is the Torre de San Giovanni in the Ebro Delta, which was built in 1576 and today lies in ruins. Other bastioned towers were built in Sicily, Mallorca and Cuba, such as Torreón de la Chorrera.

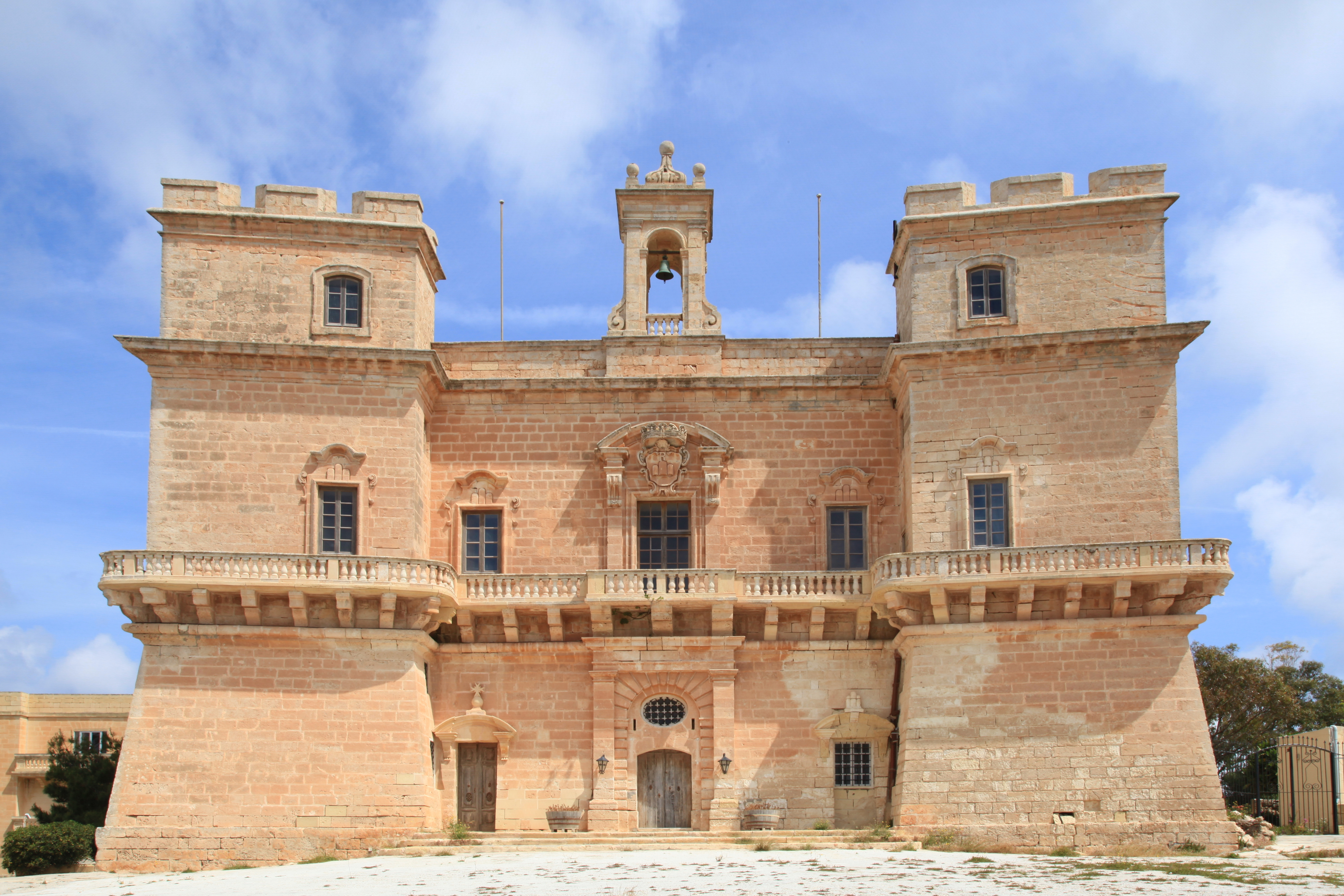
Selmun Palace, whose design was influenced by the Wignacourt towers

Thirty years after the construction of the last Wignacourt tower, another bastioned tower was built in Malta – Saint Agatha's Tower in Mellieħa. This was built during the reign of Giovanni Paolo Lascaris, and it is therefore considered to be one of the Lascaris towers.

In the late 18th century, Selmun Palace was built in Selmun, limits of Mellieħa. The palace was not intended for military purposes, but its design was influenced by the Wignacourt towers. It has bastion-like turrets and fake embrasures, which were built for aesthetic purposes. They also served as a deterrent for corsairs looking for a potential landing spot, since the structure looked like a military outpost especially when viewed from the sea.

Today, Wignacourt towers are considered to be among the best examples of surviving bastioned towers around the world.

=== Other features ===
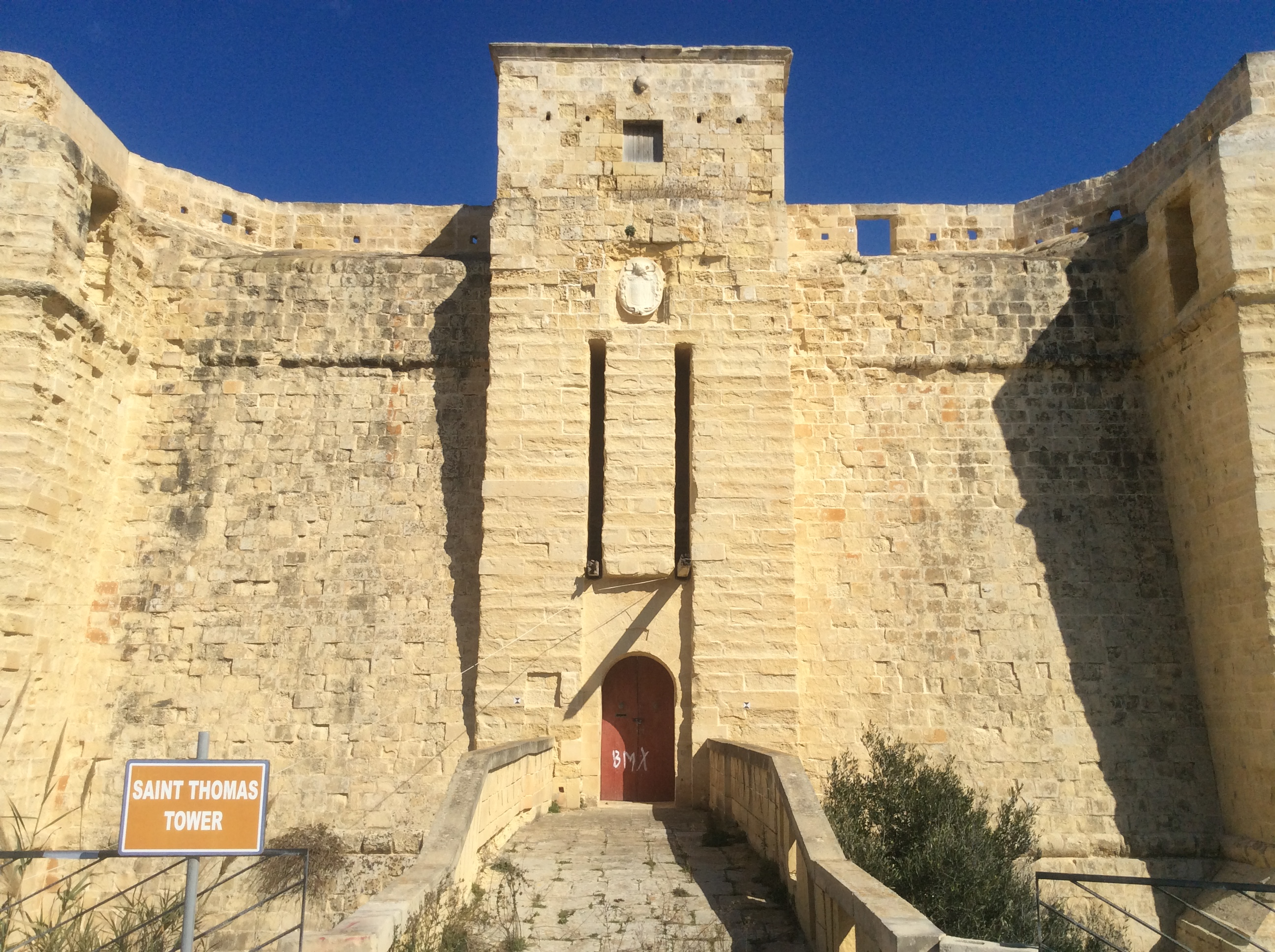
Façade of Saint Thomas Tower with the defaced escutcheon and drawbridge visible

Every tower originally had an escutcheon with the coat of arms of Wignacourt. The escutcheon of the first Wignacourt Tower is missing, while that of St Lucian Tower was replaced by the coat of arms of de Rohan in the 1790s. The escutcheons of St Thomas and St Mary's Towers still exist, although the one at the façade of St Thomas Tower has been defaced.

The towers also had musketry loopholes, parapets and machicolations. Each tower was accessed by a drawbridge. The one at St Thomas Tower is still partially intact and it is the only original one to have survived in Malta.
