= Martín Garzés =

Spanish Knight (1526 - 1601)

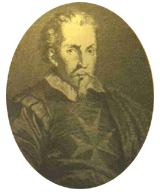

Grand Master of the Order of Saint John
- In office 8 May 1595 – 7 February 1601
- Monarchs: King Philip I King Philip II
- Preceded by: Hugues Loubenx de Verdalle
- Succeeded by: Alof de Wignacourt

Personal details
- Born: 1525
- Died: 7 February 1601 (aged 74–75) Malta
- Resting place: St. John's Co-Cathedral

Military service
- Allegiance: (Sovereign Military Order of Malta) Order of Saint John

Fra Martín Garzés (circa 1525 − 7 February 1601) was a Spanish knight of Aragon who served as the 53rd Grand Master of the Order of Malta, between 1595 and 1601. He became the Grand Master of the Order after the death of Hugues Loubenx de Verdalle. His suit of armour is found in the Palace Armoury at Valletta.

== Biography ==
Garzés was born around 1525.

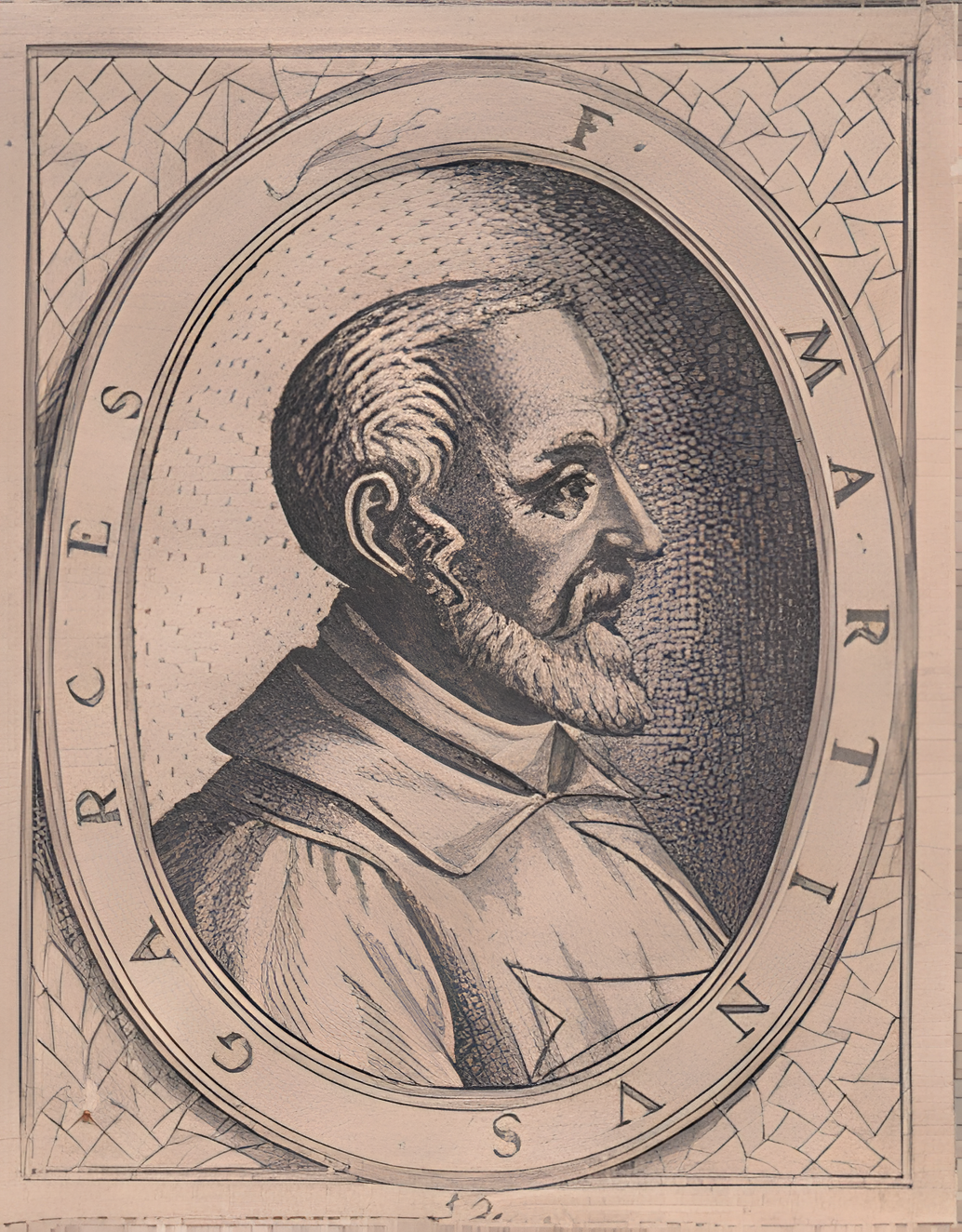
Portrait of Garzés, circa 1643.

Preceded by Hugues Loubenx de Verdalle	Grand Master of the Knights Hospitaller; 1595–1601	Succeeded by Alof de Wignacourt
