= Alof de Wignacourt =

French nobleman (1547–1622)

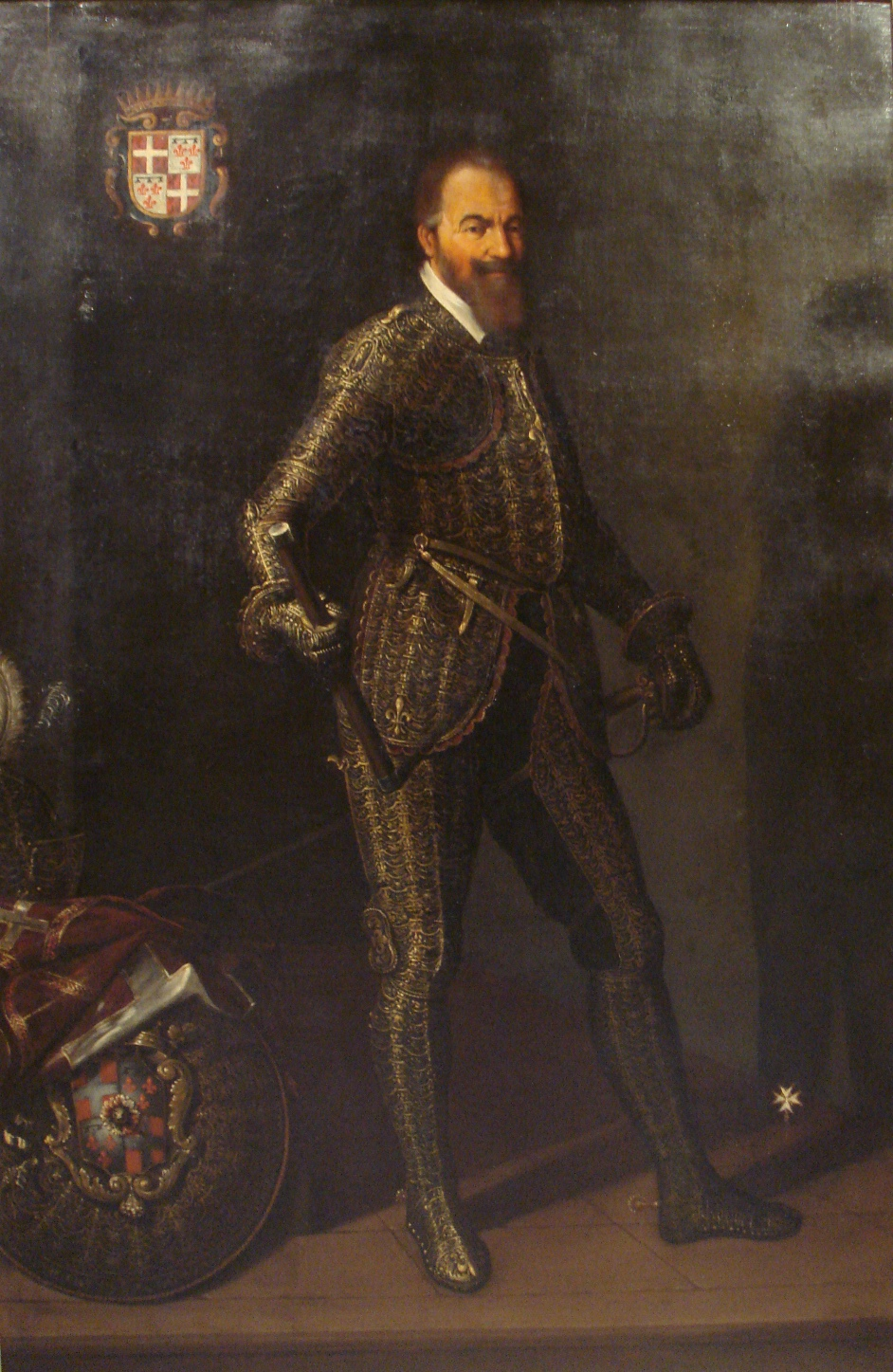
- Official portrait of Wignacourt

Grand Master of the Order of Saint John
- In office 10 February 1601 – 14 September 1622
- Monarchs: King Philip II; King Philip III
- Preceded by: Martin Garzez
- Succeeded by: Luís Mendes de Vasconcellos

Personal details
- Born: 1547 Flanders
- Died: 14 September 1622 (aged 74–75) Malta
- Resting place: St. John's Co-Cathedral

Military service
- Allegiance: (Sovereign Military Order of Malta) Order of Saint John
- Years of service: 1564–1622
- Rank: Grand Master
- Battles/wars: Great Siege of Malta; Raid of Żejtun

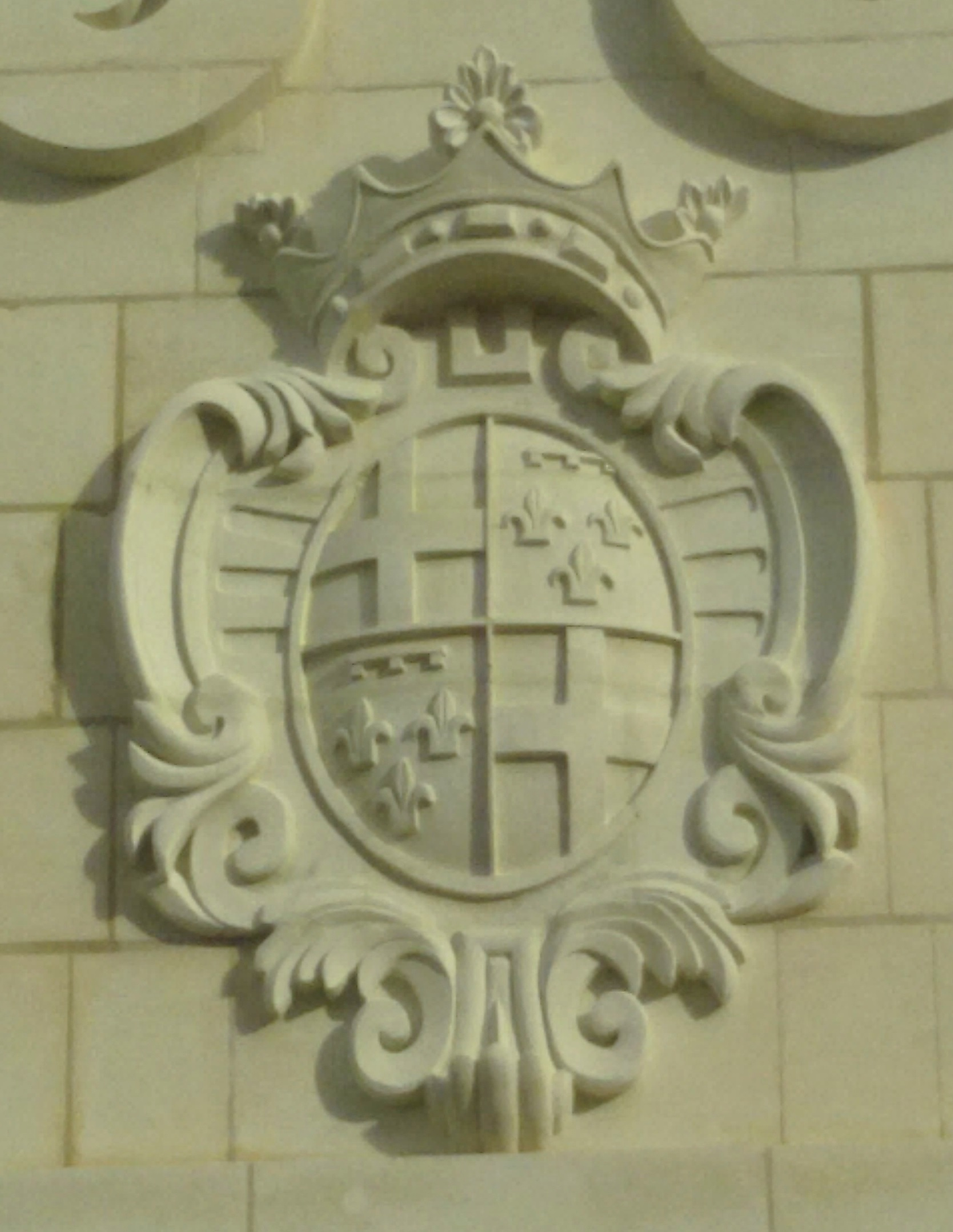
Coat of arms of Wignacourt on the reconstructed Wignacourt Arch

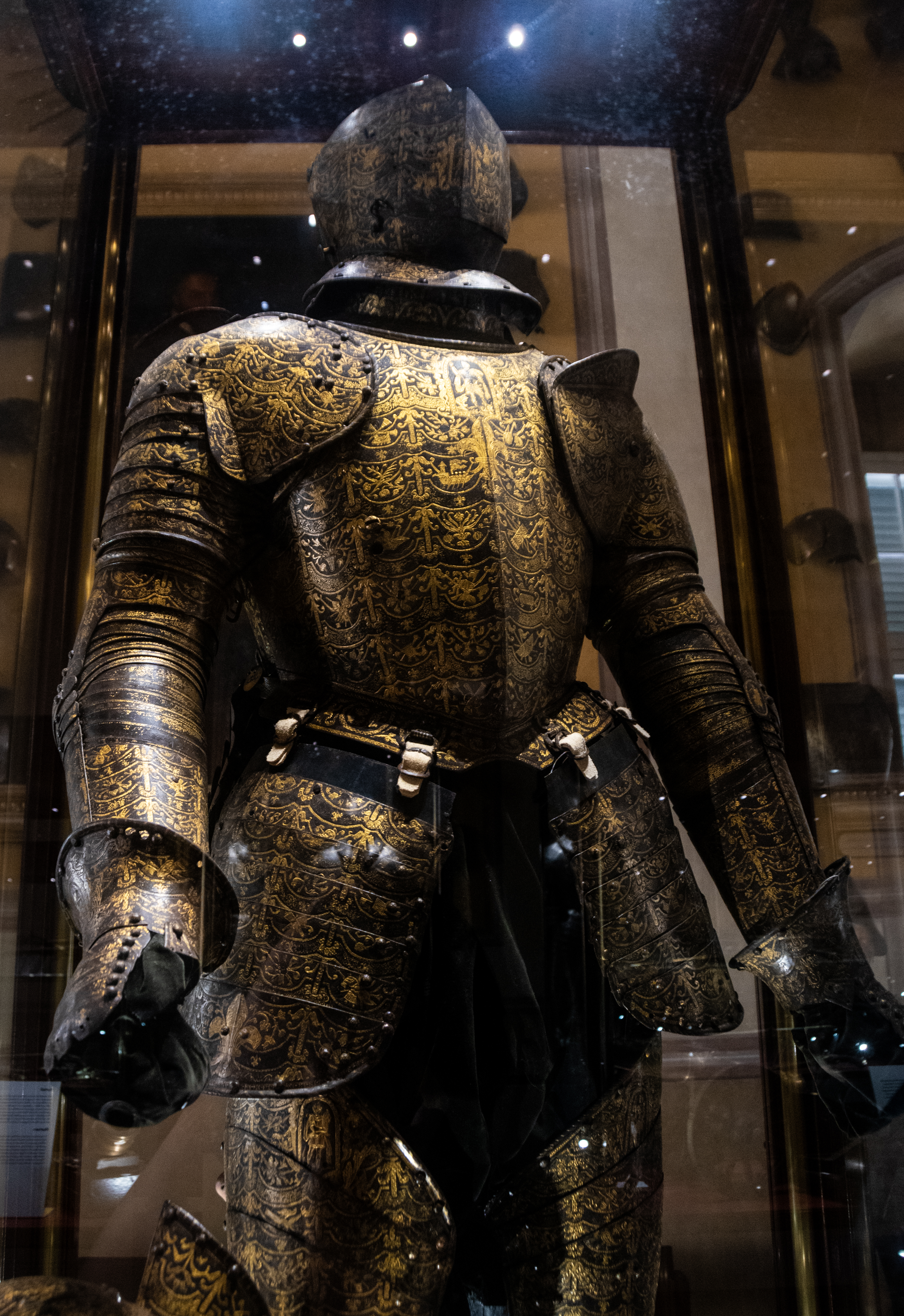
Milanese parade armour of Wignacourt, displayed in the Palace Armoury, Valletta

Fra Alof de Wignacourt (1547 – 14 September 1622) was a French nobleman who was the 54th Grand Master of the Order of St. John of Jerusalem from 10 February 1601 to his death in 1622. Unlike a number of the other Grand Masters, he was popular with the Maltese people. Wignacourt is mostly remembered for the construction of the Wignacourt Aqueduct as well as a series of coastal towers which also bear his name.

== Biography ==
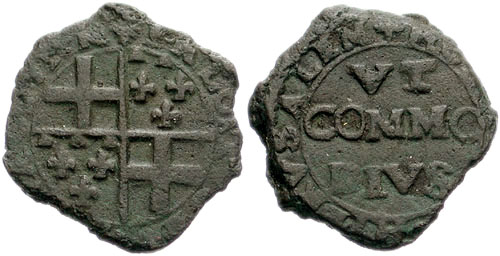
1601 grano coin of Wignacourt

Wignacourt joined the Order in 1564, aged seventeen, and distinguished himself at the Great Siege of Malta a year later. He was elected Grand Master in 1601.

In order to ensure that the local population continued to celebrate the date of his accession, he declared the date of the shipwreck of St Paul in Malta to be the 10 of February; a date that is celebrated passionately to this day.

He was patron of Caravaggio following the artist's arrival in Malta in 1607 until his arrest and subsequent expulsion from the Order in 1608.

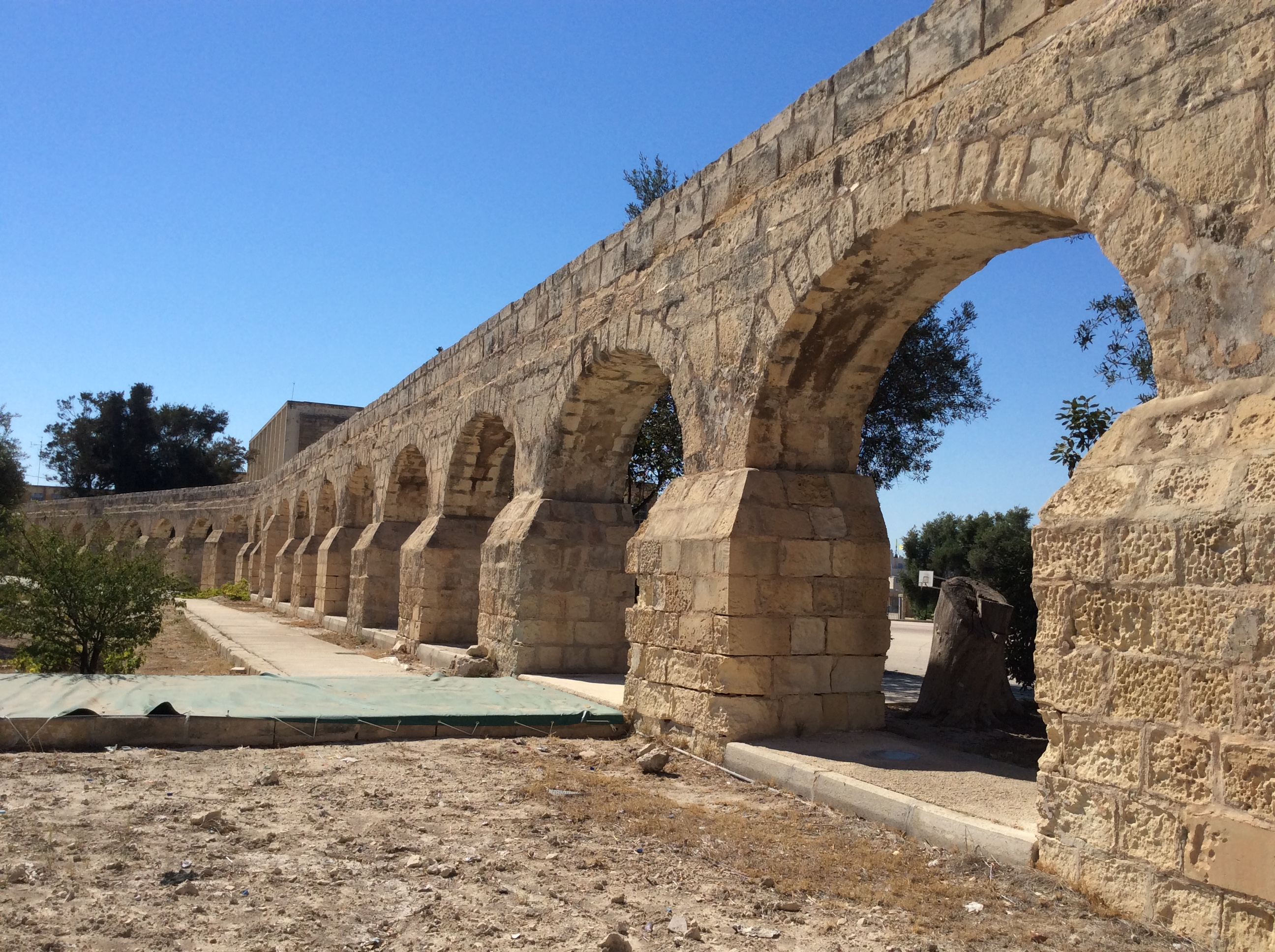
Part of the Wignacourt Aqueduct at Birkirkara

His reign was notable for the construction of a number of coastal fortifications (the Wignacourt towers), and of the Wignacourt Aqueduct that brought water from the plateau above Rabat to Valletta. The Wignacourt Arch was built as a part of the aqueduct between Birkirkara and Santa Venera, and it had his coat of arms with three fleur-de-lys on it, giving it the name of the Fleur-de-Lys Gate. A settlement which developed around this area is now known as Fleur-de-Lys, and the three fleur-de-lys from the coat of arms also appear on the flag of Santa Venera.

During his reign, in 1614 the Ottomans made their final attempt to conquer Malta. Six thousand men landed at Marsascala Bay and raided the village of Żejtun. The Order's cavalry and Maltese civilians, however, managed to overcome the Turks who retreated, without a single Christian dead.

His parade armour survives and is one of the treasures of the armoury of the Grandmaster's Palace in Valletta.

Alof de Wignacourt died of apoplexy while he was out shooting on 14 September 1622 at the age of 75.

== See also ==
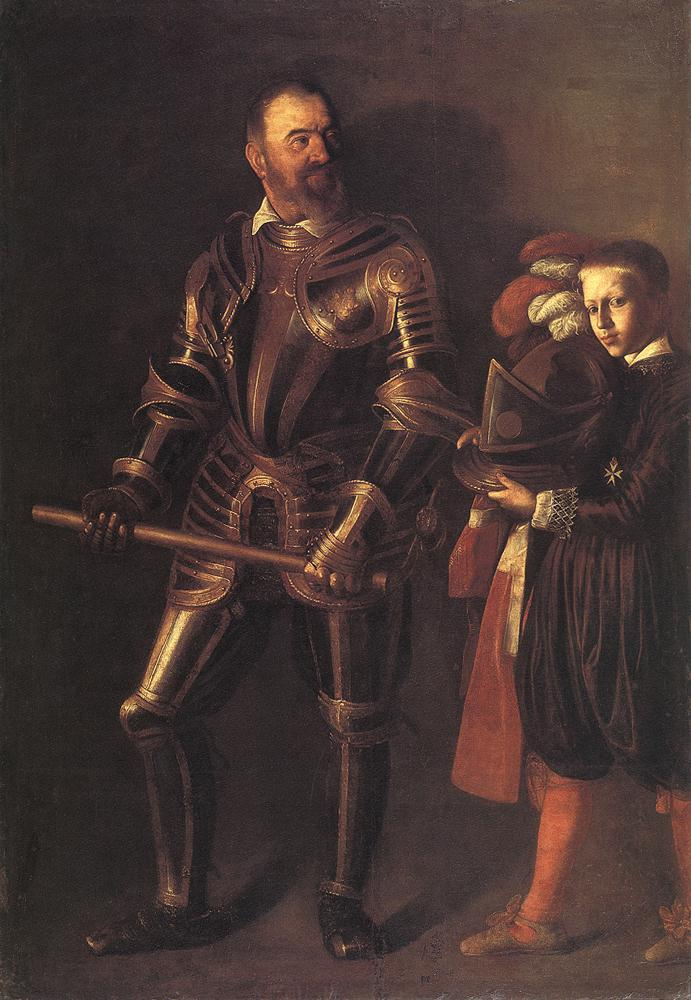
Wignacourt with his page boy

- Wignacourt towers
- Portrait of Alof de Wignacourt and his Page

Preceded by Martin Garzez	Grand Master of the Knights Hospitaller; 1601–1622	Succeeded by Luís Mendes de Vasconcellos
