= Corinthia (disambiguation) =

Corinthia is a regional unit of Greece, situated around the city of Corinth.

Corinthia may also refer to:

- Corinthia (ancient region), in ancient Greece
- Corinthia (constituency), electoral district in modern Greece
- Corinthia (Conan), a nation in the fictional world of Conan the Barbarian
- USS Corinthia (SP-938), a U.S. Navy patrol vessel 1917–1918
- Corinthia Group of Companies
  - Corinthia Hotels International
  - Corinthia Hotel Budapest
  - Corinthia Hotel Khartoum
  - Corinthia Hotel London
  - Corinthia Hotel Prague
  - Corinthia Hotel St. Petersburg
  - Corinthia Hotel Tripoli
