= Jerma Palace Hotel =

Hotel in Marsaskala, Malta, 1982–2007

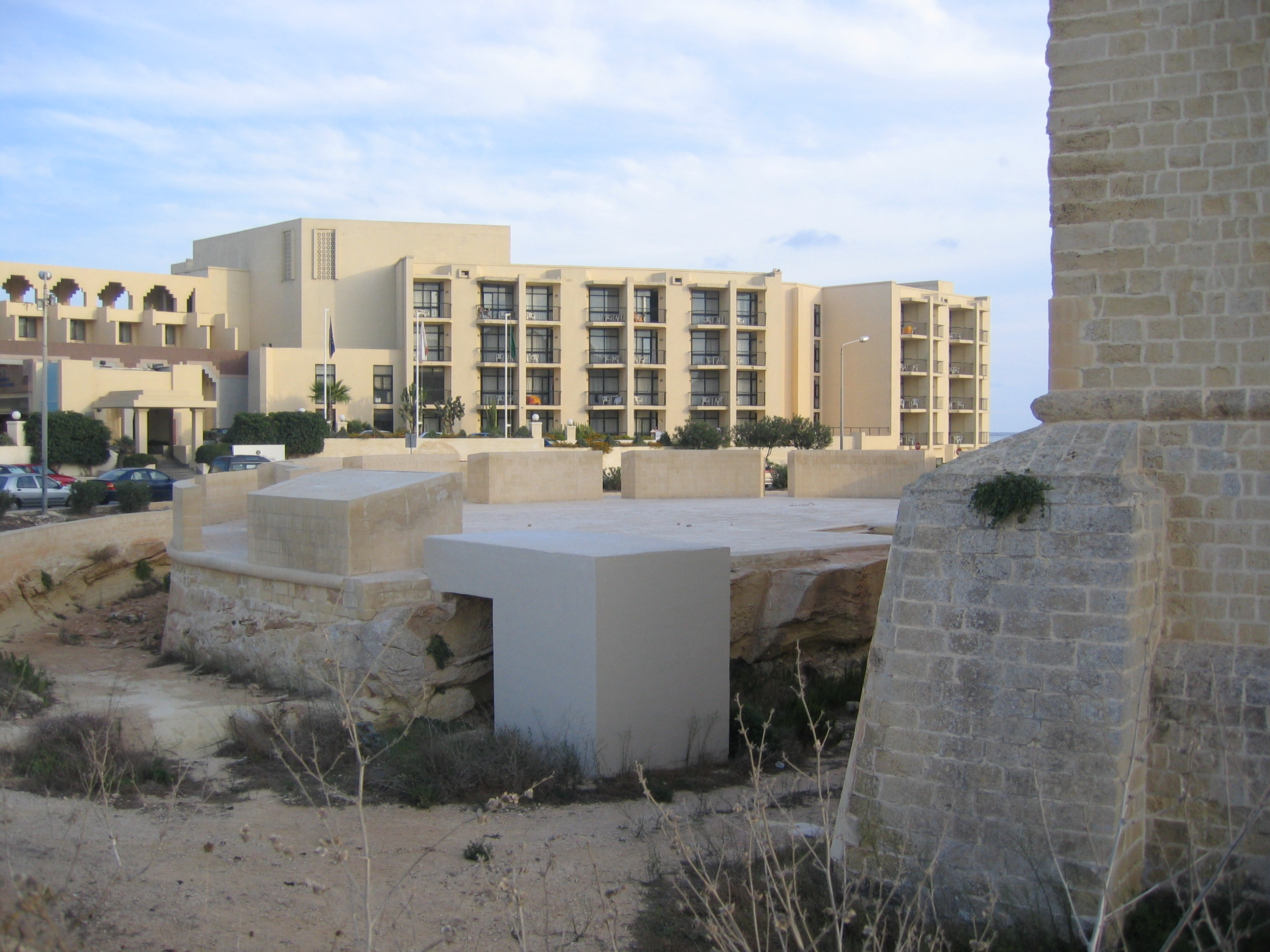
- Jerma Palace Hotel in 2005
- Interactive map of the Jerma Palace Hotel area
- Alternative names: Corinthia Jerma Palace Hotel

General information
- Status: Ruins
- Type: Hotel
- Location: Marsaskala, Malta
- Coordinates: 35°51′40″N 14°34′25″E
- Named for: Jer-ma; Jamahiriya-Malta
- Opened: 1982
- Closed: March 2007
- Owner: Jefpet Limited

Technical details
- Material: Limestone
- Grounds: 38,745 m^{2} (417,050 sq ft)

Design and construction
- Architect: Roger Westman

Other information
- Number of rooms: 345

The Jerma Palace Hotel is a former four-star hotel in Marsaskala, Malta. It was opened as a Libyan investment in 1982, and was managed by Corinthia Hotels International. It was the largest hotel in southern Malta until it closed down in 2007. The building was subsequently abandoned, and it has since fallen into disrepair. Plans to demolish it began in 2016.

== History ==
=== In operation (1982–2007) ===
The Jerma Palace Hotel was built on a headland called il-Ħamrija, close to the 17th-century Saint Thomas Tower. The land originally belonged to Franciscan Conventuals and Ivan Burridge, who sold it to San Tumas Holdings. In 1976, San Tumas sold the plot to the Libyan Foreign Investment Company. The Jerma Palace Hotel was subsequently built, and it opened in 1982. The hotel was managed by Corinthia Hotels International through a management agreement. Libyan dictator Muammar Gaddafi had a presidential suite within the hotel. A 1982 parliamentary resolution decreed that the area could only be developed for touristic purposes.

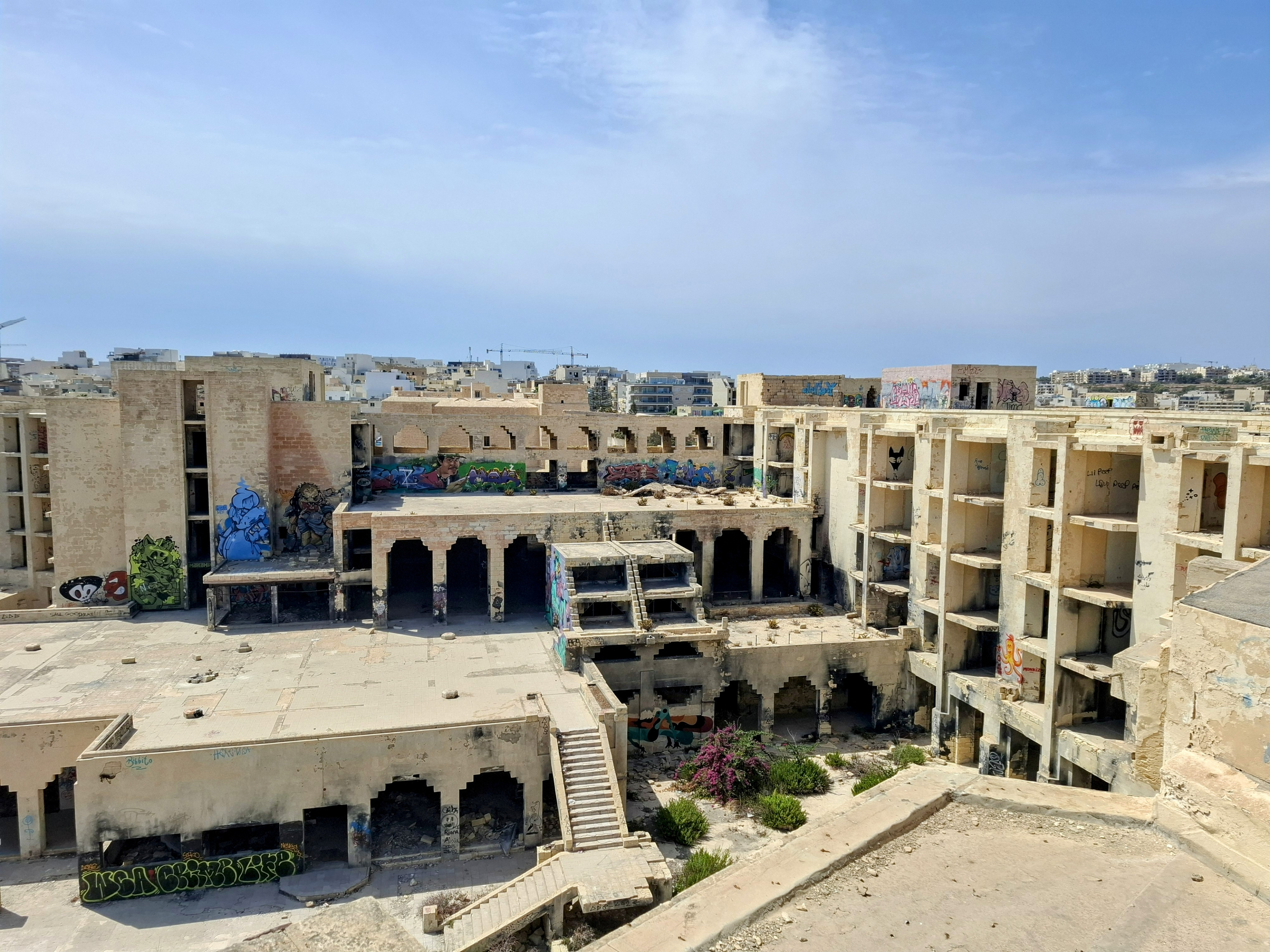
The abandoned hotel seen from the rooftop in 2024

The Jerma Palace was the largest hotel in the south of Malta, and its opening contributed to transforming Marsaskala from a traditional fishing village to a small resort.

=== Dereliction ===
The hotel closed down in March 2007, and is now in a derelict state, with parts of it having collapsed and others being in danger of collapsing. Its interior has been stripped of everything of value, with carpets, marble floors, doors, tiles and even bricks being stolen. The walls are covered in graffiti. The building is occupied by squatters, and it is popular with drug addicts. The former hotel also became an illegal dumping ground, with people disposing of their garbage there. Rubbish left at the hotel caused a number of fires.

=== Redevelopment projects ===
In July 2008 the Jerma Palace was sold for €18.6 million to the brothers Jeffrey and Peter Montebello (Jefpet Limited, JPM Construction), who planned to transform the former hotel into apartments, a five-star hotel and a yacht marina. However, then-prime minister Lawrence Gonzi stated that only a hotel, and not apartments, could be developed on the site, since the 2006 local plan had identified the site to be mainly used for tourist accommodation. JPM also faced a massive €40 million loan call-in which forced them to scale down their ambitions. In July 2015 the Marsaskala local council also wrote to the Planning Authority that declaring itself "opposed to any application which includes the development of apartments".

Following a request by the Marsaskala local council and the issue of an enforcement notice, on 20 August 2016 the Planning Authority ordered the hotel's owners to demolish the building. On that same day, the building caught fire, which was put out by the Civil Protection Department. The Jerma Palace, which had been valued at €20.8 million, was to be sold at a judicial auction in October 2016. The demolition of the dilapidated hotel buildings was to cost around €1.5 million. The same year, Nationalist Party local councillor Charlot Cassar suggested that the site be bought by the Maltese government and turned into an open space for public enjoyment. In September 2016, the owners appealed against an enforcement order by the Planning Authority. In May 2018, the Environment and Planning Review Tribunal upheld an appeal and annulled the demolition order.

The hotel as seen from within the premises in March 2026

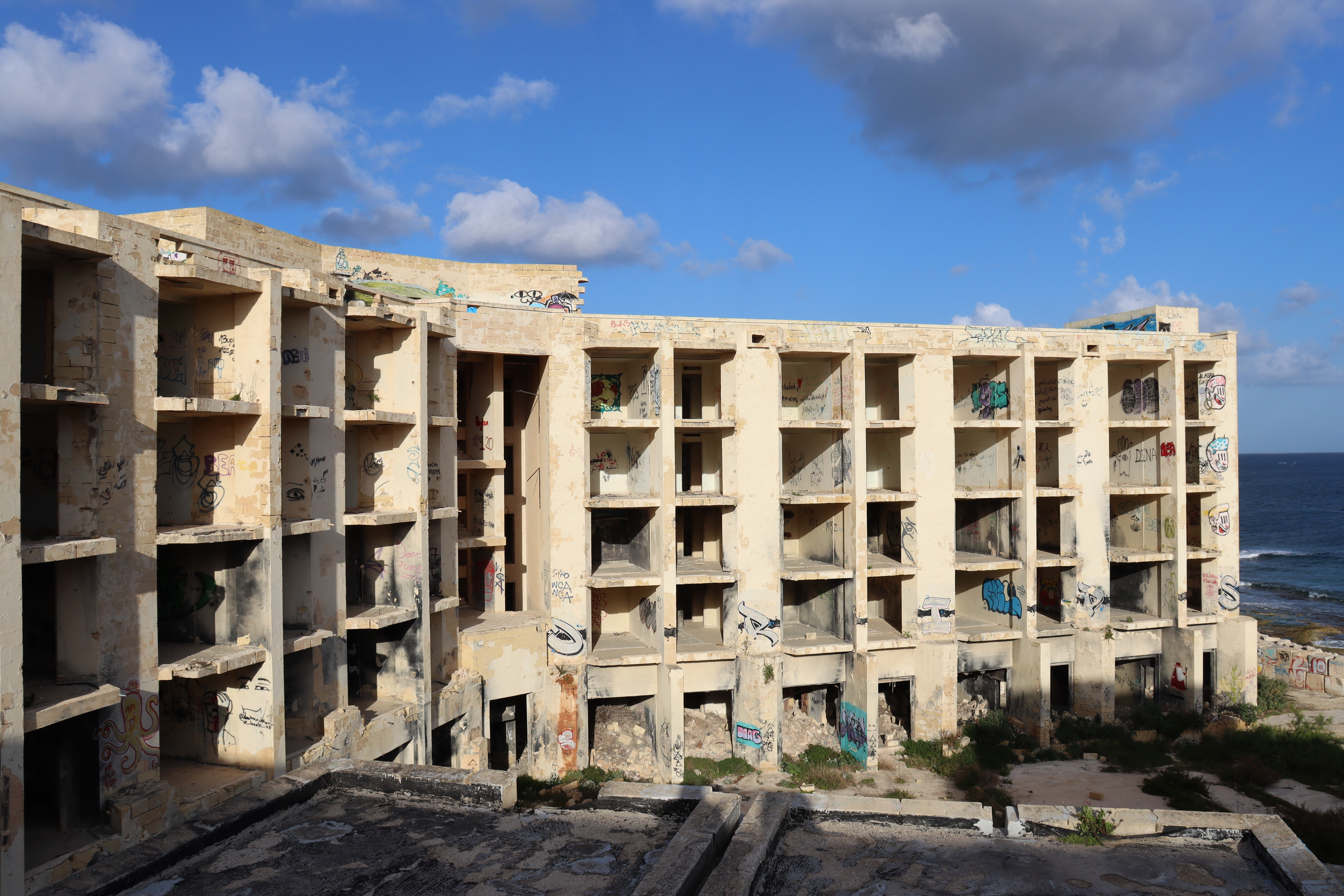
From a platform level to the third floor

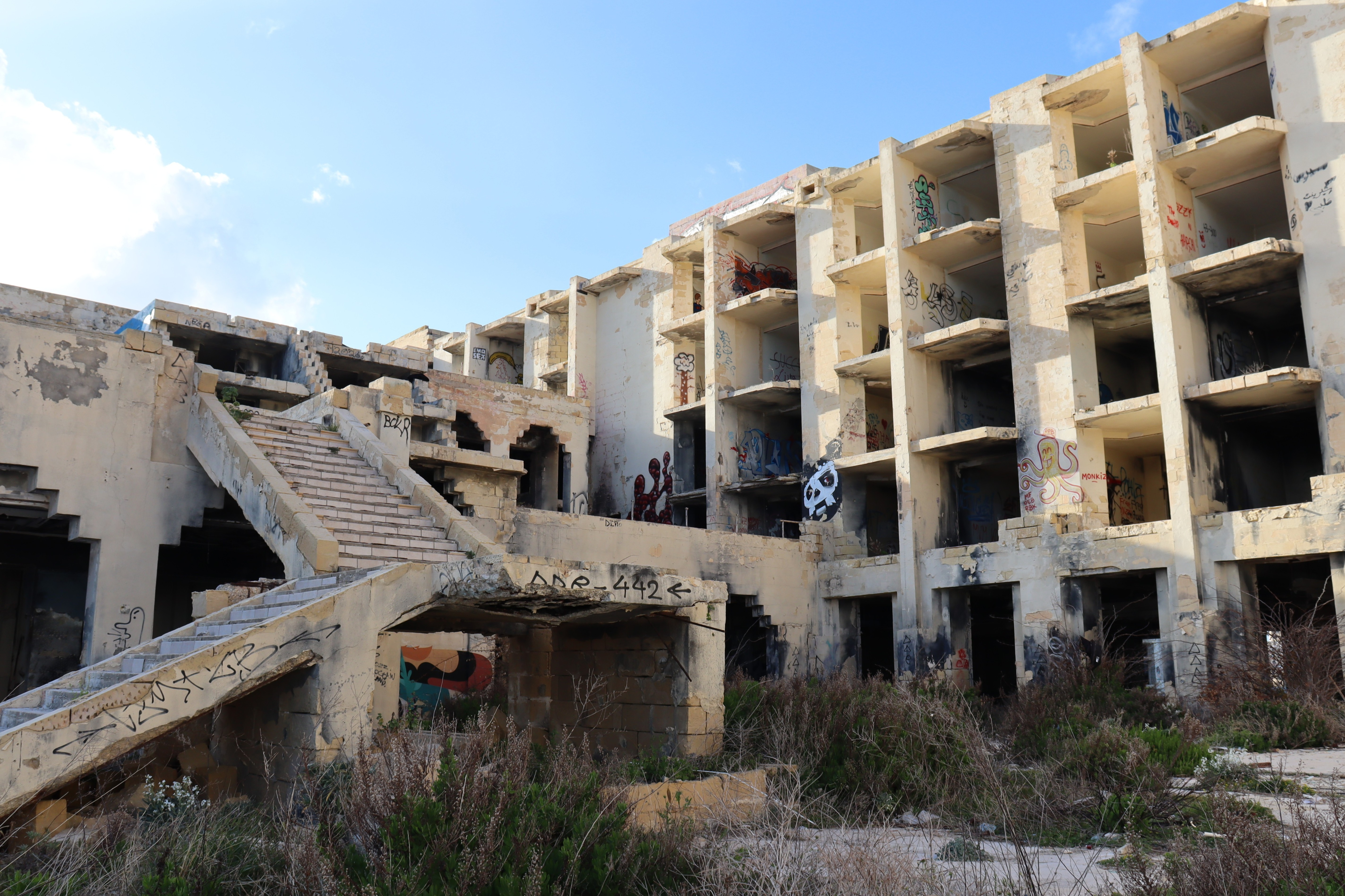
At ground level

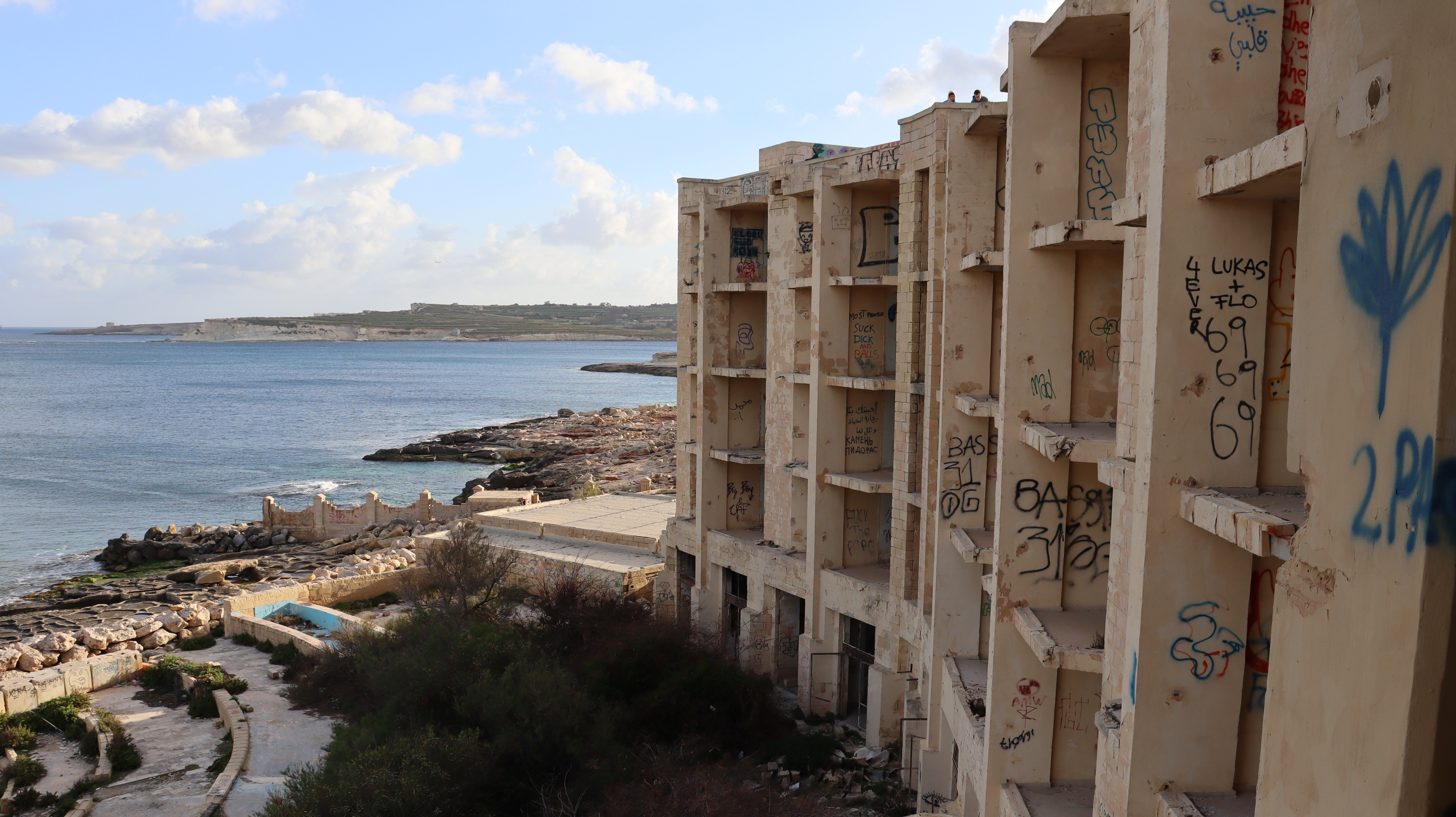
From the second or third floor

In 2016, the new owner, developer Charles Camilleri through his company Porto Notos Ltd (co-owned with lawyer Pierre Lofaro) applied to demolish the former hotel and replace it with a massive development of two high-rise residential towers of 44 and 32 storeys, and a 22-storey hotel on reclaimed land in the vicinity. The "three towers" proposal was later shrunk to units of 12 and 13 storeys, including an apartment complex; in December 2017, the Marsaskala local council, including Labour Party mayor Mario Calleja, voted overwhelmingly in favour of this new project, against the council's prior position in July 2015. The development would have had a 7,000 square metre footprint with a floor area of 61,000 square metres, as well as a 10,500 square metre public park around Saint Thomas Tower. The proposal had not been submitted to planning process, so no environmental impact assessment was prepared.

The project was withdrawn after Camilleri had sold the site to Gozitan property magnate Joseph Portelli for €90 million in summer 2019. A development brief approved by the Maltese government in early 2020, in the last days of Joseph Muscat's administration, permitted development over 100,000 square meters, 40% of which allocated for apartments. A second development brief approved by the Robert Abela government in August 2020 downscaled the total investment to 65,000 square meters and a development of up to 8 storeys including for residential use, doubling the footprint of the estate from the current 8,700 to 17,700 square metres. In June 2020, Marsascala local council voted in favour of a 13-storey building on the side. Seven NGOs initiated legal action against the decision, deeming that the Planning Authority had "arbitrarily increased the area of the development brief". Moviment Graffitti denounced the risk of further congestion in the area and the lack of respect for a historic site like Saint Thomas Tower.

Some rooms and corridors pictured in March 2026

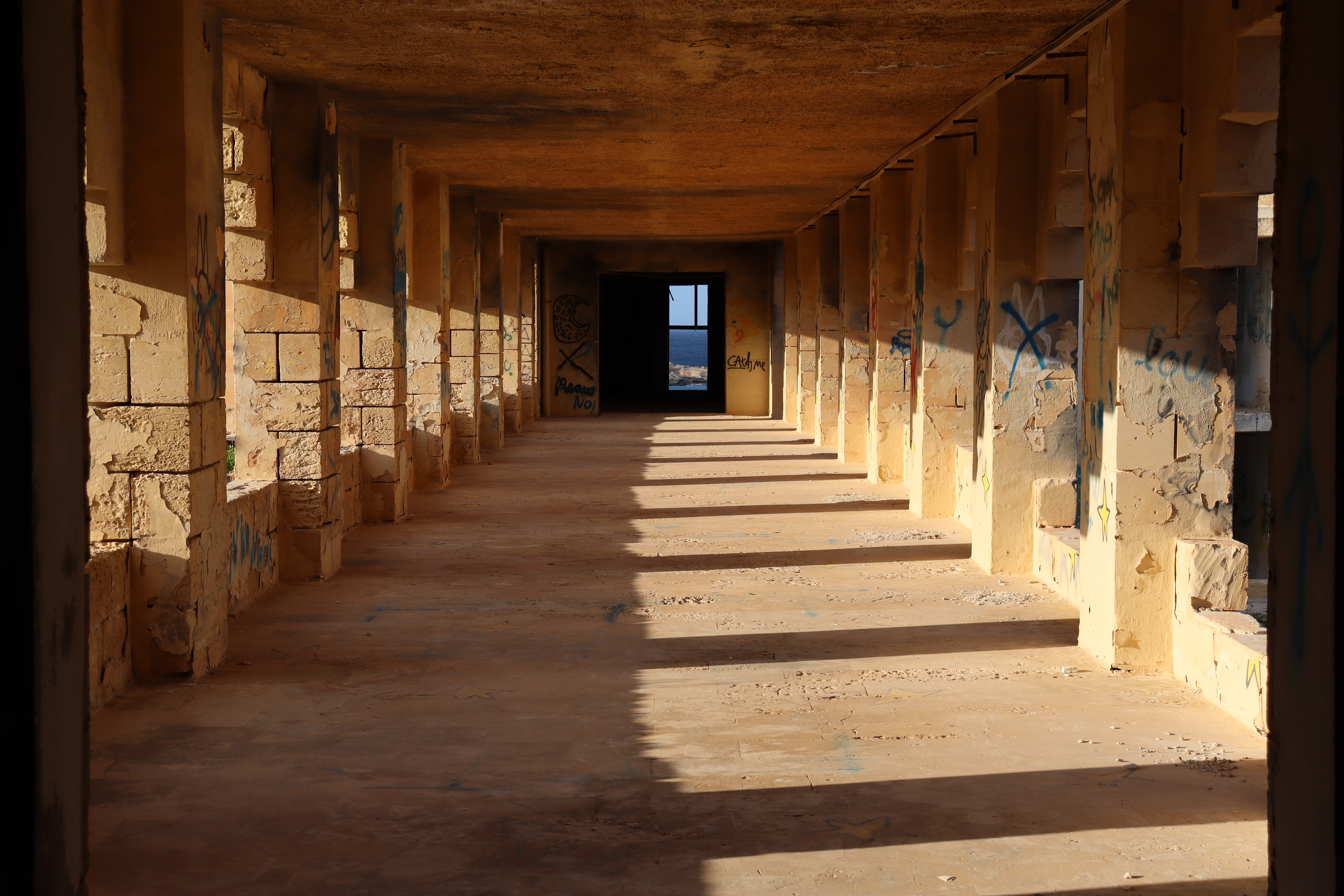
Corridor, around the third floor

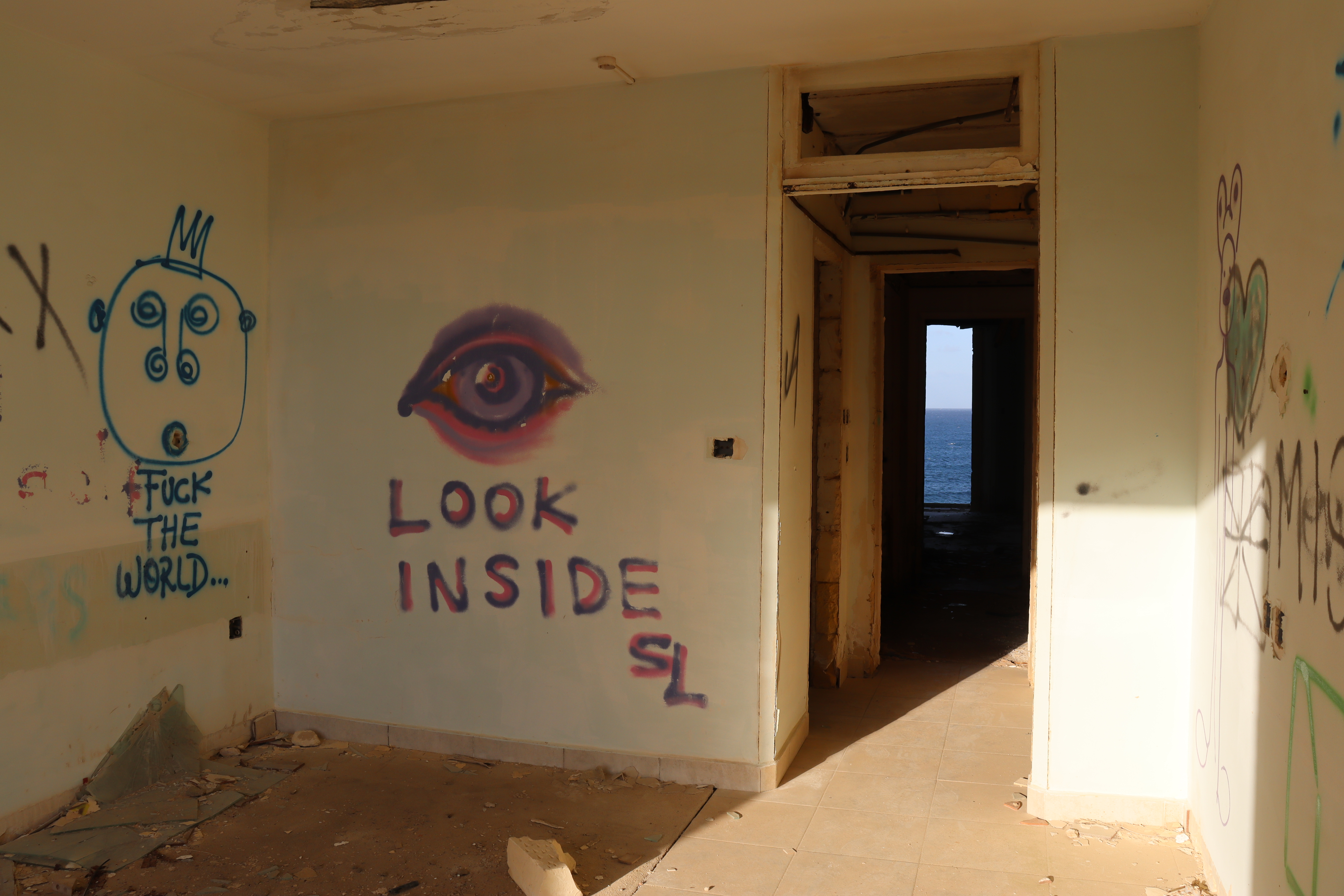
Room, around the third floor

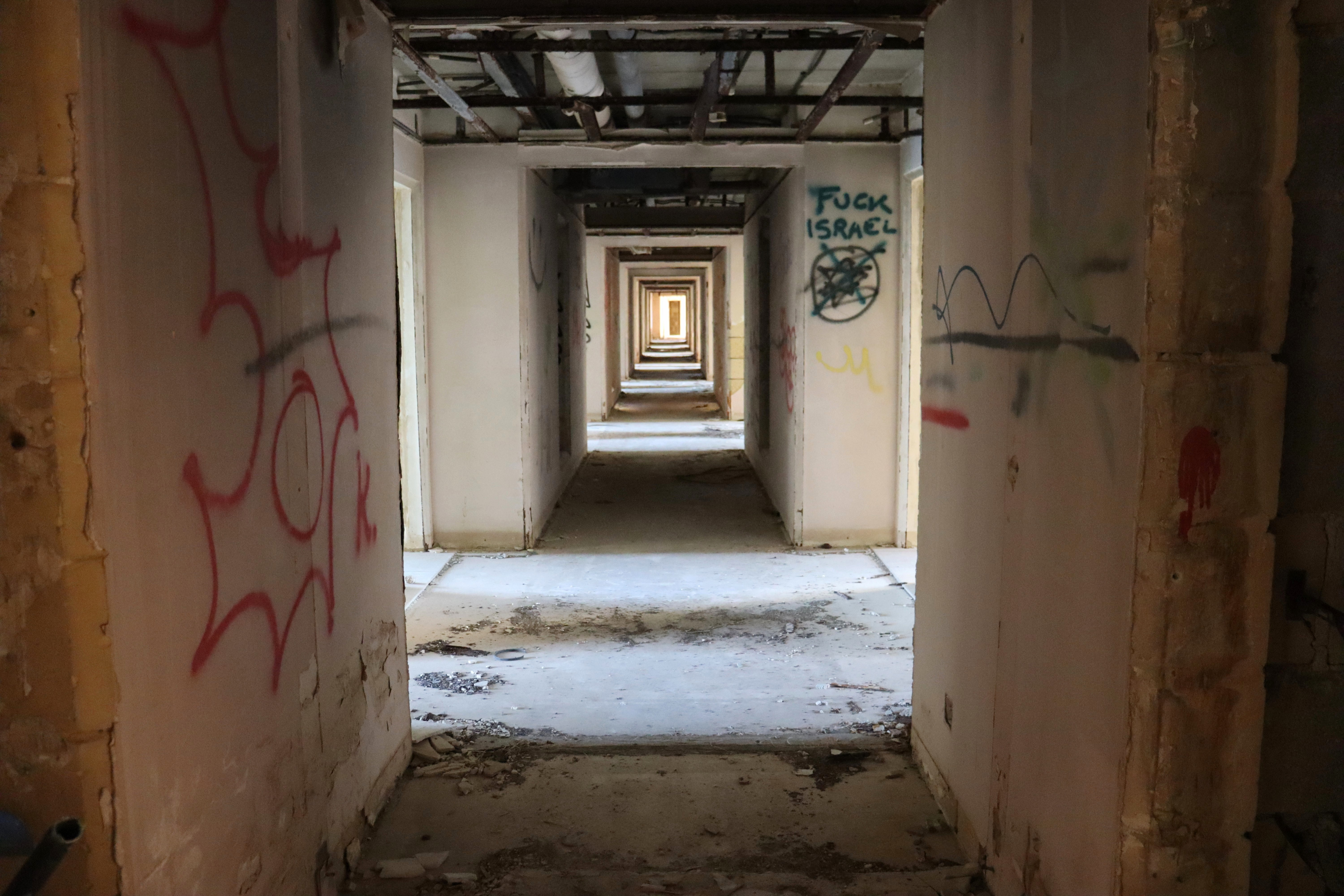
Corridor, around the third floor

As of 2021, Portelli has not yet filed an application with specific plans and designs with the Planning Authority, but has stated that he intends to develop on site a complex of 130 apartments, a 500-room hotel and a public square in front of Saint Thomas Tower. The Green Party called for the government to revise their plans. The Malta Chamber of Commerce also called on the government to stop new applications, given the oversupply in hotel beds.

=== Cultural references ===
The music video for "All of My Love", the Maltese 2020 Eurovision Song Contest entry, was filmed onsite. In 2021, the hotel was shown as a fictive alien architectural background in the Foundation series.

== Gallery ==
Graffiti

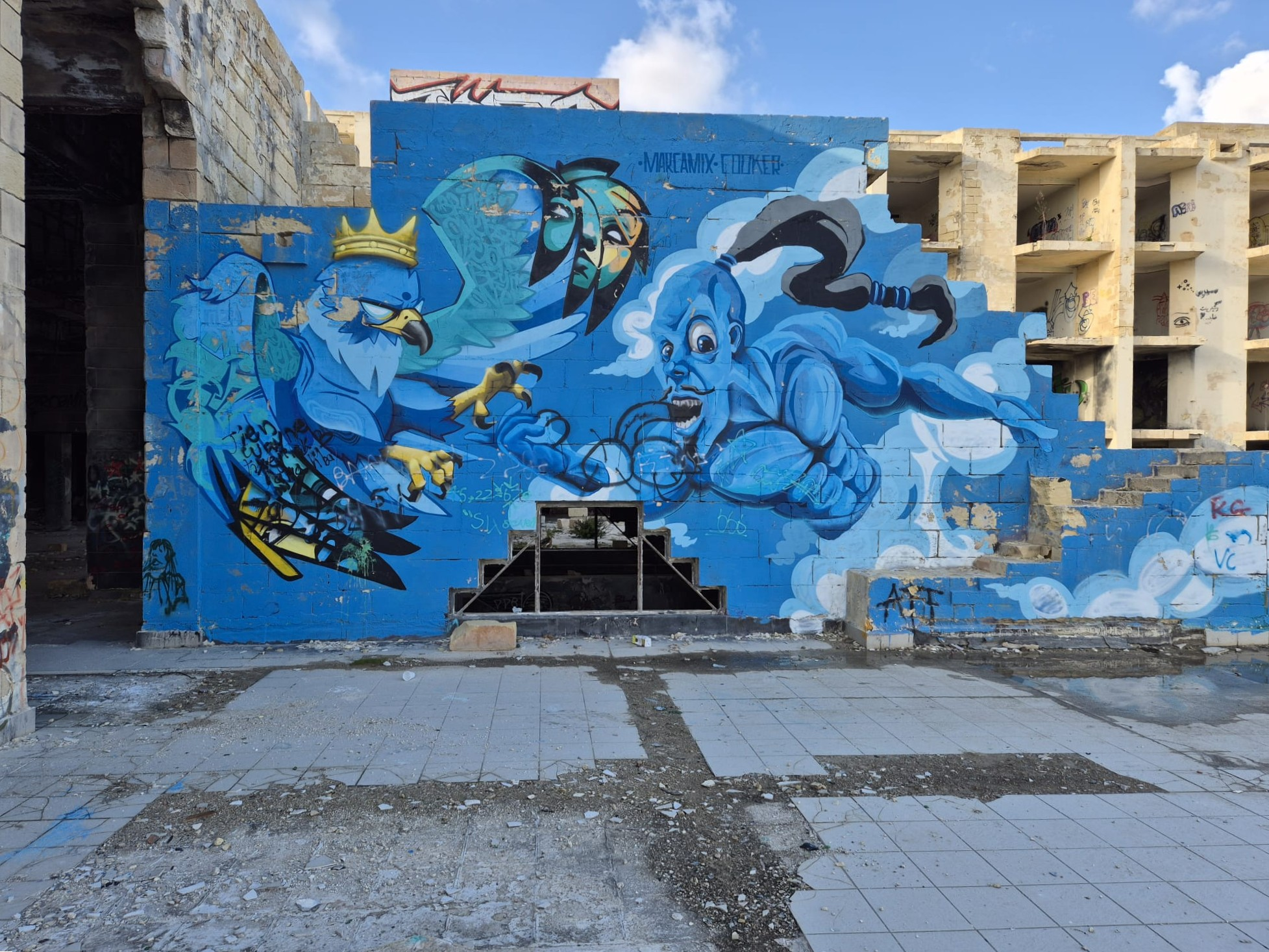
An outside platform level to the third floor, 2026

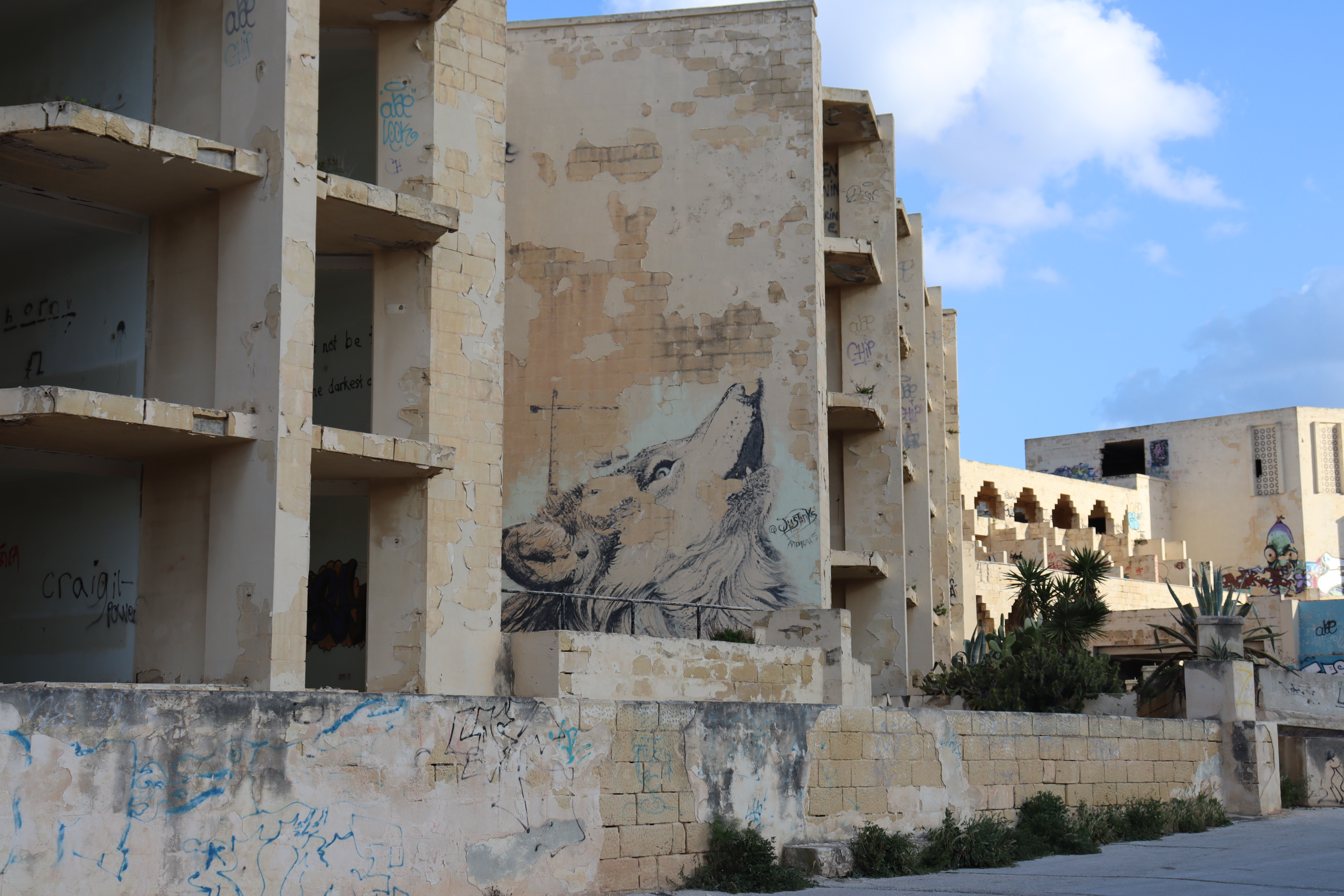
Exterior wall, 2026

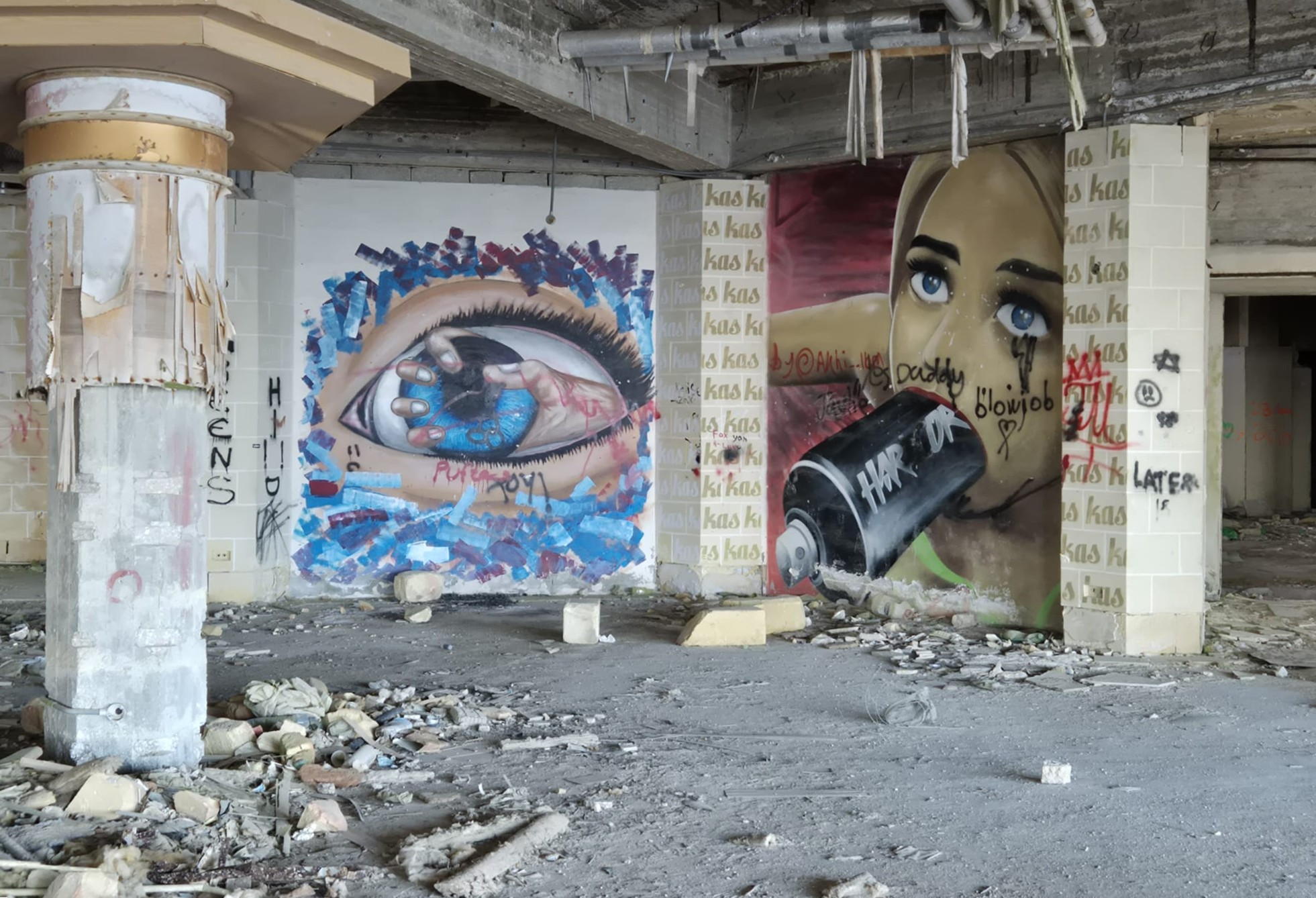
Ground floor area, 2026

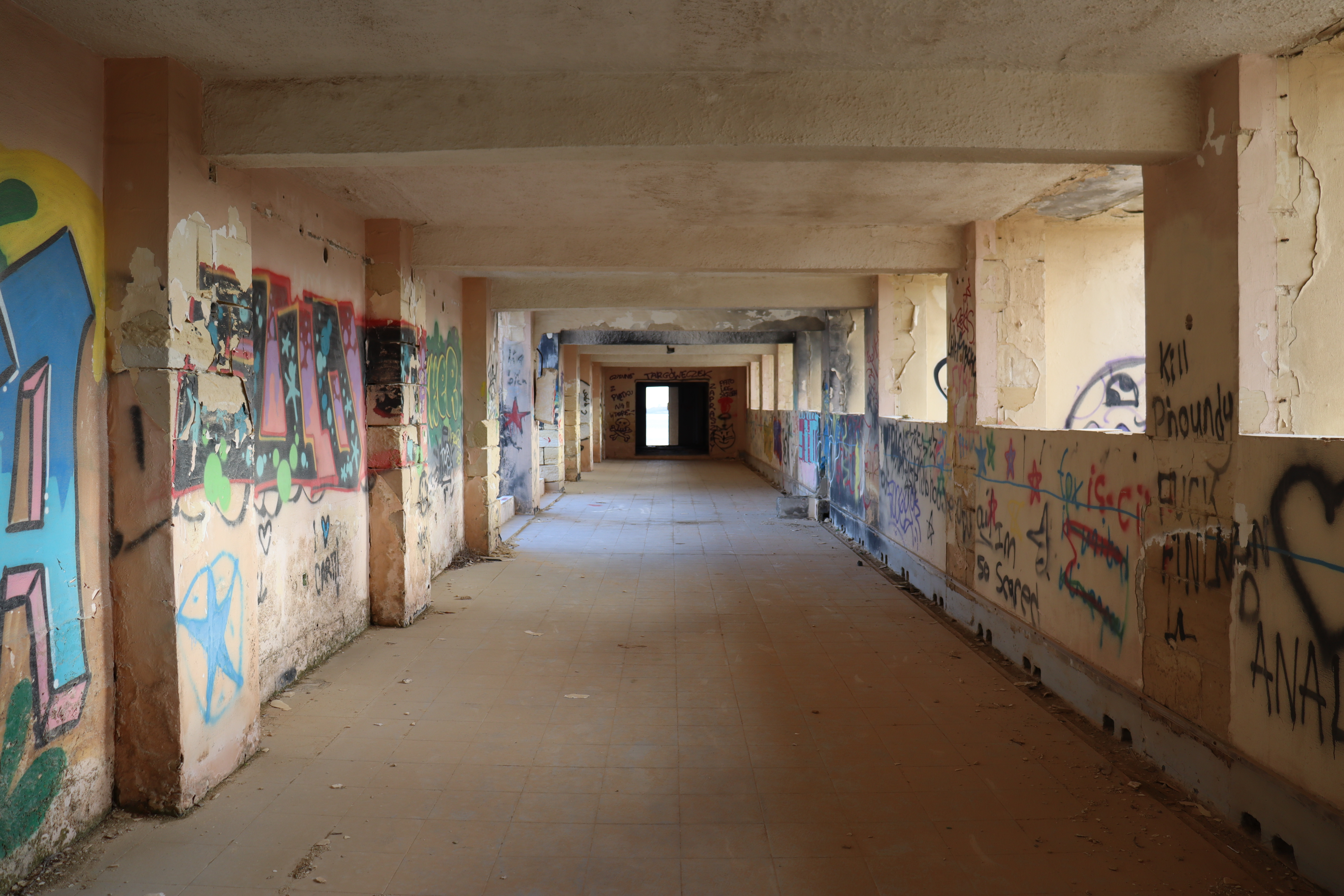
First floor corridor, 2026

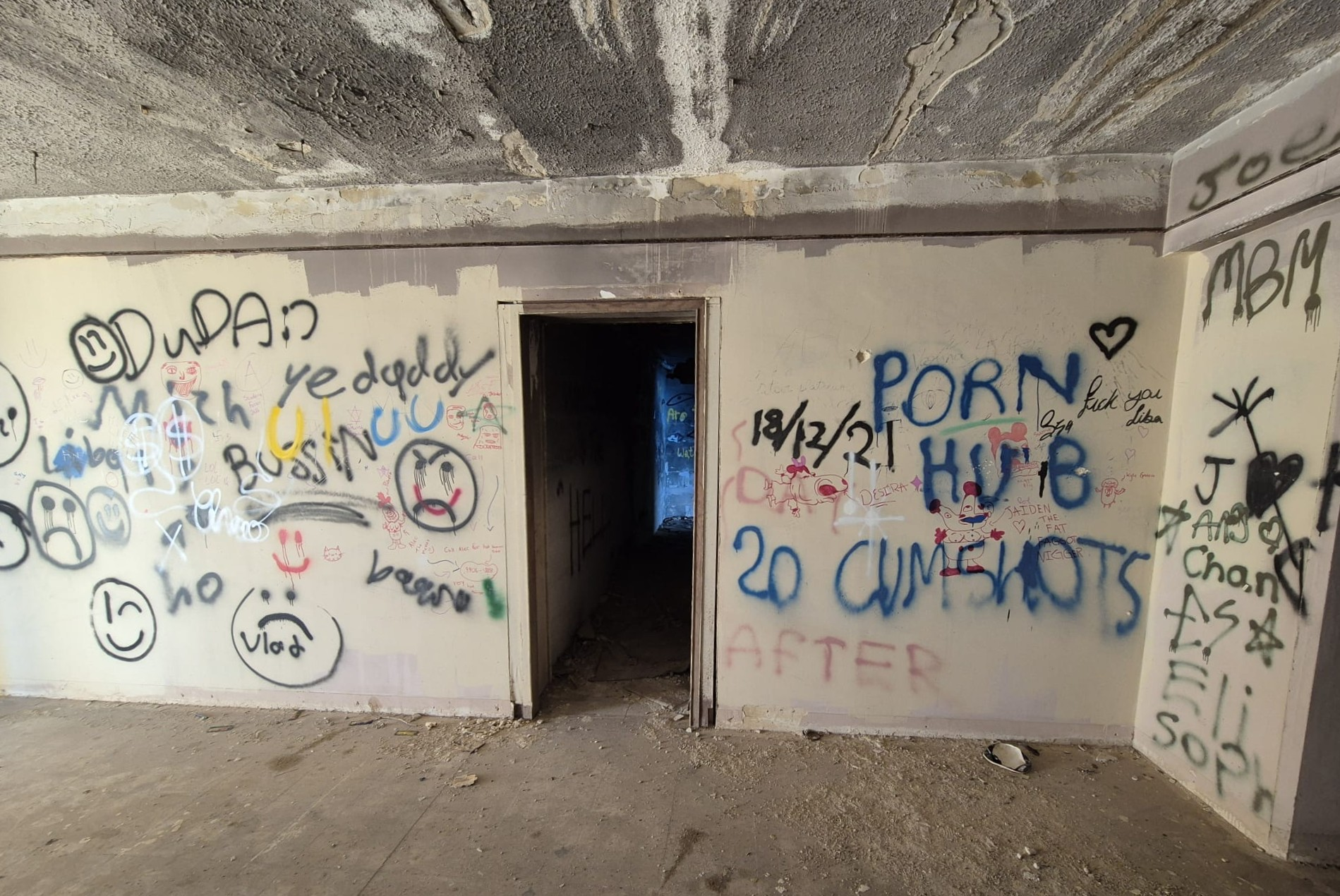
Third floor room, 2026
Outdoor spaces

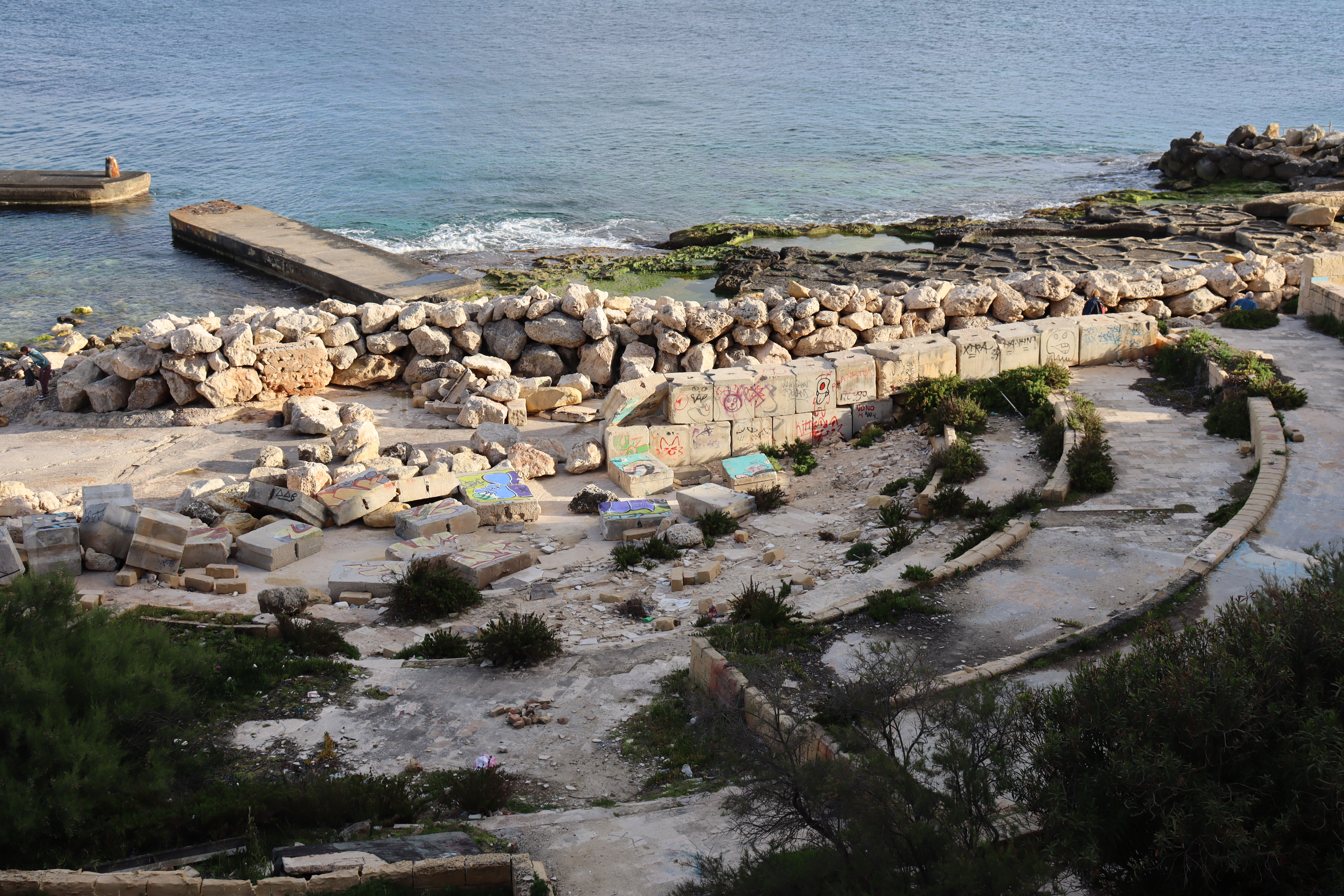
Ruins by the sea, 2026

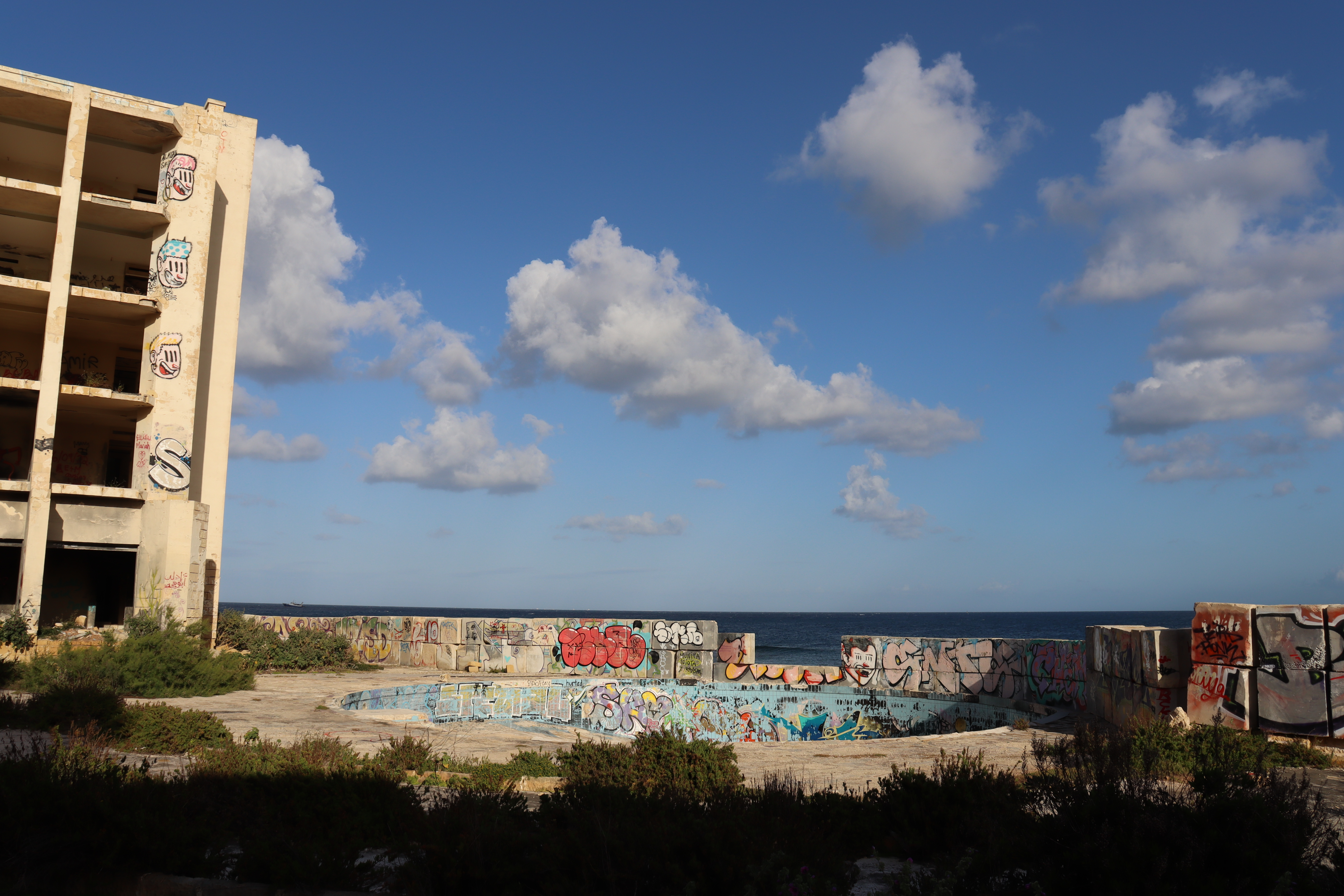
Outdoor pool, 2026

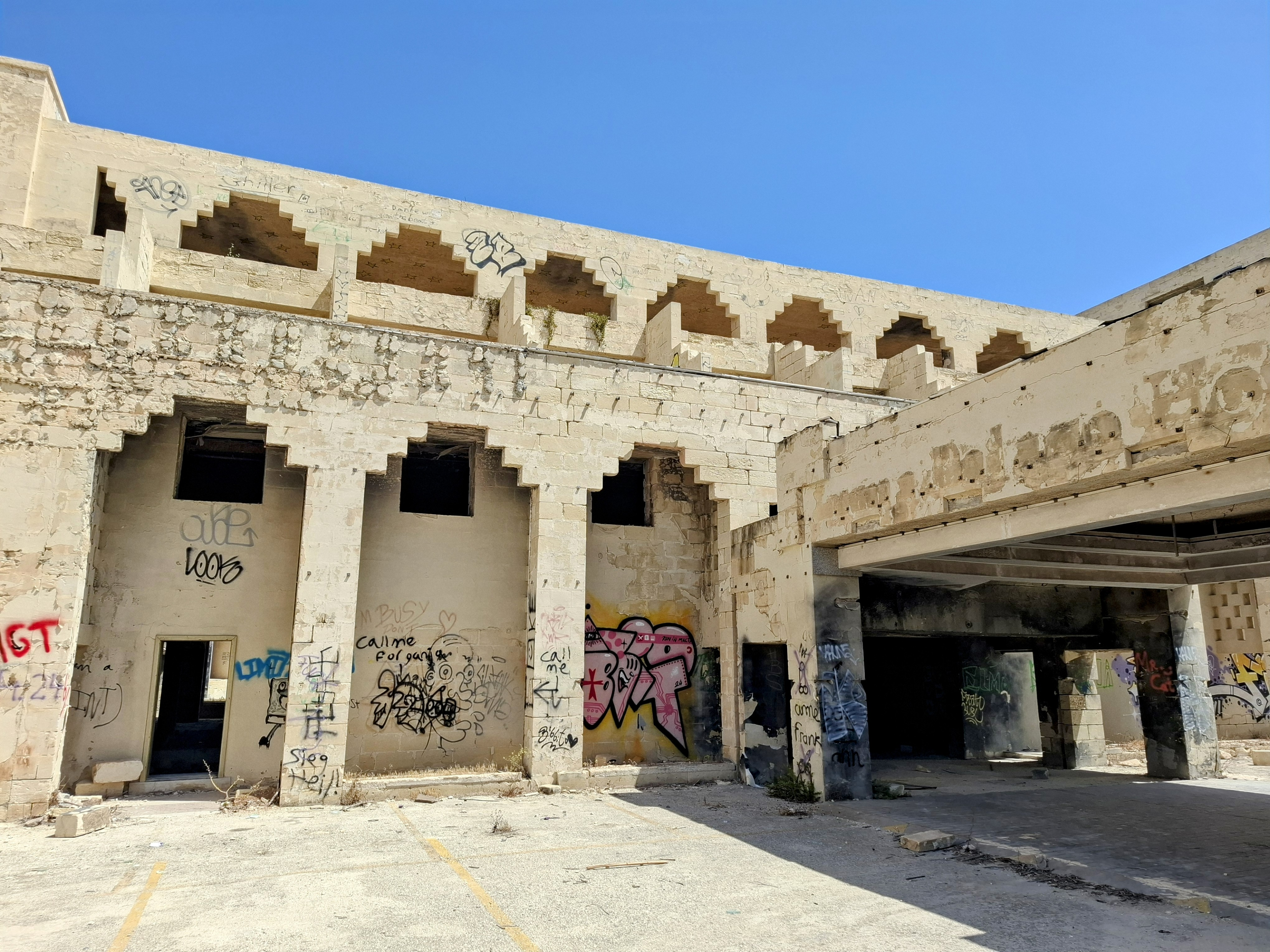
Entrance to the hotel, 2024
General views

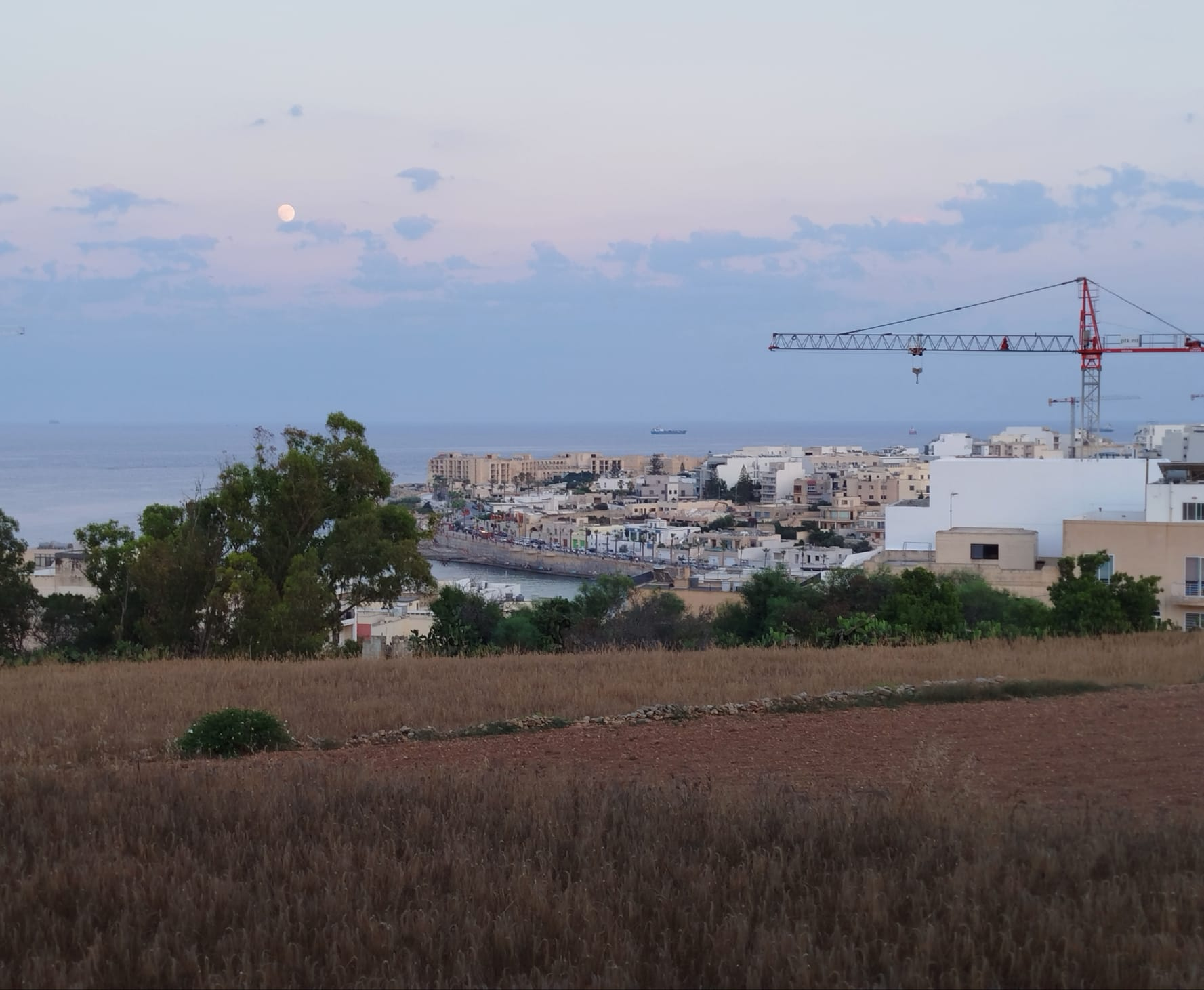
Seen in the distance from Żonqor, 2026

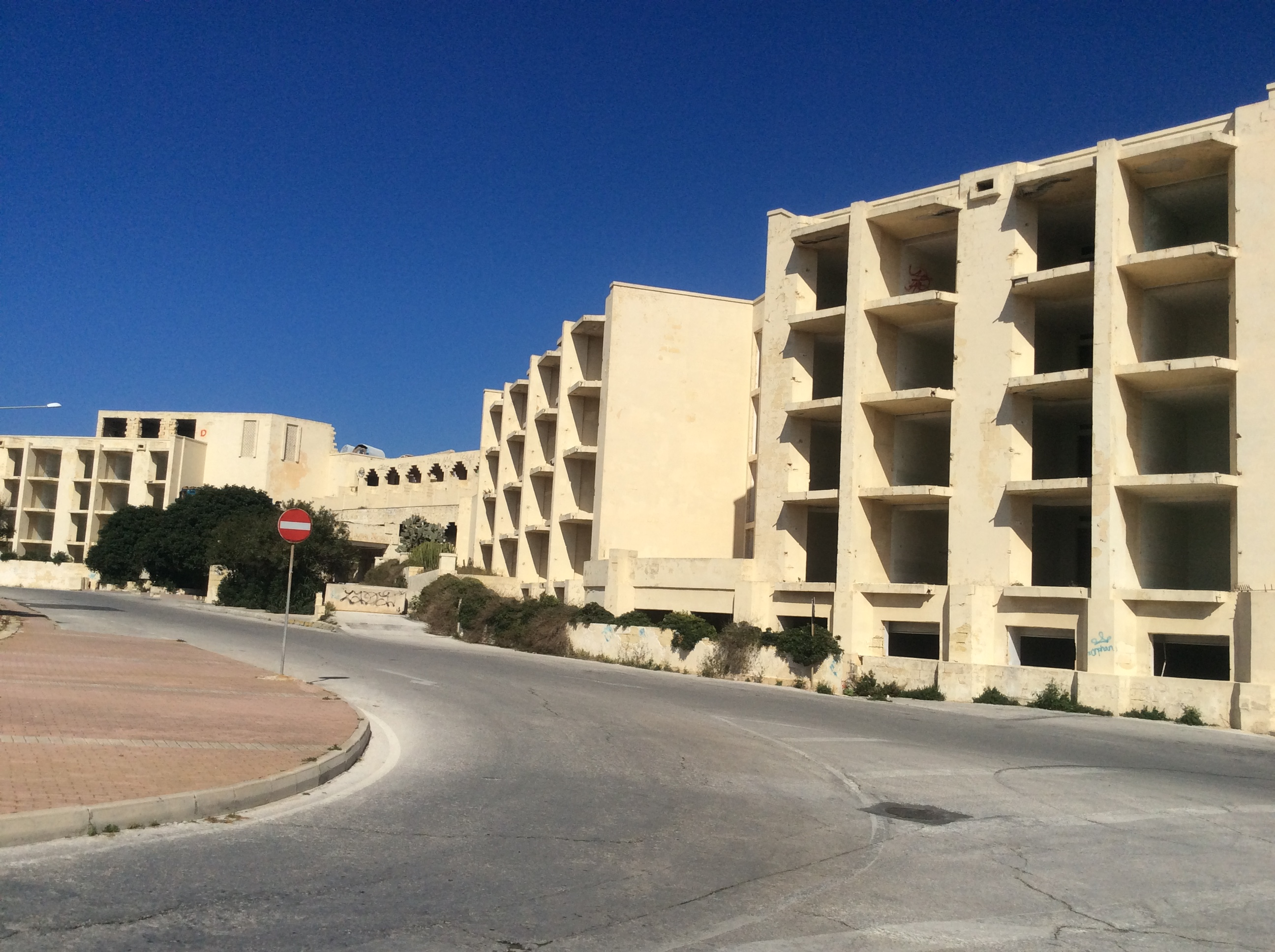
From the adjacent road, 2016

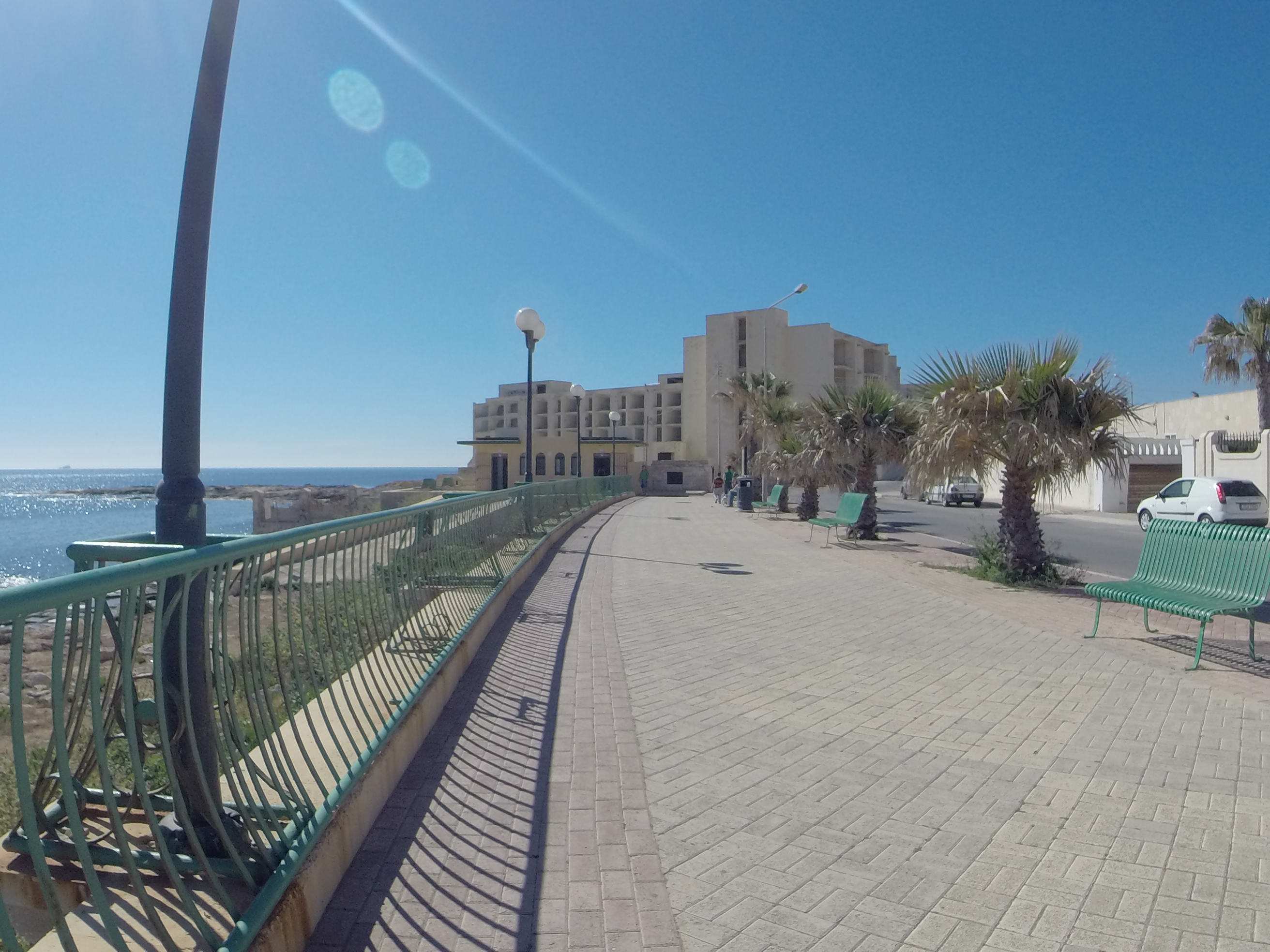
From the Marsaskala promande, 2015
