= Fort St. Thomas =

Fort St. Thomas may refer to:

- St. Thomas Fort, a Portuguese fort in Tangasseri, Kerala, India
- Fort St. Thomas, a Hospitaller tower in Marsaskala, Malta
