= Alfred Pisani =

Maltese businessman and hotelier

- Pisani in 2005
- Born: 1938 or 1939 (age 86–87)
- Education: St. Edward's College, Malta
- Occupation: Hotelier
- Known for: Founder, chairman and CEO, Corinthia Group of Companies
- Spouse: Maria Pisani
- Children: 6

Alfred Pisani (born 1939) is a Maltese businessman and hotelier, among the founders of the Corinthia Group of Companies, and its chairman and chief executive since the company's inception in 1966.

== Biography ==
Pisani was born and raised in an upper-middle-class family in Malta; the second of four brothers and two sisters. He was educated at St. Edward's College, Malta.

His father, Paul, owned stakes in a matchbox factory and a flour mill in Malta, amongst various other property interests. Pisani started working in his father's business at sixteen years of age. Pisani's father died prematurely soon after acquiring one of the most prestigious villas in Malta as his private residence. Pisani subsequently hired out the property for wedding receptions (including his own), and this led to the opening of an 80-seat restaurant in December 1962. After Malta gained independence in 1964 and with the tourism industry flourishing, they opened a 40-room hotel, the Corinthia Palace in Attard, which was later expanded to 156 rooms.

Pisani has led the Corinthia Group from a one-hotel company to a diversified group. His business interests vary from equity participation, management, development and ownership of property and industrial catering, all on an international scale.

In December 2001, Pisani was appointed an Officer to the Maltese National Order of Merit.

Pisani is married to his second wife, Maria, and lives in Malta. His youngest daughter, Rebecca, manages the spa at the Corinthia Palace Hotel, San Anton, Malta. His other daughter, Alexandra, works for Corinthia Hotels. His son, Marcus also works for Corinthia Hotels. His first three children, Keyth, Dyrck and Enyd, are also involved in varying capacities within the organisation.
