= Corinthia Hotel Khartoum =

Hotel in Khartoum, Sudan

Coordinates: 15°36′24″N 32°30′49″E

- Hotel chain: Corinthia Hotels

General information
- Location: Khartoum, Sudan, Nile Road
- Opening: 2008
- Cost: 81 Million Euro
- Owner: Libyan government
- Operator: Corinthia Hotels

Other information
- Number of rooms: 230
- Number of restaurants: 6

The Corinthia Hotel Khartoum is a five-star hotel in central Khartoum, Sudan, on the meeting point of the Blue Nile and White Nile and in the centre of Khartoum's commercial, business, and administrative districts. It is located next to the Friendship Hall of Khartoum and the Tuti Bridge.

== History ==
The hotel opened on 17 August 2008. It was built and financed by the Libyan government under Muammar Gaddafi's regime at an estimated cost of over 80 million euros (approximately US$100 million). The hotel's construction provided local employment opportunities and marked the establishment of Khartoum's first luxury hotel. Its distinctive oval-curved façade, designed to resemble a ship's sail, has become a notable feature of Khartoum's skyline.

Due to its funding source and unique architecture, the building is colloquially known as "Gaddafi's Egg" among locals. The hotel's development occurred during a period of improved relations between Libya and Sudan in the early 2000s, with Libya playing a role in mediating the Darfur crisis. Since its opening, the Corinthia Hotel Khartoum has remained the only five-star luxury hotel in Sudan, providing high-end accommodations and amenities.

The hotel was damaged in the Sudanese civil war that began in 2023, during the Battle of Khartoum.

== Architecture ==
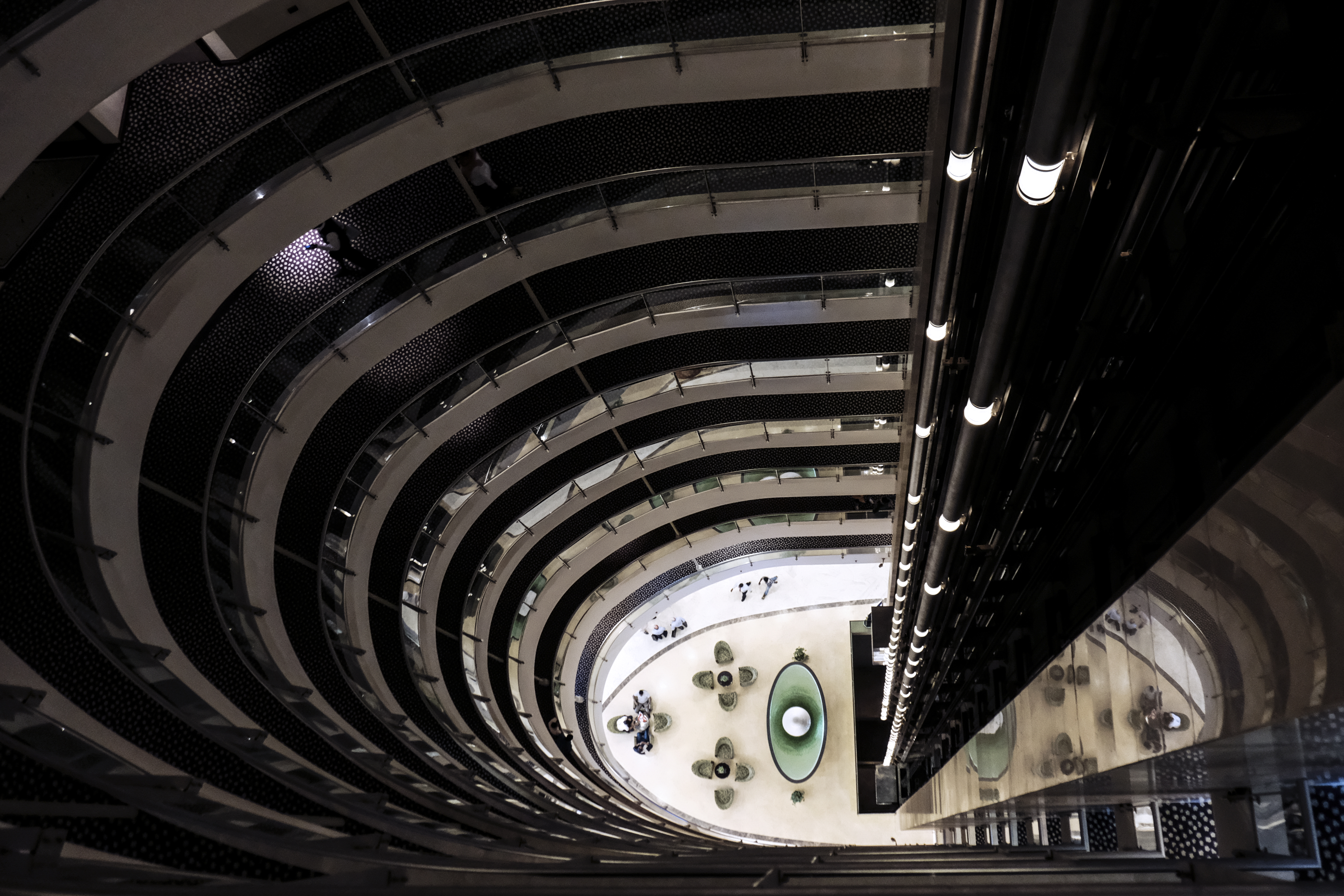
Lobby interior of the Corinthia Hotel Khartoum

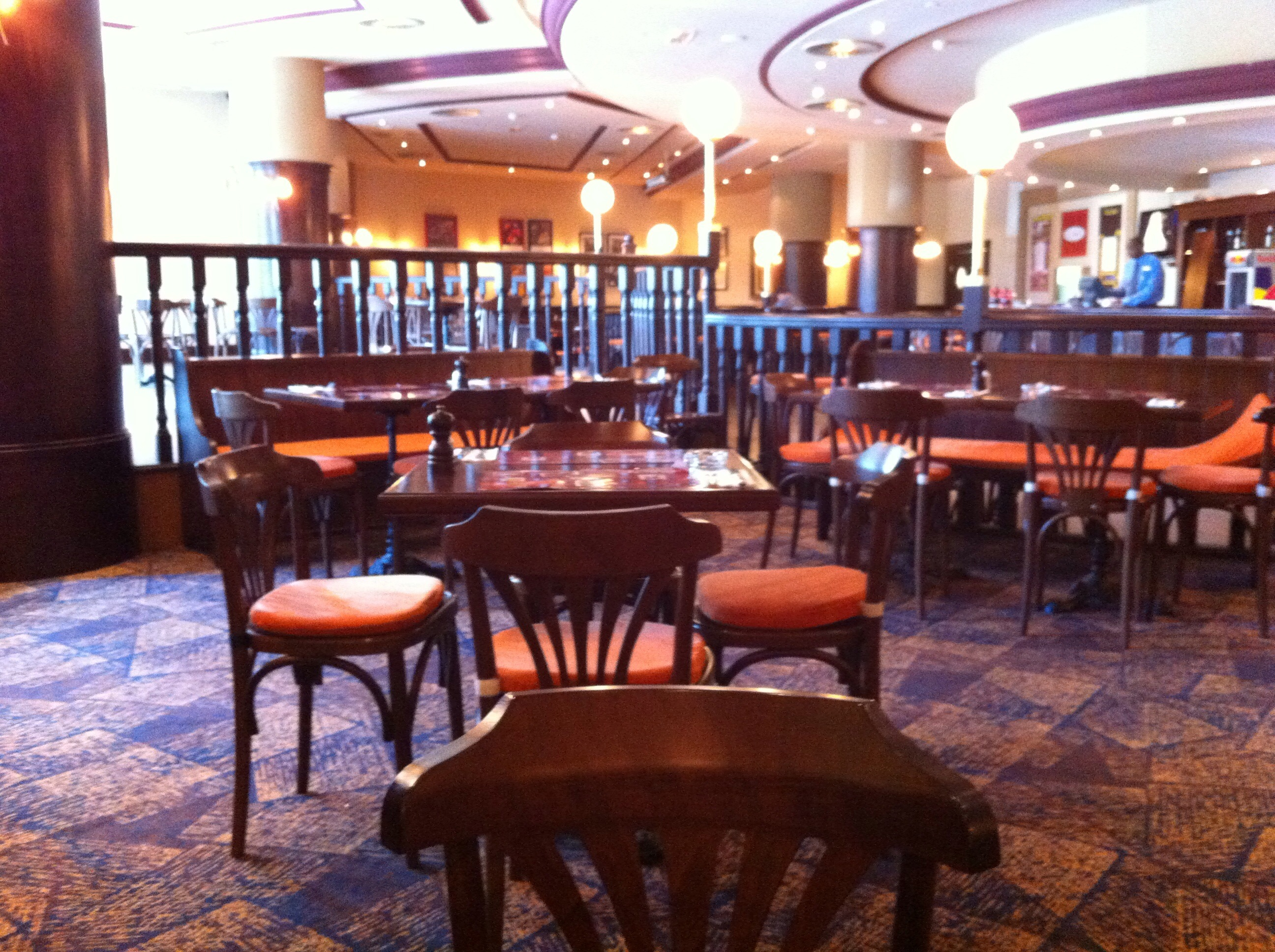
Restaurant in hotel

It has 18 guest floors, 173 rooms and 57 suites. The hotel has six restaurants and cafés and leisure facilities including spa, gym, tennis and squash courts.

== Owner ==
It was built and financed by the Libyan government at a cost of over 80 million euros. The building has an oval curved facade; like the Burj al Arab, the Yyldyz Hotel, and the Grand Millennium in Sulaymaniyah. it was designed to resemble a ship's sail, though its ovoid shape and Libyan funding have led to the nickname of "Gaddafi's Egg."
