= Corinthia Hotel St. Petersburg =

Hotel in Saint Petersburg, Russia

Coordinates: 59.9320°N 30.3509°E

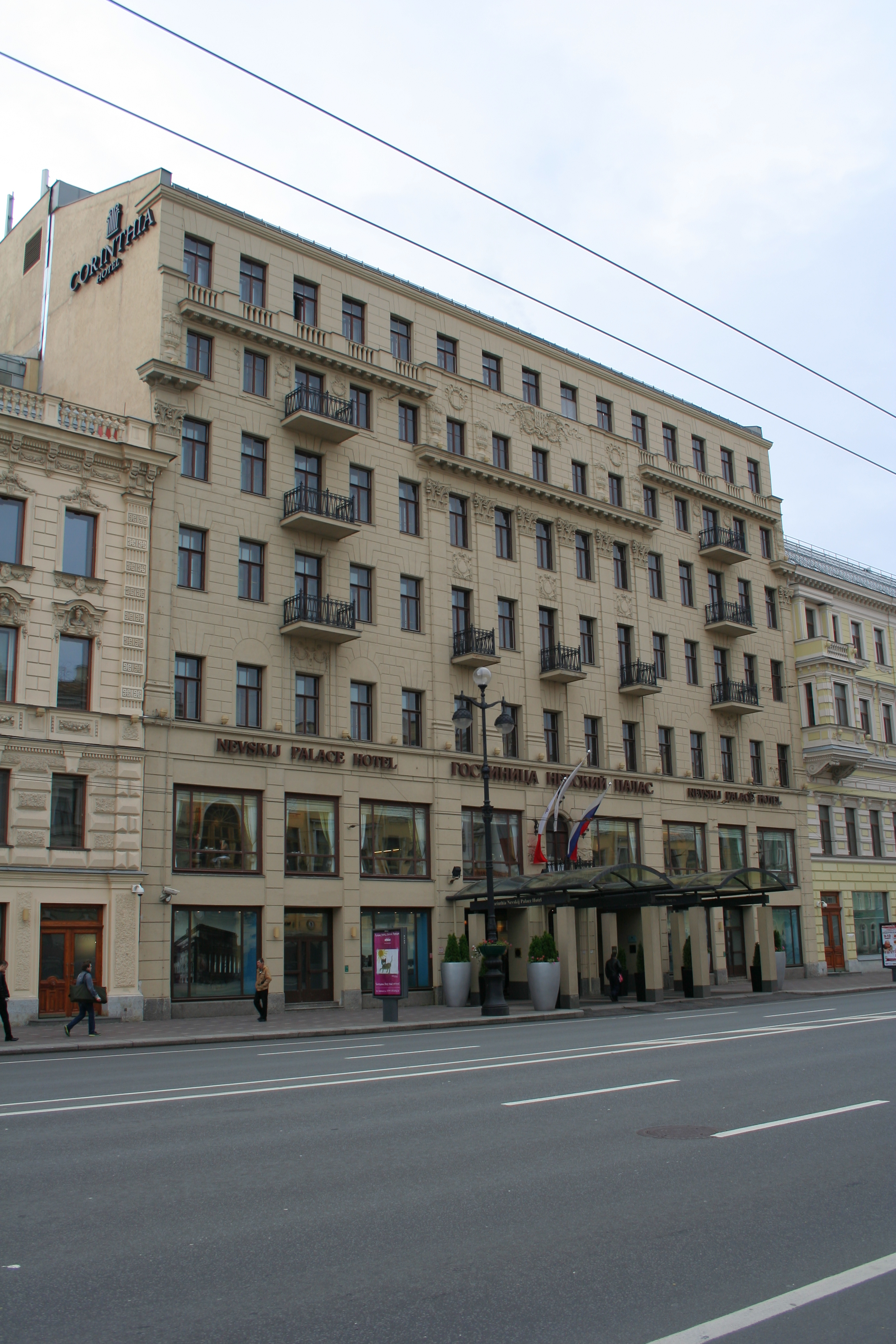
- Interactive map of the Corinthia Hotel St. Petersburg area
- Hotel chain: Corinthia Hotels

General information
- Location: St. Petersburg, Russia, 57 Nevsky Prospect
- Opening: 1993
- Management: Corinthia Hotels

Other information
- Number of rooms: 387
- Number of restaurants: 2

The Corinthia Hotel St. Petersburg, formerly the Nevskij Palace Hotel (known in Russian as Невский Палас), is a five-star hotel in Saint Petersburg, Russia. It is located on Nevsky Prospect about 800 meters from the Moscow railway station.

It underwent an enlargement, during which two historical buildings on either side were restored and joined to the complex to serve as a 7,000 square metres (75,000 sq ft) office building, and a 10,000 square metres (110,000 sq ft) trading center.

The building project was run by Arup with large-scale reconstruction works while maintaining the facade of the building (the facade of the building stands on rubble foundations, with beds laid 1.7 m deep), which led to cracks in neighboring buildings. During the installation of piles for the wall in the soil under the protective pipe, the weak water-saturated soil destructured when the pipe was immersed (the pipe was immersed by vibration) and began to flow into the pipe. The reason was that drilling was carried out to the bottom of the pipe (3–4 meters from the bottom of the pipe were not left to counteract the swimming of the soil), which also led to the fact that the volume of excavated soil significantly exceeded the volume of concrete that was pumped into the pipe. There was a vibration of the piles, the cracks that arose during the construction of the piles opened. House 59 on Nevsky Prospekt received a draft of 13 cm, house 55 on Nevsky Prospekt received an additional draft. draft 17 cm. and it had to be destroyed.

== Refurbishment ==
Goddard Littlefair, a London-based interior design studio, is working on a two-phase refurbishment that will seek to raise the hotel's profile and follow on from the success of Corinthia, London, unifying the structures via a modern and luxurious treatment, with light touches of art deco-era inspiration.

As part of the refurbishment, the restaurant is being redesigned as an all-day-dining, destination restaurant offer, with an elegant brasserie feel and strong Art Deco references that correlate with the rest of the hotel interior. The design treatment offers segmented and more secluded areas, so that diners in smaller groups could experience a sense of intimacy, set within a typically high-style Corinthia environment.
