= Corinthia Hotel Tripoli =

Five star skyscraper hotel in Tripoli, Libya

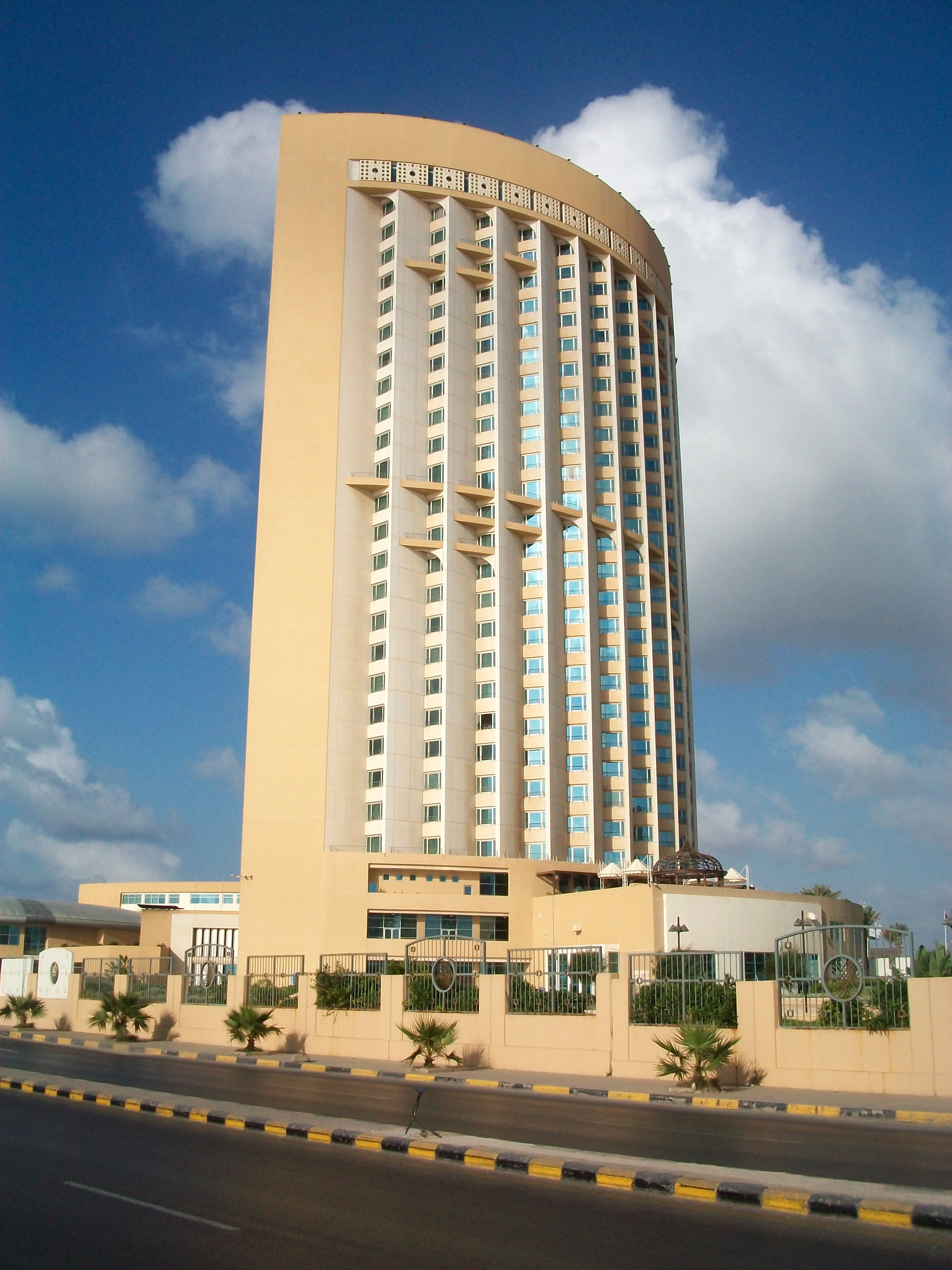
- The Corinthia Hotel main tower.

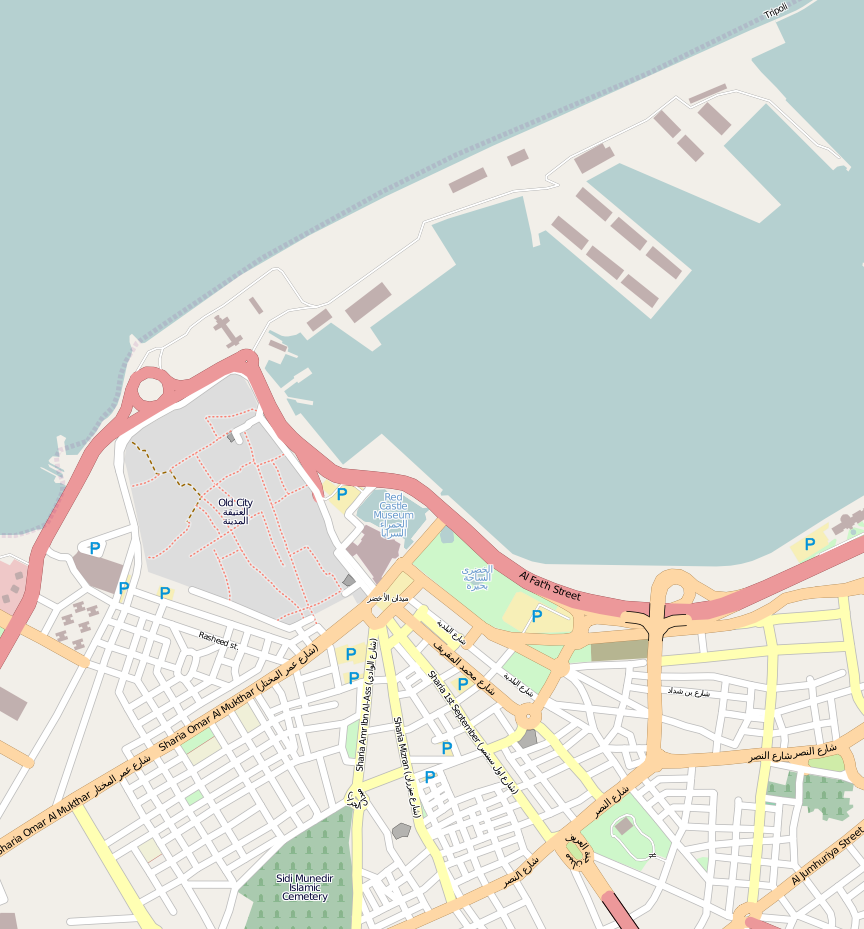
- Location within Tripoli, Libya
- Hotel chain: Corinthia Hotels

General information
- Location: Tripoli, Libya, Souk Al Thulatha Al Gadim
- Coordinates: 32°53′50″N 13°10′13″E
- Opening: 2003
- Owner: IHI PLC
- Operator: Corinthia Hotels

Height
- Height: 394 ft (120 m)

Technical details
- Floor count: 28 (tower 1), 14 (tower 2)

Other information
- Number of rooms: 319
- Number of restaurants: 4

The Corinthia Hotel Tripoli, originally known as the Corinthia Bab Africa Hotel, is a five-star skyscraper hotel in Tripoli, Libya. It is located in the city center, near the central business district. It is run by the Maltese Corinthia Hotels International (CHI) plc hotels management company. The hotel was opened in 2003 by Prime Minister, Shukri Ghanem [More information required].

== 2015 terror attack ==
On 27 January 2015 ten people, including five foreigners from France, Italy, Turkey, United Kingdom and the American Crucible LLC security contractor David Berry, were killed in a gun attack. Prior to this attack, six people were injured in a car bomb explosion near the hotel. A group of militants allegedly affiliated with the Islamic State claimed responsibility for the attack. The group, which called itself Islamic State in Tripoli Province, stated it was to avenge the death of Abu Anas al-Libi.
