= Corinthia Hotel Budapest =

Building in Budapest, Hungary

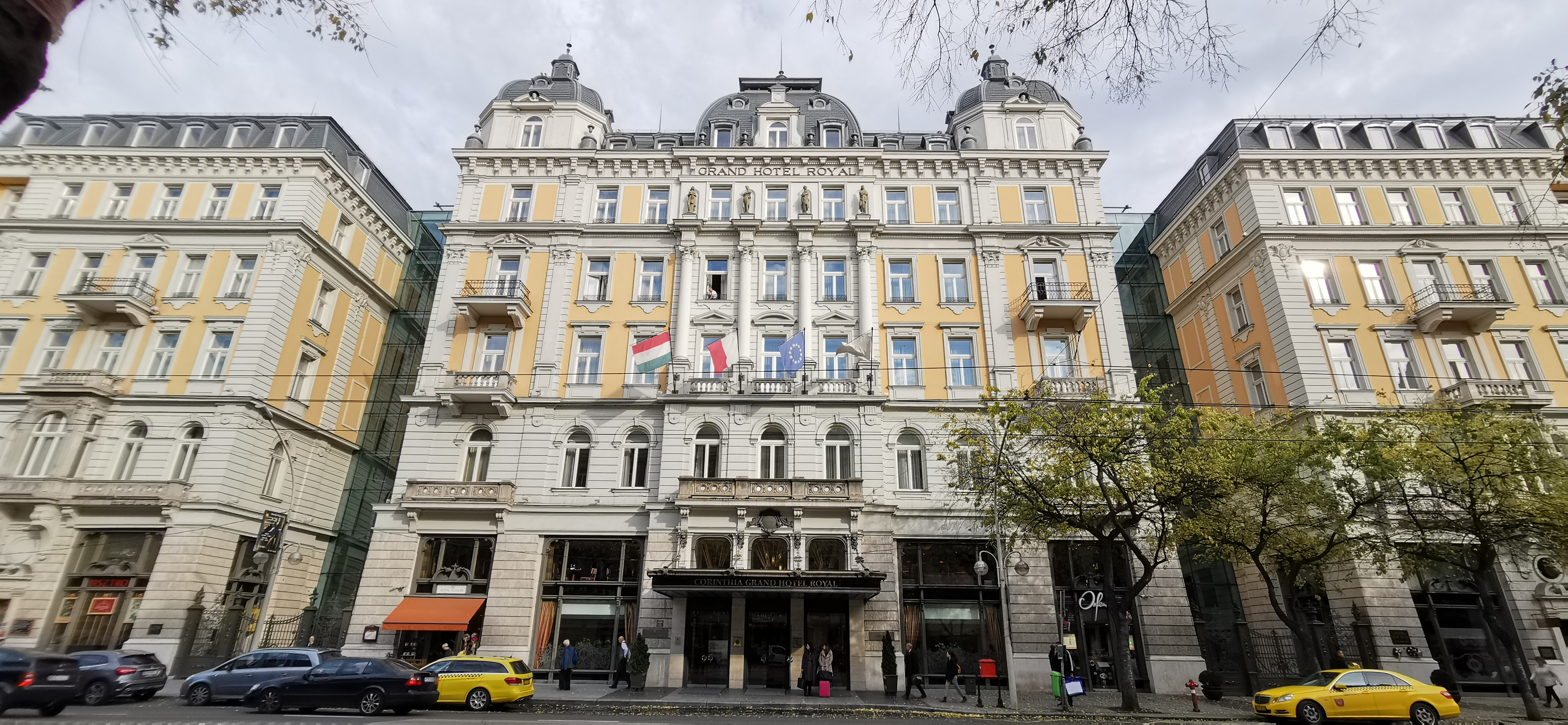
- Interactive map of the Corinthia Hotel Budapest area
- Hotel chain: Corinthia Hotels International

General information
- Location: Budapest, HU, Erzsebet krt 43–49
- Coordinates: 47.5027°N 19.0668°E
- Opening: 30 April 1896, restored in 2003
- Owner: Corinthia Hotels International
- Operator: Corinthia Hotels International

Technical details
- Floor count: 6

Other information
- Number of rooms: 414
- Number of suites: 31
- Number of restaurants: 6

The Corinthia Hotel Budapest at the Elizabeth Boulevard in Budapest, is a historic luxury hotel. Opened in 1896 as the Grand Hotel Royal, a hub for the elite of 19th century society, the hotel has undergone extensive modification throughout the 20th century, and has in the 21st century been restored and reopened as the Corinthia.

== History ==
=== Location ===
The course of the Grand Boulevard (Nagykörút) was marked out during the 1870s, together with Andrássy Avenue, Budapest's most impressive avenue. The road went through a thinly populated part of suburban Budapest, so its development was slow, and only a few buildings were constructed in the 1870s. The real development of the Grand Boulevard began once Andrássy Street was completed in 1884. A joint-stock company was established by the hotel owners, including the chairman Mr. Frigyes Glück and architect Mr. Rezső Ray, which purchased the largest piece of real estate on the developing Grand Boulevard, which was becoming the main artery of the capital city.

=== Grand Hotel Royal ===
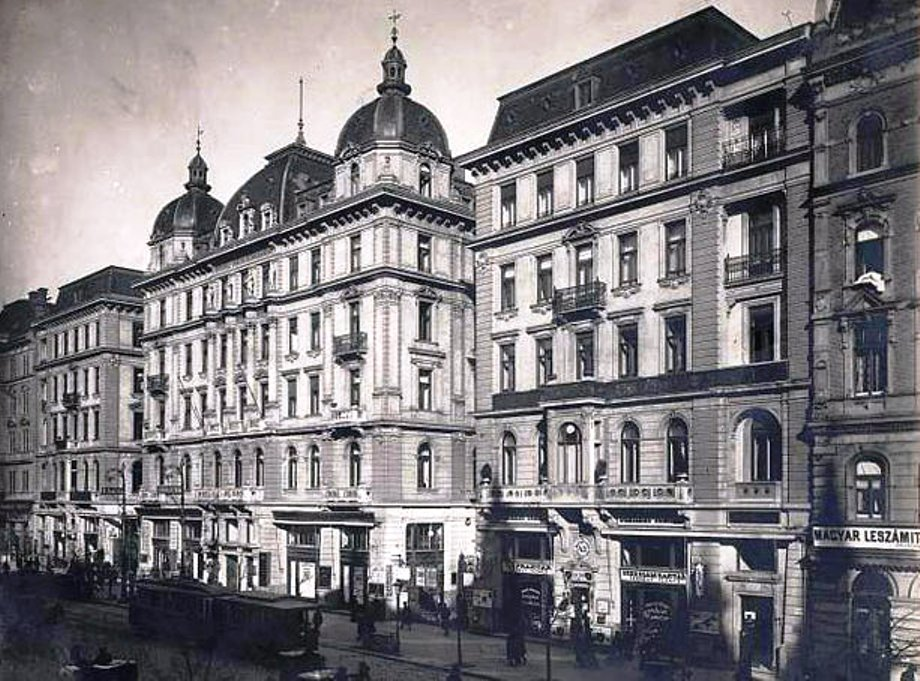
Grand Hotel Royal, 1900

The Grand Hotel Royal opened 30 April 1896, to serve visitors attending the Millennium Exhibition, which celebrated the 1000th anniversary of crowning the first Hungarian king. The hotel rooms enjoyed superb views of this most attractive part of Budapest. The 350-hotel was designed in the French Renaissance style and included an adjacent building and attic rooms for servants.

Guests had access to two restaurants, a café, a Gerbeaud confectionery, private dining rooms, a post office, a bank, a hairdresser, and a ticket office. A grocery store and a bar were located in the cellar. In the western cour d'honneur, a palm garden made the court more attractive. After its opening, the Royal became a regular haunt of contemporary Hungarian writers and journalists, including Jenő Heltay, Sándor Hunyadi, Lajos Nagy and Gyula Krúdy.

The first screening of a motion picture in Budapest, by the Lumiére brothers, took place at the hotel. Several classical concerts were held in the Royal Ballroom, and Béla Bartók, the Hungarian composer, frequently conducted music there. The Royal soon became a topic of journalists. In 1909, the first Hungarian airplane was exhibited in one of the hotel's cour d'honneur. With the growing popularity of movies, the hotel's ballroom was rebuilt as the Royal Apollo cinema.

=== Decline, fall and rise ===
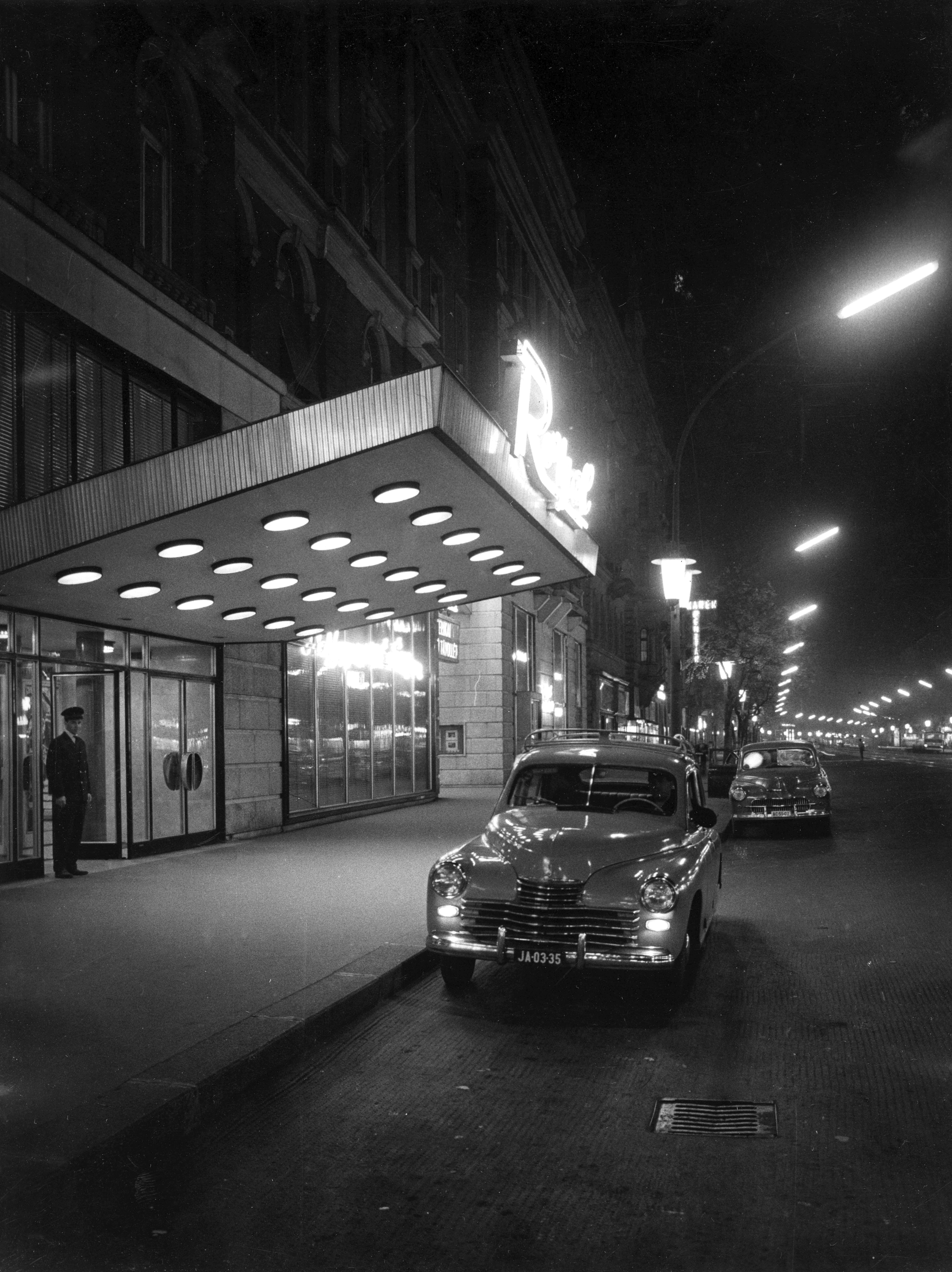
Grand Hotel Royal entrance, 1960s

The hotel was badly damaged in World War II. It gradually reopened after the war, and by 1953 there were 170 hotel rooms on two floors, while the rest of the building contained offices. The hotel was again badly damaged during the 1956 Hungarian Revolution, when organizers of the revolt gathered in the building, and Soviet tanks shelled it on 4 November 1956. The Hungarian communist government rebuilt the hotel with completely modern interiors, designed by architect István Janáky, that fit with the 'space idealism' of the time. The movie theater in the hotel's old ballroom reopened in 1959 as the Red Star cinema, with its entrance on Hársfa Street. The Grand Hotel Royal reopened on 20 August 1961, with 367 guest rooms.

By the late 1980s, the aging state-run hotel had become obsolete and with the end of communism in Hungary, the Grand Hotel Royal closed in October 1991, although the cinema continued operating until autumn 1997.

=== Corinthia era ===
The hotel was completely gutted and rebuilt behind the historic facade by the Corinthia Group, a Maltese-based investment group that operates hotels throughout Europe and the Mediterranean. The €100 million restoration was the largest hotel refurbishment project in Hungarian history at the time. The former cinema was restored to its original use as the hotel's ballroom, the only portion of the original 1896 interior decor remaining. The Corinthia Grand Hotel Royal opened on 30 April 2003.

== Royal Spa ==
The spa was planned and built by the architect Vilmos Freund in 1886–88. At that time it contained steam baths, wave and shower baths, electric baths, pneumatic chamber and a medical room with cold water. Contemporary journalists were fascinated by the spa's appearance. In 1903 direct access was created for hotel guests. After the First World War, Freund was declared bankrupt, and his heirs sold the spa in 1923 to the Royal Nagyszálló Rt. The spa operated until 1944 but from that time it has been closed. The abandoned, obsolete spa was rediscovered in 1983 and, according to the original documents, there were plans to use the spa area for parking facilities. János Dianóczki, who was in charge of planning the multi-storey car park, turned down the proposal. The media and the public supported him, and his decision made it possible for the current owners to restore the spa today.

== Famous guests ==
The original visitor's book contains the signatures of some of the most important people from Europe and the rest of the world. Just a few examples are Max Reinhardt, Asta Nielsen, Saljapin, Valdemar Psylander, Professor Barnard, Roberto Benzi, Mario del Monaco, Anna Moffo, Renata Scotto, Elisabeth Schwarzkopf, Amerigo Tot, Valentina Tereskova, Jane Napp and Kristo Priimägi.
