= Corinthia Hotels =

Hotel management company

- Industry: Hospitality
- Founded: 1962
- Founder: Alfred Pisani
- Headquarters: Floriana, Malta
- Number of locations: 23 hotels in 16 countries (2022)

Corinthia Hotels Limited (CHL), formerly Corinthia Hotels International, based in Malta, is the operator and developer for Corinthia hotels in Europe, Africa and The Middle East. CHL operates restaurants such as Rickshaw, and has a spa division. It is wholly owned by International Hotel Investments (IHI), which is part of the Corinthia Group of Companies.

== History ==
Founded by Alfred Pisani and his family in Malta in 1962 the inaugural hotel, Corinthia Palace Hotel & Spa in Attard, was first opened as a restaurant and was later developed into a hotel. Pisani has been chairman since the company's inception.

Corinthia has hotels in locations including London, Budapest, Prague, Saint Petersburg, Lisbon, Malta and Tripoli. Projects under the Corinthia Hotels brand are under development in Brussels, Dubai, Bucharest.

== Properties ==
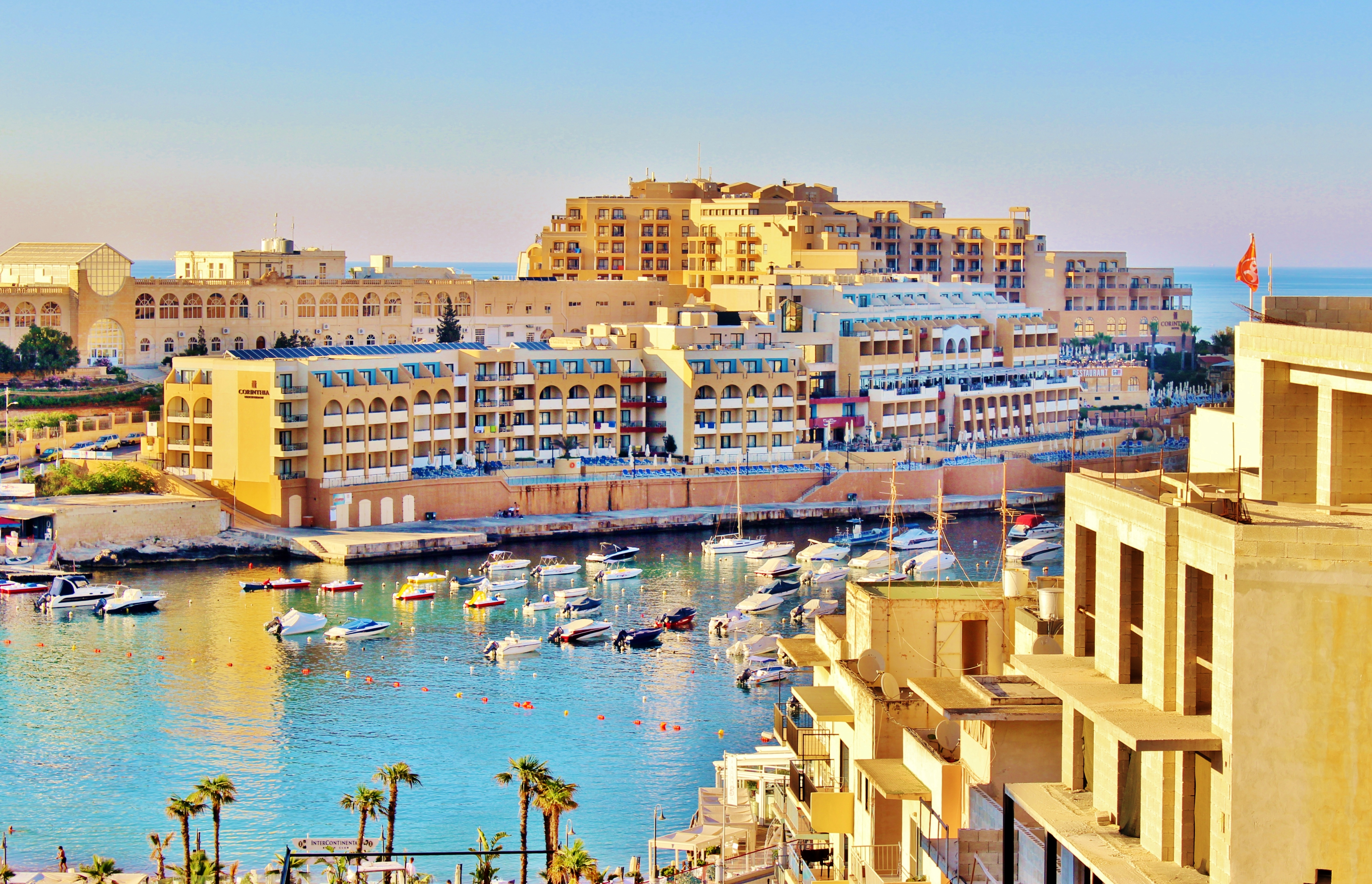
Corinthia in St. Julian's, Malta

=== Current ===
- Corinthia Brussels - Brussels, Belgium
- Corinthia London - London, United Kingdom
- Corinthia St. Petersburg - St Petersburg, Russia
- Corinthia Budapest - Budapest, Hungary
- Corinthia Grand Hotel du Boulevard Bucharest – Bucharest, Romania
- Corinthia Tripoli - Tripoli, Libya
- Corinthia Lisbon - Lisbon, Portugal
- Corinthia Prague - Prague, Czech Republic
- Corinthia St George's Bay - St Julian's, Malta
- Corinthia Palace Hotel & Spa - San Anton, Attard, Malta
- The Surrey - A Corinthia Hotel - New York, NY, USA

=== Independent hotels ===
- The Aquincum Hotel Budapest - Budapest, Hungary
- Ramada Plaza Tunis - Carthage, Tunisia
- Marina Hotel Corinthia Beach Resort - St Julian's, Malta
- Raddison Blu Resort & Spa, Golden Sands Malta
- Raddison Blu Resort, St Julian's Malta
- Panorama Hotel - Prague, Czech Republic
