= Corinthia Group of Companies =

Maltese hotel company

Corinthia Group Of Companies
- Company type: Public (IHI)
- Traded as: MSE: IHI
- Industry: Hospitality
- Founded: Malta (1960)
- Headquarters: Floriana, Malta
- Key people: Alfred Pisani (chairman & CEO); Yousef Abdelmaula (vice-chairman)
- Website: CorinthiaCorporate.com

The Corinthia Group is the parent company to Corinthia Hotels International. The group is an international investor, developer, and operator of upscale hotels and resorts in Europe and Africa.

== History ==
The Corinthia Group's success began with prominent hotelier Alfred Pisani, who developed one of Malta's first deluxe hotels on a family-owned estate. The original Corinthia Palace Hotel was opened in Malta in 1968 by the Duke of Edinburgh. Pisani, as chairman and chief executive officer, has since expanded the company into a multinational competitive group comprising four subsidiary companies.

== Corporate structure ==
The Corinthia Group is made up of four main subsidiary companies, including the Corinthia Palace Hotel Company PLC, which is listed on the Malta Stock Exchange.

The Group comprises several subsidiary companies focusing on hotel management, construction, and property development. Notable projects include hotels in Malta, Prague, London, and other international locations.

=== Corinthia Hotels ===
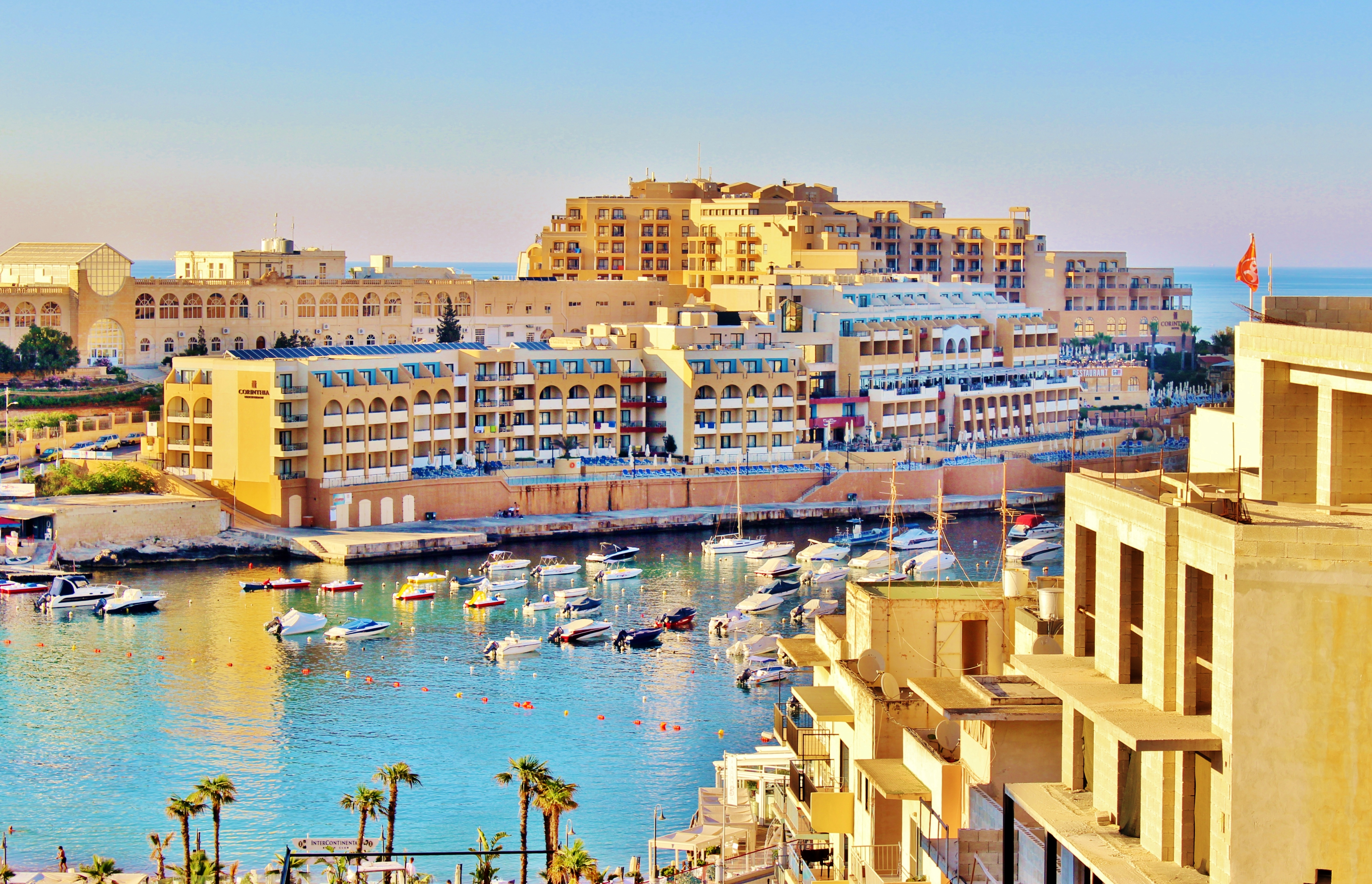
Corinthia Hotel in St. Julian's, Malta

Corinthia Hotels Limited (CHL) operates hotels under the Corinthia brand across Europe, Africa, and the Middle East. The company is owned by the Pisani family through its stake in International Hotel Investments plc (IHI), full owner of CHI. CHI manages hotels in the United Kingdom, Czech Republic, Hungary, Malta, Portugal, Russia, The Gambia, Togo, Tunisia, and Turkey.

=== International Hotel Investments ===
International Hotel Investments (IHI), established by the Corinthia Group, is a prominent investor, developer and operator of upscale hotels in Europe, Africa, and the Mediterranean region. Following a successful IPO in April 2000, the company's shares were listed on the Malta Stock Exchange. Target acquisitions have typically involved hotels that are, or have the potential to become, the top five-star properties in their respective locations.

=== Quality Project Management ===
QPM Limited, established in 1981, has developed into a leading international project management organisation in Malta, having been entrusted with more than forty projects valued at over €1 billion.

=== Corinthia In-flight Services ===
Corinthia In-flight Services (CIS), established in 1974, has a production capacity exceeding one million meals annually. It caters to international airlines operating in and out of Europe, such as Lufthansa, British Airways, SAS, and Emirates, as well as providing catering for many VIP flights. CIS is also a member of the International Travel Catering Association.
