= Cameron =

Cameron may refer to:

== People ==
- Clan Cameron, a Scottish clan
- Cameron (given name), a given name (including a list of people with the name)
- Cameron (surname), a surname (including a list of people with the name)
- Cameron (actress) (born 1953), American model and actress
- Cameron (musician) (born 1978), Iranian-born Swedish pop singer and songwriter
- Cameron (wrestler), ring name of professional wrestler Ariane Andrew (born 1987)
- Marjorie Cameron (1922–1995), occultist and actress who billed herself as "Cameron"

== Places ==
=== Canada ===
- Cameron, Manitoba
- Cameron, Peterborough County, Ontario
- Cameron, Ontario, an unincorporated village in the City of Kawartha Lakes
- Cameron Township, Quebec, merged in 1980 with Bouchette, Quebec
- Cameron Settlement, Nova Scotia
- Cameron Bay

=== Chile ===
- Camerón, Chile

=== Malaysia ===
- Cameron Highlands, Pahang
  - Cameron Highlands (federal constituency)

=== Scotland ===
- Cameron, Fife, a parish near St Andrews
- Cameron Bridge, a village in Fife

=== United States ===
- Cameron, Arizona
- Cameron, Illinois
- Cameron, Iowa, an unincorporated community in Cerro Gordo County
- Cameron, Louisiana
- Cameron, Montana
- Cameron, Missouri
- Cameron, New York
- Cameron, North Carolina
- Cameron, Ohio
- Cameron, Oklahoma
- Cameron, South Carolina
- Cameron, Texas
- Cameron, West Virginia
- Cameron, Wisconsin (disambiguation)
- Cameron County, Pennsylvania
- Cameron County, Texas
- Cameron Parish, Louisiana
- Cameron Parish, Virginia, a defunct Anglican parish in Fairfax and Loudoun Counties
- Cameron Township (disambiguation)

== Businesses ==
- Cameron (automobile), an American automobile manufacturer 1904–1921
- Cameron Balloons, a balloon manufacturing company in Bristol, England
- Cameron Coca-Cola, a bottling company
- Cameron International, an oil services company
- Cameron Chisholm Nicol, an Australian architecture firm

== Other uses ==
- Cameron (Terminator), a fictional character
- Cameron (crater), a lunar crater
- Cameron University, Lawton, Oklahoma
- Battery Cameron, a Union Army defensive site during the Civil War
- Cameron Airpark, a public use airport located in Cameron Park, California, United States
- Cameron Art Museum, formerly known as St. John's Museum of Art, Wilmington, North Carolina
- Cameron Barracks, on Knockentinnel Hill on the eastern outskirts of Inverness, Scotland
- Cameron Blockhouse, a timber blockhouse in Wanganui, New Zealand
- Cameron City Pool, a historic swimming pool located at Cameron, Marshall County, West Virginia

== See also ==
- Cameron Park, New South Wales, Australia, a suburb
- Cam'ron (born 1976), stage name of hip hop artist Cameron Giles
- Cameroon (disambiguation)
- Camarón (disambiguation)
