= Cameron Township =

Cameron Township may refer to the following townships in the United States:

- Cameron Township, Audubon County, Iowa
- Cameron Township, Murray County, Minnesota
- Cameron Township, Hall County, Nebraska

== See also ==
- Camerontown, a British Army supply depot used during the invasion of the Waikato during the New Zealand Wars
- East Cameron Township, Northumberland County, Pennsylvania
- West Cameron Township, Pennsylvania
