= Cameroon (disambiguation) =

Cameroon is a country in central Africa.

Cameroon may also refer to:

- Kamerun or German Cameroon, a German colony between 1884 and 1916
- Cameroun or French Cameroons, a French colony between 1920 and 1960
- British Cameroons, a British colony between 1922 and 1961
- Mount Cameroon, a volcano in Cameroon
- Cameroon sheep, an African breed of sheep
- Cameroons, supporters of David Cameron

== See also ==
- Camarón (disambiguation)
- Cameron (disambiguation)
