= Briconet Redoubt =

- Ridott ta' Briconet
- Marsaskala, Malta
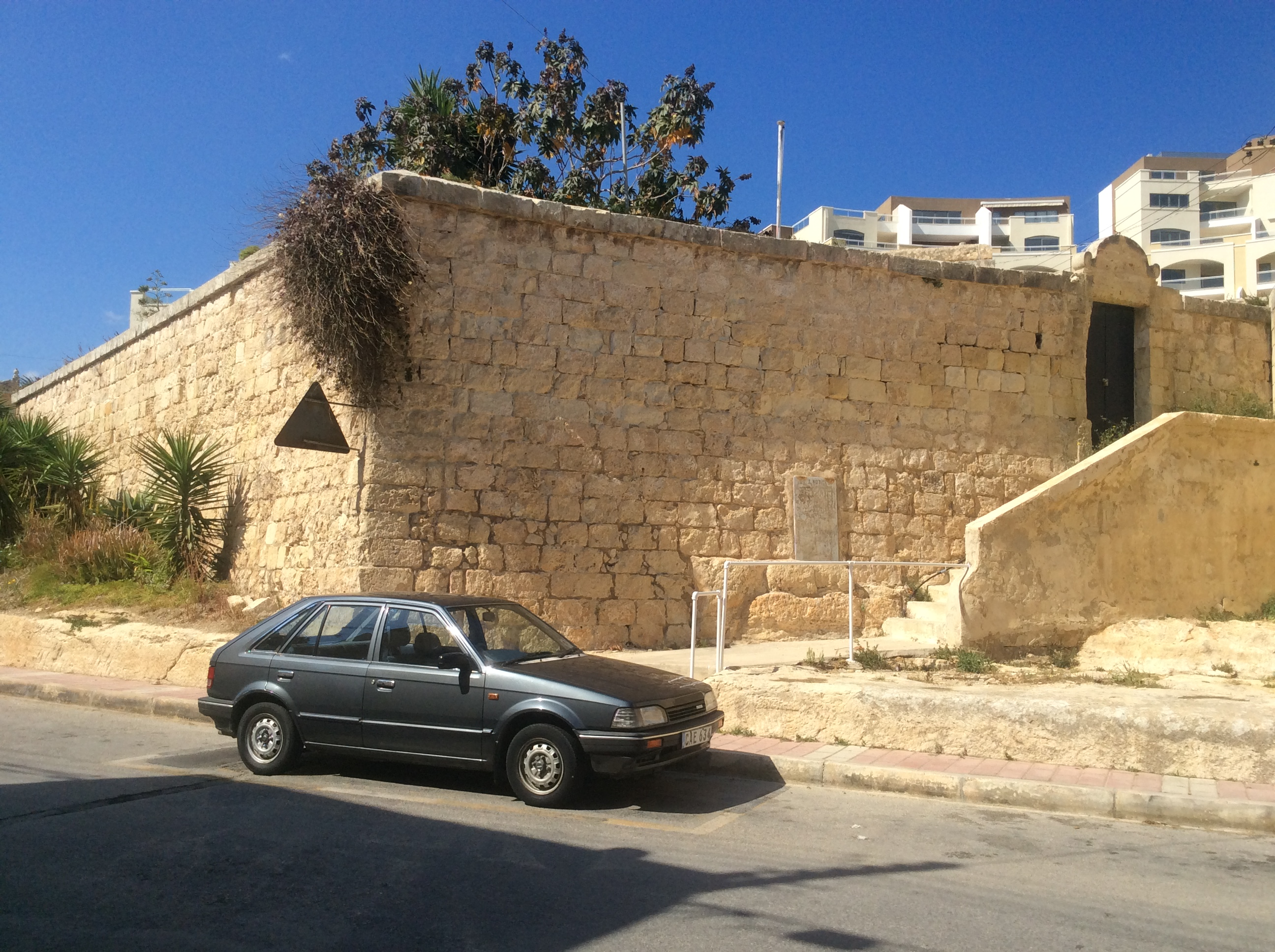
- View of Briconet Redoubt

Site information
- Type: Redoubt
- Owner: Government of Malta
- Controlled by: Police Department; Scout Association of Malta
- Open to the public: No
- Condition: Intact

Location
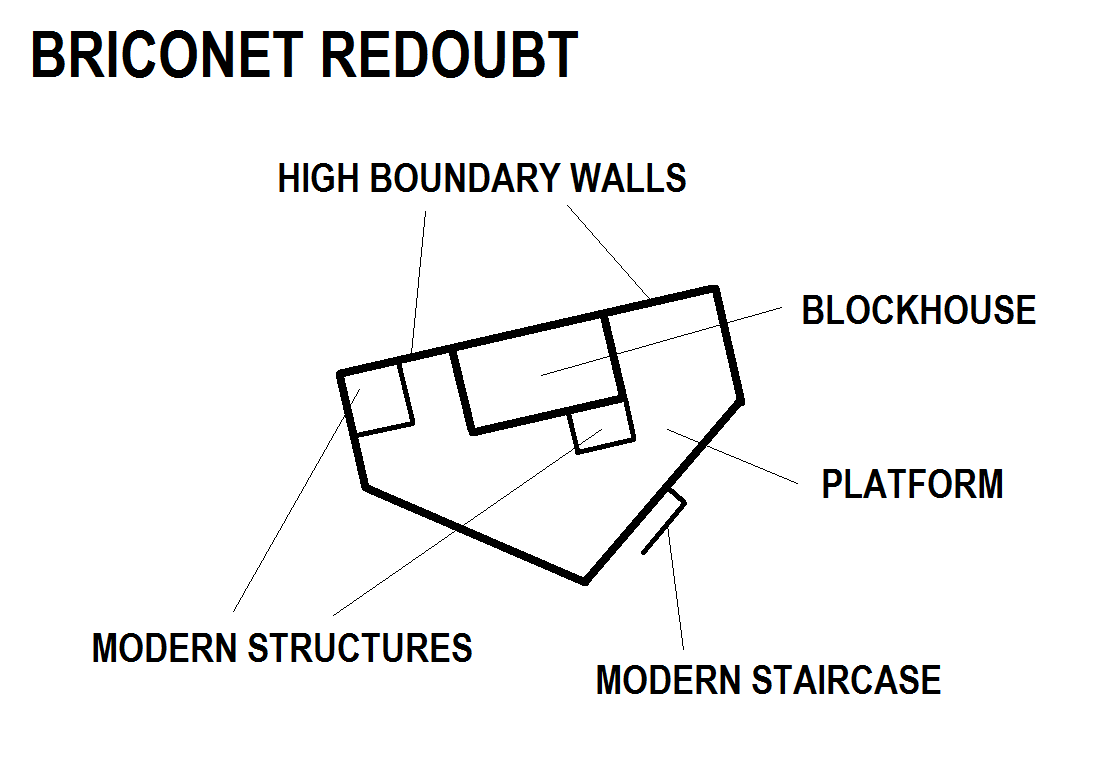
- Map of Briconet Redoubt
- Coordinates: 35°51′56.2″N 14°33′54.8″E

Site history
- Built: 1715
- Built by: Order of Saint John
- Materials: Limestone

Garrison information
- Garrison: Żejtun Regiment

Briconet Redoubt (Maltese: Ridott ta' Briconet), also known as Marsaskala Redoubt (Maltese: Ridott ta' Marsaskala) or the Vendôme Entrenchment (Maltese: It-Trunċiera ta' Vandomu), is a redoubt in Marsaskala, Malta. It was built in 1715 by the Order of Saint John as one of a series of coastal fortifications around the Maltese Islands. Until recently, the redoubt was used as a police station.

== History ==
Briconet Redoubt was built in 1715 as part of the first building programme of coastal batteries and redoubts in Malta. It formed part of the defences of Marsaskala Bay, which also included the large St. Thomas Tower and Battery and the now-demolished Żonqor Tower.

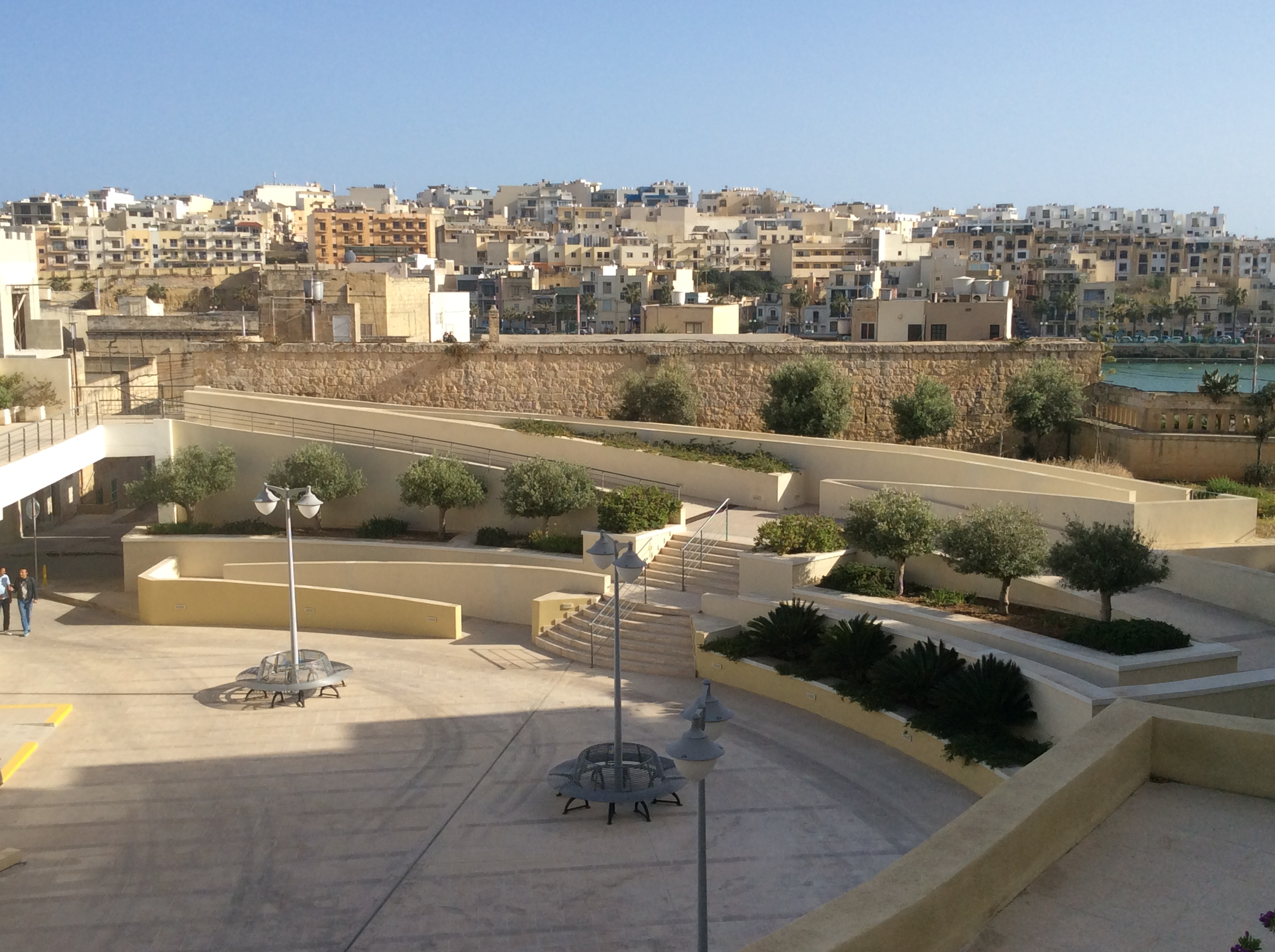
The redoubt viewed from the rear

Briconet Redoubt's structure is typical of most other coastal redoubts built in Malta. It consists of a pentagonal platform having short flanks, and a rectangular blockhouse sealing off the gorge. Unlike other Maltese redoubts, the gorge and flanks have high boundary walls pierced by musketry loopholes. These were built to defend the redoubt from a landward attack, since it is overlooked by high ground.

Construction of the redoubt cost 768 scudi. These were paid by the knight Giovanni Battista Briconet, and the redoubt was named in his honour. The redoubt was initially garrisoned by militia from Żejtun, and was armed with two cannons.

== Present day ==
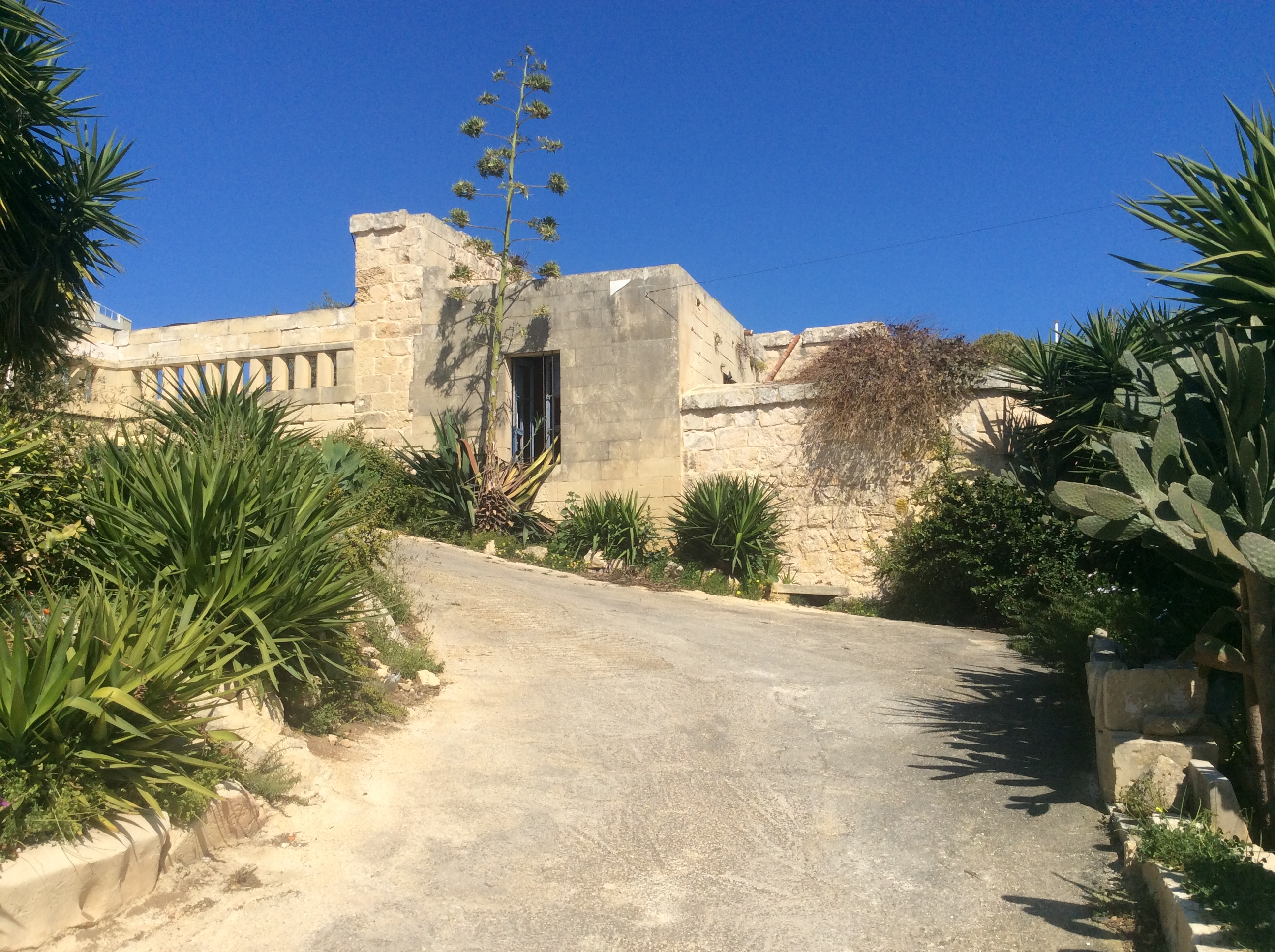
View of the redoubt with one of the modern structures visible

Briconet Redoubt is still intact and in good condition, being one of the best preserved redoubts in Malta. A few modern modifications have been made, such as the opening of a small doorway on one of its faces to enable access from the modern road. The redoubt is surrounded by modern buildings, including Marsaskala's parish church, which have completely blocked its relation with the sea.

Until the early 21st century, Briconet Redoubt was used as the Marsaskala Police Station, until this was moved to an irregular structure in a garden next to the church. Today, the redoubt is a Grade 1 national monument and is also listed on the National Inventory of the Cultural Property of the Maltese Islands.
