= Camarón =

Camarón may refer to:

- Cape Camarón, a cape on the Caribbean coast of Honduras
- Battle of Camarón, an 1863 battle, part of the French intervention in Mexico
- "Camarón", a song by Paco de lucía from Luzia, 1998

== People with the given name ==
- Camaron Cheeseman (born 1998), American football player
- Camarón de la Isla (1950–1992), Spanish flamenco singer

== Food ==
- Camarón various Mexican and South American dishes with shrimp. See List of Mexican dishes, Chilean cuisine

== See also ==
- Camarón de Tejeda, a town in the Mexican state of Veracruz
- Camaron rebosado, a Philippine dish with deep-fried battered shrimp
- Cameroon (disambiguation)
- Cameron (disambiguation)
