= Blockhouse =

Type of fortification

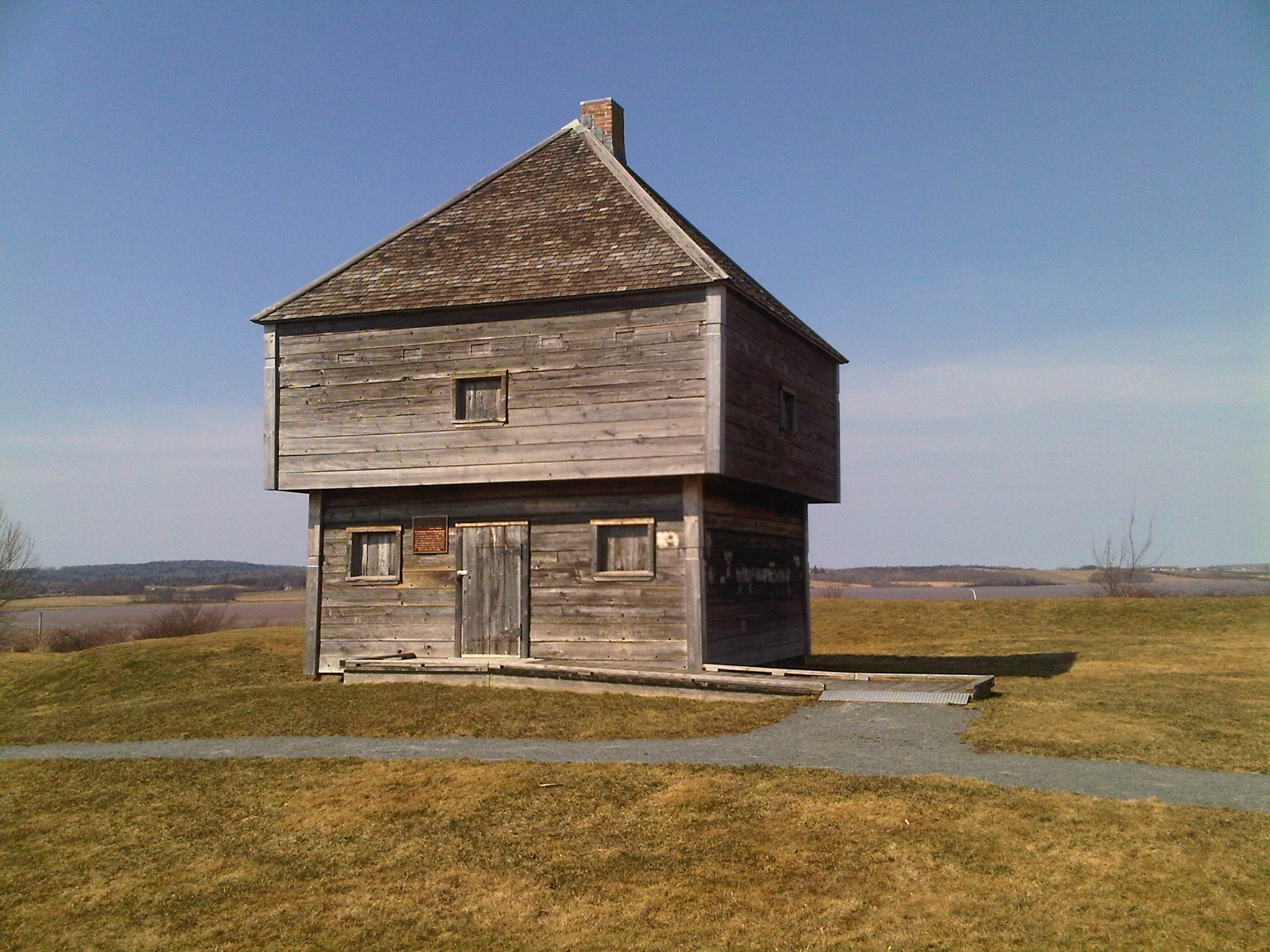
Completed in 1750, Fort Edward, Nova Scotia in Canada is the oldest remaining military blockhouse in North America.

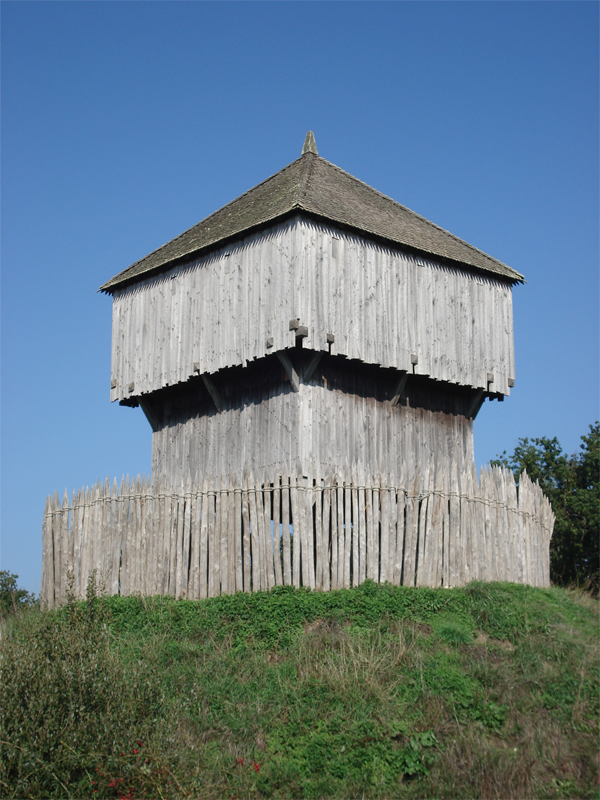
Reconstructed European wooden keep at Saint-Sylvain-d'Anjou, France, has a strong resemblance to a North American western frontier log blockhouse

A blockhouse is a small fortification, usually consisting of one or more rooms with loopholes, allowing its defenders to fire in various directions. It is usually an isolated fort in the form of a single building, serving as a defensive strong point against any enemy that does not possess siege equipment or, in modern times, artillery, air force or cruise missiles. A fortification intended to resist these weapons is more likely to qualify as a fortress or a redoubt, or in modern times, be an underground bunker. However, a blockhouse may also refer to a room within a larger fortification, usually a battery or redoubt.

== Etymology ==
The term blockhouse is of uncertain origin, perhaps related to Middle Dutch blokhus and 18th-century French blocus (blockade).

== In ancient Greece ==
Blockhouses existed in ancient Greece, for example the one near Mycenae.

== Early blockhouses in England ==
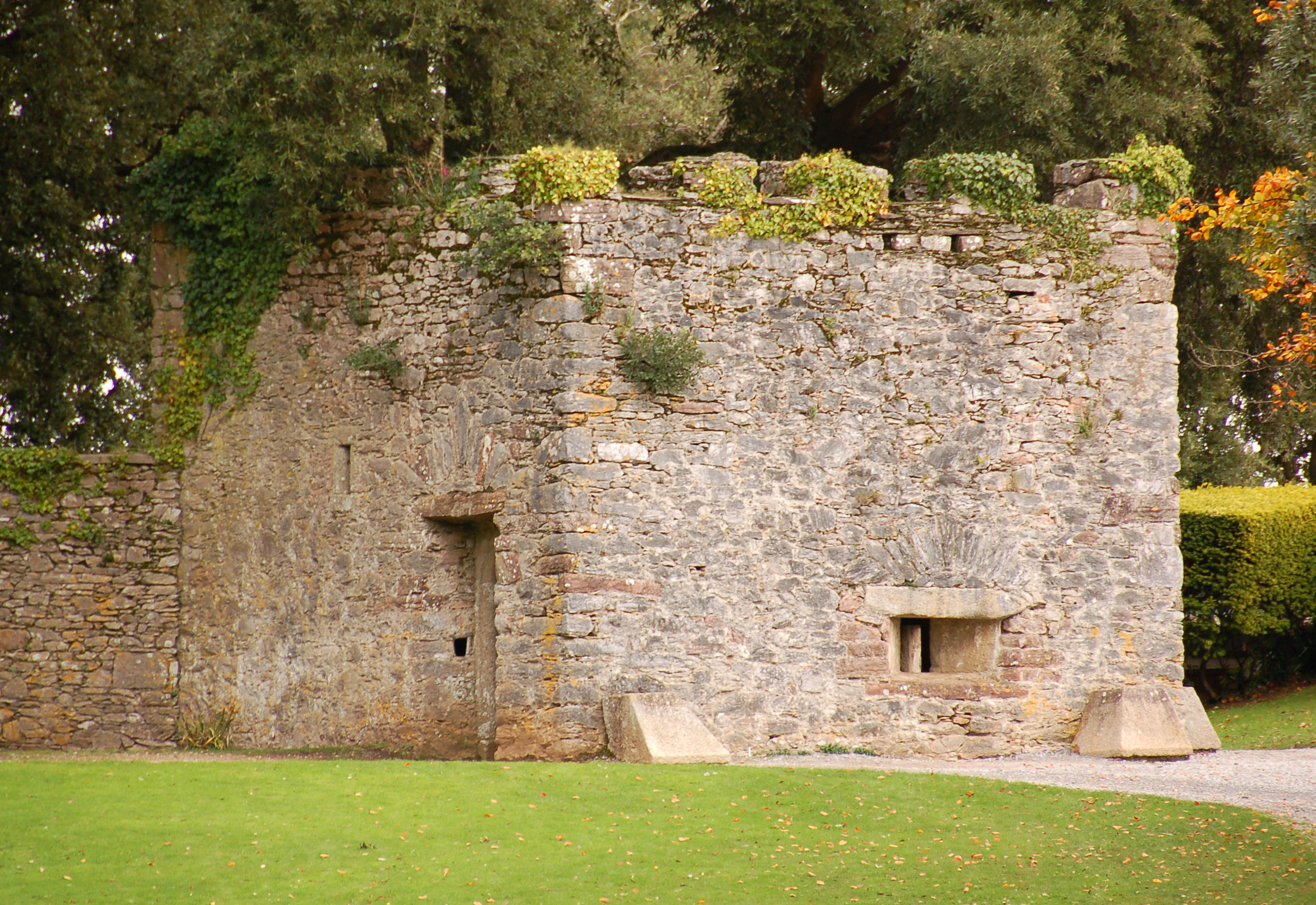
The Henrican blockhouse at Mount Edgcumbe near Plymouth, Devon, which is believed to date from circa 1545

Early blockhouses were designed solely to protect a particular area by the use of artillery, and they had accommodation only for the short-term use of the garrison. The first known example is the Cow Tower, Norwich, built in 1398, which was of brick and had three storeys with the upper storeys pierced for six guns each. The major period of construction was in the maritime defence programmes of Henry VIII between 1539 and 1545. They were built to protect important maritime approaches such as the Thames Estuary, the Solent, and Plymouth. Often sited in pairs, the blockhouses were not built to a common design, but usually consisted of a stone tower and bastion or gun platform, which could be semi-circular, rectangular or irregular in shape. The last blockhouse of this type was Cromwell's Castle, built in Scilly in 1651.

== Coastal fortifications in Malta ==
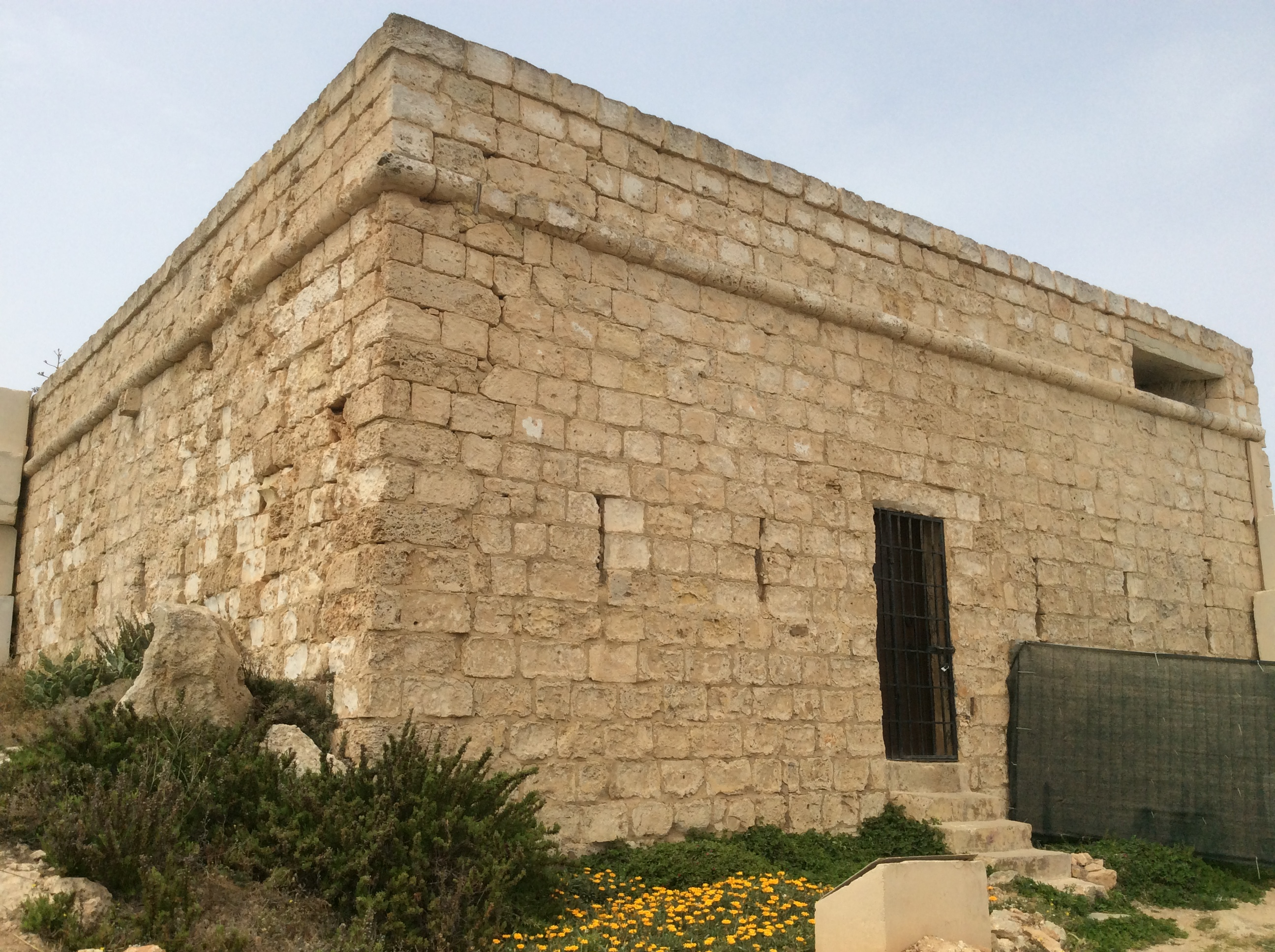
Blockhouse of Westreme Battery, built in 1715–16 in Mellieħa, Malta

Blockhouses were an ubiquitous feature in Malta's coastal fortifications built in the 18th century by the Order of St. John. Between 1714 and 1716, dozens of batteries and redoubts were built around the coasts of the Maltese Islands, while a few others were built in the subsequent decades. Almost every battery and redoubt had a blockhouse, which served as gun crew accommodation and a place to store munitions.

Many of the batteries consisted of a semi-circular or polygonal gun platform, with one or two blockhouses at the rear. The blockhouses usually had musketry loopholes, and in some cases were linked together by redans. Surviving batteries include Mistra Battery and Ferretti Battery, which both have two blockhouses, and Saint Mary's Battery and Saint Anthony's Battery, which have a single blockhouse.

Many of the redoubts consisted of a pentagonal platform with a rectangular blockhouse at the rear, although a few had semi-circular or rectangular platforms. Surviving redoubts with blockhouses include Baħar iċ-Ċagħaq Redoubt and Briconet Redoubt, both of which have a pentagonal plan. A few of the redoubts consisted of a single tower-like blockhouse without a platform, and were known as tour-reduits. Of the four tour-reduits that were built, only the Vendôme Tower survives today.

== Age of exploration ==
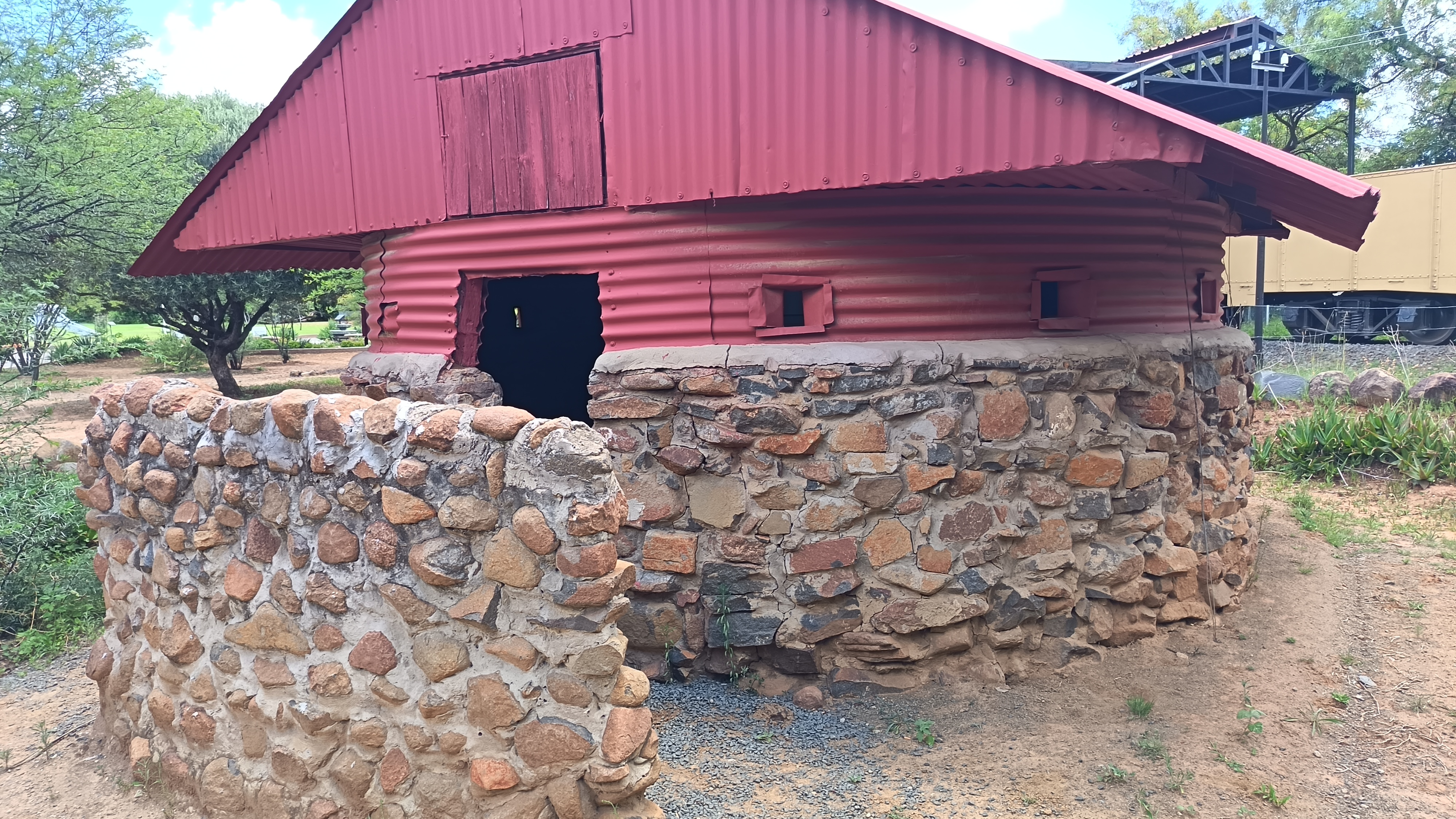
A replica of a Rice Blockhouse at the Anglo Boer War Museum, Bloemfontein, South Africa, 2025.

Originally blockhouses were often constructed as part of a large plan, to "block" access to vital points in the scheme. But from the Age of Exploration to the nineteenth century standard patterns of blockhouses were constructed for defence in frontier areas, particularly South Africa, New Zealand, Canada, and the United States. Blockhouses may be made of masonry where available, but were commonly made from very heavy timbers, sometimes even logs arranged in the manner of a log cabin. They were usually two or even three floors, with all storeys being provided with embrasures or loopholes, and the uppermost storey would be roofed. If the structure was of timber, usually the upper storey would project outward from the lower so the upper storey defenders could fire on enemies attacking the lower storey, or perhaps pour water on any fires. When the structure had only one storey, its loopholes were often placed close to the ceiling, with a bench lining the walls inside for defenders to stand on, so that attackers could not easily reach the loopholes.

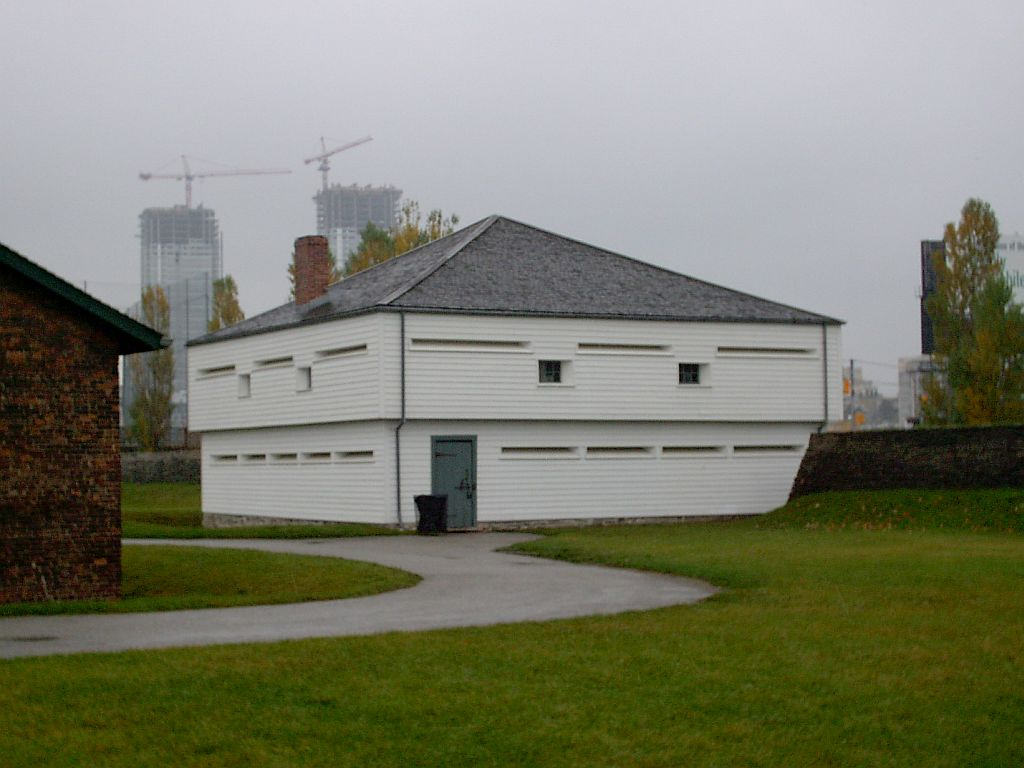
A 19th-century-era blockhouse in Fort York, Toronto

Blockhouses were normally entered via a sturdy, barred door at ground level. Most blockhouses were roughly square in plan, but some of the more elaborate ones were hexagonal or octagonal, to provide better all-around fire. In some cases, blockhouses became the basis for complete forts, by building a palisade with the blockhouse at one corner, and possibly a second tower at the opposite corner. Many historical stone blockhouses have survived, and a few timber ones have been restored at historical sites. In New Zealand, the Cameron Blockhouse, near Whanganui, is one of the few blockhouses to survive from the New Zealand Wars.

== Second Boer War ==
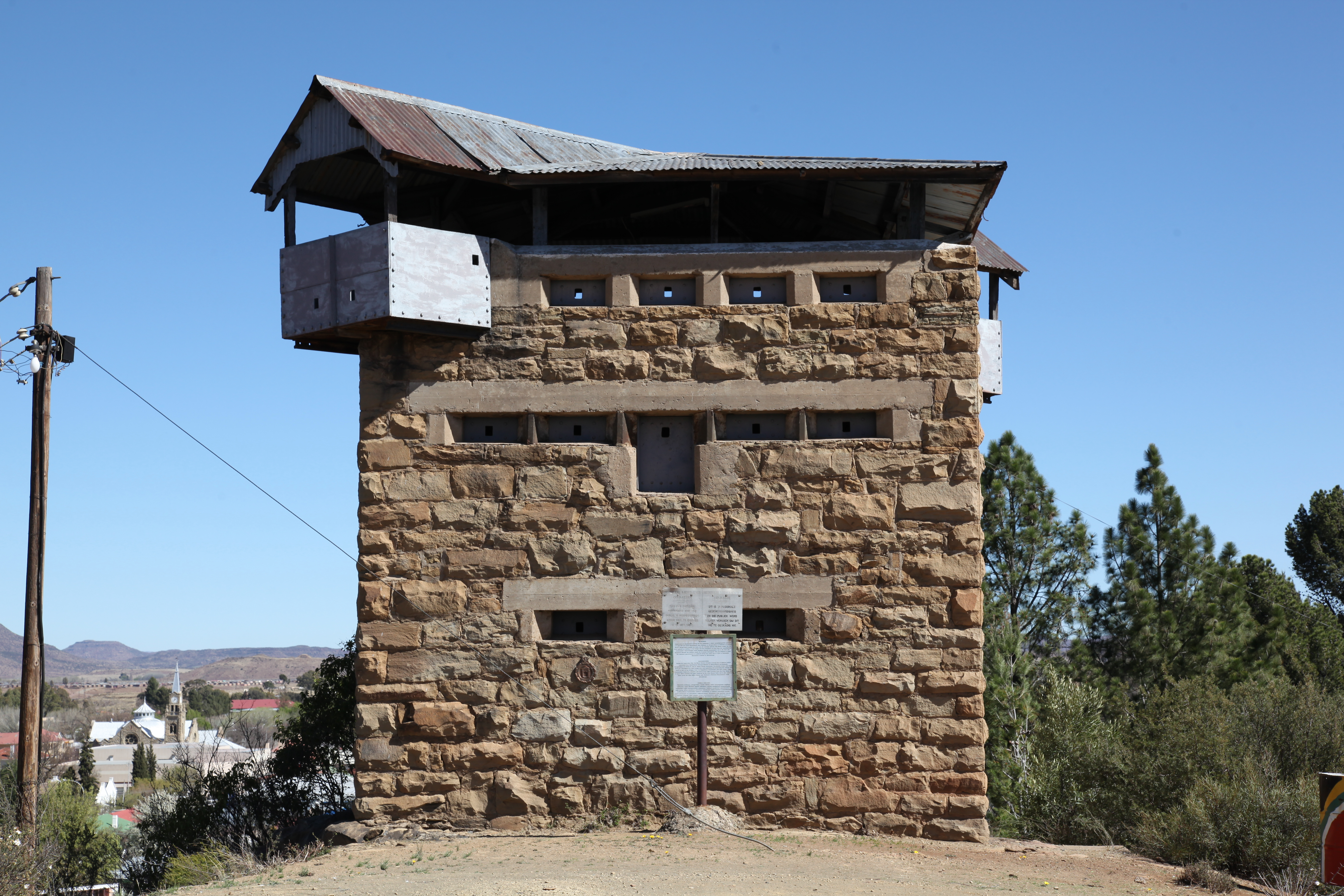
Sentinel Blockhouse in Burgersdorp

During the Second Boer War the British forces built a large number of fortifications in South Africa. Around 441 were solid masonry blockhouses, many of which stand today. Different designs were used in the construction of these blockhouses, but most were either two or three story structures built using locally quarried stone.

However the vast scale of British strategy led the British to develop cheaper, double-skinned corrugated iron structures. These could be prefabricated, delivered to site by armoured train, and then have locally sourced rocks or rubble packed inside the double skin to provide improved protection.

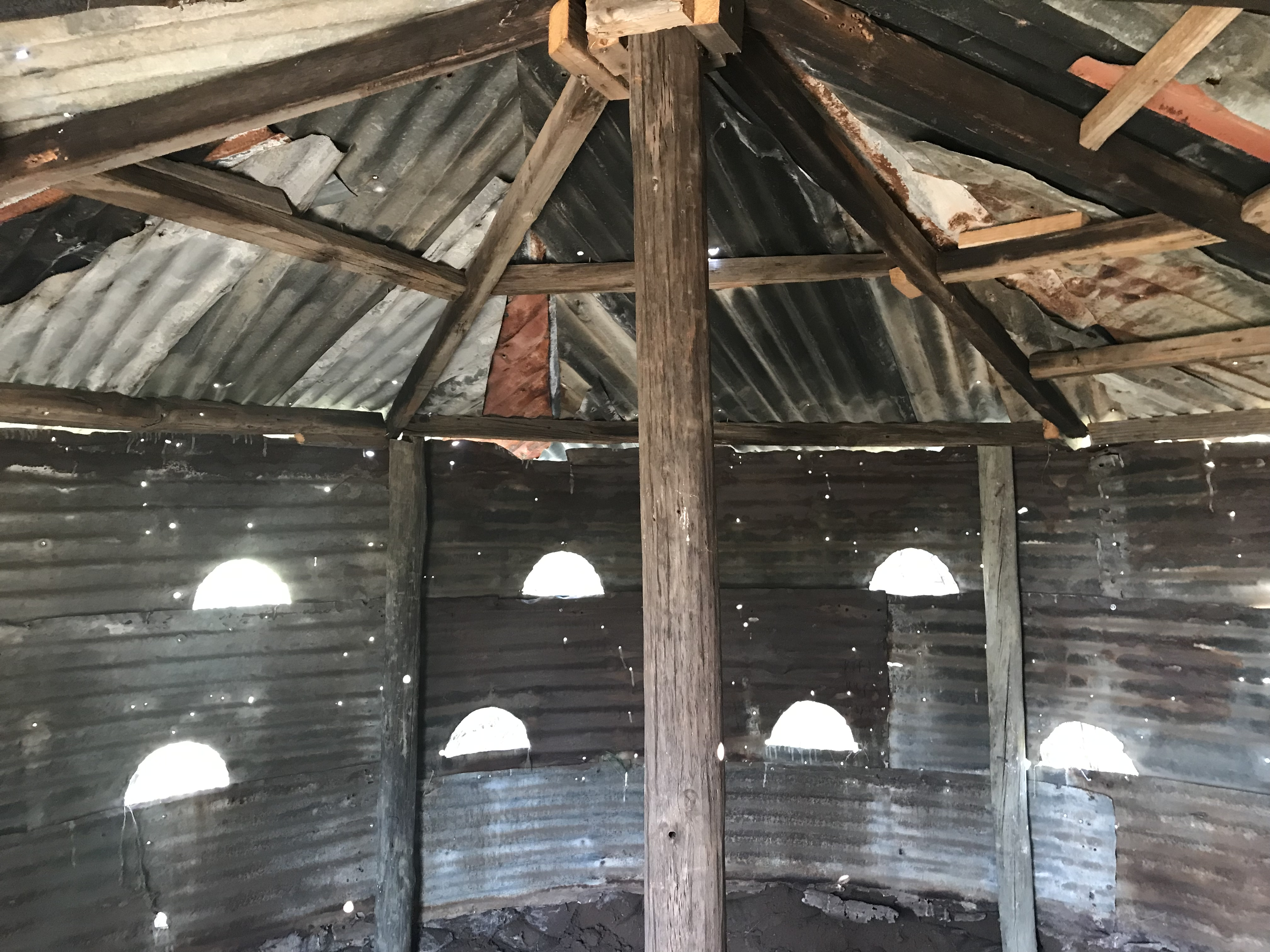
Rice Pattern Blockhouse located on Kalkheuwel

A circular design developed by Major Rice in February 1901 had good all round visibility, and the lack of corners did away with the need for a substructure. Failure due to wood rot and splintering when hit by bullets or shrapnel were eliminated. The steel door to the blockhouse was sheltered by another piece of corrugated iron. The Major Rice blockhouse could be erected in six hours by six trained men. With the change from square gabled roofs to a circular design, they were given the nickname "Pepperpot blockhouse". With mass production the cost to build a blockhouse dropped down to £16, compared to several hundred pounds for masonry ones.

These blockhouses played a vital role in the protection of the railway lines and bridges that were key to the British military supply lines.

== Concrete blockhouses ==
During World War I and World War II, many types of blockhouses were built, when time allowed usually constructed of reinforced concrete. The major difference between a modern blockhouse and a bunker is that a bunker is constructed mostly below ground level while a blockhouse is constructed mostly above ground level.

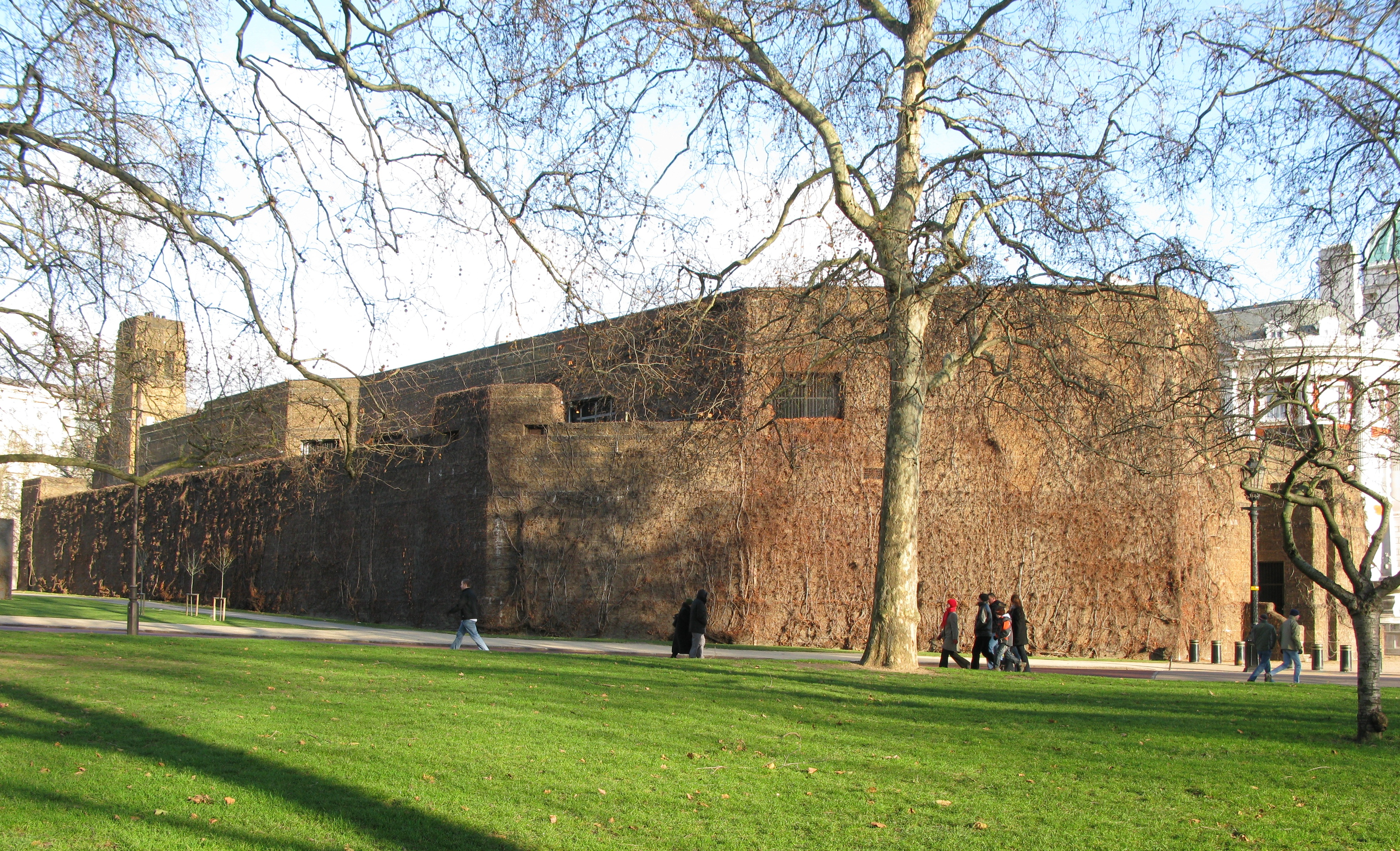
The Admiralty Citadel, St James' Park, London, in 2008

Some blockhouses like those constructed in England in 1940 were built in anticipation of a German invasion; they were often hexagonal in shape and were called "pillboxes". About 28,000 pillboxes and other hardened field fortifications were constructed, of which about 6,500 still survive.

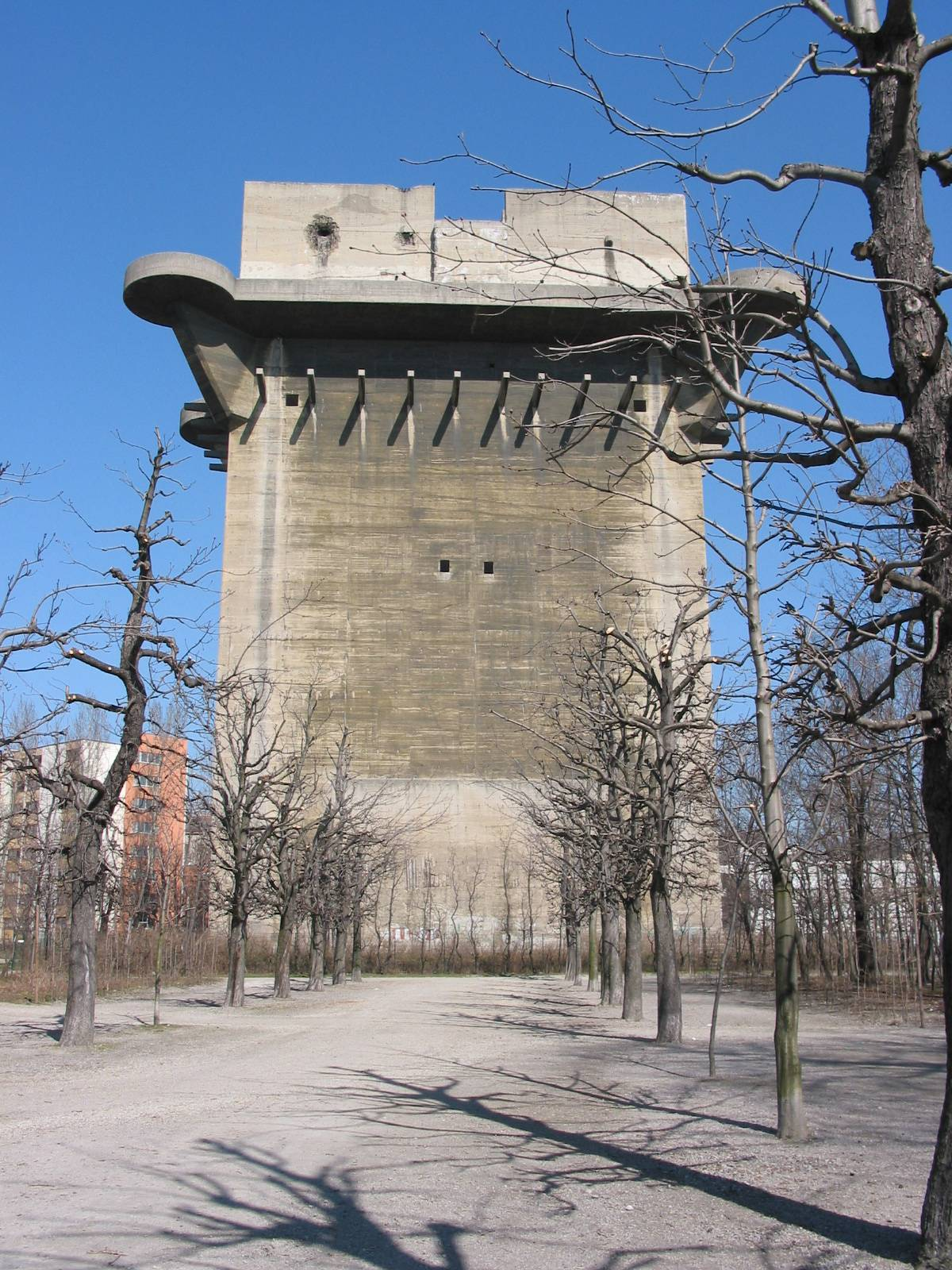
A German-built Flakturm (Flak tower) in the Augarten Vienna, Austria

The Admiralty Citadel in London is one of the sturdiest above-ground structures built during World War II. It was constructed in 1940–1941 as a bomb-proof operations centre for the Admiralty, with foundations nine metres deep and a concrete roof six metres thick. It too was intended to serve as a strongpoint in defending against the feared invasion.

In Berlin and other cities during World War II some massive blockhouses were built as air-raid shelters and anti-aircraft artillery platforms. They were called Hochbunker (literally, "high bunkers"; better translated as "above ground bunkers", to distinguish them from underground air raid shelters) and those that functioned as anti-aircraft artillery platforms were also called Flak towers. Some were over six stories high; several survive because of the high cost of demolition. The Hochbunker Pallasstraße in Berlin-Schöneberg has a post-war block of flats built over it. During the Cold War the shelter was in use as a NATO foodstore.

In the guerrilla phase of the Irish Civil War (1922–1923), a network of blockhouses was constructed to protect the railways from guerrilla attacks.

Blockhouses and coordinated road systems were used in the encirclement campaigns of Chiang Kai-shek against the Chinese Communist Party.

== See also ==
- Battery tower
- Blockhouse No. 1, New York City
- Block House (Delaware)
- British hardened field defences of World War II - Pillbox
- Caponier
- Casemate
- Chartaque
- Chardak
- Fort King George in Darien, Georgia
- Fort Pitt Block House in Point State Park in Pittsburgh
- Martello tower
- Ostrog (fortress)
- Sangar (fortification)
