= West Cameron Township, Pennsylvania =

Township in Pennsylvania, US

Coordinates: 40°45′30″N 76°36′59″W

- Township
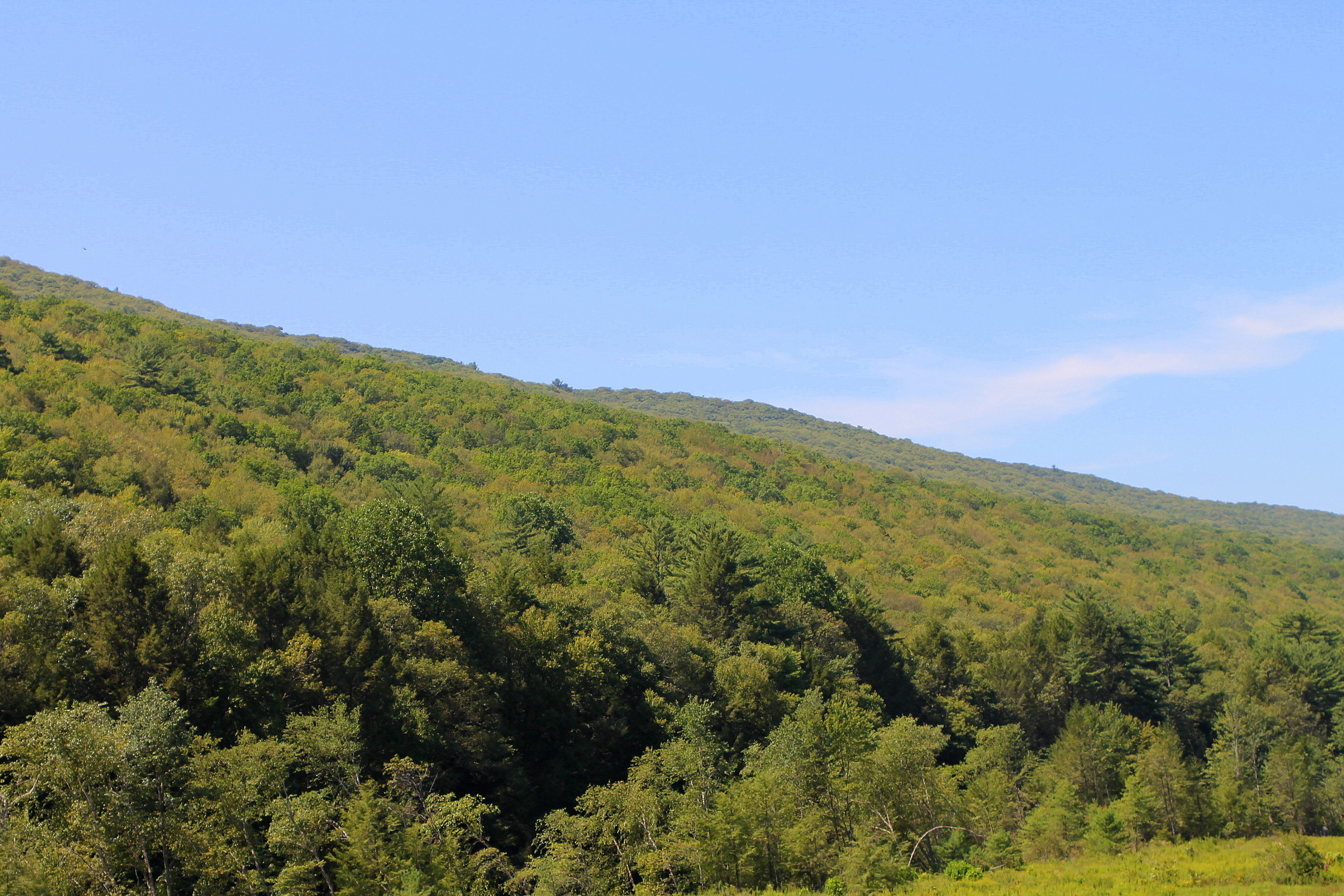
- View of West Cameron Township, Northumberland County, Pennsylvania looking south to a forested ridge

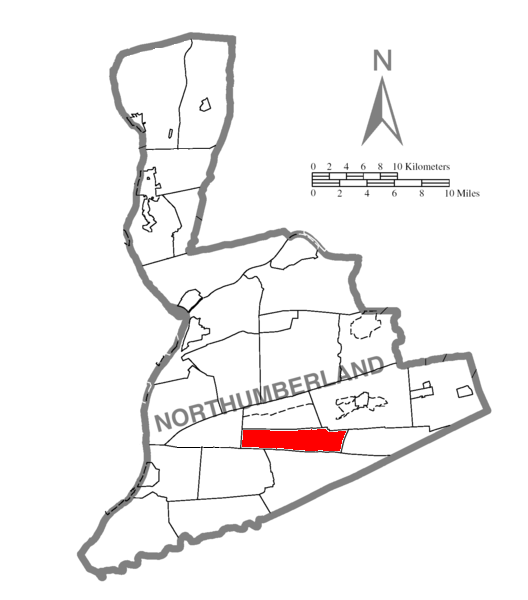
- Map of Northumberland County, Pennsylvania highlighting West Cameron Township

- Map of Northumberland County, Pennsylvania
- Country: United States
- State: Pennsylvania
- County: Northumberland

Government
  - Type: Board of Supervisors

Area
  - Total: 11.89 sq mi (30.79 km^{2})
  - Land: 11.73 sq mi (30.37 km^{2})
  - Water: 0.16 sq mi (0.42 km^{2})

Population (2010)
  - Total: 541
  - Estimate (2016): 536
  - Density: 45.7/sq mi (17.65/km^{2})
- Time zone: UTC-5 (Eastern (EST))
  - Summer (DST): UTC-4 (EDT)
- Area code: 570
- FIPS code: 42-097-82680

West Cameron Township is a township that is located in Northumberland County, Pennsylvania, United States.

The population at the time of the 2010 Census was 541, an increase over the figure of 517 that was tabulated in 2000.

== Geography ==
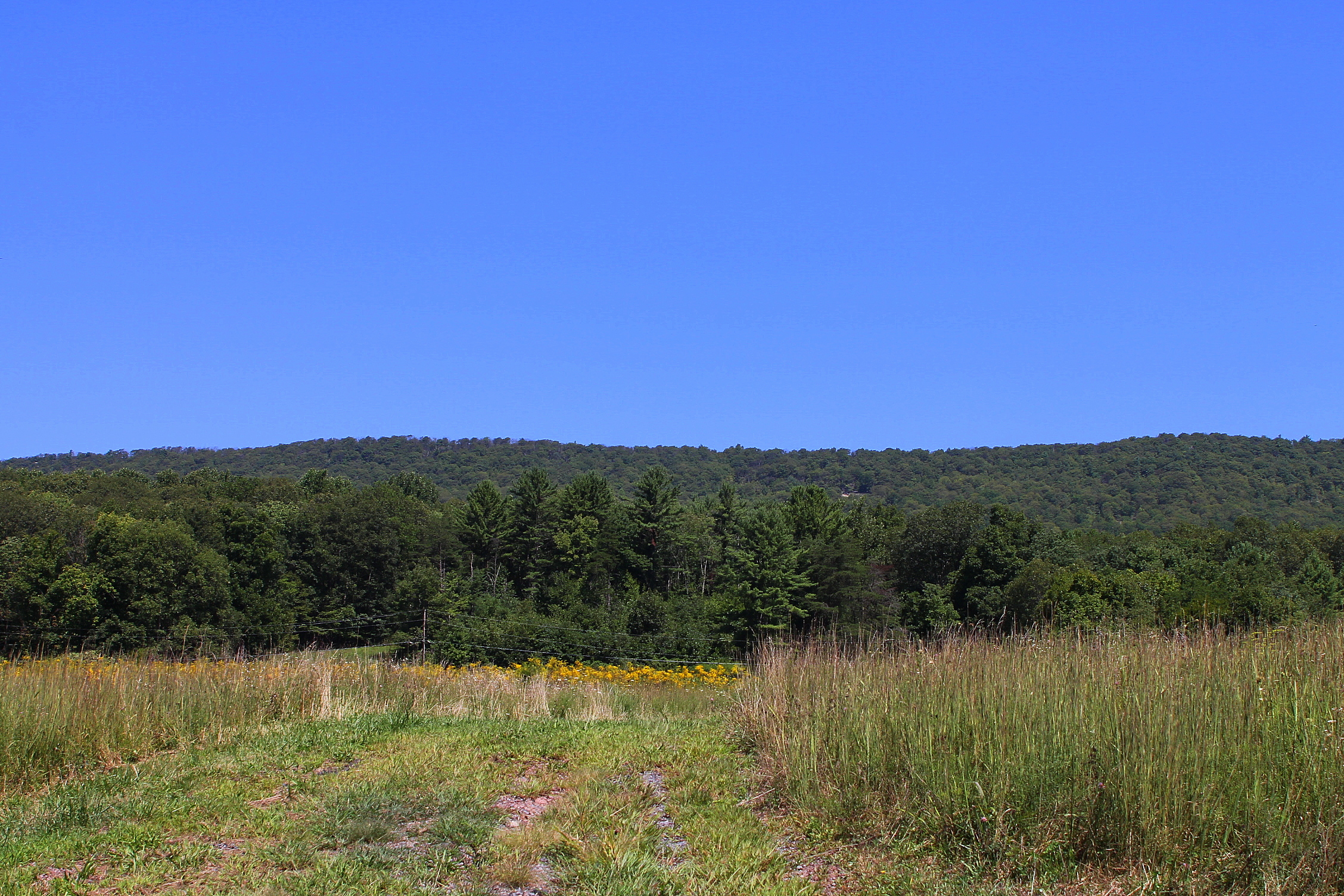
View of West Cameron Township, Northumberland County, Pennsylvania looking north

According to the United States Census Bureau, the township has a total area of 11.8 square miles (30.7 km^{2}), all land.

== Demographics ==
Historical population
Census	Pop.	Note	%±
2010	541		—
2016 (est.)	536		−0.9%
U.S. Decennial Census

As of the census of 2000, there were 517 people, 192 households, and 149 families residing in the township.

The population density was 43.7 inhabitants per square mile (16.9/km^{2}). There were 205 housing units at an average density of 17.3/sq mi (6.7/km^{2}).

The racial makeup of the township was 100.00% White. Hispanic or Latino of any race were 0.19% of the population.

There were 192 households, out of which 31.3% had children who were under the age of eighteen living with them; 66.7% were married couples living together, 5.2% had a female householder with no husband present, and 21.9% were non-families.

Out of all of the households that were documented, 19.3% were made up of individuals, and 9.4% had someone living alone who was sixty-five years of age or older.

The average household size was 2.69 and the average family size was 3.05.

Within the township, the population was spread out, with 23.4% of residents who were under the age of eighteen, 7.9% who were aged eighteen to twenty-four, 30.6% who were aged twenty-five to forty-four, 24.6% who were aged forty-five to sixty-four, and 13.5% who were sixty-five years of age or older.

The median age was thirty-nine years.

For every one hundred females, there were 110.2 males. For every one hundred females who were aged eighteen or older, there were 109.5 males.

The median income for a household in the township was $32,813, and the median income for a family was $35,625. Males had a median income of $31,250 compared with that of $19,000 for females.

The per capita income for the township was $14,563.

Approximately 5.7% of families and 4.7% of the population were living below the poverty line, including 7.5% of those who were under the age of eighteen and 8.4% of those who were aged sixty-five or older.
