= Cameron, Wisconsin =

Cameron, Wisconsin may refer to:

- Cameron, Barron County, Wisconsin, a village
- Cameron, Wood County, Wisconsin, a town
