= Cameron Blockhouse =

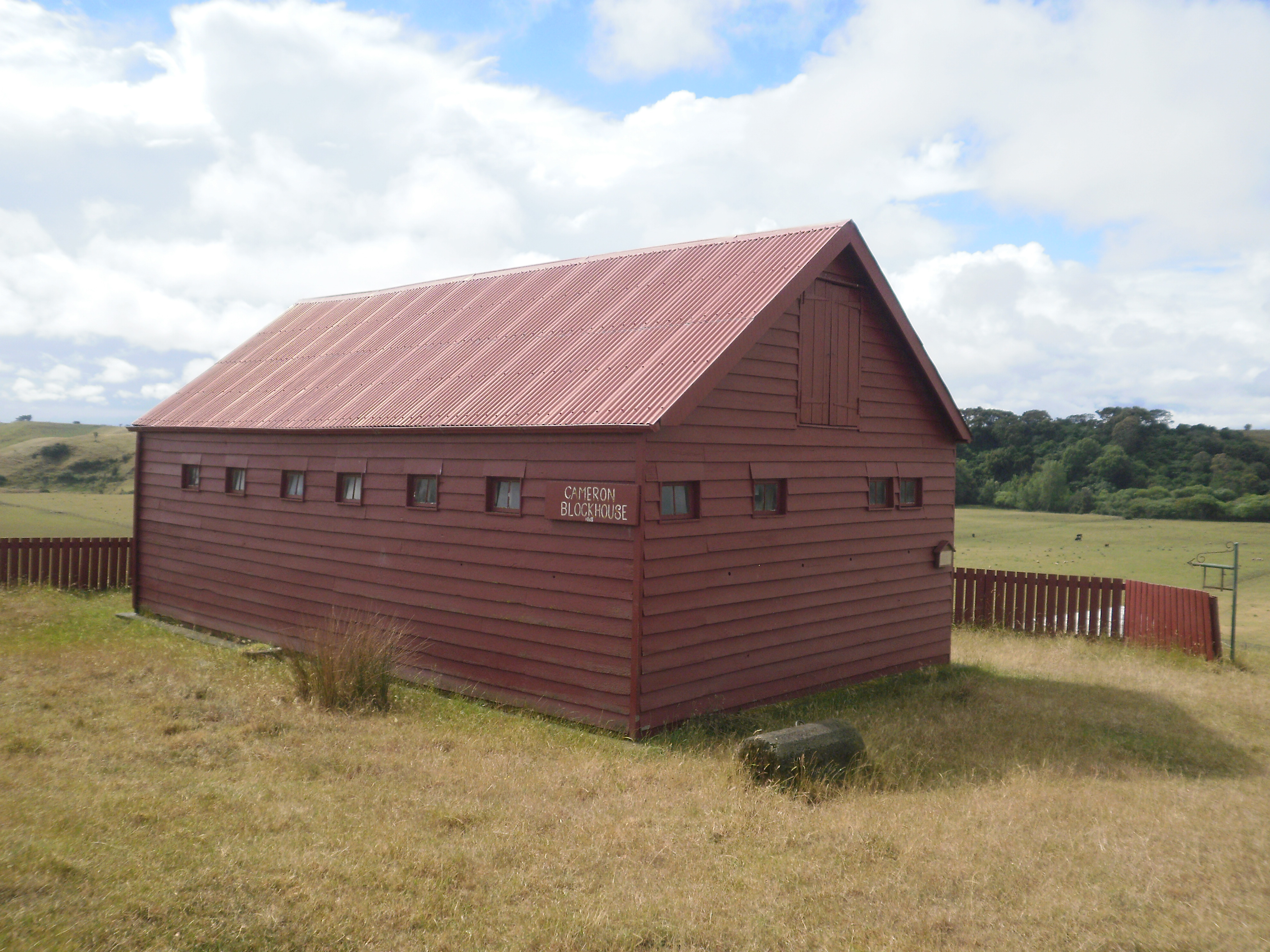
- A view of the Cameron Blockhouse

- Location within New Zealand
- 39°58′24″S 175°07′25″E
- Location: Wanganui, New Zealand

History
- Built: c. 1868

Heritage New Zealand – Category 1
- Designated: 10 October 1994
- Reference no.: 7179

The Cameron Blockhouse is a timber blockhouse in Wanganui, New Zealand, built during the New Zealand Wars in the mid-19th century. It is a rare surviving example of a privately constructed redoubt from that era.

John Cameron bought the property known as Marangai in 1841, but it wasn't until around 1868, when he commissioned a blockhouse to protect his family from what he believed was an impending attack by Māori leader Riwha Titokowaru. Titokowaru had won several battles in south Taranaki and was heading south to Wanganui. Heightening the fears of settlers was Te Kooti's raid of Poverty Bay that occurred around the same time.

The blockhouse consists of a floor of compacted earth, double-skinned tōtara walls with clay infill and a corrugated iron roof. Clay was used in the walls for protection against bullets and the threat of fire.

The blockhouse was listed as a Historic Place Category 1 on 10 October 1994.
