= Cameron Township, Hall County, Nebraska =

Coordinates: 40.917°N 98.665°W

Cameron Township is a township in Hall County, Nebraska, in the United States.

It was organized in 1881.
