= List of churches in Malta =

On the islands of Malta and Gozo, which are two separate dioceses in the country of Malta, there are a total of 359 churches (313 in Malta and 46 in Gozo). Of these, 78 are parishes (63 in Malta and 15 in Gozo) and six are national parishes. This means that there is a church density of slightly more than one church per square kilometer. In Malta, every locality has its parish church, apart from two or three small localities. There are also localities that have more than one parish church, like Sliema and Birkirkara, which have four parishes each. The list below lists most of the churches in Malta, Gozo and Comino, starting from the cathedrals, minor basilicas, parish churches and churches/chapels.

== List ==
Town or city	Status	Dedication	Region	Location	Denomination	Feast	See also	Image
Mdina	Metropolitan Cathedral; Parish	St Paul	Northern Region	St Paul Square (Pjazza San Pawl)	Roman Catholic	29 June	St Paul's Cathedral, Mdina	
Valletta	Co-Cathedral	St John the Baptist	South Eastern Region	St John Square (Pjazza San Ġwann)	Roman Catholic	24 June	St John's Co-Cathedral	
Valletta	Pro-Cathedral	St Paul	South Eastern Region	Independence Square (Pjazza Indipendenza)	Church of England		St Paul's Pro-Cathedral, Valletta	
Birkirkara	Collegiate; Basilica; Parish	St Helen	Central Region	Sanctuary Street (Triq is-Santwarju)	Roman Catholic	3 May, 18 August	St Helen's Basilica	
Għarb	Basilica	Our Lady of Ta' Pinu	Gozo Region	Ta' Pinu area	Roman Catholic	22 June	Basilica of the Blessed Virgin Of Ta' Pinu	
Għarb	Collegiate; Basilica; Parish	Visitation of Our Lady to St Elizabeth	Gozo Region	Trux Street (Triq Tat-Trux)	Roman Catholic	First Sunday of July	Basilica of the Visitation, Għarb	
Senglea	Collegiate; Basilica; Parish	Nativity of Mary	South Eastern Region	St. Laurence Street (Triq San Lawrenz)	Roman Catholic	8 September	Basilica of the Nativity of Mary, Senglea	
Mosta	Basilica; Parish	Assumption of Mary	Northern Region	Church Street (Triq il-Knisja)	Roman Catholic	15 August	Basilica of the Assumption of Our Lady	
Nadur	Collegiate; Basilica; Parish	St Peter and St Paul	Gozo Region	28 April 1688 Square (Pjazza t-28 ta' April, 1688)	Roman Catholic	29 June	Basilica of St Peter and St Paul, Nadur	
Paola	Basilica; Parish	Christ the King	South Eastern Region	Antoine De Paule Square (Pjazza Antoine De Paule)	Roman Catholic	Last Sunday of July	Basilica of Christ the King, Paola	
Rabat	Collegiate; Basilica; Parish	St Paul	Northern Region	Main Street (Triq il-Kbira)	Roman Catholic	1st Sunday of July	Basilica of St Paul, Rabat	
Valletta	Basilica; Parish	Our Lady of Fair Havens and Saint Dominic	South Eastern Region	Merchant Street (Triq il-Merkanti)	Roman Catholic	first Sunday of August	Basilica of St Dominic, Valletta	
Valletta	Basilica	Our Lady of Mount Carmel	South Eastern Region	Old Theatre Street (Triq it-Teatru il-Qadim)	Roman Catholic	16 July	Basilica of Our Lady of Mount Carmel, Valletta	
Victoria	Collegiate; Basilica; Parish	St George	Gozo Region	St George's Square (Pjazza San Ġorġ)	Roman Catholic	3rd Sunday of July	St George's Basilica	
Xagħra	Collegiate; Basilica; Parish	Nativity of Mary	Gozo Region	Victory Square (Pjazza Vitorja)	Roman Catholic	8 September	Basilica of the Nativity of Our Lady, Xagħra	
Attard	Parish	Assumption of Mary	Central Region	Main Street (Triq il-Kbira)	Roman Catholic	15 August	Parish Church of St Mary, Attard	
Balzan	Parish	Annunciation	Central Region	Main Street (Triq il-Kbira)	Roman Catholic	2nd Sunday of July	Annunciation Church, Balzan	
Birgu	Collegiate; Parish	St Lawrence	South Eastern Region	Charity Street (Triq il-Karità)	Roman Catholic	10 August	St. Lawrence's Church, Vittoriosa	
Birkirkara	Parish	Our Lady of Mount Carmel	Central Region	Fleur-de-Lys area	Roman Catholic	1st Sunday of July	Parish Church of Our Lady of Mount Carmel, Fleur-de-Lys	
Birkirkara	Parish	St Joseph the Worker	Central Region	Bwieraq Street (Triq il-Bwieraq)	Roman Catholic	1 May		
Birkirkara	Parish	Assumption of Mary	Central Region	E.B. Vella Street (Triq E.B. Vella)	Roman Catholic	15 August	Parish Church of St Mary, Birkirkara	
Birkirkara	Parish	St George Preca	Central Region	Swatar	Roman Catholic	9 May		
Birżebbuġa	Parish	St Peter in Chains	Malta Eastern Region	Church Square (Misraħ il-Knisja)	Roman Catholic	1st Sunday of August		
Blata l-Bajda	Church	Cornerstone Pentecostal Church	Assemblies of God	Block 55 National Road	Pentecostal			
Bormla	Collegiate; Parish	Immaculate Conception	South Eastern Region	Bull Street (Triq il-Gendus)	Roman Catholic	8 December	Collegiate Church of the Immaculate Conception, Bormla	
Dingli	Parish	Assumption of Mary	Northern Region	Parish Street (Triq il-Parroċċa)	Roman Catholic	Sunday after 15 August	Parish Church of the Assumption, Dingli	
Fgura	Parish	Our Lady of Mount Carmel	South Eastern Region	Hompesch Road (Triq Hompesch)	Roman Catholic	2nd Sunday of July	Our Lady of Mount Carmel Parish Church, Fgura	
Floriana	Parish	St Publius	South Eastern Region	St Publius Square (Pjazza San Publju)	Roman Catholic	2nd Sunday after Easter	St. Publius Parish Church	
Fontana	Parish	Sacred Heart of Jesus	Gozo Region	Spring Street (Triq tal-Għajn)	Roman Catholic	3rd Sunday of June	Sacred Heart Catholic Church in Fontana	
Gudja	Parish	Assumption of Mary	Southern Region	Chaplin Street (Triq il-Kappillan)	Roman Catholic	15 August	St Mary's Church, Gudja	
Għajnsielem	Parish	Our Lady of Loreto	Gozo Region	J.F. De Chambray Street (Triq J.F. De Chambray)	Roman Catholic	Last Sunday of August	Our Lady of Loreto Parish Church	
Għargħur	Parish	St Bartholomew	Northern Region	Ferdinand Street (Triq Ferdinand)	Roman Catholic	Last Sunday of August	Church of St Bartholomew, Għargħur	
Għasri	Parish	Corpus Christi	Gozo Region	Our Saviour's Square (Pjazza Salvatur)	Roman Catholic	1st/2nd Sunday of June	Corpus Christi Church, Għasri	
Għaxaq	Parish	Assumption of Mary	Southern Region	Labour Avenue (Vjal il-Labour)	Roman Catholic	15 August	St Mary's Church, Għaxaq	
Gżira	Parish	Our Lady of Mount Carmel	Central Region	Manoel De Vilhena Street (Triq Manwel De Vilhena)	Roman Catholic	2nd Sunday of July	Carmelite Parish Church, Gżira	
Ħamrun	Parish	Immaculate Conception	Southern Region	Manoel Magri Street (Triq Manwel Magri)	Roman Catholic	1st Sunday of July	Parish Church of the Immaculate Conception, Ħamrun	
Ħamrun	Parish	Saint Cajetan	Southern Region	St. Joseph High Road (Triq il-Kbira San Ġużepp)	Roman Catholic	1st Sunday after 6 August	Parish Church of St Cajetan, Ħamrun	
Iklin	Parish	Holy Family	Central Region	Ninu Cremona Square (Pjazza Ninu Cremona)	Roman Catholic			
Kalkara	Parish	St Joseph	South Eastern Region	Archbishop Gonzi Square (Misraħ l-Arċisqof Gonzi)	Roman Catholic	3rd Sunday of July		
Kerċem	Parish	St Gregory and Our Lady of Soccorso	Gozo Region	St. Gregory Street (Triq San Girgor)	Roman Catholic	2nd Sunday of July		
Kirkop	Parish	St Leonard the Abbot	Southern Region	Parish Street (Triq il-Parroċċa)	Roman Catholic	4th Sunday of August	St Leonard's Church, Kirkop	
Lija	Parish	Transfiguration of Jesus	Central Region	Transfiguration Square (Misraħ tat-Trasfigurazzjoni)	Roman Catholic	6 August	Our Saviour's Church, Lija	
Luqa	Parish	St Andrew	Southern Region	Church Square (Misraħ tal-Knisja)	Roman Catholic	1st Sunday of July	St Andrew's Parish Church, Luqa	
Marsa	Parish	Holy Trinity	South Eastern Region	Balbi Street (Triq Balbi)	Roman Catholic	Trinity Sunday	Trinity Church, Marsa	
Marsa	Parish	Mary Queen of Heaven	South Eastern Region	N Sacco Street (Triq N Sacco)	Roman Catholic	Last Sunday of August		
Marsaskala	Parish	Saint Anne	South Eastern Region	St. George Street (Triq San Ġorġ)	Roman Catholic	Last Sunday of July		
Marsaxlokk	Parish	Our Lady of Pompeii	South Eastern Region	Fishermen's Strand (Xatt is-Sajjieda)	Roman Catholic	4th Sunday of July	Parish Church of Our Lady Of Pompei, Marsaxlokk	
Mellieħa	Parish	Nativity of Mary	Northern Region	Parish Square (Misraħ il-Parroċċa)	Roman Catholic	8 September	Parish Church of the Nativity of the Virgin Mary, Mellieħa	
Mellieħa	Parish	St Joseph	Northern Region	Manikata Mellieha Street (Triq il-Mellieha)	Roman Catholic		Parish Church of St Joseph, Manikata	
Mġarr	Parish	Assumption of Mary	Northern Region	Dun Edgar Street (Triq Dun Edgar)	Roman Catholic	Sunday after 15 August	Parish Church of the Assumption, Mġarr	
Mqabba	Parish	Assumption of Mary	Southern Region	Church Square (Misraħ il-Knisja)	Roman Catholic	15 August	St Mary's Church, Mqabba	
Msida	Parish	St Joseph	Central Region	Church Street (Triq il-Knisja)	Roman Catholic	3rd Sunday of July	St Joseph's Church, Msida	
Mtarfa	Parish	Saint Lucy	Northern Region	Maltese Regiments Street (Triq ir-Reġimenti Maltin)	Roman Catholic	13 December		
Munxar	Parish	St Paul	Gozo Region	12 December Street (Triq it-Tnax ta' Diċembru)	Roman Catholic	Last Sunday of May	St Paul's Church, Munxar	
Naxxar	Parish	Nativity of Mary	Northern Region	Victory Square (Misraħ il-Vittorja)	Roman Catholic	8 September	Church of the Nativity of Mary, Naxxar	
Paola, Malta	Parish	Our Lady of Lourdes	South Eastern Region	Brittany Street (Triq Brittanja)	Roman Catholic	3rd Sunday of August		
Pembroke	Parish	Resurrection of Jesus	Northern Region	George Mitrovich Street (Triq Ġorġ Mitrovich)	Roman Catholic			
Pietà	Parish	Our Lady of Fatima	Central Region	St. Monica Street (Triq Santa Monika)	Roman Catholic			
Qala	Parish	St Joseph	Gozo Region	St. Joseph Square (Pjazza San Ġużepp)	Roman Catholic	First Sunday of August		
Qormi	Collegiate; Parish	St George	Southern Region	Oratory Street (Triq l-Oratorju)	Roman Catholic	4th Sunday of June	Parish Church of St George, Qormi	
Qormi	Parish	St Sebastian	Southern Region	St Bartholomew Street (Triq San Bartolomew)	Roman Catholic	3rd Sunday of July	Church of St Sebastian, Qormi	
Qrendi	Parish	Assumption of Mary	Southern Region	Parish Street (Triq il-Parroċċa)	Roman Catholic	15 August	Parish Church of the Assumption, Qrendi	
Safi	Parish	St Paul	Southern Region	St. Mary Street (Triq Santa Marija)	Roman Catholic	Last Sunday of August	St Paul's Church, Safi	
San Ġiljan	Parish	St Julian	Central Region	Spinola area	Roman Catholic	Last Sunday of August		
San Ġiljan	Parish	Our Lady of Mount Carmel	Central Region	Balluta area	Roman Catholic	Last Sunday of July	Carmelite Church, Balluta	
San Ġwann	Parish	Our Lady of Lourdes	Central Region	Lourdes Square (Misraħ Lourdes)	Roman Catholic	First Sunday of August		
San Lawrenz	Parish	St Lawrence	Gozo Region	St. Lawrence Square (Pjazza San Lawrenz)	Roman Catholic	Sunday after 10 August		
San Pawl il-Baħar	Parish	St Francis of Assisi	Northern Region	Qawra	Roman Catholic	Last Sunday of July		
San Pawl il-Baħar	Parish	Sacred Heart of Mary	Northern Region	Burmarrad	Roman Catholic	Last Sunday of June		
Sannat	Parish	St Margaret	Gozo Region	Ta' Cenc Road (Triq Ta' Ċenċ)	Roman Catholic	4th Sunday of July	Church of St Margaret, Sannat	
Santa Luċija	Parish	St Pius X	Southern Region	Inez Soler Street (Triq Ineż Soler)	Roman Catholic			
Santa Venera	Parish	St Venera	Central Region	St. Joseph High Road (Triq il-Kbira San Ġużepp)	Roman Catholic	Last Sunday of July	Santa Venera Parish Church	
Siġġiewi	Parish	St Nicholas	Southern Region	Parish Street (Triq il-Parroċċa)	Roman Catholic	Last Sunday of June	Church of St Nicholas, Siġġiewi	
Sliema	Parish	Jesus of Nazareth	Central Region	Tignè area	Roman Catholic			
Sliema	Parish	Sacro Cour	Central Region	Church Street (Triq il-Knisja)	Roman Catholic	First Sunday of July	Our Lady of the Sacred Heart Parish Church	
Sliema	Parish	St Gregory the Great	Central Region	Norfolk Street (Triq Norfolk)	Roman Catholic	First Sunday of September		
Sliema	Parish	Stella Maris	Central Region	High Street (Triq il-Kbira)	Roman Catholic	1st Sunday after 18 August	Stella Maris Church, Sliema	
Swieqi	Parish	Immaculate Conception	Northern Region	Tal-Ibraġ	Roman Catholic			
Ta' Xbiex	Parish	St John of the Cross	Central Region	Sir Temi Zammit Avenue (Vjal Sir Temi Zammit)	Roman Catholic	Last Sunday of November		
Tarxien	Parish	Annunciation	South Eastern Region	Main Street (Triq il-Kbira)	Roman Catholic		Annunciation Church, Tarxien	
Valletta	Parish	St Augustine	South Eastern Region	Old Bakeries Street (Triq l-Ifran)	Roman Catholic		Parish Church of St Augustine	
Valletta	Collegiate; Parish	St Paul Shipwrecked	South Eastern Region	St. Paul Street (Triq San Pawl)	Roman Catholic	10 February	Collegiate Parish Church of St Paul's Shipwreck	
Victoria	Parish	Assumption of Mary	Gozo Region	Cittadella area	Roman Catholic	15 August	Cathedral of the Assumption, Victoria	
Xewkija	Parish	St John the Baptist	Gozo Region	St. John the Baptist Square (Pjazza San Ġwann Battista)	Roman Catholic	Sunday after 24 June	Rotunda of Xewkija	
Żabbar	Parish	Our Lady of Grace	South Eastern Region	Sanctuary Street (Triq is-Santwarju)	Roman Catholic	Sunday after 8 September	Parish Church of Our Lady of Graces, Żabbar	
Żebbuġ, Gozo	Parish	Assumption of Mary	Gozo Region	Church Street (Triq il-Knisja)	Roman Catholic	Sunday after 15 August	Parish Church of the Assumption of Mary, Żebbuġ	
Żebbuġ, Malta	Parish	St Philip of Agira	Southern Region	Parish Street (Triq il-Parroċċa)	Roman Catholic	2nd Sunday of June	Church of St Philip of Agira, Ħaż-Żebbuġ	
Żejtun	Parish	St Catherine of Alexandria	South Eastern Region	Republic Square (Misraħ ir-Repubblika)	Roman Catholic	3rd Sunday of June	Church of St Catherine, Żejtun	
Żurrieq	Parish	St Catherine of Alexandria	Southern Region	Republic Square (Pjazza Repubblika)	Roman Catholic	1st Sunday of September	Church of St Catherine, Żurrieq	
Attard	Chapel	St Catherine of Alexandria	Central Region	Pitkali Street (Triq il-Pitkali)	Roman Catholic			
Attard	Chapel	St Anthony of Padua; The Russian Chapel	Central Region	In San Anton Palace	Roman Catholic; Previously Church of England then Russian Orthodox			
Attard	Chapel	Our Lady of the Pillar	Central Region	In San Anton Palace	Roman Catholic			
Attard	Chapel	St Paul	Central Region	St Paul's Street (Triq San Pawl)	Roman Catholic			
Attard	Chapel	Saint Anne	Central Region	St Anne's Square (Pjazza Sant' Anna)	Roman Catholic			
Attard	Chapel	Our Lady of Mount Carmel	Central Region	In Mount Carmel Hospital	Roman Catholic			
Attard	Chapel	Our Lady of Loreto	Central Region	The Malta Aviation Museum, Ta' Qali	Roman Catholic			
Attard	Chapel	Our Lady of Victory	Central Region	Imdina Road (Triq l-Imdina)	Roman Catholic			
Balzan	Chapel	Annunciation	Central Region	Three Churches Street (Triq it-Tlett Knejjes)	Roman Catholic	25 March		
Balzan	Chapel	Assumption of Mary	Central Region	Main Street (Triq il-Kbira)	Roman Catholic	15 August		
Balzan	Chapel	Franciscan Missionaries of Mary	Central Region	St Francis Street (Triq San Frangisk)	Roman Catholic			
Balzan	Chapel	Good Shepherd	Central Region	Idmedja Street (Triq Idmedja)	Roman Catholic			
Balzan	Chapel	Holy Cross; Cemetery	Central Region	Balzan Valley Street (Triq il-Wied ta' Balzan)	Roman Catholic			
Balzan	Chapel	Saint Roch	Central Region	Three Churches Street (Triq it-Tlett Knejjes)	Roman Catholic			
Balzan	Chapel	Sisters of Charity	Central Region	Birbal Street (Triq Birbal)	Roman Catholic			
Birgu	Church	Saint Anne	South Eastern Region	St Scholastica Street (Triq Santa Skolastika)	Roman Catholic			
Birgu	Chapel	Saint Anne	South Eastern Region	Fort St. Angelo	Roman Catholic		Chapel of St Anne, Fort St Angelo	
Birgu	Church	Annunciation	South Eastern Region	Main Arch Street (Triq il-Mina l-Kbira)	Roman Catholic	August		
Birgu	Church	Holy Cross	South Eastern Region	Victory Square (Misrah ir-Rebha)	Roman Catholic			
Birgu	Chapel	Holy Trinity	South Eastern Region	Old Prison Street (Triq il-Ħabs l-Antik)	Roman Catholic			
Birgu	Chapel	Nativity of Mary	South Eastern Region	Fort St. Angelo	Roman Catholic		Church of Mary's Nativity within the Fort	
Birgu	Church	Our Lady of Damascus; Tal-Griegi	South Eastern Region	Oratory of St Joseph	Roman Catholic		Chapel of Our Lady of Damascus, Birgu	
Birgu	Church	Our Lady of Mount Carmel	South Eastern Region	St Lawrence Street (Triq San Lawrenz)	Roman Catholic			
Birgu	Chapel	St Philip Neri	South Eastern Region	St Philip Street (Triq San Filippu)	Roman Catholic			
Birgu	Chapel	Sacred Heart; Tal-Ħawli	South Eastern Region	Sacred Heart Street (Triq il-Qalb ta' Gesu')	Roman Catholic			
Birkirkara	Church	Christus Sacerdos	Central Region	Anglu Grima Street (Triq Anglu Grima)	Roman Catholic			
Birkirkara	Chapel	Nativity of Mary (Our Lady of Victory)	Central Region	Victory Street (Triq il-Vitorja), Ħas-Sajjied	Roman Catholic	8 September		
Birkirkara	Church	St Paul	Central Region	Valley Road (Triq il-Wied)	Roman Catholic			
Birkirkara	Church	Sacred Heart	Central Region	St. Aloysius Square (Misraħ San Alwiġi)	Roman Catholic			
Birkirkara	Chapel	St Anthony of Padua & St Catherine of Alexandria	Central Region	Triq il-Kbira	Roman Catholic			
Birkirkara	Church	St Alphonsus Maria de' Liguori	Central Region	Valley Road (Triq il-Wied)	Roman Catholic		Church of St Alphonse Liguori, Birkirkara	
Birkirkara	Church	Mary Help of Christians	Central Region	St Julian Street (Triq San Ġiljan}	Roman Catholic			
Birkirkara	Church	St Francis of Assisi	Central Region	Msida Road (Triq l-Imsida)	Roman Catholic			
Birkirkara	Chapel	Saint Monica	Central Region	1 May Street (Triq l-Ewwel ta' Mejju)	Roman Catholic			
Birkirkara	Church	Saint Roch	Central Region	St Roch Street (Triq Santu Rokku)	Roman Catholic			
Birkirkara	Church	Blessed Nazju Falzon	Central Region	Dun Gejtanu Mannarino Street (Triq Dun Gejtanu Mannarino)	Roman Catholic		Blessed Nazju Falzon Chapel	
Birkirkara	Church	St Thérèse of Lisieux	Central Region	Valley Road (Triq il-Wied)	Roman Catholic	1 October		
Birkirkara	Church	Our Lady of Tal-Ħerba	Central Region	Ħerba Street (Triq Tal-Ħerba)	Roman Catholic		Sanctuary of Our Lady of Tal-Ħerba	
Birkirkara	Church		Central Region	Mannarino Street (Triq Mannarino )	Seventh-day Adventist Church			
Birżebbuġa	Church	Our Lady of Sorrows	Southern Region	Church Street (Triq il-Knisja)	Serbian Orthodox Church Formerly Roman Catholic			
Birżebbuġa	Chapel	Saint George	Southern Region	Alfons Maria Galea Street (Triq Alfons Maria Galea)	Roman Catholic	23 April	St George's Chapel, Birżebbuġa	
Birżebbuġa	Chapel	Good Shepherd	Southern Region	St John Street (Triq San Ġwann)	Roman Catholic			
Birżebbuġa	Chapel	Holy Family	Southern Region	Żurrieq Road (Triq iż-Żurrieq)	Roman Catholic			
Birżebbuġa	Chapel	Our Lady Help of Christians	Southern Region	S Cachia Zammit Street (Triq S Cachia Zammit)	Roman Catholic			
Birżebbuġa	Chapel	Saint Joseph	Southern Region	S Cachia Zammit Street (Triq S Cachia Zammit)	Roman Catholic			
Birżebbuġa	Chapel	Immaculate Conception	Southern Region	Kuncizzjoni Street (Triq il-Kuncizzjoni); Bengħajsa	Roman Catholic		Chapel of the Immaculate Conception, Bengħisa	
Bormla	Church	The Missionaries of Charity	South Eastern Region	St Paul Street (Triq San Pawl)	Roman Catholic			
Bormla	Church	St Margaret	South Eastern Region	Cospicua Square (Pjazza Bormla)	Roman Catholic			
Bormla	Church	St Paul	South Eastern Region	St Paul Street (Triq San Pawl)	Roman Catholic		St Paul's Church, Cospicua	
Bormla	Church	St Teresa of Ávila	South Eastern Region	St. Theresa Street (Triq Santa Tereża)	Roman Catholic			
Bormla	Chapel	St Thomas	South Eastern Region	St Nicholas Street (Triq San Nikola)	Roman Catholic			
Bormla	Church	St John the Merciful	South Eastern Region	San Gwann t'Ghuxa Street (Triq San Gwann t'Ghuxa)	Roman Catholic			
Bormla	Church	Saint Joseph	South Eastern Region	St George Street (Triq San Ġorġ)	Roman Catholic			
Bormla	Church	Our Lady of Fátima	South Eastern Region	Wigi Rosato Street (Triq Wigi Rosato)	Roman Catholic			
Bormla	Church	Holy Cross	South Eastern Region	Oratory Street (Triq l-Oratorju)	Roman Catholic			
Dingli	Chapel	St Mary Magdalene	Northern Region	Panoramika Street (Triq Panoramika)	Roman Catholic	22 August	St Mary Magdalene Chapel, Dingli	
Dingli	Chapel	Saint Dominica	Northern Region	Ghajn Street (Triq il-Ghajn)	Roman Catholic		Chapel of St Domenica, Dingli	
Fgura	Church	Our Lady of Mount Carmel; Old Parish Church	South Eastern Region	Karmelitani Street (Triq il-Karmelitani)	Roman Catholic			
Fgura	Church	Pastoral Centre	South Eastern Region	Liedna Street (Triq Liedna)	Roman Catholic			
Floriana	Church	Holy Cross	South Eastern Region	F. S. Fenech Street (Triq F. S. Fenech)	Roman Catholic			
Floriana	Church	Our Lady of Lourdes	South Eastern Region	F. S. Fenech Street (Triq F. S. Fenech)	Roman Catholic			
Floriana	Church	Our Lady of Manresa	South Eastern Region	In Archbishop's Curia	Roman Catholic			
Floriana	Church	Immaculate Conception (Sarria)	South Eastern Region	Sarria Street (Triq Sarria)	Roman Catholic	8 December	Sarria Church	
Floriana	Church - Deconsecrated	Wesleyan Methodist Church	South Eastern Region	Sarria Street (Triq Sarria)	None; Formerly Methodist Church of Great Britain		Robert Sammut Hall	
Floriana	Church	Flight into Egypt	South Eastern Region	Valletta Waterfront	Roman Catholic		Church of the Flight into Egypt, Floriana	
Għajnsielem	Church	St Anthony of Padua	Gozo Region	St. Anthony Street (Triq Sant' Antnin)	Roman Catholic	June		
Għajnsielem	Chapel - Deconsecrated	Saint Cecilia	Gozo Region	Lambert Street (Triq ta' Lambert)	None; Formerly Roman Catholic	22 November	Santa Cecilia Chapel	
Għajnsielem	Church	Our Lady of Lourdes	Gozo Region	Triq Ix-Xatt	Roman Catholic	11 February		
Għajnsielem	Church	Our Lady of Loreto (Old Parish Church)	Gozo Region	Triq Il-Ġnien	Roman Catholic			
Għarb	Church	Visitation of Our Lady (Old Parish Church)	Gozo Region	St Peter Street (Triq San Pietru)	Roman Catholic			
Għarb	Chapel	St Demetrius	Gozo Region	Ta' Birbuba	Roman Catholic	3rd Sunday of October	St Dimitri Chapel, Għarb	
Għargħur	Chapel	Assumption of Mary	Northern Region	Magħtab	Roman Catholic			
Għargħur	Chapel	Assumption of Mary (Ta’ Bernarda)	Northern Region	Triq il-Kbira	Roman Catholic			
Għargħur	Church	Assumption of Mary (Taż-Żellieqa)	Northern Region	Madliena Street (Triq il-Madliena)	Roman Catholic	15 August		
Għargħur	Chapel	St John the Baptist	Northern Region	St John Street (Triq San Ġwann)	Roman Catholic			
Għargħur	Chapel	St John the Evangelist	Northern Region	Triq il-Wirt Naturali Baħar iċ-Ċagħaq	Roman Catholic			
Għargħur	Chapel	Saint Nicholas	Northern Region	St Nicholas Street (Triq San Nikola)	Roman Catholic	6 December	St Nicholas' Chapel, Għargħur	
Għargħur	Chapel	Saint Peter	Northern Region	Coast road (Triq il-Kosta) Baħar iċ-Ċagħaq	Roman Catholic			
Għargħur	Church	Our Lady of Angels	Northern Region	Xambekk Road (Triq ix-Xambekk) Baħar iċ-Ċagħaq	Roman Catholic			
Għasri	Basilica; Chapel	Patronage of Our Lady	Gozo Region	Church Street (Triq il-Knisja)	Roman Catholic	October		
Għasri	Chapel	Saint Publius	Gozo Region	St Publius Street (Triq San Publiju)	Roman Catholic	3rd or 4th Sunday of January	St Publius' Chapel, Għasri	
Għaxaq	Church	Christ the Redeemer	Southern Region	Triq il-Belt Valletta	Roman Catholic			
Għaxaq	Chapel	Saint Lucy	Southern Region	Tal-Barrani	Roman Catholic		St Lucy's Chapel, Għaxaq	
Għaxaq	Church	St Philip Neri	Southern Region	St Philip Street (Triq San Filippu)	Roman Catholic			
Gudja	Church	Assumption of Mary	Southern Region	St Mary Street (Triq Santa Marija)	Roman Catholic	15 August	St Mary's Chapel, Bir Miftuħ	
Gudja	Church	Annunciation	Southern Region	St Mary Street (Triq Santa Marija)	Roman Catholic			
Gudja	Church	Our Lady of Loreto	Southern Region	Ħal Far Road (Triq Ħal Far)	Roman Catholic			
Gudja	Chapel	St Catherine of Alexandria	Southern Region	Raymond Caruana Street (Triq Raymond Caruana)	Roman Catholic			
Gżira	Church	Bible Baptist Church	Central Region	Madonna tal-Ġebla Street, Kappara	Baptist		Bible Baptist Church, Gżira	
Gżira	Chapel	St Anthony of Padua	Central Region	Fort Manoel	Roman Catholic		Chapel of St Anthony of Padua, Fort Manoel	
Gżira	Church	Christ the Redeemer	Central Region	St Albert Street (Triq San Albert)	Roman Catholic			
Gżira	Church	Our Lady, Star of the Sea	Central Region	St Albert Street (Triq San Albert)	Roman Catholic			
Ħamrun	Church	Our Lady of Sorrows	Southern Region	Abela Scolaro Street (Triq Abela Scolaro)	Roman Catholic			
Ħamrun	Church	Our Lady of Tas-Samra	Southern Region	Triq Atocja	Roman Catholic			
Ħamrun	Church	St Francis of Assisi	Southern Region	Villambrosa Street (Triq Villambrosa)	Roman Catholic	4 October	Church of St Francis of Assisi, Ħamrun	
Ħamrun	Church	Our Lady of the Miraculous Medal	Southern Region	St. Joseph High Road (Triq il-Kbira San Ġużepp)	Roman Catholic			
Ħamrun	Church	Our Lady of Fair Havens	Southern Region	St. Joseph High Road (Triq il-Kbira San Ġużepp)	Roman Catholic			
Ħamrun	Church	Little Sisters of the Poor	Southern Region	Fra Diego Square (Pjazza Fra Diego)	Roman Catholic			
Iklin	Chapel	St Michael	Central Region	St Michael Street (Triq San Mikiel)	Roman Catholic			
Isla	Church	Holy Cross	South Eastern Region	Crucifix Street (Triq il-Kurcifiss)	Roman Catholic			
Isla	Church	St Julian the Hospitaller	South Eastern Region	St Julian Street (Triq San Ġiljan)	Roman Catholic			
Isla	Church	St Philip Neri	South Eastern Region	Two Arches Street (Triq iż-Żewġ Mini)	Roman Catholic			
Isla	Church	Purification of Our Lady	South Eastern Region	Victory Street (Triq il-Vitorja)	Roman Catholic			
Kalkara	Church	Għammieq Valley	South Eastern Region		Roman Catholic			
Kalkara	Church	Saint Barbara	South Eastern Region	Triq Santa Liberata	Roman Catholic			
Kalkara	Chapel	Saint Nicholas	South Eastern Region	Fort Ricasoli	Roman Catholic		Chapel of St Nicholas, Fort Ricasoli	
Kalkara	Chapel	Transfiguration of Jesus (Our Saviour)	South Eastern Region	Naval Hospital Street (Triq l-Isptar Navali)	Roman Catholic			
Kalkara	Chapel; Deconsecrated	Saint Luke	South Eastern Region	RNH Bighi	None; Formerly Church of England			
Comino	Church	Return from Egypt	Gozo Region	Comino	Roman Catholic	3rd Sunday of August	Comino Chapel	
Kerċem	Church	Saint Lucy	Gozo Region	St Lucy Square (Pjazza Santa Luċija), Santa Luċija hamlet	Roman Catholic	Sunday nearest 13 December	St Lucy's Church, Gozo	
Kirkop	Chapel	Annunciation	Southern Region	St John Street (Triq San Ġwann)	Roman Catholic			
Lija	Church	Our Lady of Miracles	Central Region	Annibale Preca Street (Triq Annibale Preca)	Roman Catholic			
Lija	Church	Transfiguration of Jesus (Old Parish Church)	Central Region	Triq is-Salvatur	Roman Catholic			
Lija	Church	St Andrew	Central Region	(Triq il-Kbira)	Roman Catholic			
Lija	Chapel	Assumption of Mary (Ta' Duna)	Central Region	St Andrew Street (Triq Sant' Andrija)	Roman Catholic			
Lija	Church	Nativity of Mary (Tal-Belliegħa)	Central Region		Roman Catholic			
Lija	Church	Saint Peter	Central Region		Roman Catholic			
Lija	Church	Immaculate Conception	Central Region	Triq il-Kuncizzjoni	Roman Catholic			
Luqa	Church	Our Lady of Mount Carmel	Southern Region	New Street (Triq il-Gdida)	Roman Catholic			
Luqa	Chapel	St James the Greater (F'Ħal Fuqani)	Southern Region	Ħal Luqa Street (Triq Ħal-Luqa)	Roman Catholic			
Luqa	Chapel	Assumption of Mary (Tal-Ftajjar)	Southern Region	Carmel Street (Triq il-Karmnu)	Roman Catholic			
Luqa	Chapel	Our Lady of Victories	Southern Region	Victory Street (Triq tal-Vitorja); Ħal Farruġ	Roman Catholic			
Luqa	Church	Sacred Heart	Southern Region	St Vincent de Paul Residence	Roman Catholic			
Luqa	Church	St Bartholomew	Southern Region	St Vincent de Paul Residence	Roman Catholic			
Luqa	Chapel	Assumption of Mary	Southern Region	Luqa Barracks	Roman Catholic			
Luqa	Church	Nativity of Mary (Formerly Saint Christopher)	Southern Region	Luqa Barracks	Roman Catholic; Formerly Church of England			
Marsa	Church	Sacred Heart	South Eastern Region	Prince Albert Street (Triq il-Princep Albertu)	Roman Catholic			
Marsa	Church	Our Lady of Graces (Ta' Ċelju)	South Eastern Region	Church Wharf Street (Triq Il-Moll tal-Knisja)	Roman Catholic			
Marsa	Chapel	Assumption of Mary (Ta' Ċeppuna)	South Eastern Region	Marsa Sports Club	Roman Catholic			
Marsa	Chapel	Our Lady Of Sorrows	South Eastern Region	Racecourse Street (Triq it-Tiġrija)	Roman Catholic			
Marsaskala	Church	Saint Cajetan	South Eastern Region	St. Thomas Bay Road (Triq id-Daħla ta' San Tumas)	Roman Catholic			
Marsaskala	Church	Saint Anne (Old Parish Church)	South Eastern Region		Roman Catholic			
Marsaskala	Church	Our Lady of Consolation	South Eastern Region	Żonqor Street (Triq iż-Żonqor)	Roman Catholic			
Marsaskala	Chapel	Our Lady of the Rosary (Tal-Barunissa)	South Eastern Region	St Anne Street (Triq Sant' Anna)	Roman Catholic			
Marsaskala	Chapel	St Anthony of Padua	South Eastern Region	St Anthony Family Park	Roman Catholic			
Marsaskala	Chapel	Our Lady of Light	South Eastern Region	Gholja tal-Bidni	Roman Catholic			
Marsaxlokk	Church	Our Lady of the Snows	South Eastern Region	Delimara Road (Triq Delimara), Tas-Silġ Area	Roman Catholic			
Marsaxlokk	Chapel	St Peter of Verona	South Eastern Region	Żejtun Road (Triq iż-Żejtun)	Roman Catholic			
Marsaxlokk	Chapel	St Paul	South Eastern Region	Xrobb l-Għaġin	Roman Catholic			
Mdina	Chapel	Saint Agatha	Northern Region	Villegaignon Street (Triq Villegaignon)	Roman Catholic	21 January	St Agatha's Chapel, Mdina	
Mdina	Church	Annunciation	Northern Region	Villegaignon Street (Triq Villegaignon)	Roman Catholic	25 March	Annunciation Church, Mdina	
Mdina	Chapel	Saint Nicholas	Northern Region	St Nicholas Street (Triq San Nikola)	Roman Catholic		St Nicholas Chapel, Mdina	
Mdina	Church	Saint Peter	Northern Region	Villegaignon Street (Triq Villegaignon)	Roman Catholic		St Peter's Church and Monastery, Mdina	
Mdina	Chapel	St Peter in Chains	Northern Region	St Peter Street (Triq San Pietru)	Roman Catholic			
Mdina	Chapel	Saint Roch	Northern Region	Villegaignon Street (Triq Villegaignon)	Roman Catholic		St Roque's Church, Mdina	
Mdina	Chapel	Visitation	Northern Region	Inguanez Street (Triq Inguanez)	Roman Catholic			
Mellieħa	Church	Immaculate Conception	Northern Region	Armier Street (Triq l-Armier)	Roman Catholic			
Mellieħa	Chapel - Deconsecrated	Royal Naval Military Chapel	Northern Region	Għajn Tuffieħa Barracks	Church of England			
Mellieħa	Chapel - Deconsecrated	Army Chapel	Northern Region	Il-Fawwara Għajn Tuffieħa	Church of England			
Mellieħa	Chapel	Saint Joseph (Old Parish Church)	Northern Region	Manikata The Old Church (Knisja Il-Qadima)	Roman Catholic			
Mellieħa	Church	Nativity of Mary	Northern Region	Pope John Paul II Square {Pjazza Papa Gwanni Pawlu II)	Roman Catholic	8 September	Sanctuary of Our Lady of Mellieħa	
Mellieħa	Church	Our Lady of Redemption	Northern Region	Selmun Area	Roman Catholic			
Mġarr	Church	Saint Anne	Northern Region	Żebbiegħ Square (Misraħ iż-Żebbiegħ) Żebbiegħ	Roman Catholic			
Mġarr	Chapel	Our Lady of Itria / Hodegetria	Northern Region	Triq San Pawl tal-Qliegħa; Binġemma	Roman Catholic			
Mosta	Chapel	Saint Andrew	Northern Region	Qares Street (Triq il-Qares)	Roman Catholic			
Mosta	Church	Saint Andrew	Northern Region	Trinkatur Street (Triq it-Trinkatur)	Roman Catholic			
Mosta	Church	Christ the Redeemer	Northern Region	Midbah Street (Triq il-Midbah)	Roman Catholic			
Mosta	Chapel	St Anthony of Egypt	Northern Region	St Anthony Street (Triq San Anton Abbati)	Roman Catholic			
Mosta	Church	Holy Family	Northern Region	Bidnija	Roman Catholic			
Mosta	Chapel	Immaculate Conception	Northern Region	Ta' Qali Street (Triq Ta' Qali)	Roman Catholic			
Mosta	Chapel	Saint Leonard	Northern Region	St Leonard Square (Pjazza San Anard)	Roman Catholic			
Mosta	Chapel	St Margaret	Northern Region		Roman Catholic			
Mosta	Church	Saint Monica	Northern Region	Anglu Gatt Street (Triq Anglu Gatt)	Roman Catholic			
Mosta	Church	Mother of the Church; Ta' Mlit	Northern Region	Cinju Street (Triq ic-Cinju)	Roman Catholic			
Mosta	Church	Our Lady of Hope	Northern Region	Glormu Cassar Street (Triq Glormu Cassar)	Roman Catholic		Church of Our Lady of Hope, Mosta	
Mosta	Church	Our Lady of Mount Carmel	Northern Region	Hope Street (Triq tal-Isperanza)	Roman Catholic			
Mosta	Chapel	St Paul; Tal-Qlejgħa	Northern Region	Chadwick Lakes	Roman Catholic			
Mosta	Chapel	St Paul the Hermit	Northern Region	Wied il-Għasel	Roman Catholic		Chapel of St Paul the Hermit, Wied il-Għasel	
Mosta	Chapel	St Sylvester I	Northern Region	Independence Street (Vjal l-Indipendenza)	Roman Catholic			
Mosta	Chapel	Visitation	Northern Region	Tower Road (Triq it-Torri)	Roman Catholic			
Mosta	Church		Northern Region	Hope Street (Triq l-Isperanza)	The Church of Jesus Christ of Latter-day Saints			
Mosta	Church		Northern Region	Eucharistic Congress Street (Triq il-Kungress Ewkaristiku)	Evangelical Baptist Church			
Mqabba	Chapel	St Basil the Great	Southern Region	St Basil Street (Triq San Bazilju)	Roman Catholic		Chapel of St Basil, Mqabba	
Mqabba	Chapel	St Catherine of Alexandria	Southern Region	St Catherine Street (Triq Santa Katarina)	Roman Catholic		St Catherine's Chapel, Mqabba	
Mqabba	Chapel	St Michael	Southern Region	St Basil Street (Triq San Bazilju)	Roman Catholic		St Michael's Chapel, Mqabba	
Mqabba	Chapel	Our Lady of Sorrow	Southern Region	Parish Street (Triq il-Parrocca)	Roman Catholic		Our Lady of Sorrows Chapel, Mqabba	
Msida	Chapel	Immaculate Conception; Old Church	Central Region	(Triq il-Kuncizzjoni)	Roman Catholic	8 December		
Msida	Chapel	Immaculate Conception (Old Parish Church)	Central Region	(Triq il-Kuncizzjoni)	Roman Catholic	8 December		
Msida	Church	Franciscan Sister	Central Region	Ferris Street (Triq Ferris)	Roman Catholic			
Msida	Church	St Thomas More	Central Region	At the University of Malta	Roman Catholic			
Msida	Church	Holy Trinity	Central Region	Misrah il-Barrieri Street (Triq Misrah il-Barrieri)	Reformed Baptist			
Mtarfa	Church	Saint Lucy	Northern Region	St Lucy Street (Triq Santa Lucija)	Roman Catholic			
Mtarfa	Church	Saint Oswald of Northumbria	Northern Region	Mtarfa Street (Triq l-Imtarfa)	Roman Catholic; Previously Church of England		St Oswald's Church, Mtarfa	
Munxar	Church	Our Lady of Mount Carmel	Gozo Region	Xlendi	Roman Catholic	1st Sunday of September		
Naxxar	Church	Annunciation	Northern Region		Roman Catholic			
Naxxar	Chapel	Assumption of Mary; Tax-Xagħra	Northern Region	F.W. Ryan Street (Triq F.W. Ryan)	Roman Catholic			
Naxxar	Chapel	St Catherine of Alexandria	Northern Region	Wied il-Għasel	Roman Catholic			
Naxxar	Church	Divine Mercy	Northern Region	Xaghra Chapel Street (Triq il-Kappella tax-Xaghra)	Roman Catholic			
Naxxar	Church	Holy Family	Northern Region	Lanġas Street (Triq il-Lanġas) Sgħajtar	Roman Catholic			
Naxxar	Chapel	Immaculate Conception	Northern Region	Mdina Street (Triq l-Imdina)	Roman Catholic			
Naxxar	Chapel	St James the Greater	Northern Region	Markiz Scicluna Street (Triq Markiz Scicluna)	Roman Catholic	25 July		
Naxxar	Chapel	St John the Baptist	Northern Region	St John Street (Triq San Ġwann)	Roman Catholic			
Naxxar	Chapel	Saint Lucy	Northern Region	St Lucy Street (Triq Santa Lucija)	Roman Catholic			
Naxxar	Chapel	Nativity of Mary; Tal-Vitorja	Northern Region	St Lucy Street (Triq Santa Lucija)	Roman Catholic			
Naxxar	Church	St Paul; Tat-Tarġa	Northern Region	St Paul Street (Triq San Pawl)	Roman Catholic			
Naxxar	Church	Our Lady of the Way	Northern Region	Markiz Scicluna Street (Triq il-Markiz Scicluna)	Roman Catholic			
Paola	Church	St Anthony of Padua	South Eastern Region	St. Anthony Square (Misraħ Sant' Antnin), Għajn Dwieli area	Roman Catholic	June		
Paola	Church	Jesus of Nazareth	South Eastern Region	Luqa Road (Triq Hal Luqa)	Roman Catholic			
Paola	Church	St John the Baptist	South Eastern Region	St Monica Street (Triq Santa Monika)	Roman Catholic			
Paola	Church	Saint Joseph; Tal-Apparizzjoni	South Eastern Region	Zabbar Road (Triq Zabbar)	Roman Catholic			
Paola	Church	Our Lady of Sorrows	South Eastern Region	Addolorata Cemetery	Non-denominational		Addolorata Cemetery, Paola	
Paola	Chapel	Our Lady, Mother of Sorrows	South Eastern Region	Addolorata Cemetery	Non-denominational			
Paola	Church	St Ubaldesca (Old Parish Church)	South Eastern Region	Arkata Road (Triq l-Arkata)	Roman Catholic		St Ubaldesca Church	
Pembroke	Church; Deconsecrated	Christ Church	Northern Region		None; Formerly Church of England			
Pietà	Church	Our Lady of Sorrows	Central Region	Our Lady of Sorrows Street (Triq id-Duluri), Gwardamanġia area	Roman Catholic		Church of Our Lady of Sorrows, Pietà	
Pietà	Chapel	St Thomas of Villanova	Central Region	St Augustine's College	Roman Catholic			
Pietà	Church	Our Lady of Loreto	Central Region	Bordin Street (Triq Bordin)	Roman Catholic			
Pietà	Chapel	Braxia Chapel	Central Region	Joe Gasan Street (Triq Joe Gasan)	Church of England		Lady Rachel Hamilton-Gordon Memorial Chapel	
Qala	Church	Immaculate Conception	Gozo Region	Immaculate Conception Street (Triq il-Kuncizzjoni)	Roman Catholic	8 December		
Qala	Chapel	Immaculate Conception; Tal-Blat	Gozo Region	Immaculate Conception Street (Triq il-Kuncizzjoni), Ħondoq ir-Rummien	Roman Catholic	8 December		
Qormi	Chapel	Annunciation	Southern Region	Main Street (Triq il-Kbira)	Roman Catholic			
Qormi	Chapel	Assumption of Mary; Tal-Blat	Southern Region	Triq il-Blata	Roman Catholic			
Qormi	Chapel	Assumption of Mary; Ta' Qrejca	Southern Region	St Catherine Street (Triq Santa Katerina)	Roman Catholic			
Qormi	Chapel	St Catherine of Alexandria	Southern Region	St Catherine Street (Triq Santa Katerina)	Roman Catholic			
Qormi	Church	St Francis of Paola	Southern Region	Triq il-Kbira	Roman Catholic			
Qormi	Church	Holy Family	Southern Region	Ħlas Street (Triq il-Ħlas)	Roman Catholic			
Qormi	Church	Nativity of Mary; Tal' Vitorja	Southern Region	Victory Street (Triq Vitorja)	Roman Catholic	8 September	Victory Church, Qormi	
Qormi	Church	Our Lady at Childbirth; Tal' Ħlas	Southern Region	Ħlas Street (Triq il-Ħlas)	Roman Catholic			
Qormi	Chapel	Our Lady of the Rosary	Southern Region	Triq il-Kbira	Roman Catholic			
Qormi	Chapel	Our Lady of Sorrows	Southern Region	St Edward Street (Triq San Edwardu)	Roman Catholic			
Qormi	Chapel	Saint Peter	Southern Region	St Peter Street (Triq San Pietru)	Roman Catholic		St Peter's Chapel, Qormi	
Qormi	Chapel	Saint Sebastian (Old Parish Church)	Southern Region	St Sebastian Street (Triq San Bastjan)	Roman Catholic		Old Church of St Sebastian, Qormi	
Qormi	Chapel	Word of Life	Southern Region	Kaccatur Street (Triq il-Kaccatur)	Pentecostal			
Qrendi	Chapel	Saint Anne	Southern Region	St Anne Street (Triq Sant'Anna)	Roman Catholic	26 July	St Anne's Chapel, Qrendi	
Qrendi	Chapel	St Catherine of Alexandria; Tat-Torba	Southern Region	Imqabba Street (Triq l-Imqabba)	Roman Catholic	25 November	St Catherine 'Tat-Torba' Church	
Qrendi	Church	St Matthew	Malta Eastern Region	Maqluba Square (Pjazza tal-Maqluba)	Roman Catholic	Last Sunday of September	Church of St Matthew, Qrendi	
Qrendi	Chapel	St Matthew; Small Church	Southern Region	Maqluba Square (Pjazza tal-Maqluba)	Roman Catholic		St Matthew's Chapel, Qrendi	
Qrendi	Chapel	Our Lady of Graces	Southern Region	Ħaġar Qim Street (Triq Ħaġar Qim)	Roman Catholic		Our Lady of Graces Chapel, Qrendi	
Qrendi	Church	Our Lady of Mercy	Southern Region	Mercy Street (Triq il-Ħniena)	Roman Catholic	Sunday after 8 September	Sanctuary of Our Lady of Mercy, Qrendi	
Qrendi	Chapel	Transfiguration of Jesus; Our Saviour	Southern Region	Saviour Street (Triq is-Salvatur)	Roman Catholic	6 August	Our Saviour's Church, Qrendi	
Rabat	church	St Agatha	Northern Region	St. Agatha Street (Triq Sant' Agata)	Roman Catholic			
Rabat	Church	Annunciation	Northern Region	Annunciation Street (Triq il-Lunzjata)	Roman Catholic	Sunday after 25 March		
Rabat	Church	Assumption of Mary; Ta' Duna	Northern Region	St Paul Street (Triq San Pawl)	Roman Catholic			
Rabat	Church	Assumption of Mary; Tal-Virtu	Northern Region	Virtu Street (Triq tal-Virtu)	Roman Catholic		Tal-Virtù Church	
Rabat	Chapel	St Bartholomew	Northern Region	Zondadari Street (Triq Zondadari)	Roman Catholic		St Bartholomew's Chapel, Rabat	
Rabat	Chapel	St Catald	Northern Region	St Katald Street (Triq San Katald)	Roman Catholic			
Rabat	Chapel	St Catherine of Alexandria	Northern Region	St Catherine Street (Triq Santa Katerina)	Roman Catholic			
Rabat	Church	St Dominic of Guzman	Northern Region	St. Dominic's Square (Pjazza San Duminku)	Roman Catholic			
Rabat	Church	St Francis of Assisi	Northern Region	St. Frances Street (Triq San Franġisk)	Roman Catholic			
Rabat	Church	Good Shepherd	Northern Region	Archbishop's Seminary	Roman Catholic			
Rabat	Chapel	Immaculate Conception & St Anthony of Egypt	Northern Region	Palazzo Gomerino Ghemieri	Roman Catholic			
Rabat	Chapel	Immaculate Conception	Northern Region	Wied Gerzuma	Roman Catholic		Chapel of the Immaculate Conception, Wied Gerżuma	
Rabat	Chapel	Immaculate Conception; Tas-Settifika	Northern Region	St Augustine Street (Triq Sant' Wistin)	Roman Catholic			
Rabat	Church	Saint Joseph	Northern Region	St Joseph Street (Triq San Ġużepp)	Roman Catholic			
Rabat	Church	St Leonard	Northern Region	Annunciation Street (Triq il-Lunzjata)	Roman Catholic			
Rabat	Church	St Luke	Northern Region	Nigret Street (Triq in-Nigret)	Roman Catholic	18 October		
Rabat	Church	Mater Admirabilis	Northern Region	Archbishop's Seminary	Roman Catholic			
Rabat	Church	St Mark	Northern Region	St Augustine Street (Triq Sant' Wistin)	Roman Catholic	25 April	St Mark's Church, Rabat	
Rabat	Church	St Martin of Tours	Northern Region	Triq Patri Tumas Xerri, Baħrija	Roman Catholic	Sunday after 11 November		
Rabat	Chapel	St Martin of Tours	Northern Region	Triq it-Tin, Baħrija	Roman Catholic		St Martin's Chapel, Baħrija	
Rabat	Chapel	St Mary Magdalene; Tan-Niedma	Northern Region	Republic Street (Triq ir-Repubblika)	Roman Catholic			
Rabat	Church	St Mary of Jesus	Northern Region	St. Paul Street (Triq San Pawl)	Roman Catholic		Church of the Nativity of Our Lady, Rabat	
Rabat	Chapel	St Michael; Is-Sanċier	Northern Region	Ġnien is-Sultan	Roman Catholic		Chapel of San Mikiel Is-Sanċir	
Rabat	Church	Mother of the Church	Northern Region	Emmanuele Vitale Street (Triq Emmanuele Vitale)	Roman Catholic			
Rabat	Chapel	Nativity of Mary; Ta' Casha	Northern Region	St Rita Street (Triq Santa Rita)	Roman Catholic			
Rabat	Chapel	Nativity of Mary; Tas-Salib	Northern Region	Ghajn Qajjet Street (Triq Ghajn Qajjet)	Roman Catholic			
Rabat	Chapel	Nativity of Mary & Saint Nicholas	Northern Region	Bir ir-Riebu Street (Triq Triq Bir ir-Riebu)	Roman Catholic			
Rabat	Church	Saint Nicholas; Ta' Saura	Northern Region	Nikol Saura Street (Triq Nikol Saura)	Roman Catholic			
Rabat	Church	Our Lady of the Grotto	Northern Region	St. Domenic Square (Misraħ San Duminku)	Roman Catholic			
Rabat	Church	Saint Publius	Northern Region	College Street (Triq il-Kulleġġ)	Roman Catholic			
Rabat	Chapel	Saint Sebastian	Northern Region	Nikol Saura Street (Triq Nikol Saura)	Roman Catholic			
Safi	Chapel	Assumption of Mary	Malta Eastern Region	St. Mary Street (Triq Santa Marija)	Roman Catholic			
San Ġiljan	Church	St Clare of Assisi	Central Region	Regional Road (Triq Mikiel Anton Vassalli)	Roman Catholic			
San Ġiljan	Church	Immaculate Conception	Central Region	St George Street (Triq San Ġorġ)	Roman Catholic			
San Ġiljan	Church	St Julian; Ta' Lapsi	Central Region	Lapsi Street (Triq Lapsi)	Roman Catholic			
San Ġiljan	Church	The Millennium Chapel	Central Region	Church Street (Triq il-Knisja), Paceville	Roman Catholic			
San Ġiljan	Church	Christians in Malta International Church	Central Region	Paceville	Biblical	Sundays regular	The Millenium Chapel Auditorium	
San Ġiljan	Church	Our Lady of Good Council	Central Region	Church Street (Triq il-Knisja), Paceville	Roman Catholic			
San Ġiljan	Church	St Rita	Central Region	Sqaq Lourdes Paceville	Roman Catholic			
San Ġwann	Church	Annunciation & St Leonard	Central Region	Sanctuary Street (Triq is-Santwarju}, Tal-Mensija	Roman Catholic			
San Ġwann	Chapel	Holy Family	Central Region	Alessju Xuereb Street (Triq Alessju Xuereb), Ta' Żwejt	Roman Catholic			
San Ġwann	Chapel	St John the Baptist; Tal-Għargħar	Central Region	San Gwann tal-Gharghar Street (Triq San Gwann tal-Gharghar)	Roman Catholic			
San Ġwann	Chapel	St Lazarus of Bethany	Central Region	Castello Lanzun, Sanctuary Street (Triq is-Santwarju), Tal-Mensija	Roman Catholic			
San Ġwann	Chapel	St Margaret	Central Region	Chapel Street (Triq il-Kappella)	Roman Catholic		Santa Margerita Chapel	
San Ġwann	Chapel	St Philip & St James the Less	Malta Outer Harbour Region	Prepostu Street (Triq tal-Prepostu), Tal-Balal	Roman Catholic			
San Lawrenz	Chapel	Saint Anne	Gozo Region	Dwejra	Roman Catholic	26 July		
San Pawl il-Baħar	Church	Saint Anne	Northern Region	L-Imbordin/Pwales Valley area	Roman Catholic			
San Pawl il-Baħar	Chapel	Annunciation	Northern Region	Catacombs Street, Salina, Burmarrad	Roman Catholic			
San Pawl il-Baħar	Chapel	Saint George	Northern Region	Madonna Street (Triq il-Madonna), Wardija	Roman Catholic			
San Pawl il-Baħar	Chapel	Immaculate Conception	Northern Region	Wardija	Roman Catholic			
San Pawl il-Baħar	Chapel	St John the Baptist; Tal-Hereb	Northern Region	Wardija	Roman Catholic			
San Pawl il-Baħar	Church	St Joseph the Worker	Northern Region	Xemxija Hill (Telgħat ix-Xemxija), Xemxija	Roman Catholic			
San Pawl il-Baħar	Chapel	Saint Joseph	Northern Region	Dawret il-Qawra, Qawra	Roman Catholic			
San Pawl il-Baħar	Chapel	St Margaret	Northern Region	Burmarrad Street (Triq Burmarrad), Burmarrad	Roman Catholic			
San Pawl il-Baħar	Church	St Maximilian Kolbe	Northern Region	St Simon Street, Buġibba	Roman Catholic			
San Pawl il-Baħar	Chapel	St Michael	Northern Region	Salina area Burmarrad	Roman Catholic			
San Pawl il-Baħar	Chapel	St Martin of Tours; Grotto	Northern Region	St Martin's Grotto, Wardija	Roman Catholic			
San Pawl il-Baħar	Chapel	St Martin of Tours	Northern Region	Wardija	Roman Catholic			
San Pawl il-Baħar	Chapel	Our Lady of the Forsaken	Northern Region	Wardija	Roman Catholic			
San Pawl il-Baħar	Chapel	Our Lady of Graces; Tal-Abbandunati	Northern Region	Madonna Street (Triq il-Madonna), Wardija	Roman Catholic			
San Pawl il-Baħar	Chapel	Our Lady of Graces; Tal-Imrieha	Northern Region	Wardija	Roman Catholic			
San Pawl il-Baħar	Church	Our Lady of Mount Carmel	Northern Region	St Paul Street (Triq San Pawl)	Roman Catholic			
San Pawl il-Baħar	Church	Our Lady of the Poor	Northern Region	Wardija	Roman Catholic			
San Pawl il-Baħar	Church	St Paul Shipwrecked	Northern Region	Dawret il-Gzejjer, Gillieru Pier	Roman Catholic			
San Pawl il-Baħar	Chapel	St Paul; Milqi	Northern Region	Triq San Pawl Milqi, Burmarrad	Roman Catholic			
San Pawl il-Baħar	Chapel	St Simon	Northern Region	Wardija	Roman Catholic			
Santa Venera	Church	Saint Joseph	Central Region	St. Joseph High Road (Triq il-Kbira San Ġużepp)	Roman Catholic		Church of St Joseph, Santa Venera	
Santa Venera	Church	Our Lady of the Rosary	Central Region	St Joseph Street (Triq San Ġużepp)	Roman Catholic			
Santa Venera	Church	Sacred Heart	Central Region	St Joseph Street (Triq San Ġużepp)	Roman Catholic			
Santa Venera	Church	Saint Venera (Old Parish Church)	Central Region	St Venera Square (Pjazza Santa Venera)	Roman Catholic		Old Church of Santa Venera	
Santa Venera	Chapel	Saint Vincent	Central Region	Vincenzo Bugeja Conservatory	Roman Catholic			
Siġġiewi	Chapel	Annunciation	Southern Region	Moghdija tal-Għolja, Gholja tas-Saliba	Roman Catholic			
Siġġiewi	Chapel	Annunciation	Southern Region	Ġebel Ciantar, Fawwara	Roman Catholic			
Siġġiewi	Church	Assumption of Mary; Ta' Ċwerra	Southern Region	St Nicholas Square (Pjazza San Nikola)	Roman Catholic			
Siġġiewi	Chapel	Assumption of Mary	Southern Region	Ħax-Xluq	Roman Catholic	Sunday after 15 August		
Siġġiewi	Chapel	Saint Blaise	Southern Region	Bishop's Valley (Wied l-Isqof)	Roman Catholic		St Blaise's Chapel, Siġġiewi	
Siġġiewi	Chapel	St Charles Borromeo	Southern Region	Girgenti Palace	Roman Catholic			
Siġġiewi	Chapel	Holy Family; Oratory	Southern Region	New Street (Triq il-Gdida)	Roman Catholic			
Siġġiewi	Church	Holy Trinity	Southern Region	Nikolo Baldacchino Street (Triq Nikolo Baldacchino)	Roman Catholic			
Siġġiewi	Church	St John the Baptist	Southern Region	Triq il-Kbira	Roman Catholic			
Siġġiewi	Chapel	Saint Lucy & Saint Nicholas	Southern Region	Triq il-Buskett	Roman Catholic		St Nicholas & St Lucy's Chapel, Buskett	
Siġġiewi	Chapel	Saint Margaret	Southern Region	St Margaret Street (Triq Santa Margerita)	Roman Catholic			
Siġġiewi	Chapel	Saint Mark	Southern Region	Triq il-Kbira	Roman Catholic	25 April		
Siġġiewi	Chapel	Saint Nicholas	Southern Region	Tal-Merħla in Ħal Niklusi	Roman Catholic			
Siġġiewi	Chapel	Our Lady of Mount Carmel	Southern Region	Fawwara	Roman Catholic			
Siġġiewi	Church	Our Lady of Providence	Southern Region	Providence Street (Triq il-Providenza)	Roman Catholic	1st Sunday of September		
Siġġiewi	Church	Our Lady of Providence	Southern Region	Dar tal-Providenza	Roman Catholic			
Sliema	Church	St Ignatius of Loyola	Central Region	College Street (Triq il-Kulleġġ)	Roman Catholic			
Sliema	Church	Jesus my Rock	Central Region	Dun Pawl Vella Street	Roman Catholic			
Sliema	Church	St John Bosco	Central Region	St John Bosco Street (Triq San Ġwann Bosco)	Roman Catholic			
Sliema	Church	Holy Family	Central Region	Karm Galea Street (Triq Karm Galea)	Roman Catholic			
Sliema	Church	Holy Trinity	Central Region	Rudolph Street (Triq Rodolfu)	Church of England		Church of the Holy Trinity, Sliema	
Sliema	Church	Our Lady of Graces	Central Region	Main Street (Triq il-Kbira)	Roman Catholic			
Sliema	Church; Deconsecrated	St Luke; Garrison Chapel	Central Region	Tigné Point	None; Previously Church of England		St Luke's Garrison Chapel	
Sliema	Church	Saint Patrick	Central Region	St John Bosco Street (Triq San Ġwann Bosco)	Roman Catholic	17 March		
Swieqi	Chapel	St Mary Magdalene	Northern Region	Madliena	Roman Catholic			
Tarxien	Church	Assumption of Mary	South Eastern Region	St Mary Street (Triq Santa Marija)	Roman Catholic			
Tarxien	Church	St Bartholomew and Our Lady of Good Counsel,	South Eastern Region	Main Street (Triq il-Kbira)	Roman Catholic	24 August and first Saturday of 26 April (respectively)		
Tarxien	Church	Immaculate Conception and St Joseph	South Eastern Region	Triq Hal Tarxien	Roman Catholic			
Tarxien	Church	St Nicholas of Tolentino	South Eastern Region	Lampuka Street (Triq il-Lampuka)	Roman Catholic			
Valletta	Chapel	Saint Anne	South Eastern Region	In the Fortifications of Fort Saint Elmo	Roman Catholic		Chapel of St Anne, Fort St Elmo	
Valletta	Church; Deconsecrated	Saint Anne	South Eastern Region	Fort Saint Elmo courtyard	None; Formerly Roman Catholic		Church of St Anne, Fort St Elmo	
Valletta	Church	St Barbara	South Eastern Region	Republic Street (Triq ir-Repubblika)	Roman Catholic		Church of St Barbara, Valletta	
Valletta	Church	St Catherine of Alexandria	South Eastern Region	South Street (Triq in-Nofsinhar)	Roman Catholic	25 November	Church of St Catherine of Italy	
Valletta	Church	Christ the Redeemer	South Eastern Region	St Christopher Street (Triq San Kristofru)	Roman Catholic		Christ the Redeemer Church	
Valletta	Church	Circumcision of Jesus	South Eastern Region	Merchant Street (Triq il-Merkanti)	Roman Catholic		Church of the Jesuits	
Valletta	Church	St Andrew	South Eastern Region	South Street/Old Bakery Street (Triq Nofsinhar/Triq l-Ifran)	Church of Scotland; Methodist Church of Great Britain		St Andrew's Scots Church, Malta	
Valletta	Church	St Francis of Assisi	South Eastern Region	Republic Street (Triq ir-Repubblika)	Roman Catholic		St Francis of Assisi Church (Valletta)	
Valletta	Church	Saint George	South Eastern Region	Merchant Street (Triq il-Merkanti)	Greek Orthodox Church		Church of St George, Valletta	
Valletta	Church; Deconsecrated	Saint George	South Eastern Region	Castille Square (Pjazza Kastilja)	None; Formerly Church of England			
Valletta	Church	St James the Greater	South Eastern Region	Merchant Street (Triq il-Merkanti)	Roman Catholic	25 July	Church of St James, Valletta	
Valletta	Chapel	Saint Lucy	South Eastern Region	East Street (Triq il-Lvant)	Roman Catholic	13 December	Church of St Lucy, Valletta	
Valletta	Church	St Mary of Jesus	South Eastern Region	St John Street (Triq San Ġwann)	Roman Catholic		Franciscan Church of St Mary of Jesus	
Valletta	Church	St Mary Magdalene	South Eastern Region	Merchant Street/ North Street (Triq il-Merkanti/Triq it-Tramuntana)	Roman Catholic		Church of St Mary Magdalene, Valletta	
Valletta	Church	St Nicholas	South Eastern Region	Merchant Street (Triq il-Merkanti)	Greek Orthodox Church	6 December	Church of St Nicholas, Valletta	
Valletta	church	Our Lady of Damascus	South Eastern Region	Archbishop Street (Triq l-Arċisqof)	Greek Byzantine Catholic Church		Church of Our Lady of Damascus, Valletta	
Valletta	Church	Our Lady of Liesse	South Eastern Region	Quarry Wharf (Xatt il-Barrieri)	Roman Catholic	May	Church of Our Lady of Liesse	
Valletta	Church	Our Lady of the Pillar	South Eastern Region	West Street (Triq il-Punent)	Roman Catholic		Church of Our Lady of Pilar, Valletta	
Valletta	Church	Our Lady of Victories	South Eastern Region	Victory Square (Pjazza Vitorja)	Roman Catholic	8 September	Church of Our Lady of Victory, Valletta	
Valletta	Church	Presentation of Mary; St Catherine's	South Eastern Region	Republic Street (Triq ir-Repubblika)	Roman Catholic		Church and Monastery of St Catherine, Valletta	
Valletta	Church	Saint Roch	South Eastern Region	St Ursula Street (Triq Sant' Ursula)	Roman Catholic; Romanian Orthodox Church		St Roque's Church, Valletta	
Valletta	Church	Saint Ursula	South Eastern Region	St Ursula Street (Triq Sant' Ursula)	Roman Catholic			
Victoria	Chapel	Annunciation	Gozo Region	Lunzjata Valley (Wied il-Lunzjata)	Roman Catholic	25 March	Annunciation Chapel, Victoria	
Victoria	Church	St Augustine	Gozo Region	St. Augustine Square (Pjazza Santu Wistin)	Roman Catholic	28 August	Church of St Augustine, Victoria Gozo	
Victoria	Chapel	Saint Barbara	Gozo Region	Citadel	Roman Catholic			
Victoria	Church; Never consecrated	St Benedict Joseph Labre	Gozo Region	Fortunato Mizzi Street (Triq Fortunato Mizzi)	None			
Victoria	Church	Cana Movement	Gozo Region	Fortunato Mizzi Street (Triq Fortunato Mizzi)	Roman Catholic			
Victoria	Church	St Francis of Assisi	Gozo Region	St Francis Square (Pjazza San Franġisk)	Roman Catholic	4 October	Church of St Francis, Victoria Gozo	
Victoria	Church	The Good Shepherd	Gozo Region	31 March Street (Triq 31 ta' Marzu)	Roman Catholic			
Victoria	Chapel	Holy Family	Gozo Region	Tal-Ibraġ Hospital	Roman Catholic			
Victoria	Church	Immaculate Conception; Seminary	Gozo Region	Enrico Mizzi Street (Triq Enrico Mizzi)	Roman Catholic			
Victoria	Church	Immaculate Heart of Mary	Gozo Region	Palm Street (Triq Palma)	Roman Catholic			
Victoria	Church	St James the Greater	Gozo Region	Independence Square (Pjazza Indipendenza)	Roman Catholic	25 July	Church of St James, Victoria	
Victoria	Chapel	Saint Joseph	Gozo Region	Citadel	Roman Catholic	19 March	Old St Joseph's in the Citadel	
Victoria	Chapel	Saint Martha; Tal-Għonq	Gozo Region	Archbishop Pietru Pace Street (Triq l-Arcisqof Pietru Pace)	Roman Catholic			
Victoria	Church	Mary Help of Christians; St John Bosco	Gozo Region	Don Bosco Oratory, St Augustine Square	Roman Catholic	Last Sunday of January		
Victoria	Chapel	Mary Help of Christians	Gozo Region	Republic Street (Triq ir-Repubblika)	Roman Catholic			
Victoria	Chapel	Nazareth	Gozo Region	St Domenica Street (Triq Santa Duminka)	Roman Catholic			
Victoria	Church	Nativity of Mary; Ta' Savina	Gozo Region	Savina Square (Pjazza Savina)	Roman Catholic		Church of the Nativity of Our Lady	
Victoria	Church	Our Lady of Graces	Gozo Region	Capuchines Road (Triq il-Kapuċċini)	Roman Catholic	Sunday after 8 September		
Victoria	Church	Our Lady of Manresa	Gozo Region	St Domenica Street (Triq Santa Duminka)	Roman Catholic			
Victoria	Church	Our Lady of Mount Carmel; Ta' Ħamet	Gozo Region	Ta' Ħamet Street (Triq Ta' Ħamet)	Roman Catholic			
Victoria	Church	Our Lady of Pompei	Gozo Region	Anton Tabone Street (Triq Anton Tabone)	Roman Catholic	8 May	Our Lady of Pompei Church, Victoria	
Victoria	Church	Sacred Heart	Gozo Region	Gozo General Hospital	Roman Catholic			
Xagħra	Chapel	St Anthony of Egypt	Gozo Region	St Anthony Street (Triq San Anton)	Roman Catholic	January		
Xagħra	Church	Jesus of Nazareth	Gozo Region	Ġnien Xibla Street (Triq Ġnien Xibla)	Roman Catholic			
Xewkija	Chapel	Our Lady of Mercy	Gozo Region	St Bartholomew Street (Triq San Bert)	Roman Catholic			
Ħaż-Żabbar	Chapel	St Andrew	South Eastern Region	Alessio Erardi Street (Triq Alessio Erardi)	Roman Catholic			
Żabbar	Church	Annunciation	South Eastern Region	Main Street (Triq il-Kbira)	Roman Catholic			
Żabbar	Church	Assumption of Mary; Tal-Indirizz	South Eastern Region	St Mary's Street (Triq Santa Marija)	Roman Catholic	15 August	Santa Marija Chapel	
Żabbar	Chapel	St Domenica	South Eastern Region	Alessio Erardi Street (Triq Alessio Erardi)	Roman Catholic			
Żabbar; Ix-Xgħajra	Church	St James the Greater; Under authority of Żabbar parish	South Eastern Region	Church Street (Triq il-Knisja)	Roman Catholic			
Żabbar	Chapel	Holy Cross	South Eastern Region	Alessio Erardi Street (Triq Alessio Erardi)	Roman Catholic			
Żabbar	Church	Saint Joseph	South Eastern Region	Hompesch Arch Road (Triq il-Mina ta' Hompesch)	Roman Catholic			
Żabbar	Chapel	St Leonard	South Eastern Region	St Leonard Street (Triq San Annard)	Roman Catholic			
Żabbar	Church	Nativity of Mary	South Eastern Region	Qoton Street (Triq il-Qoton)	Roman Catholic			
Żabbar	Church	Nazareth	South Eastern Region	Fewdu Street (Triq il-Fewdu)	Roman Catholic			
Żabbar	Church	Saint Nicholas	South Eastern Region	St Leonard Street (Triq San Leonardu)	Roman Catholic		Chapel of St. Nicholas, Żonqor	
Żabbar	Church	Our Lady of Tal-Plier	South Eastern Region	Tal-Plier Zone	Roman Catholic			
Żabbar	Church	Ursuline Sisters	South Eastern Region	Main Street (Triq il-Kbira)	Roman Catholic			
Żebbuġ, Malta	Chapel	Annunciation	Southern Region	Main Street (Triq il-Kbira)	Roman Catholic			
Żebbuġ, Malta	Chapel	Assumption of Mary	Southern Region	St Mary Street (Triq Santa Marija), Ħal-Muxi	Roman Catholic			
Żebbuġ, Malta	Church	Ħal Mula	Southern Region	Ħal Mula Street (Triq Ħal Mula)	Roman Catholic			
Żebbuġ, Malta	Chapel	Immaculate Conception	Southern Region	Main Street (Triq il-Kbira)	Roman Catholic			
Żebbuġ, Malta	Church	St James the Greater	Southern Region	12 May Street (Triq it-12 ta' Mejju)	Coptic Orthodox			
Żebbuġ, Malta	Church	Saint Joseph	Southern Region	Hospital Square (Misrah l-Isptar)	Roman Catholic			
Żebbuġ, Malta	Church	Oratory	Southern Region	Church Street (Triq il-Knisja)	Roman Catholic			
Żebbuġ, Malta	Church	Our Lady of the Abandoned	Southern Region	Madonna Street (Triq il-Madonna)	Roman Catholic			
Żebbuġ, Malta	Church	Our Lady of Angels	Southern Region	Angels Street (Triq tal-Anġli)	Roman Catholic			
Żebbuġ, Malta	Church	Our Lady of Graces	Southern Region	Grace Street (Triq tal-Grazzja)	Roman Catholic			
Żebbuġ, Malta	Chapel	Our Lady of the Light	Southern Region	Light Street (Triq tad-Dawl)	Roman Catholic	2nd Sunday of November		
Żebbuġ, Malta	Church	Our Lady of Sorrows	Southern Region	Main Street (Triq il-Kbira)	Roman Catholic			
Żebbuġ, Malta	Church	Saint Roch	Southern Region	Main Street (Triq il-Kbira)	Roman Catholic			
Żebbuġ, Malta	Church	Sacred Heart	Southern Region	Mdina Road (Triq l-Imdina)	Roman Catholic			
Żebbuġ, Malta	Chapel	Visitation	Southern Region	Qirda Valley (Wieq Qrida)	Roman Catholic			
Żebbuġ, Gozo	Church	Our Lady, Star of the Sea	Gozo Region	Mons G De Piro Street (Triq Mons G De Piro)	Roman Catholic			
Żebbuġ, Gozo	Church	St Paul	Gozo Region	Marsalforn	Roman Catholic	January		
Żejtun	Chapel	Assumption of Mary; Ħal Tmin	South Eastern Region	Triq Wied iz-Ziju	Roman Catholic			
Żejtun	Chapel	St Angelo of Jerusalem	South Eastern Region	Carlo Diacono Square (Misraħ Karlu Diacono)	Roman Catholic		St Angelo's Chapel, Żejtun	
Żejtun	Church	Blessed Sacrament; Oratory	South Eastern Region	Republic Square (Pjazza Repubblika)	Roman Catholic			
Żejtun	Church	St Catherine of Alexandria; St Gregory (Old parish Church)	South Eastern Region	St. Gregory's Street (Triq San Girgor), St. Gregory Estate area	Roman Catholic	Wednesday after Easter Sunday	St Catherine's Old Church, Żejtun	
Żejtun	Chapel	St Clement	South Eastern Region	St Clement Street (Triq San Klement)	Roman Catholic		St Clement's Chapel, Żejtun	
Żejtun	Church	Ġebel San Martin	South Eastern Region	Bishop F. Mattei street (Triq l-Isqof F. Mattei)	Roman Catholic			
Żejtun	Church	Holy Spirit	South Eastern Region	Holy Spirit Street (Triq l-Spirtu s-Santu)	Roman Catholic		Church of the Holy Spirit, Żejtun	
Żejtun	Church	Jesus of Nazareth	South Eastern Region	St Gregory Street (Triq San Girgor)	Roman Catholic			
Żejtun	Chapel	Saint Nicholas	South Eastern Region	Xrobb l-Għagin Street (Triq Xrobb l-Għagin), Ħal-Ġinwi	Roman Catholic	6 December	Chapel of St Nicholas, Żejtun	
Żejtun	Church	Our Lady in Child Birth	South Eastern Region	St Mary Street (Triq Santa Marija)	Roman Catholic		Tal-Ħlas Chapel, Żejtun	
Żejtun	Chapel	Our Lady of Good Counsel	South Eastern Region	Bon Kunsill Street (Triq il-Bon Kunsill)	Roman Catholic		Bon Kunsill Church, Żejtun	
Żejtun	Church	Our Lady of Mercy	South Eastern Region	Our Lady of Mercy Street (Triq il-Madonna tal-Ħniena), Bir id-Deheb	Roman Catholic	September		
Żejtun	Church	Our Lady of the Sacred Heart; Tas-Sinjura	South Eastern Region	Our Lady of Mercy Street (Triq il-Madonna tal-Ħniena)	Roman Catholic			
Żejtun	Chapel	Transfiguration of Jesus	South Eastern Region	Saviour Street (Triq is-Salvatur)	Roman Catholic		Our Saviour's Chapel, Żejtun	
Żejtun	Chapel	Żejtun Home	South Eastern Region	Daħla ta' San Tumas Street (Triq id-Daħla ta' San Tumas)	Roman Catholic			
Żurrieq	Chapel	St Agatha	Southern Region	St Agatha Street (Triq Sant' Agata)	Roman Catholic	5 February	St Agatha's Chapel, Żurrieq	
Żurrieq	Chapel	St Andrew	Southern Region	Żurrieq Street (Triq iż-Żurrieq)	Roman Catholic	30 November	St Andrew's Chapel, Żurrieq	
Żurrieq	Chapel	Annunciation	Southern Region	Żurrieq Street (Triq iż-Żurrieq), Ħal-Millieri	Roman Catholic	25 March	Chapel of the Annunciation, Ħal-Millieri	
Żurrieq	Church	Assumption of Mary	Southern Region	St Mary Street (Triq Santa Marija), Bubaqra	Roman Catholic	Sunday after 15 August	St Mary's Church, Żurrieq	
Żurrieq	Chapel	St Bartholomew	Southern Region	St Bartholomew Street (Triq San Bartilmew)	Roman Catholic	24 August	St Bartholomew's Chapel, Żurrieq	
Żurrieq	Church	Immaculate Conception	Southern Region	Immaculate Conception Street (Triq il-Kuncizzjoni), In-Nigret	Roman Catholic	8 December	Church of the Immaculate Conception, Żurrieq	
Żurrieq	Church	St James the Greater	Southern Region	Main Street (Triq il-Kbira)	Roman Catholic	25 July	St James's Church, Żurrieq	
Żurrieq	Chapel	St John the Evangelist	Southern Region	Żurrieq Street (Triq iż-Żurrieq), Ħal-Millieri	Roman Catholic	27 December	St John's Chapel, Ħal Millieri	
Żurrieq	Church	St John XXIII; Laboratorju tal-Paci	Southern Region	Ħal Far Street (Triq Ħal Far)	Roman Catholic			
Żurrieq	Chapel	Leo the Great	Southern Region	Żurrieq Cemetery, Bubaqra	Roman Catholic		Chapel of St Leo, Żurrieq	
Żurrieq	Chapel	St Luke	Southern Region	St Luke Street (Triq San Luqa)	Roman Catholic		St Luke's Chapel, Żurrieq	
