= St Agatha's Church =

St Agatha's Church may refer to:

== England ==
- St Agatha's, Landport, Portsmouth, England, a Roman Catholic parish church
- St Agatha's Church, Sparkbrook, Birmingham, England, a Church of England parish church
- St Agatha's Church, Coates, West Sussex, England
- St Agatha's Roman Catholic Church, Kingston upon Thames, London, England
- St Agatha's Church, Easby, near Richmond in North Yorkshire, England
- St Agatha's Chapel, Easby, near Stokesley in North Yorkshire, England

== Elsewhere ==
- Sant'Agata de' Goti, Rome, Italy
- St. Agatha's Episcopal Church, DeFuniak Springs, Florida, United States

== See also ==
- St. Agatha – St. James Church, Philadelphia, Pennsylvania, United States, a Roman Catholic church
- Filialkirche St. Agatha, Oberehe-Stroheich, Rhineland-Palatinate, Germany
- St Agatha's Chapel, Mdina
- St Agatha's Chapel, Żurrieq
- Cathedral of St Agatha, Catania
