= St James's Church, Żurrieq =

Church of St James
- Il-Kappella ta' San Ġakbu il-Kbir
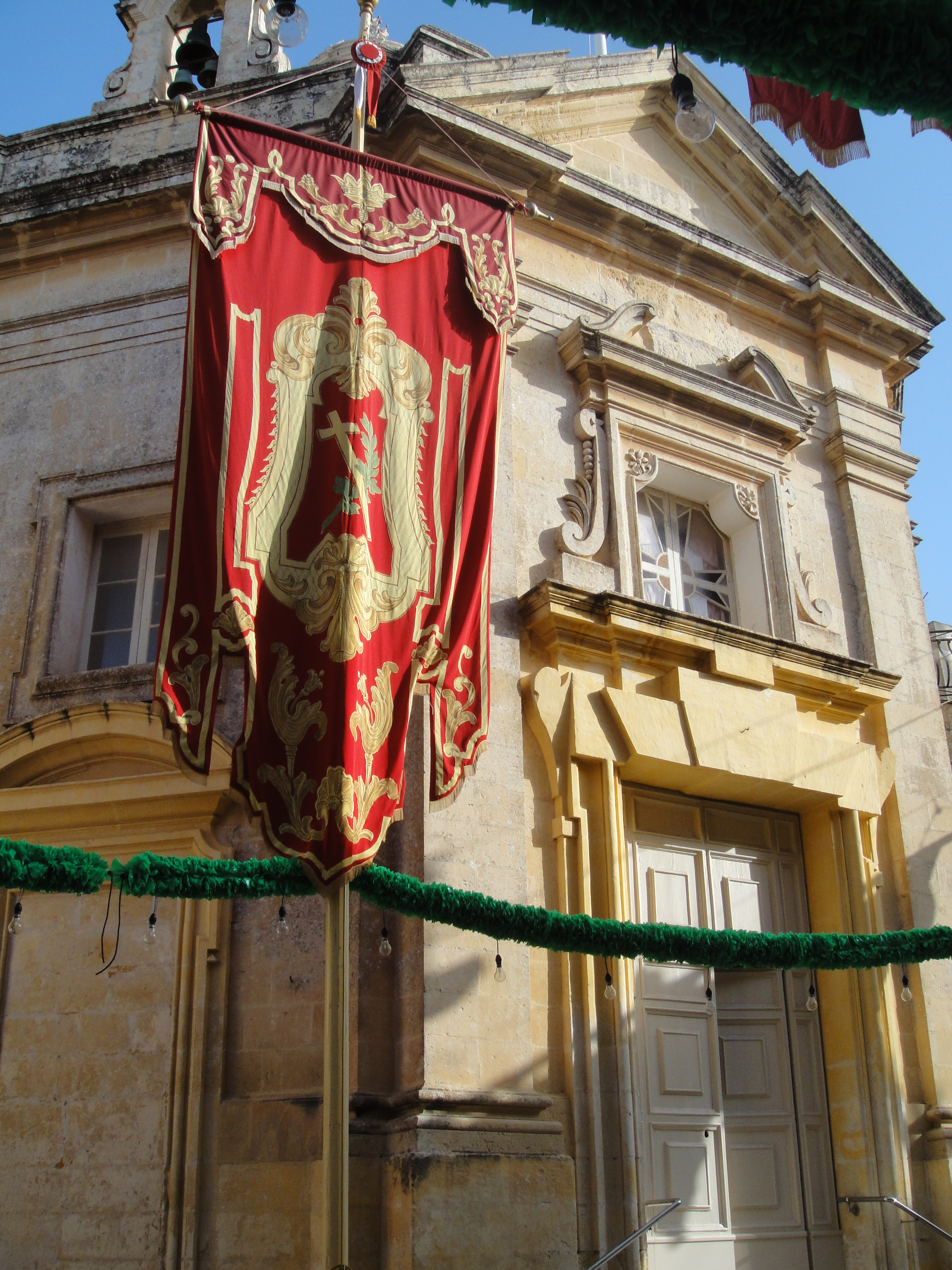

- 35°49′46.6″N 14°28′25.8″E
- Location: Żurrieq
- Country: Malta
- Denomination: Roman Catholic

History
- Status: Active
- Dedication: St James the Greater

Architecture
- Functional status: Church

Administration
- Archdiocese: Malta
- Parish: Żurrieq

Clergy
- Archbishop: Charles Scicluna

The Church of St James is a Baroque Roman Catholic church located in the village of Żurrieq in Malta.

== History ==
This church is first recorded in the report dating from 1575 during the Apostolic visit of inquisitor Pietro Dusina. Beside the original church there was another church dedicated to St John the Baptist. Both churches were demolished in the early 18th century to make way for a new and bigger church dedicated to St James. Work commenced in 1725 and was completed by June 24, 1731.

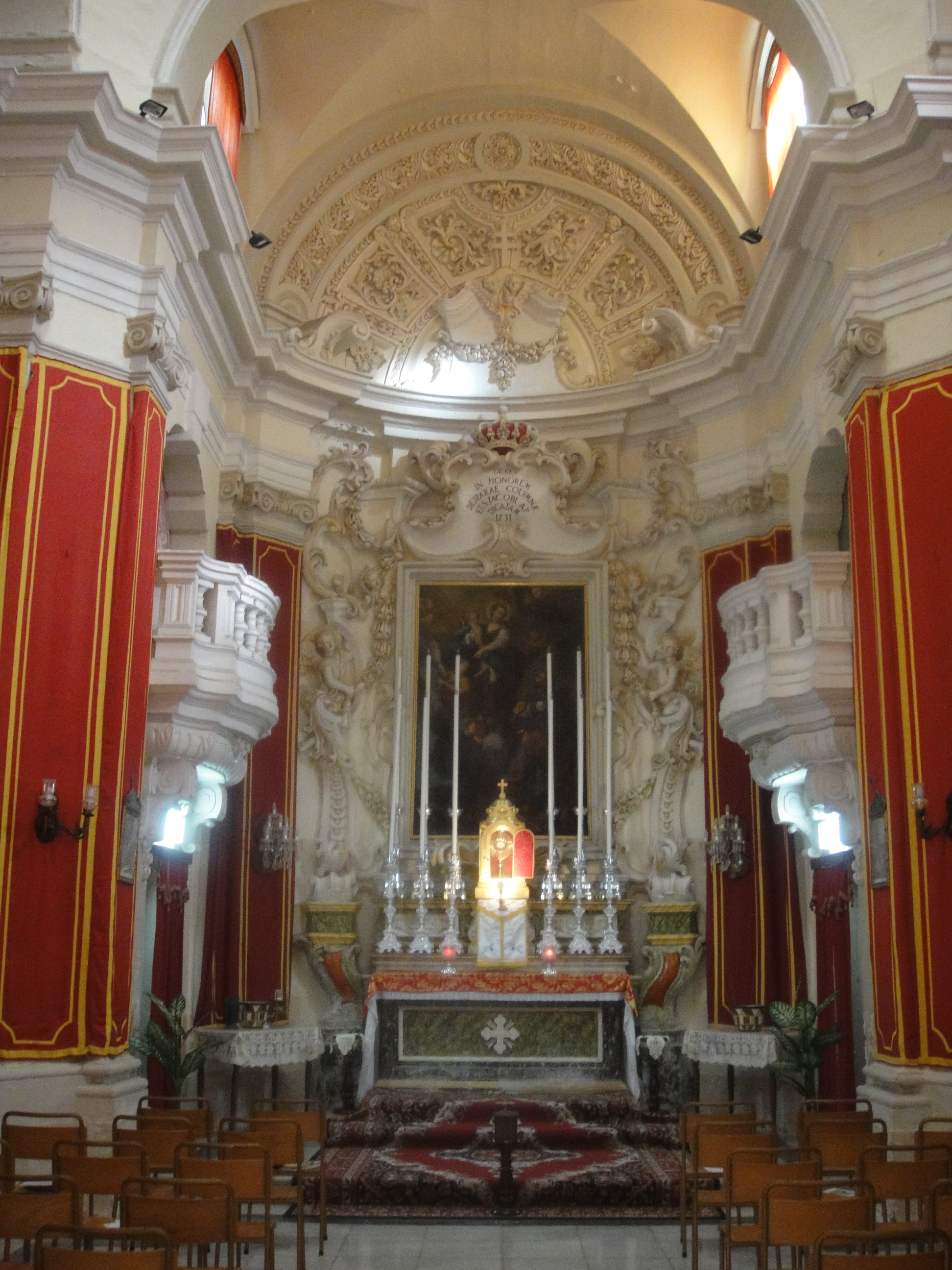
Interior of the church

== Interior ==
The chapel contains a number of works of art including the titular painting depicting the Virgin Mary with baby Jesus appearing to St James the Greater attributed to Maltese painter Francesco Zahra. On top of the painting is the date 1731, the date the church was consecrated. Furthermore, a number of sculptures and designs, attributed to Paolo Zahra, adorn the area around the painting. There are a total of three altars, one main and two side altars. One of the side altars is dedicated to the Annunciation with the painting depicting the same dedication and attributed to Francesco Zahra. The other side altar is dedicated to Our Lay of Light.
