= St Bartholomew's Chapel, Żurrieq =

Chapel of St Bartholomew
- Il-Kappella ta' San Bartilmew
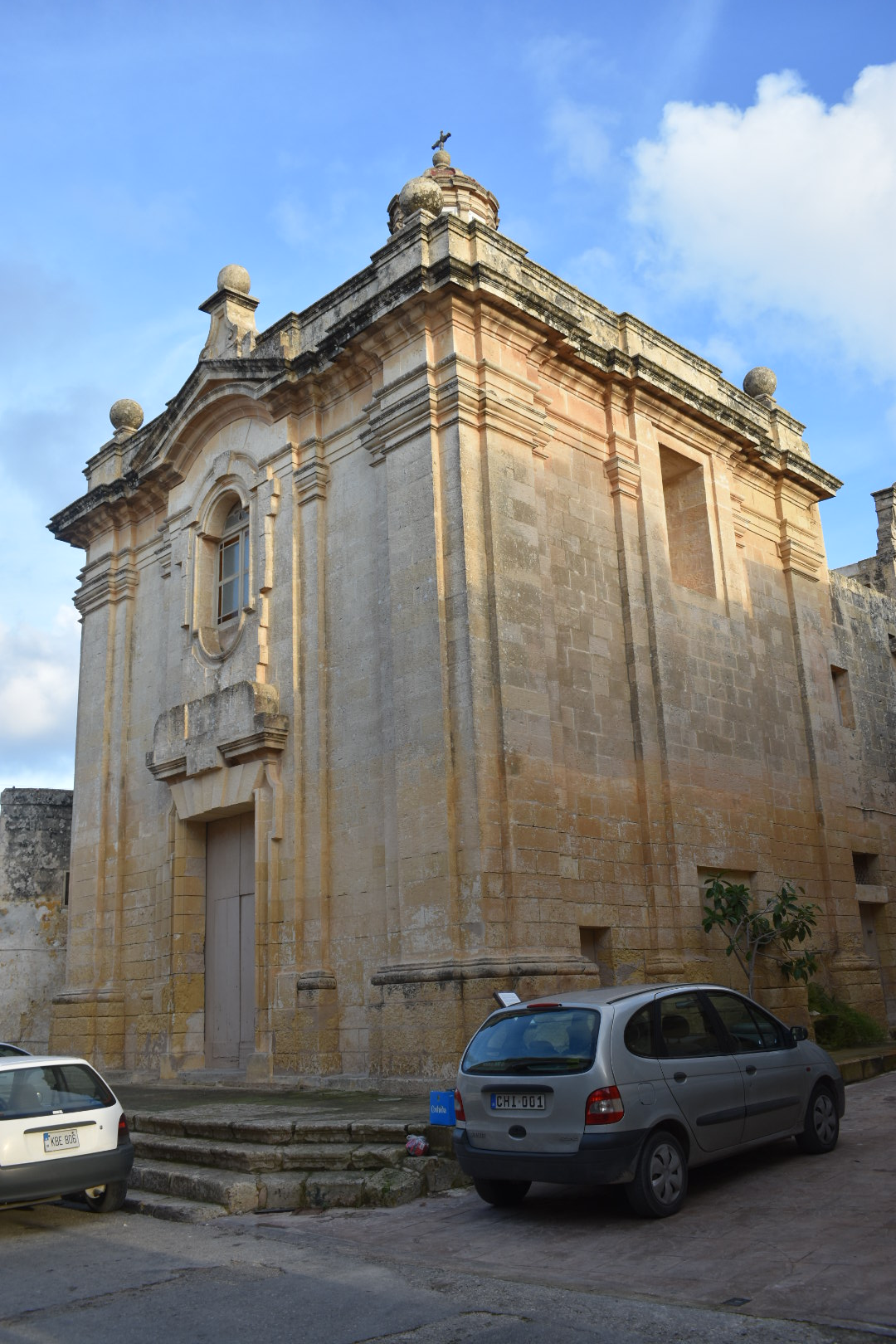

- 35°49′53.9″N 14°28′36.7″E
- Location: Żurrieq
- Country: Malta
- Denomination: Roman Catholic

History
- Status: Active
- Dedication: St Bartholomew

Architecture
- Functional status: Church

Administration
- Archdiocese: Malta
- Parish: Żurrieq

Clergy
- Archbishop: Charles Scicluna

The Chapel of St Bartholomew is a Baroque Roman Catholic chapel located in Żurrieq, Malta.

== History ==
The original chapel of St Bartholomew was built in the year 1482. It was one of the churches which the apostolic administrator inquisitor Pietro Dusina visited during his apostolic visit in 1575. Dusina reported that the church was in very good state and was equipped with all necessary things to function as a church however it lacked a rector and an income. The feast of St Bartholomew was celebrated every year with vespers and a mass, with expenses paid by Mikiel Magion. However the chapel was abandoned and by the year 1658, the Bishop of Malta Miguel Juan Balaguer Camarasa deconsecrated the chapel and ordered it closed. A new church was built instead of the old one in 1775 and was blessed by the parish priest of Żurrieq Reverend Ġużepp Agius on January 11, 1784.
