= Tal-Ħlas Chapel, Żejtun =

Tal-Ħlas Church
- The Church of Our Lady in Childbirth
- Knisja tal Madonna tal-Ħlas
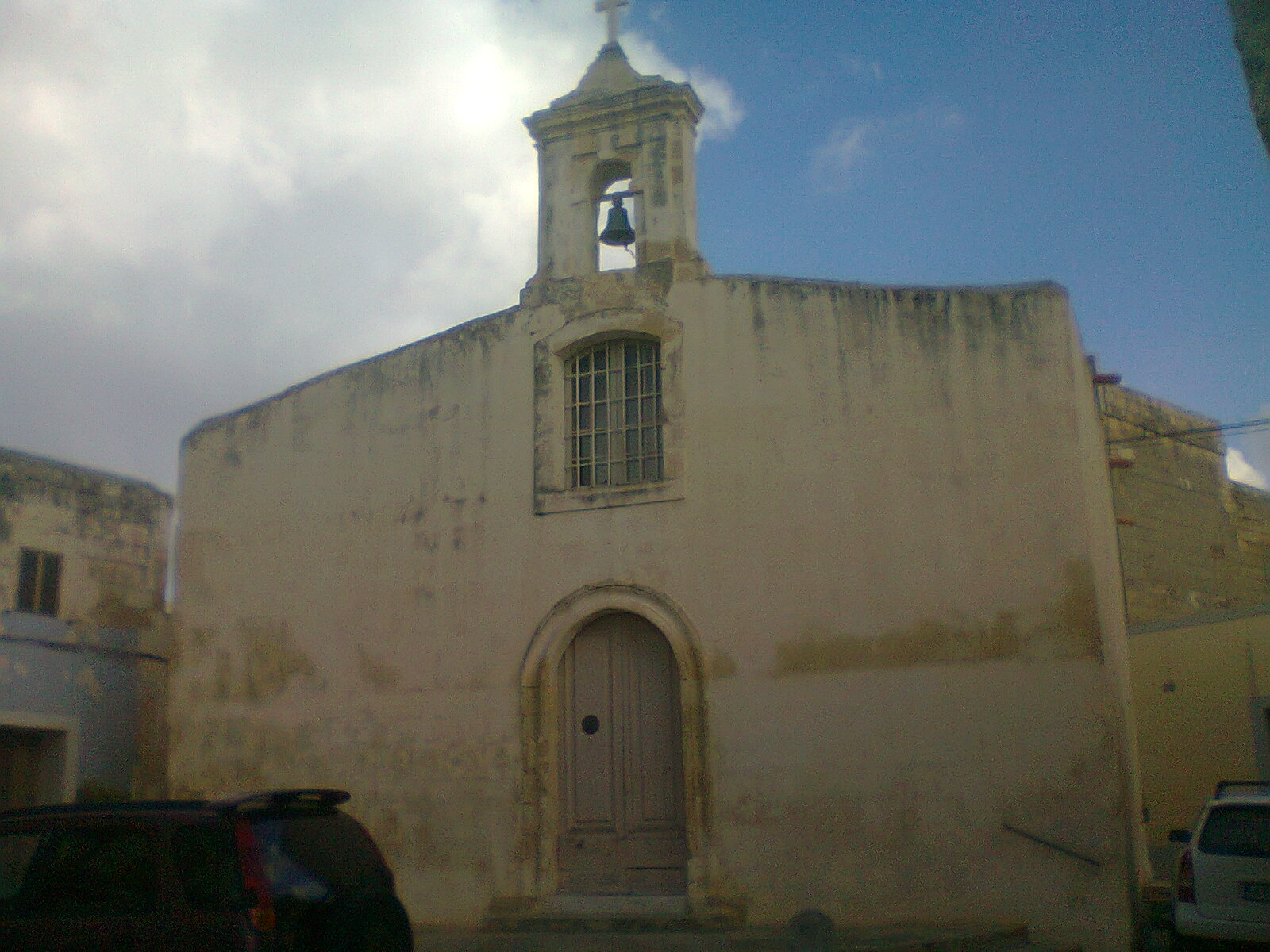

- Location within Malta
- 35°51′10.1″N 14°31′53.1″E
- Location: Żejtun
- Country: Malta
- Denomination: Roman Catholic

History
- Status: Active
- Founded: 16th century
- Dedication: Our lady in Childbirth

Architecture
- Functional status: Church

Administration
- Archdiocese: Malta

The Church of Our Lady during Childbirth or as it is more popularly known in Maltese as Santa Marija tal-Ħlas, is a 17th-century chapel in the village of Żejtun, Malta.

== History ==
An older chapel used to exist as is mentioned in inquisitor Pietro Dusina's report of his apostolic visit to Malta in 1575. At that time, prior to the formation of the current village of Żejtun, various small hamlets used to exist around small churches. The hamlet of Ħal-Biżbut was built near the chapel of St Mary. In his report, Dusina mentions that he ordered that a statue of Our Lady be placed in the chapel. The present chapel was built on the site of the old chapel in 1682 and the church was used as a burial ground for infants. It was restored in the 19th century. Many of the artwork and artifacts of the old church were transferred to the crypt of the Parish church were they still remain till this day.
