= Chapel of St Leo, Żurrieq =

Chapel of St Leo I
- Il-Kappella ta San Iljun I
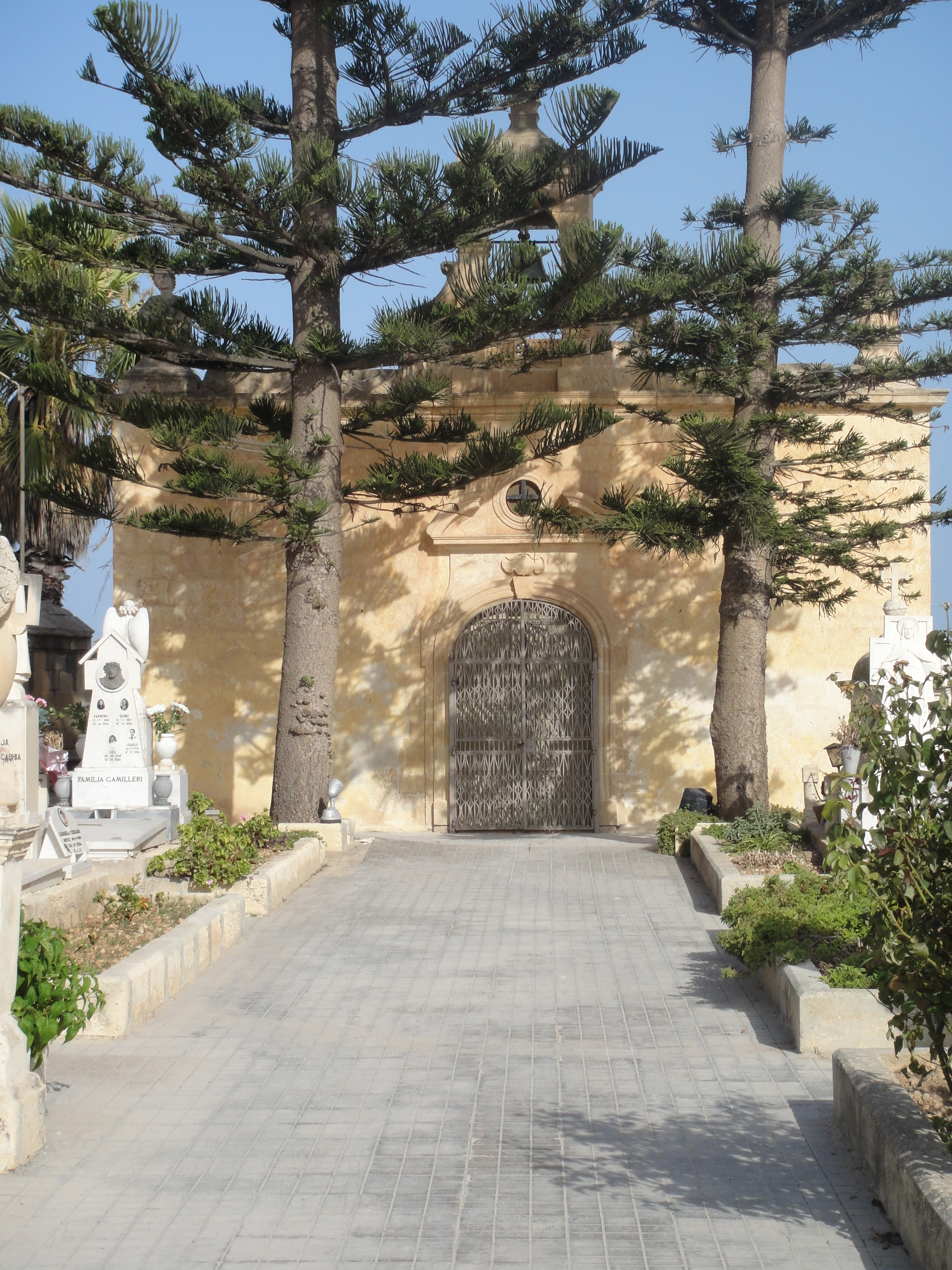

- 35°49′26.5″N 14°28′46.7″E
- Location: Żurrieq
- Country: Malta
- Denomination: Roman Catholic

History
- Status: Active
- Dedication: Pope Leo I

Architecture
- Functional status: Church

Administration
- Archdiocese: Malta
- Parish: Żurrieq

Clergy
- Archbishop: Charles Scicluna

The Chapel of St Leo is a Roman Catholic chapel is located in the village of Żurrieq, Malta. The chapel serves as the official cemetery chapel of Żurrieq. It is the only such chapel dedicated to Pope Leo I in Malta.

== History ==
The chapel was one of the churches visited by inquisitor Pietro Dusina during his apostolic visit to Malta in 1575. It is recorded that Dusina found that the chapel had suffered some structural damage and ordered the rector of the chapel to repair the damages. In 1678 the chapel was restored through initiatives by Reverend Salv Fenech. The painting situated at the side of the chapel, representing the Assumption together with two saints was also restored during this restoration.
