= Chapel of St Catherine, Qrendi =

Chapel of St Catherine
- Tat-Torba
- Il-Kappella ta' Santa Katerina Tat-Torba
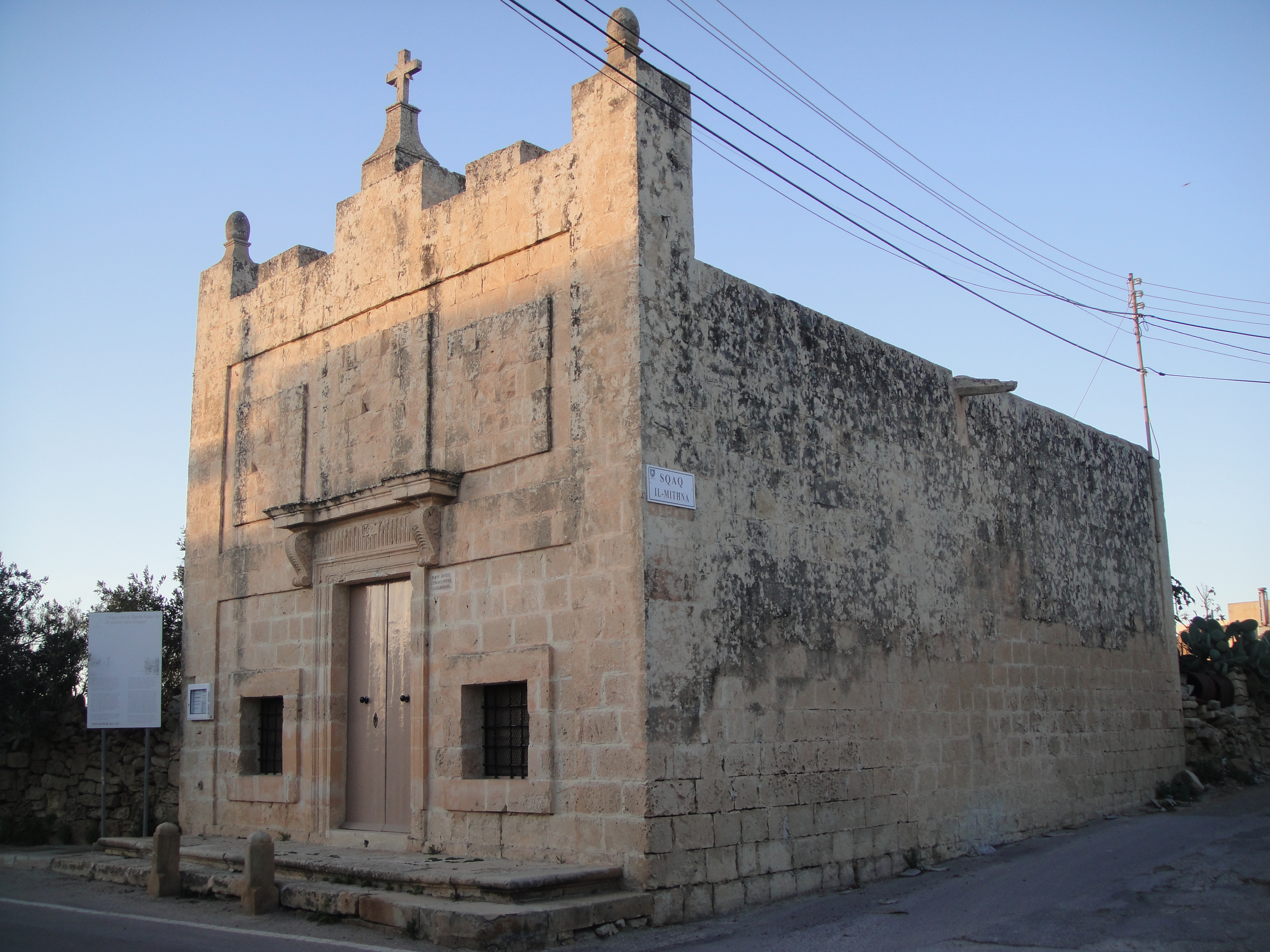
- Chapel of St Catherine
- 35°50′20″N 14°27′44″E
- Location: Qrendi
- Country: Malta
- Denomination: Roman Catholic

History
- Status: Active
- Dedication: Catherine of Alexandria

Architecture
- Functional status: Church

Administration
- Archdiocese: Malta
- Parish: Qrendi

Clergy
- Archbishop: Charles Scicluna

The Chapel of St Catherine (Maltese: Il-Kappella ta' Santa Katerina Tat-Torba) is a small Roman Catholic church located in the village of Qrendi, Malta.

== The original church ==
The first church was first mentioned by inquisitor Pietro Dusina during his apostolic visit in 1575. It is not known when the church was originally built, however it was located near an area referred to as Ta' Bieb iż-Żejtunija. The church has a wooden door and one altar. Other than that, that church had nothing else. It was seldom used apart from the yearly service of the feast day on November 25 and occasional masses being celebrated for special occasions. In 1624 the church was deconsecrated and demolished, replacing it with a cross to commemorate the site of the church.

== Present church ==
The present chapel was built in 1626 by Benedetto Camilleri, who in the notary acts of Gio Duminku Gatt, dated June 14, 1625, provided beneficiaries known as “ta' Wied il-Ħofra” in favor of this chapel. Camilleri was also entrusted in maintaining the chapel and providing it with all the necessarily liturgical things needed for the celebration of services. He was also responsible for organizing the annual feast day. The chapel was restored in 2001.

== Exterior ==
The facade of the church is divided in two parts, by the projection of a horizontal decorative masonry band. The lower part includes the door in the middle, with the date 1626 sculpted above the door, and two side windows, one on each of the door. The upper level resembles a medieval fortress, with a cross adoring the middle. The church is built in the form of a rectangle.

== Interior ==
The interior of the church was quite long for a typical 17th century church. Modifications were made in the 18th century that replaced the sanctuary with a sacristy. A wall was built around the sacristy and the altar and painting were relocated. The painting, depicting St Catherine of Alexandria which dates back to 1634, is decorated by a sculpted angels in stone, supporting the titular painting.
