= St Peter's Chapel, Qormi =

St Peter's Chapel
- Kappella ta' San Pietru
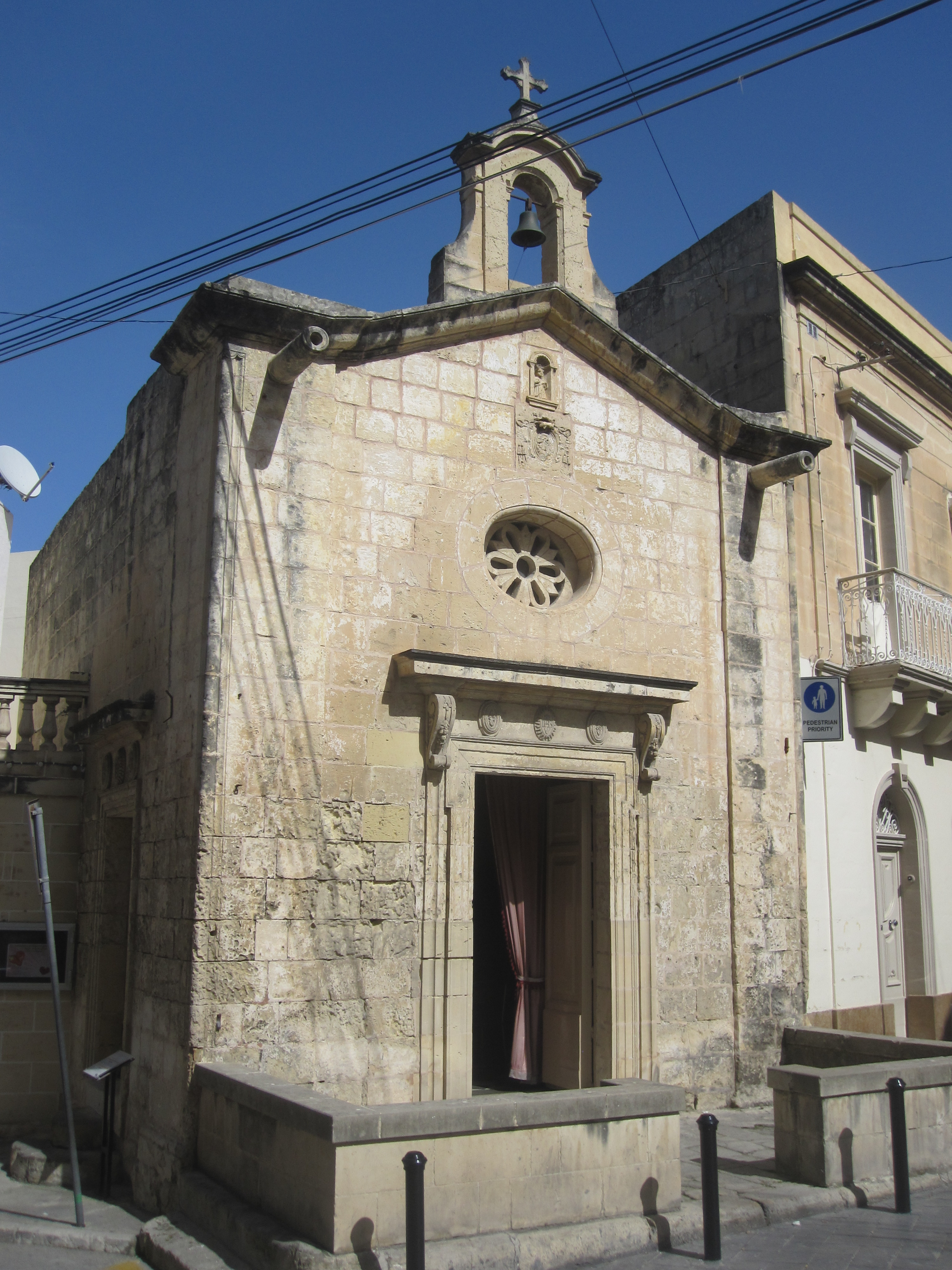

- Location within Malta
- 35°52′49.0″N 14°28′15.9″E
- Location: Qormi
- Country: Malta
- Denomination: Roman Catholic

History
- Status: Active
- Dedication: St Peter

Architecture
- Functional status: Church
- Completed: 17th Century

Administration
- Archdiocese: Malta
- Parish: St George's

The Chapel of St Peter is a Roman Catholic 17th-century church in the village of Qormi in Malta.

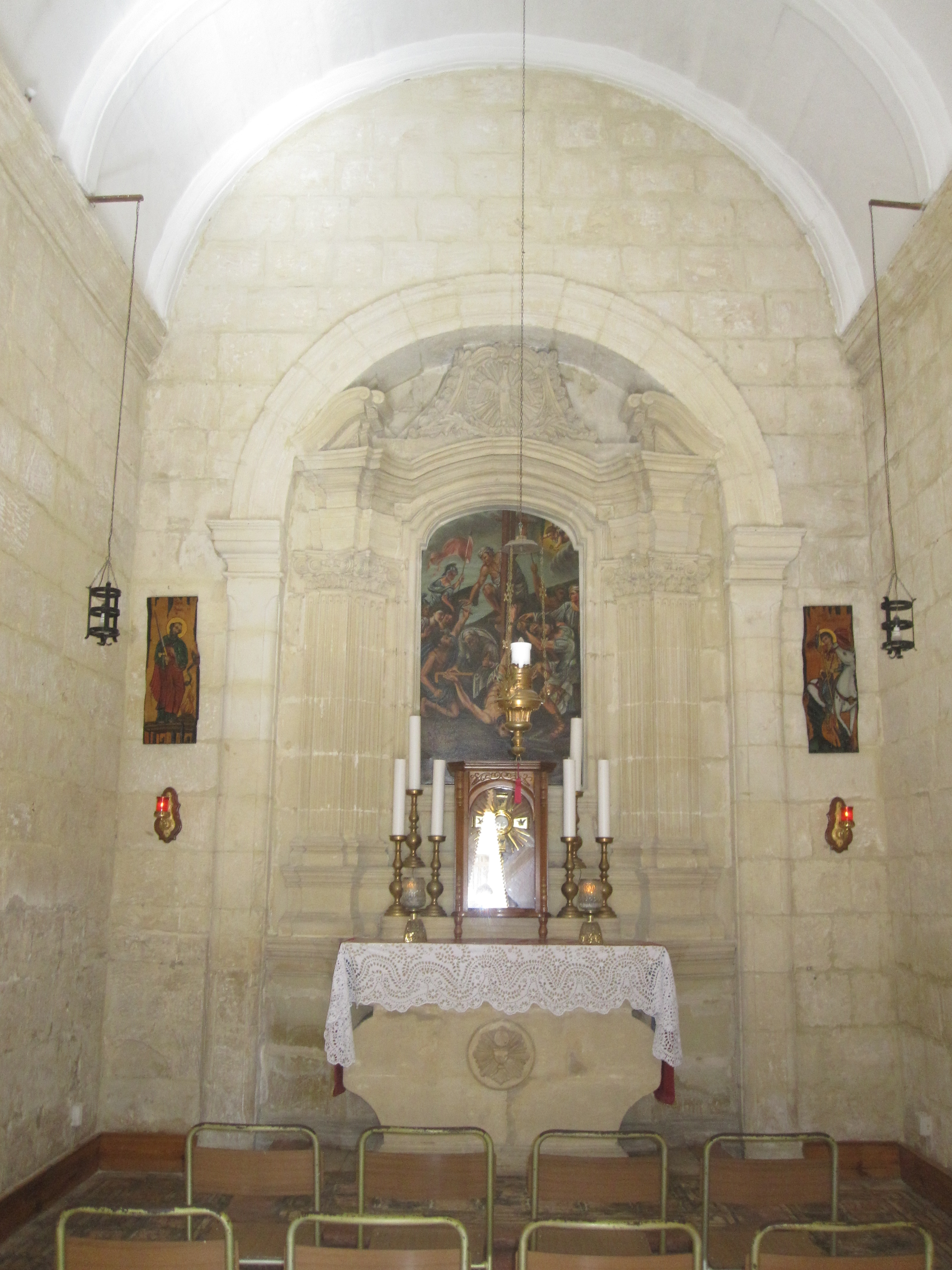
Interior of the chapel

== History ==
The original church was either built in the 15th or 16th century. It was visited by inquisitor Pietro Dusina during his apostolic visit to Malta in 1575. He recounts that the chapel lacked all necessarily things to celebrate service, had no priest and no doors but had one altar. A yearly service in honour of St Peter was celebrated and paid for by the people living nearby. Dusina ordered that all functions in the chapel cease until new doors are installed.

In 1656 Bishop Miguel Juan Balaguer Camarasa visited the chapel whilst on his apostolic visit to Qormi. He mentions that the chapel was in a very bad state and consequently deconsecrated it. It was not until a few years later that the chapel was demolished and a new one was built instead. It was funded by a local priest Reverend Pietru Cassia or Casha.

== Interior ==
The chapel has one stone altar and a painting depicting the martyrdom of Saint Peter. The painting is a copy of the original which can be found in the Parish church of St George. The copy was painted by Neville Attard.

== Present day ==
Nowadays the chapel is used for perpetual adoration of the blessed Sacrament. Prior to this the chapel was used for catechism.
