= St Paul's Church, Cospicua =

St Paul's Church
- Il-knisja ta' San Pawl
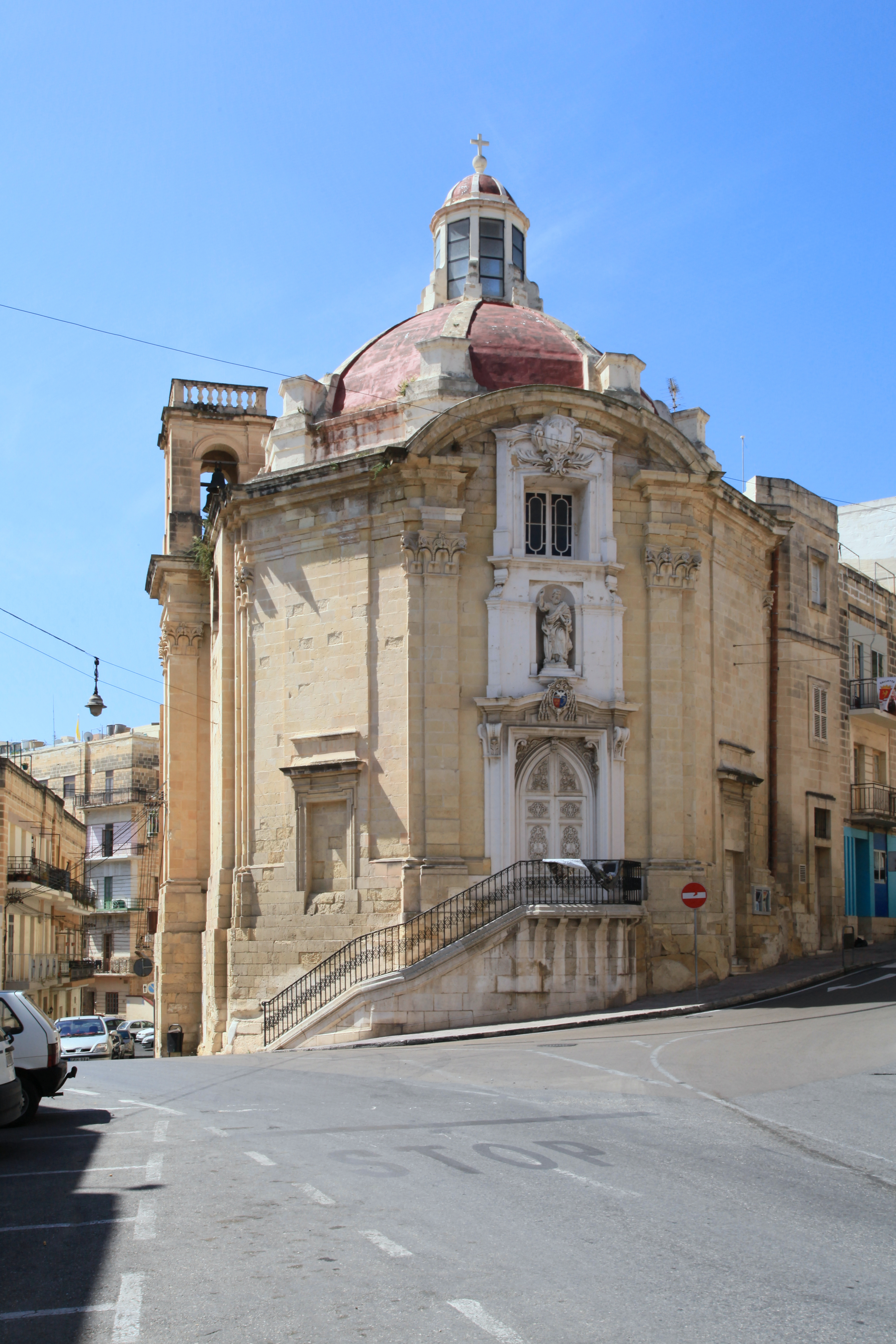
- St Paul's Church
- 35°52′53″N 14°31′09″E
- Location: Cospicua
- Country: Malta
- Denomination: Roman Catholic

History
- Status: Active
- Founded: 3 October 1590
- Dedication: Paul the Apostle
- Consecrated: 1741

Architecture
- Functional status: Church
- Architectural type: Church
- Style: Baroque; Doric
- Groundbreaking: 1735
- Completed: 1740

Administration
- Archdiocese: Malta
- Parish: Cospicua

St Paul's Church is a Baroque-Doric 18th century church located in Cospicua, Malta.

== History ==
The first known church recorded to be built on the site was built in 1590 as is decreed in a number of notary documents dates 3 October 1590. By time the church was abandoned and a new one was built in its place with the cornerstone laid on August 11, 1735, by Archbishop Paul Alphéran de Bussan in the presence of the clergy of Cospicua. The church was completed by 1740 and blessed in 1741.

== Interior ==
The altarpiece depicts the Conversion of Saint Paul. The work of Rokku Buhagiar, it replaced an earlier one by Francesco Zahra. There is one high altar and two side altars. One of the side altars includes a painting of the martyrdom of Saint Barbara, also the work of Francesco Zahra. The other altarpiece depicts the Holy Family and is the work of Ġanni VeIla.
