= Our Lady of the Sacred Heart, Iż-Żejtun =

Church in Iz-Zejtun, Malta

Coordinates: 35°48′47″N 14°31′28″E

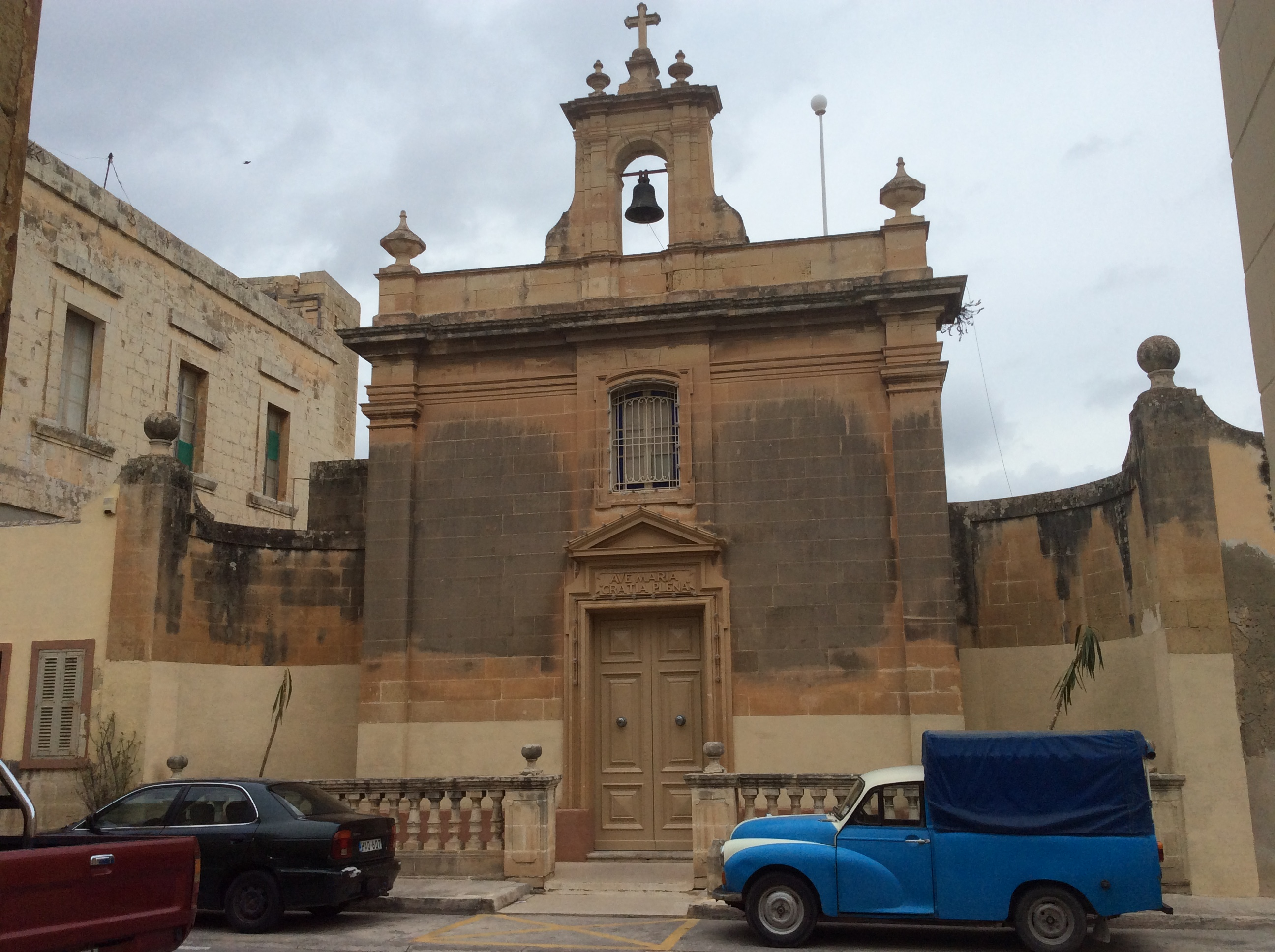
The chapel in September 2016

The Our Lady of the Sacred Heart (locally known as Tas-Sinjura (of the Signora)) is a Roman Catholic church in Iż-Żejtun in the South Eastern Region of Malta. It is dedicated to the Sacred Heart of Mary.

It is listed Grade 2 on the National Inventory of the Cultural Property of the Maltese Islands.

The chapel was completed in 1881; its construction was funded by the Noble Margerita dei Conti Manduca. A heavy cornice surmounts the plain facade with a belfry above the cornice. A triangular pediment surmounts the doorway.
