= St Publius' Chapel, Għasri =

Chapel of St Publius
- Il-Kappella ta' San Publiju
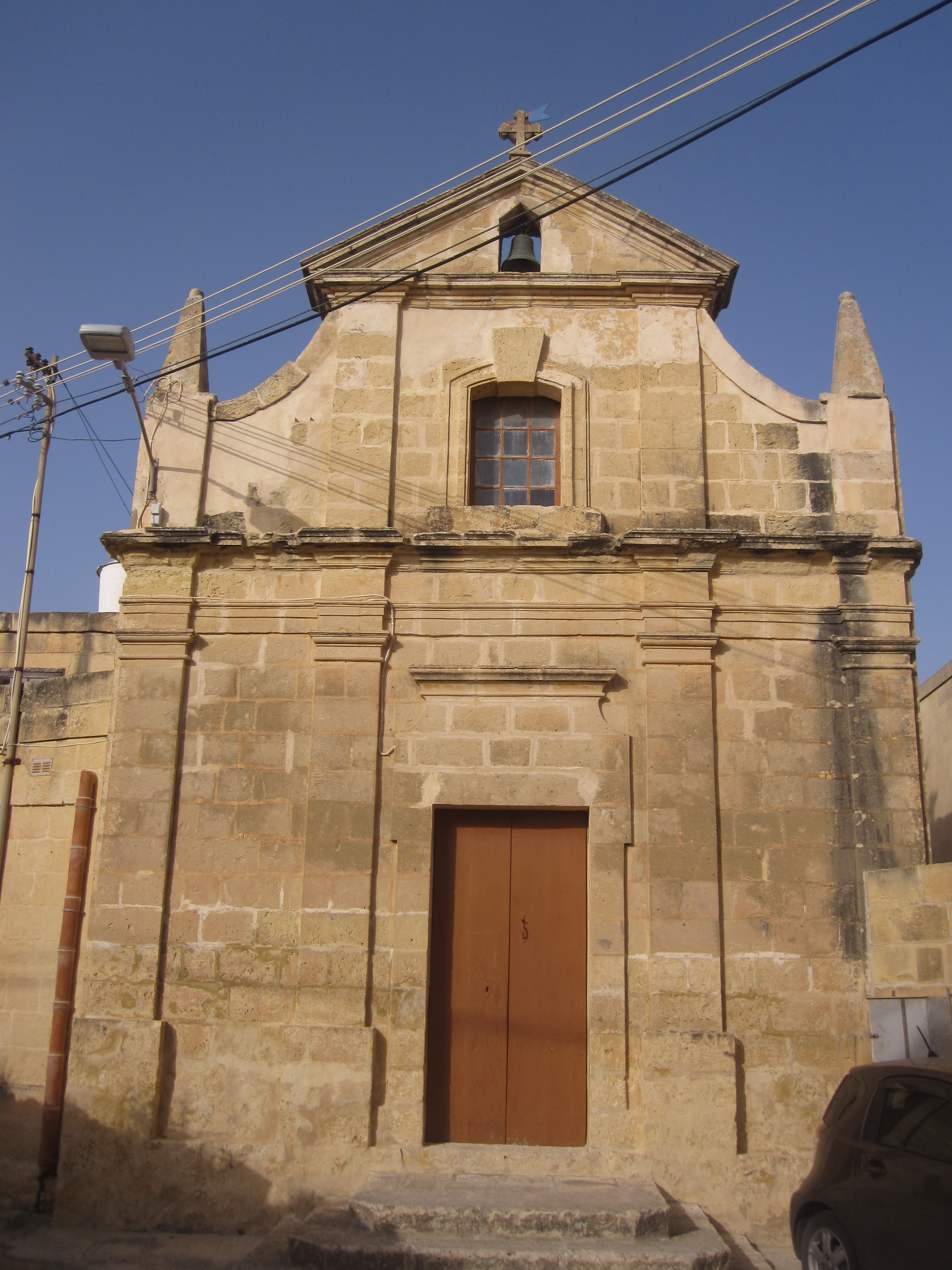

- Location within Malta
- 36°03′54.8″N 14°13′01.3″E
- Location: Għasri
- Country: Malta
- Denomination: Roman Catholic

History
- Status: Active
- Dedication: Saint Publius
- Dedicated: 10 October 1852

Architecture
- Functional status: Church
- Groundbreaking: 1850
- Completed: 1852

Administration
- Diocese: Gozo
- Parish: Għarb

Clergy
- Bishop: Mario Grech

St Publius' Chapel is a small Roman Catholic church located in the village of Għasri on the island of Gozo, Malta. Although the chapel is situated in Għasri, it falls under the jurisdiction and administration of the neighboring parish of Għarb.

== Original Chapel ==
The original chapel on this site, dedicated to St. Leonard, was built around 1550 by George Tewma and included an adjoining cemetery. However, it was deconsecrated in 1654 by Bishop Miguel Juan Balaguer Camarasa. The chapel was demolished a few years later in 1657.

== Present Chapel ==
The cornerstone of the present chapel was laid on July 26, 1850, following an initiative by Reverend Guzepp Cassar. Construction was completed, and the chapel was blessed by the Archpriest of Għarb on October 10, 1852. The building costs were covered by the rector of a nearby chapel of the Assumption, popularly known as Ta' Pinu. Unlike the original chapel, which was dedicated to St. Leonard, this new chapel was dedicated to Saint Publius, recognized as Malta’s first bishop.

== Interior ==
The chapel features a single marble altar and a painting of St. Publius. Additional artworks include two paintings depicting the Assumption of Mary and Mary as the Immaculate Conception.
