= St Luke's Chapel, Żurrieq =

Chapel of St Luke
- Il-Knisja ta' San Luqa
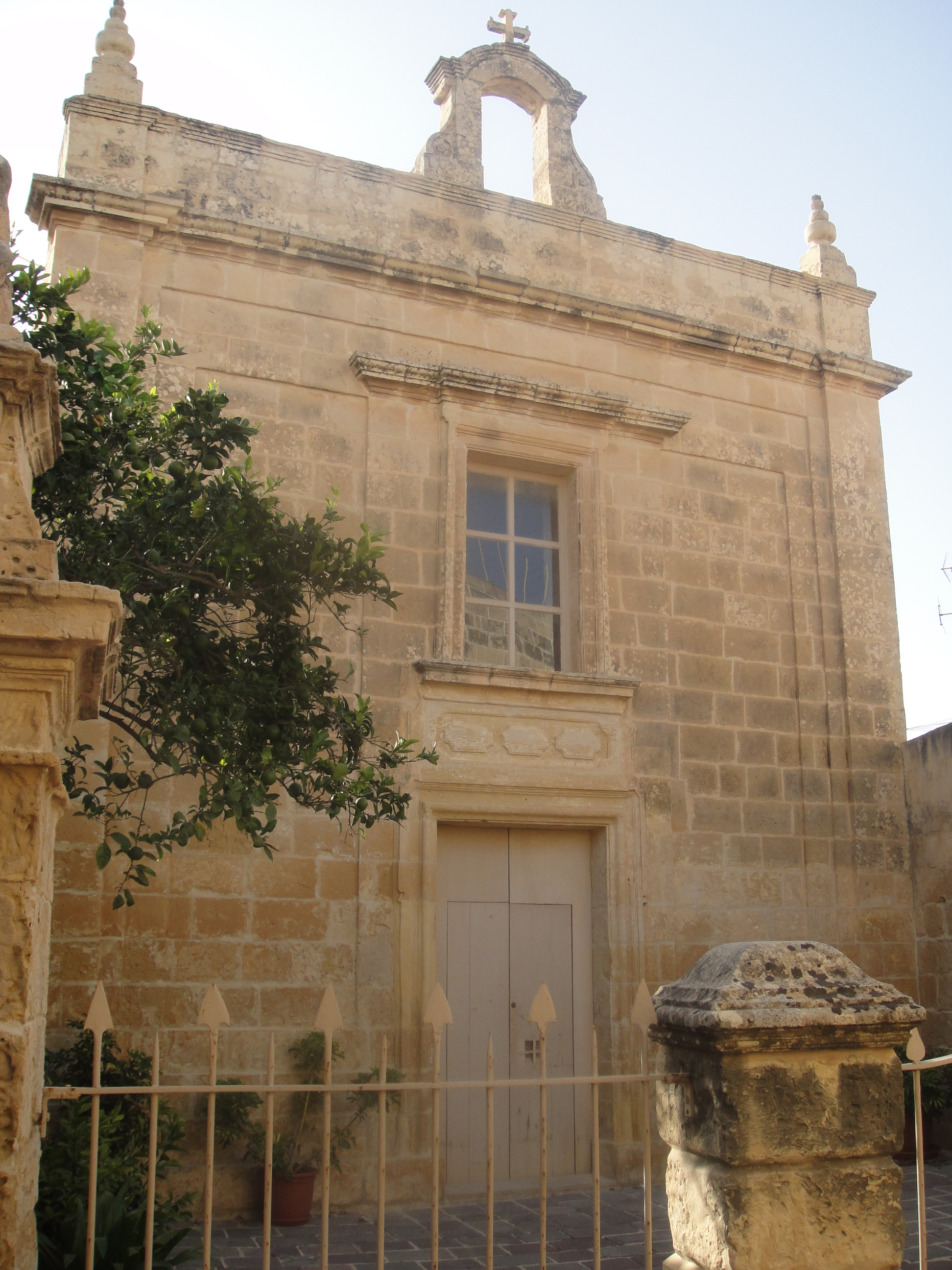

- 35°49′40.8″N 14°28′19.4″E
- Location: Żurrieq
- Country: Malta
- Denomination: Roman Catholic

History
- Status: Active
- Dedication: St Luke the Evangelist

Architecture
- Functional status: Church

Administration
- Archdiocese: Malta
- Parish: Żurrieq

Clergy
- Archbishop: Charles Scicluna

The Chapel of St Luke is one of the many Roman Catholic churches located in the village of Żurrieq, Malta.

== History ==
The origin of the chapel of St Luke dates back to the 15th century. It was donated by its benefactor Luqa Zammit in his will dated 1460 as revealed in the notary documents of Luqa Sillato. However, the present structure dates from 1814 when the church was rebuilt on the initiative of Reverend Gwann Zammit.

== Works of art ==
The chapel's main painting depicting St Luke dates back to 1743 and is the work of Francesco Zahra. Today the painting can be found in the sacristy of the parish church of St Catherine. A bust of a soul in purgatory is located near the chapel's entrance. This type of bust is usually located in cemeteries, thus suggesting the location of a possible cemetery near by in times old.
