= Bible Baptist Church, Gżira =

Bible Baptist Church
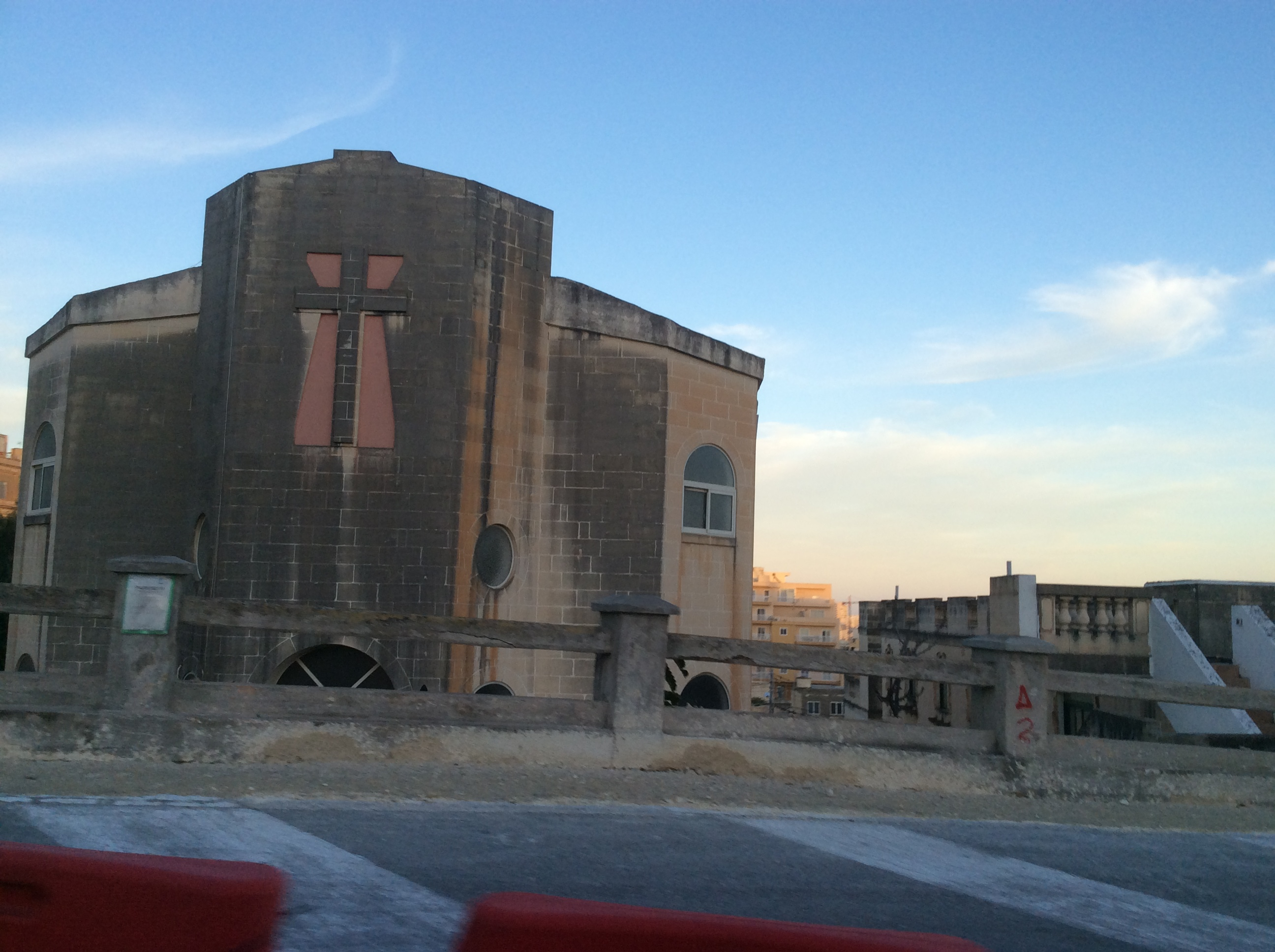
- Bible Baptist Church
- 35°54′30.3″N 14°29′27.2″E
- Location: Gżira
- Country: Malta
- Denomination: Baptist
- Website: Website of the Church

History
- Status: Active
- Founded: 1993
- Founder: Joseph Mifsud

Clergy
- Pastor: Joseph Mifsud

The Bible Baptist Church is a Baptist church located in Gżira, Malta.

== History ==
The first Baptist congregation knows its beginning in 1985, founded by Joseph Mifsud and his wife Jenny. Prior to the building of the present church, the congregation used to meet up in rented premises however, eventually, a permit was issued for the building of a new church which was completed by 1993. The first service in the church was held on April 14, 1994.
