= St Agatha's Chapel, Żurrieq =

Chapel of St Agatha
- Il-Kappella ta' Sant' Agata
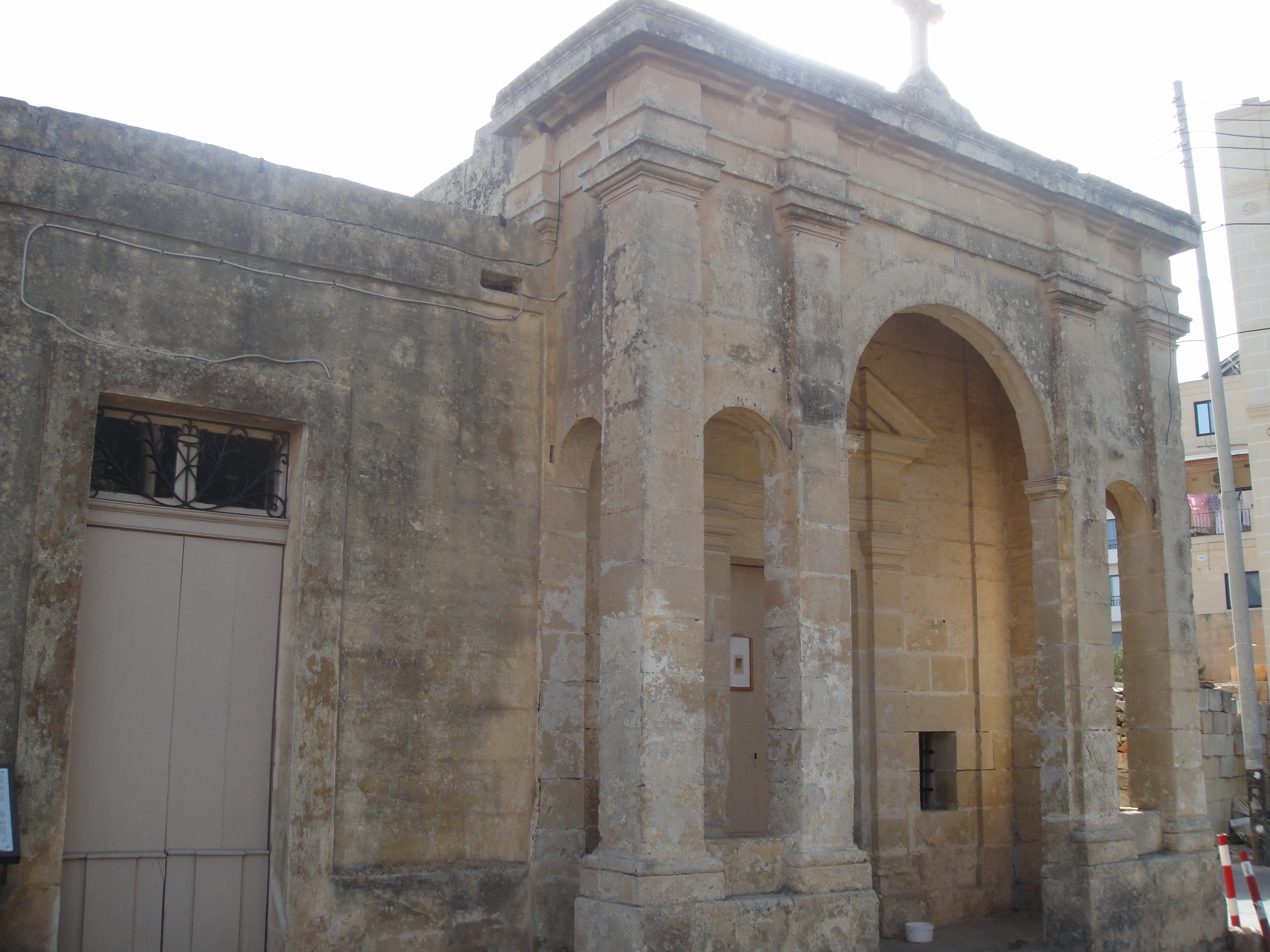

- Location within Malta
- 35°49′45.1″N 14°28′56.6″E
- Location: Żurrieq
- Country: Malta
- Denomination: Roman Catholic

History
- Status: Active
- Dedication: St Agatha
- Dedicated: 27 February 1859

Architecture
- Functional status: Church

Administration
- Archdiocese: Malta
- Parish: Żurrieq

Clergy
- Archbishop: Charles Scicluna

The Chapel of St Agatha is a Roman Catholic church located in the southern village of Żurrieq in Malta.

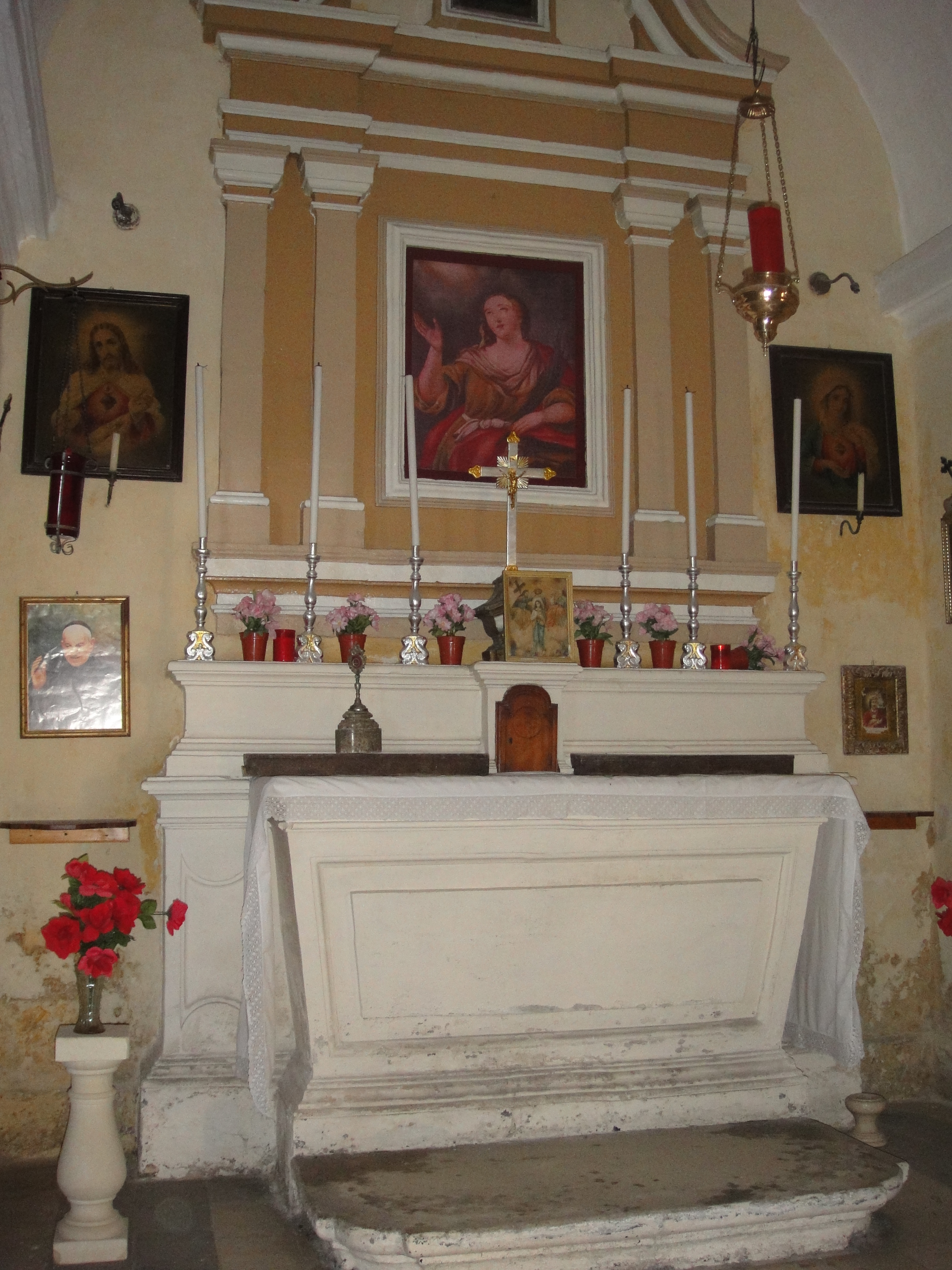
Interior of the chapel.

== History ==
The original church which stood on the site of the present church was built sometime in the 16th century. However it was deconsecrated by the Bishop of Malta, Balaguer on November 24, 1658. The present church was built by Cikku Grixti as a fulfillment of a vow made by a woman. It was blessed by the vicar general Philip Amato on 27 February 1859. The church served as a spiritual base for British soldiers during World War II. In 1952 the church was enlarged and decorated with necessarily items such as the Via Crucis and new vestments. The painting depicting St Agatha was restored by R. Bonnici Cali.
