= Pietro Dusina =

Italian Roman Catholic priest

Pietro Dusina was an Italian Roman Catholic priest from Brescia who was the inquisitor and apostolic delegate to Malta between 1574 and 1575.

Dusina was nominated inquisitor of Malta by Pope Gregory XIII on 3 July 1574, and he arrived on the island on 1 August of the same year. Prior to Dusina's appointment, the Bishop of Malta had held inquisitorial authority, but disputes between Grand Master Jean de la Cassière and Bishop Martín Royas de Portalrubio led to the Pope's nomination of Dusina as inquisitor. On 28 January 1575, the Pope confirmed Dusina's role as apostolic visitor to Malta.

La Cassière offered Dusina the former Castellania in Birgu to house his official residence as well as the tribunal of the inquisition. The building had been vacant for some years, and Dusina was temporarily accommodated at Fort Saint Elmo in Valletta and later the Dominican convent in Birgu before settling in the Castellania. The latter continued to house Malta's inquisitors until 1798, and it became known as the Inquisitor's Palace. Dusina first heard a case as inquisitor on 25 August 1574, and he retained this role for only eight months, hearing the last case in May 1575 and probably leaving Malta within that month. He was succeeded by Pietro Sant'Umano as inquisitor.

In 1575, Dusina visited every church in the Maltese Islands and kept a detailed record of them. Handwritten copies of this report are found in the National Library of Malta, the Archiepiscopal Archives and the Vatican Apostolic Archive, and they are important primary sources about Maltese history in the 16th century.

No portrait of Dusina is known to exist.
