= Erardi =

Erardi is an old Maltese surname. Notable people with the surname include:

- Alessio Erardi (1669–1727), Maltese painter
- Greg Erardi (born 1954), American baseball player
- Pietro Erardi (1644–1727), Maltese painter
- Stefano Erardi (1630–1716), Maltese painter
