= Clemente Tabone =

17th-century Maltese landowner and soldier

- Klement Tabone
- Born: c. 1575; Casal Pasqualino (now Żejtun), Hospitaller Malta
- Died: 11 March 1665 (aged 89–90); Birgu, Hospitaller Malta
- Resting place: Parish Church of St. Lawrence, Birgu; 35°53′14.4″N 14°31′16.9″E
- Occupation: Landowner
- Spouses: Helena Testaferrata (m. 1597; died 1598) Margherita Pace (after 1602) Aloisetta Veron (m. 1657)
- Children: 4
- Parents: Pietro Tabone (father); Dorothea Cumbo (mother)
- Military career
- Allegiance: (Sovereign Military Order of Malta) Order of Saint John
- Branch: Militia
- Conflicts: Raid on Żejtun

Clemente Tabone (Maltese: Klement Tabone, c. 1575 – 11 March 1665) was a Maltese landowner and militia member who is known for his reported courage in the Raid on Żejtun, the last major Ottoman attack on Malta, in 1614. He built a tower and a chapel on some of his lands on the outskirts of Żejtun. The tower no longer exists, but St. Clement's Chapel remains intact and is still in use.

== Biography ==
Tabone was born in Casal Pasqualino (today part of Żejtun) around 1575 to Pietro Tabone and Dorothea née Cumbo. He was the only son of a rich family, and had six sisters. On 18 March 1589, he seems to have received a clerical tonsure which brought him under the Church's jurisdiction, protecting him from the powers of the Order of St. John who at the time ruled Malta. Tabone did not continue to study to become a priest.

He acted as an attorney for his father during a property deal in 1596, and his father later gave him some pieces of land through two notarial deeds. He subsequently became a wealthy landowner, renting out some of his fields and buying others. His lands included a number of fields and buildings, including part of the archaeological site of Tas-Silġ and salt pans in Bengħisa. Tabone built the Ingraw Tower on one of his lands in 1603, and decades later, he used part of the land acquired in 1596 to construct St. Clement's Chapel.

Tabone married three times. He first married Helena Testaferrata on 11 January 1597 in Birgu, but she died the following year on 2 August 1598. His second marriage, on 3 February 1602, was to Margherita Pace, the daughter of a nobleman from Siġġiewi. He eventually began an extramarital affair with Aloisetta Veron, and married her on 14 January 1657. They had four children, two of whom – Dorothea and Angelo (or Archangelo) – were born out of wedlock and later legitimized. Their fourth child, Archangela, was born after Clemente's death.

Tabone and his family had moved to Birgu by 1609, but he seems to have also returned to Żejtun at some points in his later life. He made wills in 1646, 1659 and finally in 1661. He died in Birgu on 11 March 1665, and was buried in the Parish Church of St. Lawrence. His son Angelo died a day after him.

Tabone had an Ethiopian servant named Gregorio in 1646. In his later life, he had at least two black slaves, Gugliemo and Madalena, who were eventually set free.

== Raid of 1614 ==
Clemente Tabone is mostly known for his role in the 1614 Raid on Żejtun, in which a fleet of Ottoman galleys landed some 6,000 men in St. Thomas Bay in Marsaskala and pillaged the village of Żejtun which had been abandoned by its inhabitants after they heard about the attack. Tabone's exact role is unclear; some sources state that he was a member of the dejma militia, while others state that he was attacked by Ottomans on the outskirts of Żejtun. He might have lost his sword during this fight.

18th-century sources state that Tabone showed a lot of courage during the 1614 raid, but no direct contemporary sources which state Tabone's exact role are known. Tabone might have been part of the dejma that responded to the cannon fire from St. Lucian Tower after the Ottomans' failed attempt to land at Marsaxlokk, or he might have been part of the cavalry force that drove the invaders out of Żejtun.

== Buildings ==
=== House in Żejtun ===
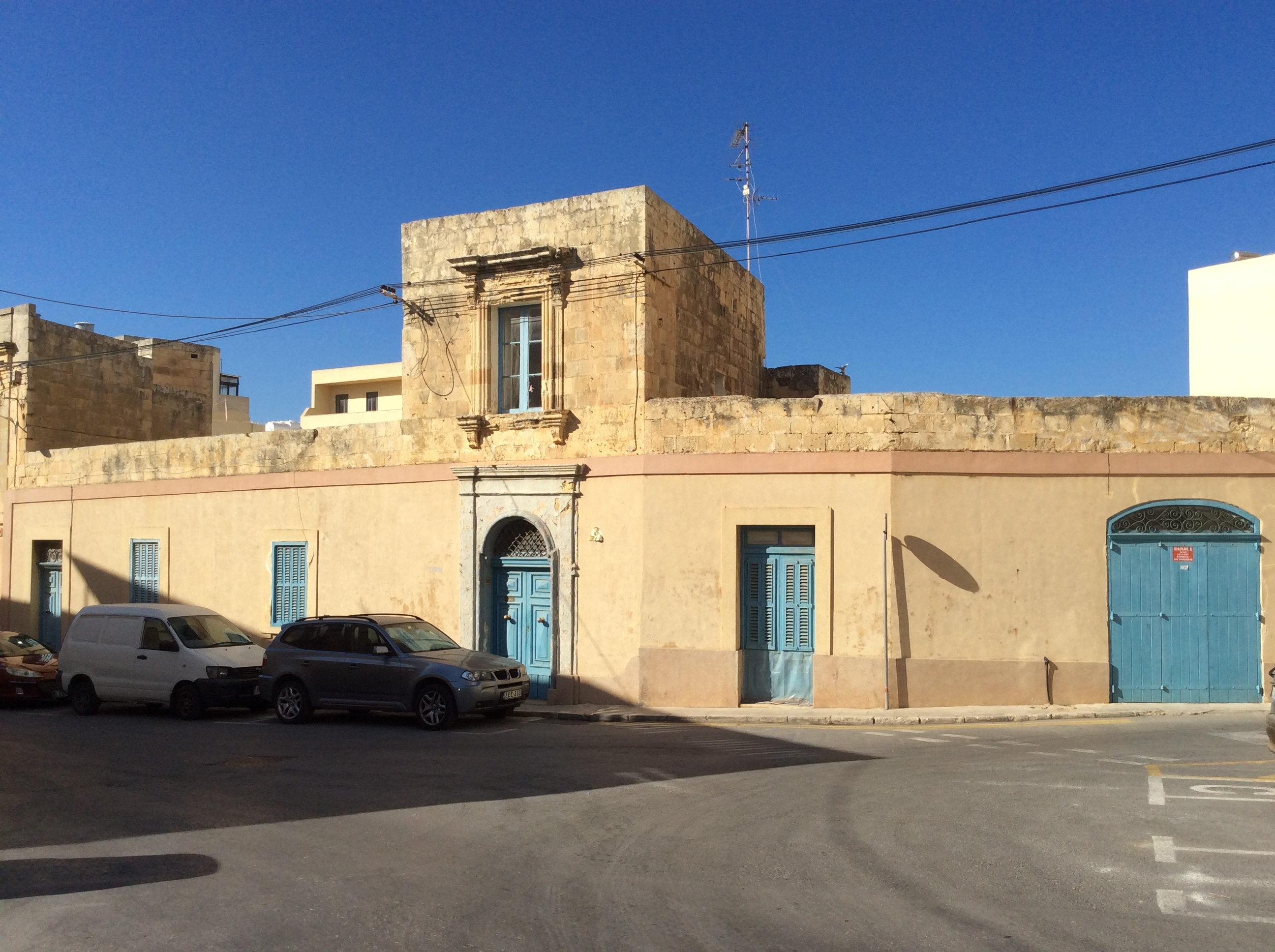
The house which probably belonged to the Tabone family

Tabone was given a house in Żejtun by his father in 1596. It is described in contemporary documents as consisting of rooms built around a courtyard, also containing a cistern, a small adjoining field and half of a tower (the other half of this tower seems to have belonged to the heirs of Tabone's uncle).

The house at 40, St. Clement's Street has traditionally been considered to be Tabone's house. It contains a courtyard, cistern and a nearby field, matching the description, and the date "1624" is reportedly inscribed inside the building. However, no sources which explicitly state that the building belonged to Tabone are known, and his ownership of the building is therefore uncertain.

The design of the house is similar to the auberges of the Knights in Birgu. It has a main door in the middle with an imposing window decorated with a local Melitan moulding. The building has other entrances and windows at ground floor but are simple. The upper floor is mostly not built. It is known as Casa Verdi.

=== Ingraw Tower ===
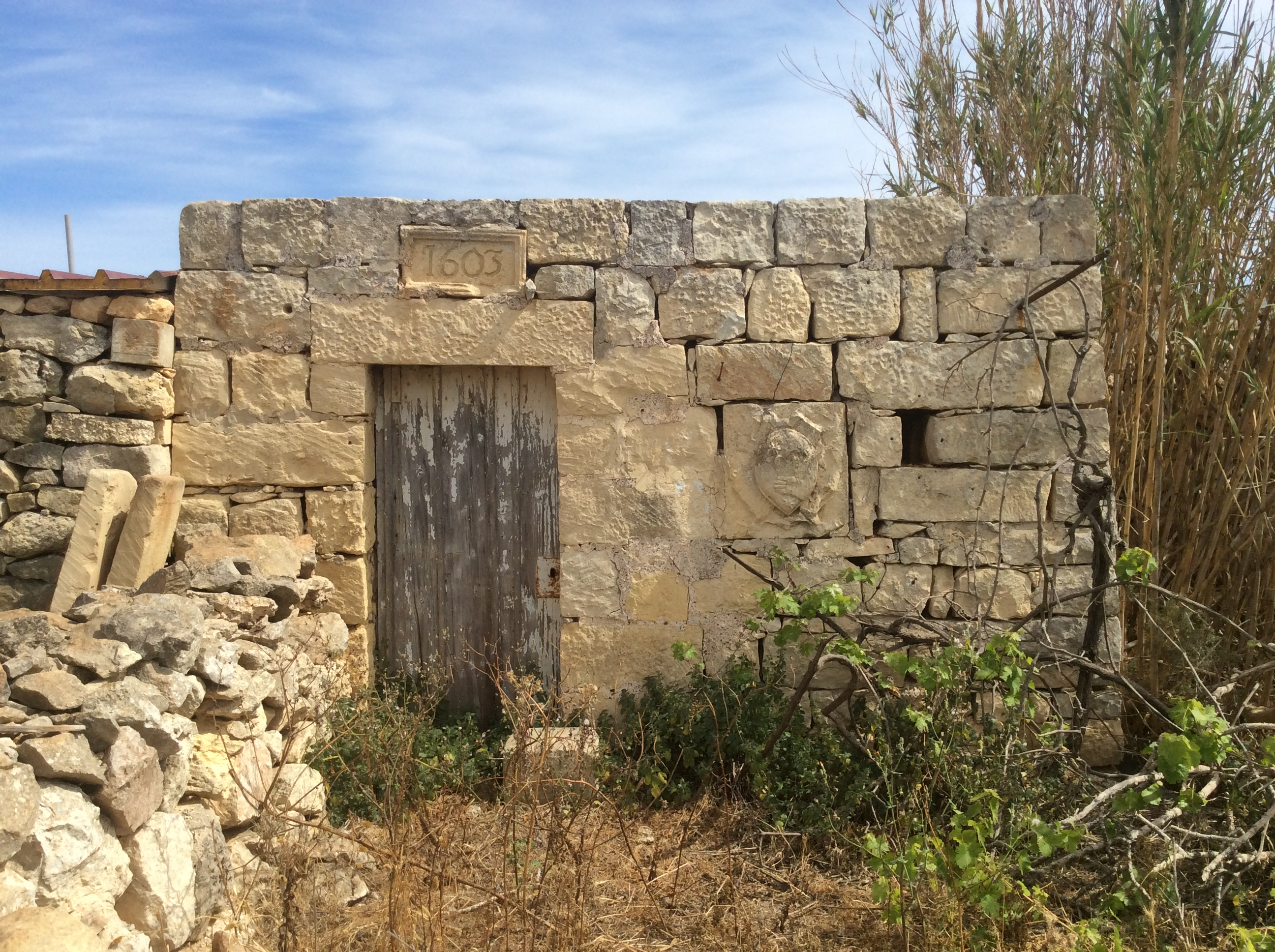
A rural structure built from reused stonework of the Ingraw Tower, with the date 1603 and the coat-of-arms of the Tabone family.

The Ingraw Tower (Maltese: Torri Ingraw) was built by Tabone in 1603 in Ħal Tmin or in the area of Misraħ Strejnu. It bore the following inscription, but it has been lost:

Clementis clementia non-par dicto gigantum – Taboniae stirpis Gloriæ honoræ domus
(meaning Clemente's clemency is said not to match that of giants – not even the glory of the Tabone's pedigree or the honour of the family)

The tower was built for defensive purposes since the area was prone to attacks by the Barbary pirates. A number of other towers were built in the area, including Tal-Mozz Tower in the immediate vicinity and Mamo Tower some distance away.

The Ingraw Tower had been dismantled by 1927, and its stonework was used to build a nearby rural structure. A stone bearing the date "1603" and another bearing the coat of arms of the Tabone family can still be seen in the room's façade.

=== St. Clement's Chapel ===
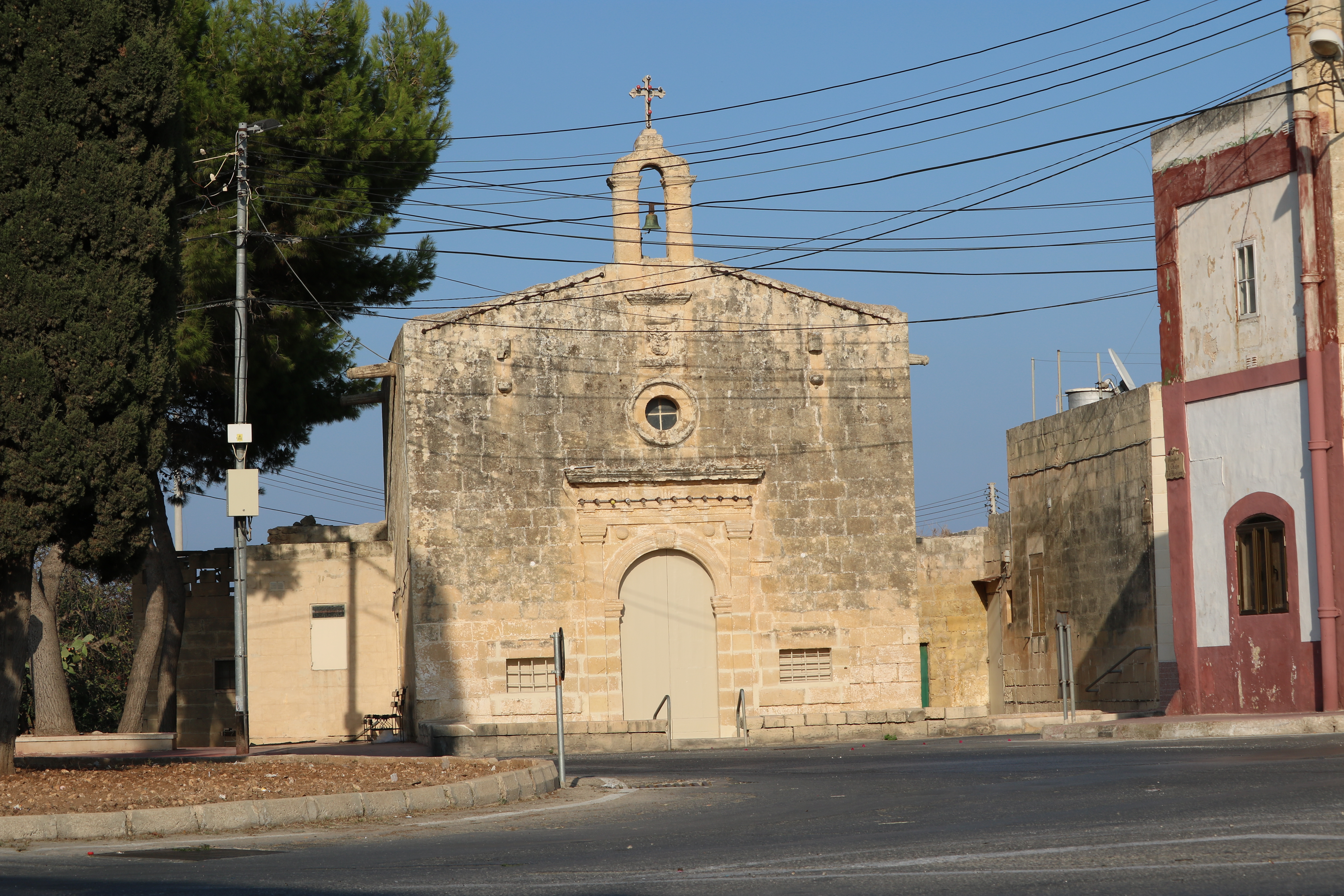
St. Clement's Chapel

Tabone had first made plans to construct a chapel in the 1620s, but when he described the wish to be buried in this chapel in his 1646 will, it is mentioned that the building was still to be constructed. Located in Ħal Tmin, the chapel is believed to have been built in 1658, since that date is inscribed on its façade beneath Tabone's coat of arms. It was described as complete in 1661. An inscription above the main doorway of the chapel reads:

Clementivs Taboni ecclesia[m] qua[m] ideo vovit, edificare fecit
(meaning Clemente Tabone promised a church as a vow, and because of this he built it)

It is often stated that the chapel was built to commemorate deliverance from the 1614 attack, but a definite link between the raid and the chapel has not yet been established. The church has a simple façade and a small parvis. Pope Clement I is the subject of the chapel's titular painting, which was painted in 1662 and is attributed to Stefano Erardi. The painting contains a depiction of an elderly Tabone. A small painting depicting the Pietà, attributed to Francesco Zahra, is also found in the chapel.

The chapel remains intact and it is still in use.
