= Alessio Erardi =

- Born: 1669; Hospitaller Malta
- Died: 1727 (aged 57–58); Hospitaller Malta
- Occupation: Painter
- Style: Baroque
- Parents: Stefano Erardi (father); Caterina Buttigieg (mother)
- Relatives: Pietro Erardi (uncle)

Alessio Erardi (1669–1727) was a Maltese painter. He was the son of the artist Stefano Erardi and his wife Caterina Buttigieg. He initially studied art with his father, and eventually spent five and a half years in Rome between 1695 and 1701. His style is regarded as an early form of Baroque, and he was influenced by both his father and Mattia Preti.

Selected works by Alessio Erardi include:

- Our Lady of Sorrows, Collegiate Church of Saint Lawrence, Vittoriosa
- Our Lady with St John the Baptist, Collegiate Church of the Immaculate Conception, Bormla
- Our Lady of the Holy Rosary (1702), Our Saviour's Church, Lija
- Count Roger (1713), St. Paul's Cathedral, Mdina
- Our Lady of the Rosary, Sanctuary of Our Lady of Mellieħa (attributed)
- Our Lady with the Child Jesus and Souls in Purgatory, Parish Church of the Assumption, Mosta
- Our Lady of Graces, Parish Church of Our Lady of Graces, Żabbar
- various paintings at the Church of Our Lady of Victories, Valletta
- various paintings at the oratory of the Church of the Jesuits, Valletta
- ceiling of the Oratory of the Blessed Sacrament, Basilica of St Dominic, Valletta
- ceiling of the Church of St. Ursola, Valletta
- Grand Master Raymond Perellos and Pope Clement XI, St John's Co-Cathedral, Valletta
