= Raid on Żejtun =

1614 Ottoman attack on Malta

- Part of the Spanish–Ottoman wars and Ottoman–Habsburg wars
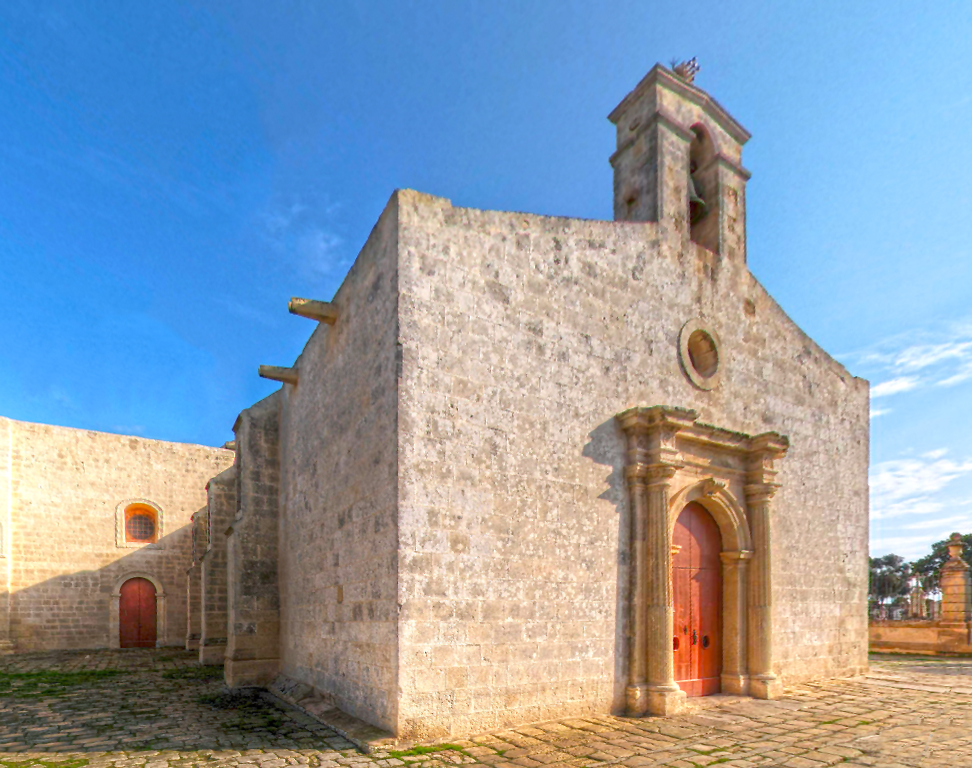
- Church of St. Gregory (then parish church of St. Catherine), which was sacked by the Ottomans
Date	6–7 July 1614 (2 days)
Location	South Eastern Malta (mainly Żejtun)
Result	Christian victory

Belligerents
Order of Saint John; Maltese civilians Spanish Empire	Ottoman Empire

Commanders and leaders
Malta: Alof de Wignacourt; Luís Mendes de Vasconcellos; Relief: Ottavio d'Aragona	Khalil Pasha

Strength
Malta: c. 6,000–8,000 men Relief: 26 galleys	5,000–6,000 men 52 galleys 8 vessels

Casualties and losses
Some killed c. 20 injured	Some killed c. 50–60 captured 1 galley sunk 1 galley captured

The Raid on Żejtun, also known as The Last Attack (Maltese: L-aħħar ħbit), was the last major attack made by the Ottoman Empire against Hospitaller-ruled Malta. The attack took place in July 1614, when raiders pillaged the town of Żejtun and the surrounding area before being beaten back to their ships by the Order's cavalry and by the inhabitants of the south-eastern towns and villages.

== Background ==
The Ottomans first attempted to take Malta in 1551, when they sacked Gozo, but were unable to take over the island. In 1565, they made a second attempt known as the Great Siege of Malta, but were repelled after four months of fighting. The Ottomans stayed away from Malta following the Battle of Lepanto in 1571, but began to make incursions to the central Mediterranean once again at the end of the century. In 1598, 40 Ottoman vessels were sighted off Capo Passero in Sicily, triggering a general alarm in Malta. Similar emergencies occurred in 1603 and 1610. This prompted the Order to prepare for an Ottoman attack. The obsolete Cittadella of Gozo was rebuilt, Valletta's water supply was secured by the building of the Wignacourt Aqueduct, and construction began on coastal watchtowers.

In 1614, reports of an Ottoman fleet sailing off towards either Malta or Sicily reached the Spanish Viceroy of Sicily, Pedro Téllez-Girón, Duke of Osuna. Without waiting for Spanish reinforcements, Osuna gathered 26 Sicilian, Maltese and Neapolitan galleys and sent them under the command of Ottavio d'Aragona in the hope to intercept the Turkish expedition. However, a storm forced d'Aragona to return to Sicily, allowing the Ottoman fleet arrive in Malta undisturbed.

== Attack ==
Two hours before dawn on 6 July 1614, a considerable Turkish force of sixty ships (including 52 galleys) under the command of Damat Halil Pasha tried to land in the bay at Marsaxlokk, but were repelled by artillery fire from the newly constructed Saint Lucian Tower. The fleet then laid anchor at St Thomas' Bay in Marsaskala, and managed to land 5,000 to 6,000 men unopposed.

The villagers retreated to the fortified towns of Vittoriosa and Senglea. The Turks did not manage to take them into slavery, but proceeded to sack and set fire to the surrounding towns and villages. The cannons of Valletta and Mdina sounded the alert, while Grand Master Alof de Wignacourt ordered all slaves to be imprisoned and all knights to move to their guardposts.

The Ottomans first sacked the Church of Our Lady of Graces in the nearby village of Żabbar, then part of the parish of Żejtun. Some of them went to attack St. Lucian Tower, while the rest of the force pillaged the village of Żejtun, which had been abandoned by its inhabitants after they heard about the attack. The Ottomans burnt the farms and fields of the area, and they also damaged the parish church of St Catherine. The attack is described in a commemorative plaque engraved close to the main altar of St Gregory's, which states that:

In the early hours of Sunday, July 6, 1614, a Turkish army landed from 60 galleys, disembarking six thousand men in the place called Ghizira in Saint Thomas' creek. The Turks raided the nearby casali, arriving right up to the farmlands held under the feud of Bulebel. They sacked these townships, burnt farmland and did much damage to the main church of Saint Catherine's and all the others. Many were caught and killed, and they were made to retire back to the quays. No Christian was captured, but twenty were injured in the attack. From that day until September 11, 1614, all those born in this parish had to be baptised elsewhere. Extracted from the second book of baptisms for this parish.

The Order sent a cavalry regiment to attack the invaders, under the command of the knight de Compremy, but they were almost defeated by the Ottoman raiders. The knights Castellan de Castellet Cornetta and Andrea Marconeral along with some 20 other knights and Maltese were wounded in this attack. Marconeral, who had shown courage in the attack, died of his wounds two days later, and de Compremy was also killed. Men from the Order's fleet under knight Luís Mendes de Vasconcellos were subsequently sent to repel the invaders. Meanwhile, a militia force of around 6000 to 8000 men was assembled and fought the Ottomans. A member of the Maltese militia, Clemente Tabone, was noted for the courage he showed during the attack.

A cannon shot from Khalil Pasha's galley announced the raiders' withdrawal back to their galleys. Several Ottoman raiders were killed in the fray, and around 50 to 60 of them were captured and enslaved. The Ottomans returned to their ships and after a failed attempt to make another landing at St. Paul's Bay, they sailed to Mellieħa to take on water and attacked the village and its sanctuary. The day after, Khalil Pasha finally ordered to set sail. Unknowingly, Ottavio d'Aragona had just arrived in Malta and disembarked reinforcements in the opposite side of the island. When d'Aragona learned about the Ottoman withdrawal, he chased them briefly, capturing a galley and sinking another before the rest retrated.

Khalil Pasha set sail for the Barbary Coast, going to Tripoli in Ottoman-ruled Tripolitania on a punitive expedition against a local insurgent. The fleet then suppressed a Greek uprising in the southern Peloponnese before returning to Constantinople in November 1614.

== Consequences ==
The attack confirmed the need of coastal watchtowers, and the construction of a tower defending St. Thomas Bay was approved on 11 July 1614. Following the attack, the Order added two transepts and a dome to the 15th-century parish church of Saint Catherine's. A narrow passage with two small windows looking at the towers of these forts was built high up in the thickness of the transept walls. The finding of human bones in a number of secret passages of this church was, for many years, linked with this attack.

In 1658, a member of the Żejtun dejma, Clemente Tabone built a chapel dedicated to St. Clement. It is often stated that this was done in commemoration of the deliverance from the attack, and it is believed to stand close to the location of a battle with the Turkish raiders. However, the exact link between the raid and the chapel is not proven by primary sources.

== Culture ==
Today the attack is remembered as a defining moment in the history of the town of Żejtun and Malta as it is the last major attack by the Ottomans on Malta. A play on the attack was written in 1996 by Trevor Żahra, a local playwright. One of the main roads into Żejtun, which passes close to the site of the battle with the Turks, was renamed Triq l-Aħħar Ħbit mit-Torok, in memory of the attack.

== Gallery ==
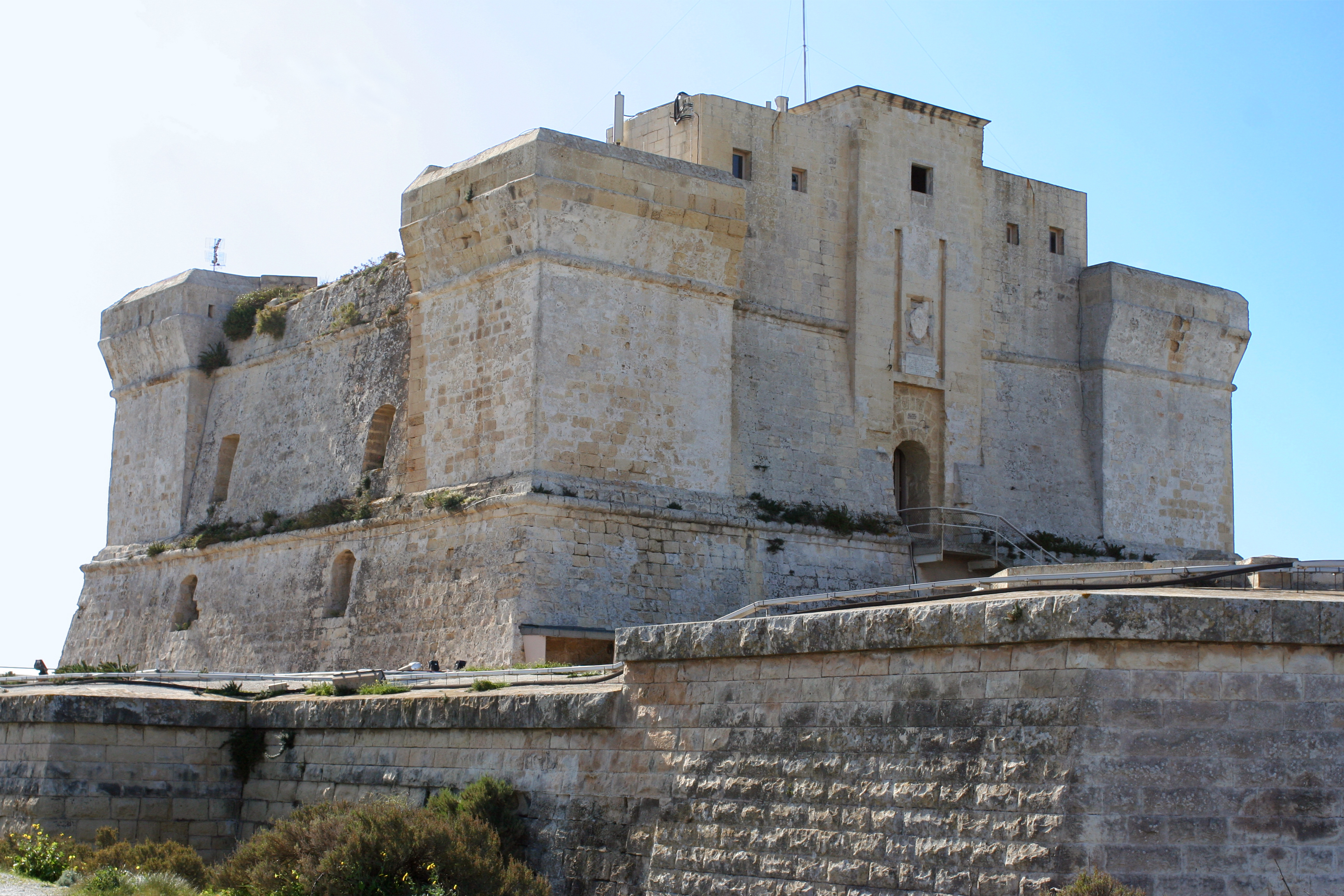
St. Lucian Tower, which prevented the Ottomans from landing at Marsaxlokk Bay

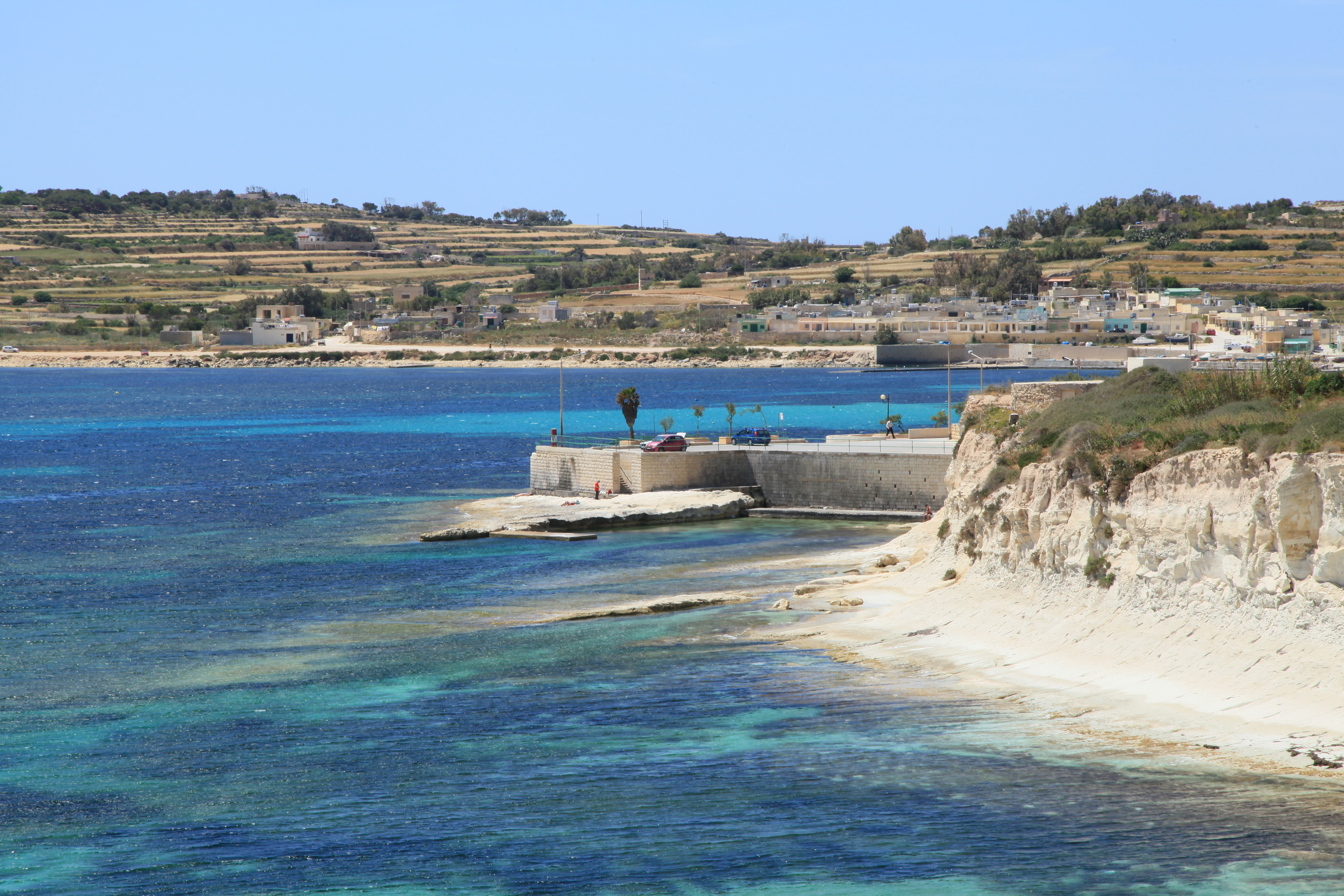
St. Thomas Bay, where the Ottomans landed

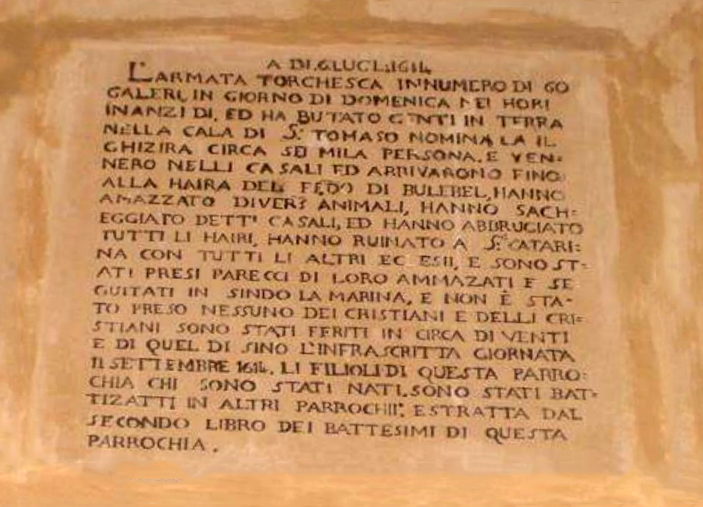
Commemorative plaque of the raid at St Gregory's church

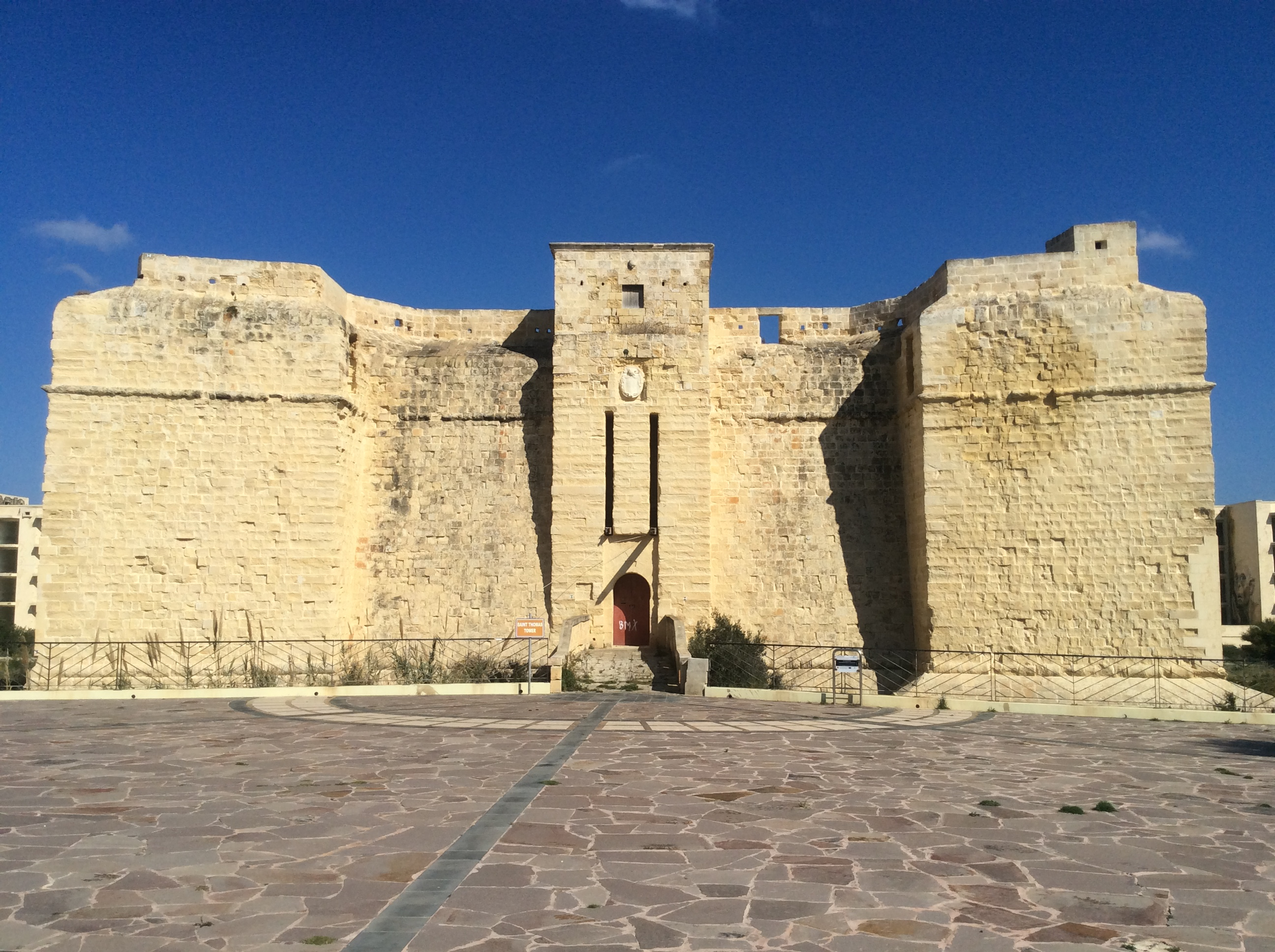
St. Thomas Tower, which was built soon after the attack to protect St. Thomas Bay

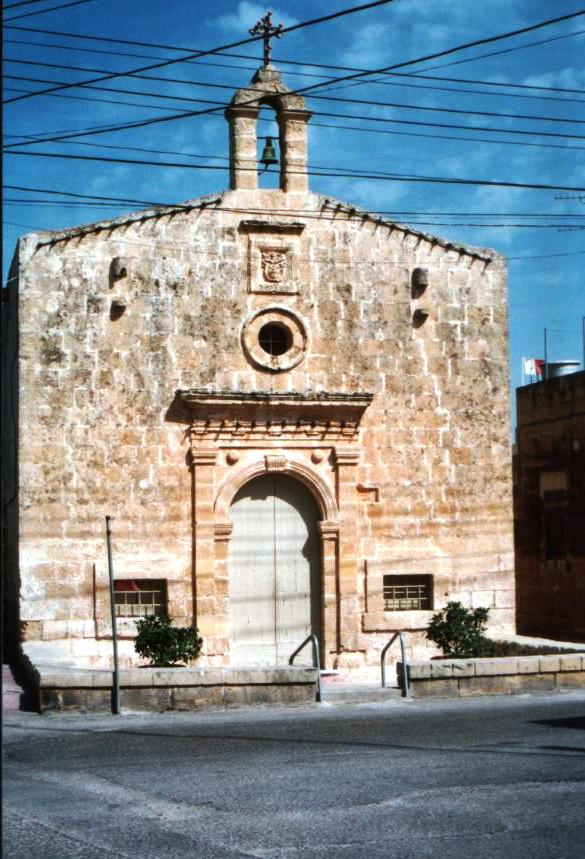
St Clement's Chapel, Żejtun, built in 1658 possibly to commemorate the deliverance from the attack
