= St Roque's Church, Valletta =

Church of St Roque
- Biserica Sfântul Rocco
- Knisja ta' San Rokku
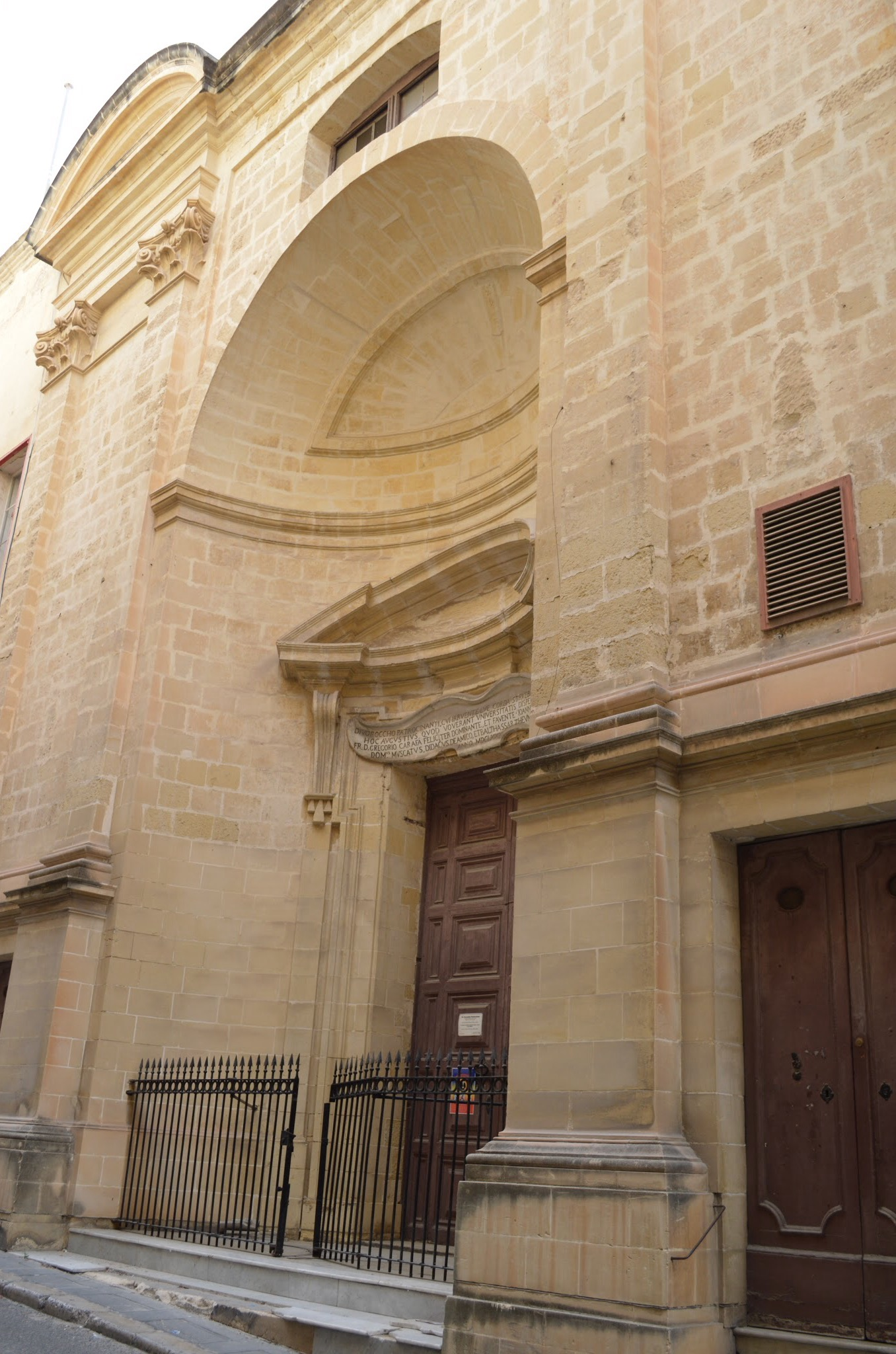

- Location within Malta
- 35°53′53.0″N 14°30′57.6″E
- Location: Valletta
- Country: Malta
- Denomination: Romanian Orthodox
- Previous denomination: Roman Catholic
- Website: Website

History
- Status: Active
- Dedication: Saint Roch

Architecture
- Functional status: Church
- Style: Baroque

Administration
- Metropolis: Western and Southern Europe
- Diocese: Italy
- Parish: Romanian Orthodox Parish of the Birth of John the Baptist

Clergy
- Archbishop: Iosif Pop
- Bishop: Siluan Span
- Priest: Popescu George Alexandru

The Church of St Roque (Maltese: Knisja ta' San Rokku, Romanian: Biserica Sfântul Rocco) is a 17th-century Baroque church located in Valletta, Malta. The church is the official parish church of the Romanian Orthodox Church in Malta and is subsequently used for Orthodox Divine services. The Romanian Orthodox parish is dedicated to the Birth of John the Baptist. The church still remains officially owned by the Roman Catholic Archdiocese of Malta.

== History ==
The church was built in fulfillment to a vow made during the plague of 1593. After the plague of 1676, another vow was made to enlarge the church. Work commenced in 1680 under supervision of Lorenzo Gafà. Expenses were partly met by the Gradmaster Gregorio Carafa, commemorated on an inscription above the door. The church was blessed by the vicar general Ludovico Famucelli on 12 August, 1681.

== Interior ==
The church has three altars, the high altar and two side ones. The titular painting depicts the Immaculate Conception with Saint Roch and Saint Angelo and the victims of the plague. It is the work of Stefano Erardi. Another painting by the same artist is that of Saint Stephen located above one of the side altars. The other side painting depicts the Holy Trinity and is the work if Polambi. Since Orthodox services commenced in the church, there were some changes to the decoration of the church to make it more compatible to Byzantine style worship.
