= Parish Church of the Nativity of the Virgin Mary, Mellieħa =

Parish Church of the Nativity of the Virgin Mary
- Knisja Parrokjali tat-Twelid tal-Vergni Marija
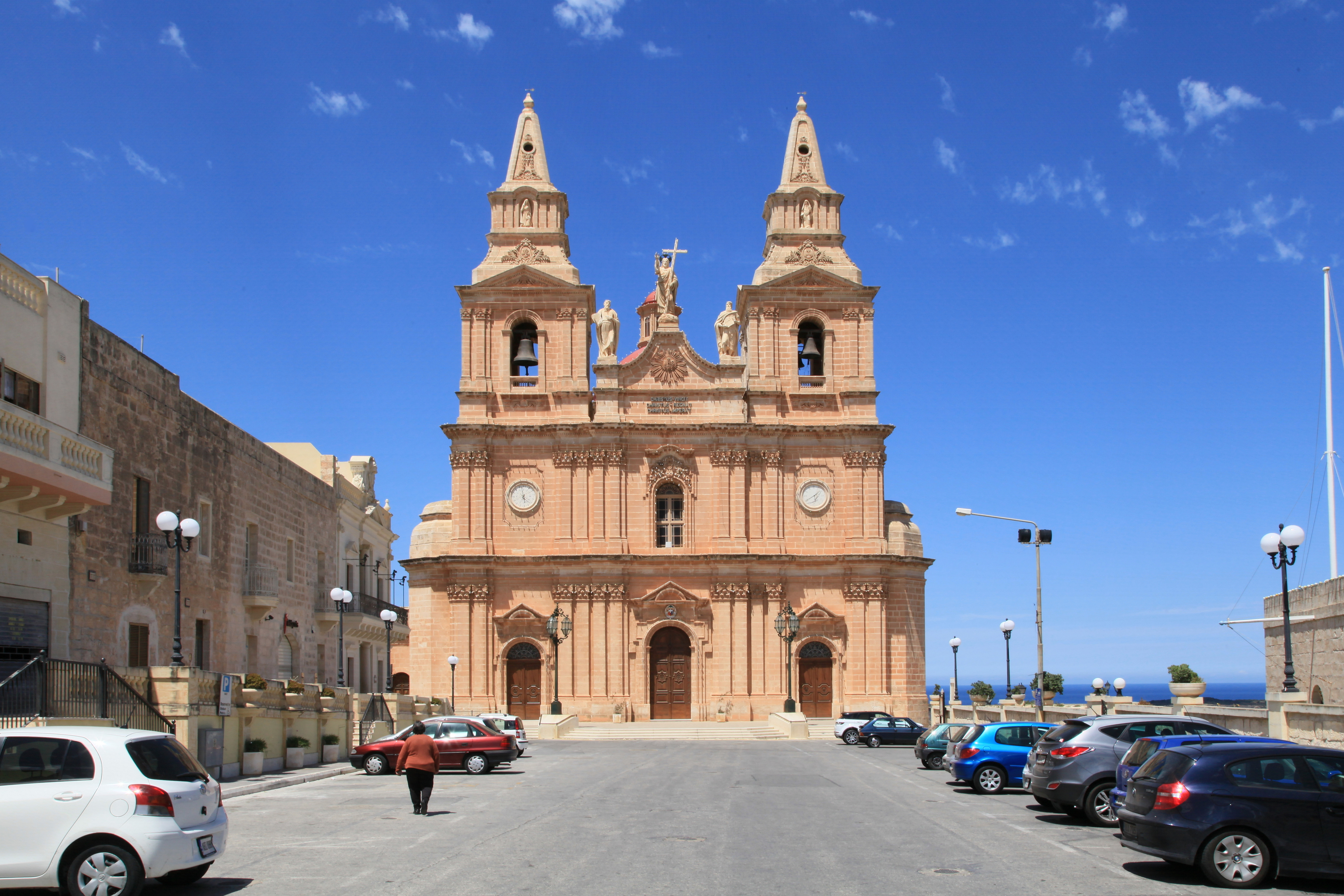
- The church's façade in 2014
- Parish Church of the Nativity of the Virgin Mary
- 35°57′39″N 14°21′39″E
- Location: Mellieħa, Malta
- Denomination: Roman Catholic

History
- Status: Parish church
- Dedication: Nativity of Mary
- Consecrated: 18 February 1930

Architecture
- Functional status: Active
- Style: Baroque
- Years built: 1881–1898; 1920–1940 (bell towers and dome)

Specifications
- Materials: Limestone

Administration
- Archdiocese: Malta

The Parish Church of the Nativity of the Virgin Mary (Maltese: Knisja Parrokjali tat-Twelid tal-Vergni Marija) is a Roman Catholic parish church in Mellieħa, Malta, dedicated to the Nativity of Mary. It was built between 1881 and 1898, and the dome and bell towers were completed between 1920 and 1940.

== History ==
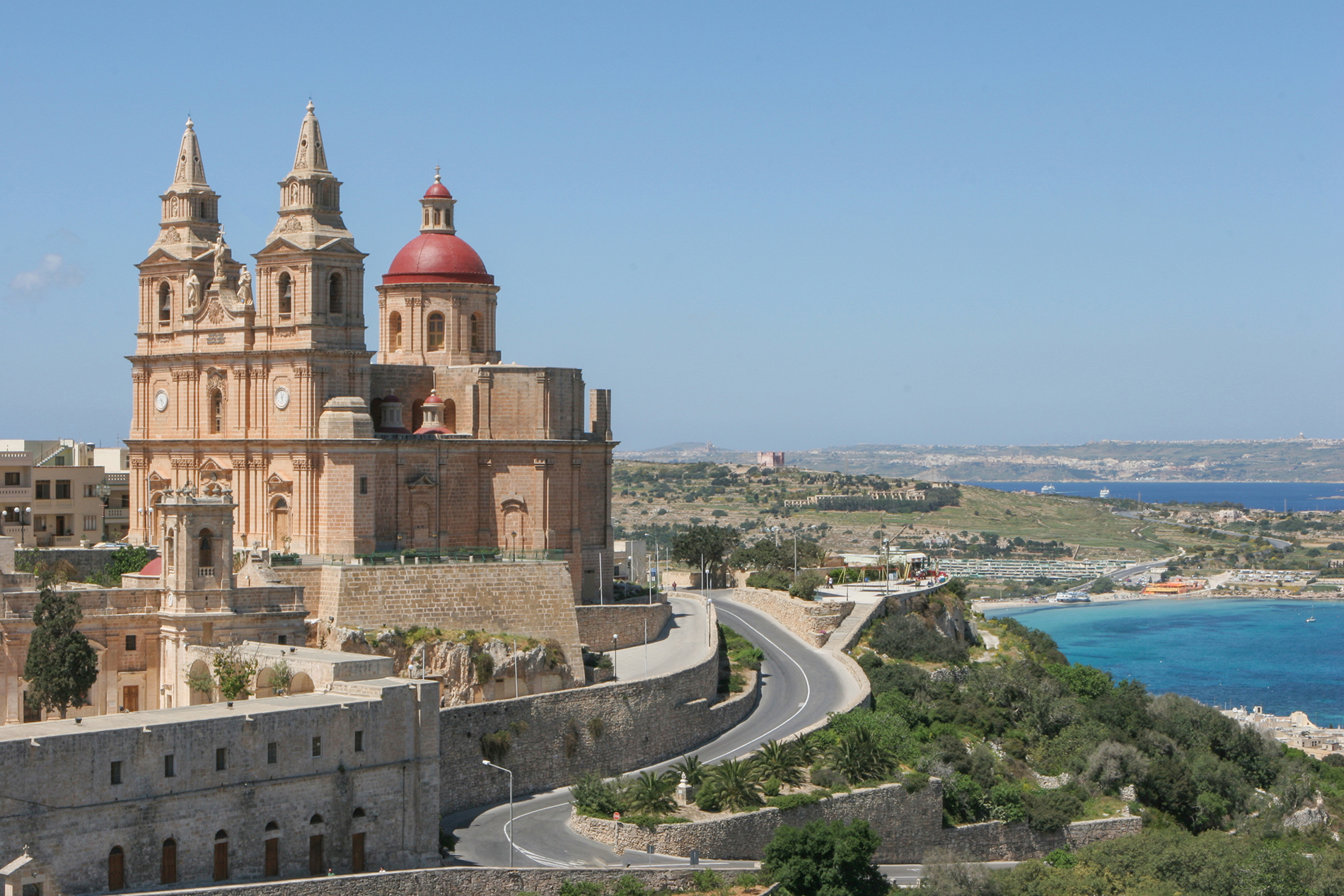
View of the church overlooking Mellieħa Bay, 2006

The parish of Mellieħa was first established in the 15th century or earlier, but in later centuries the village ceased to be a parish since the settlement was prone to attacks from the Barbary pirates and it was abandoned. The Sanctuary of Our Lady of Mellieħa remained an important shrine, and after the corsair threat had diminished the village began to grow once again. The parish was re-established in 1844.

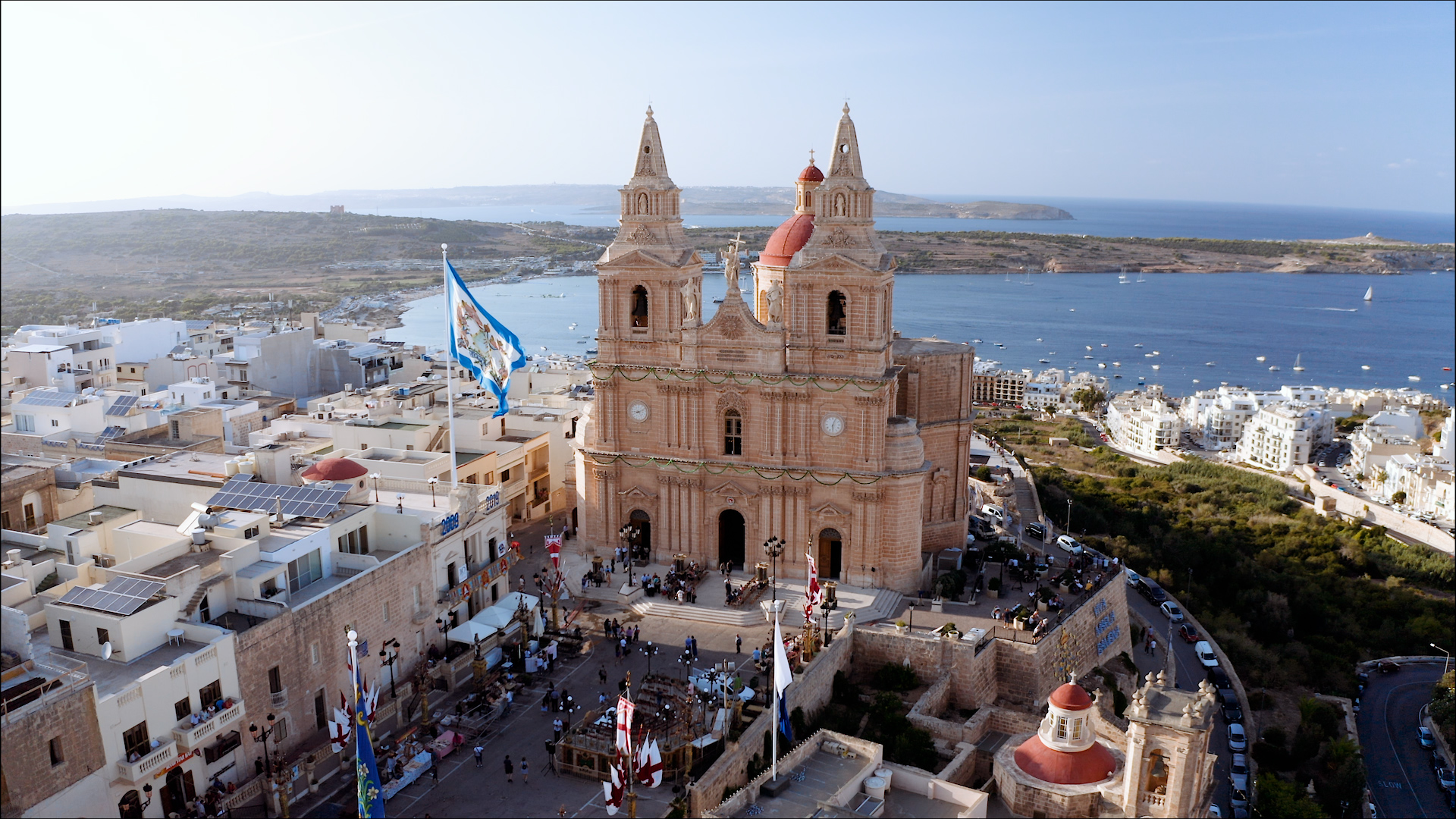
A drone view of the Parish Church of the Nativity of the Virgin Mary in Mellieħa in Malta

Construction of the parish church began in 1881, and the first stone was blessed by parish priest Francis Maria Magri on 5 September 1883. The limestone used to build the church was obtained from a quarry at l-Aħrax tal-Mellieħa, and the local population helped in transporting the building materials to the construction site. The church was blessed by Bishop Pietro Pace on 5 September 1897 and construction lasted until 1898.

Between 1920 and 1940, the church's bell towers and dome were completed, and five bells were purchased from Milan. The building was consecrated by Bishop Mauro Caruana on 18 February 1930. The interior was embellished with a number of paintings, including works by the Maltese painters Giuseppe Calì and Lazzaro Pisani.

== Architecture ==
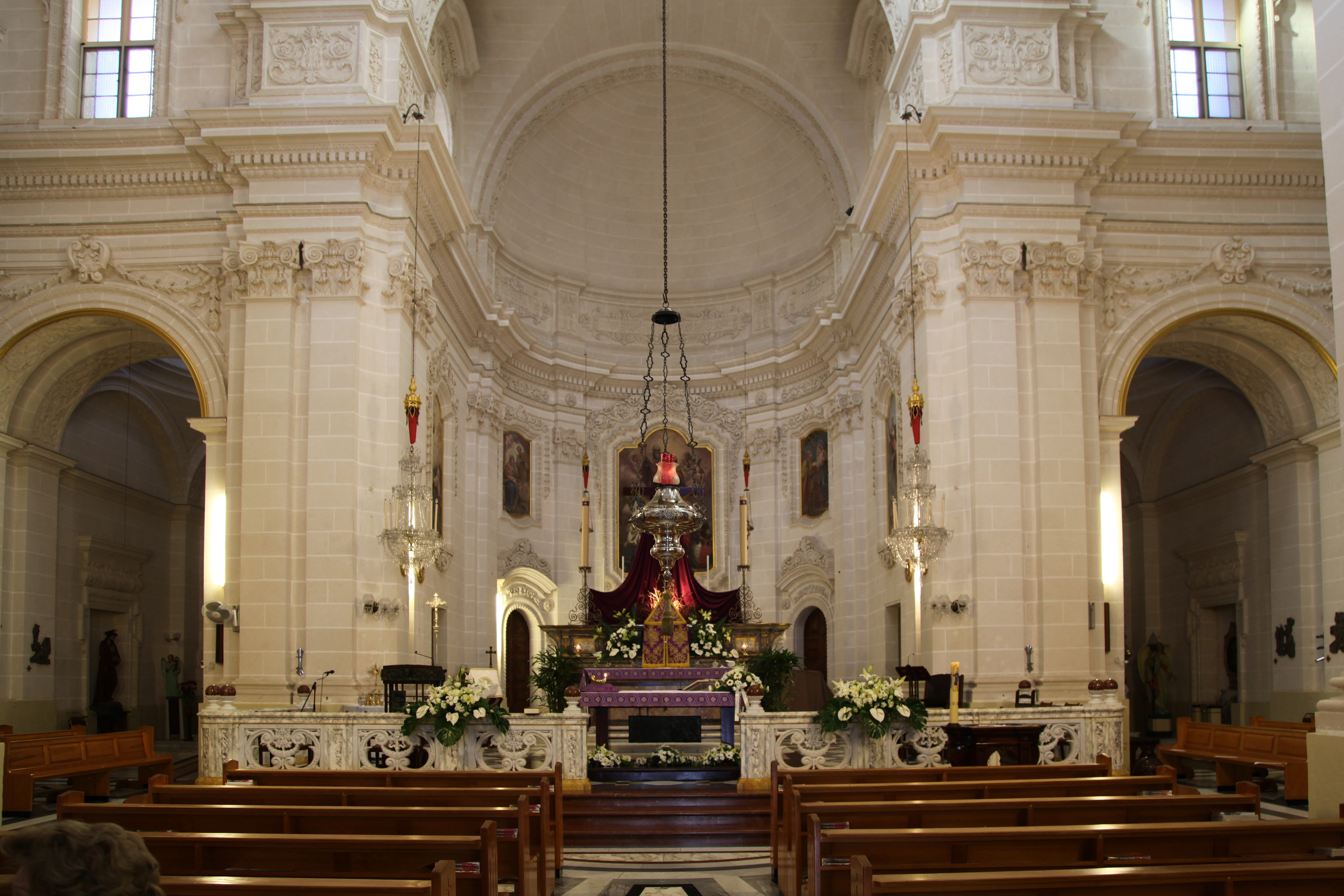
The church interior in 2013

The church has two bell towers and a dome which make it a prominent landmark in the Mellieħa skyline. It has Baroque features, and its architecture has been described as "pretty dull".
