= St Clement's Chapel, Żejtun =

St Clement's Chapel
- Kappella ta' San Klement
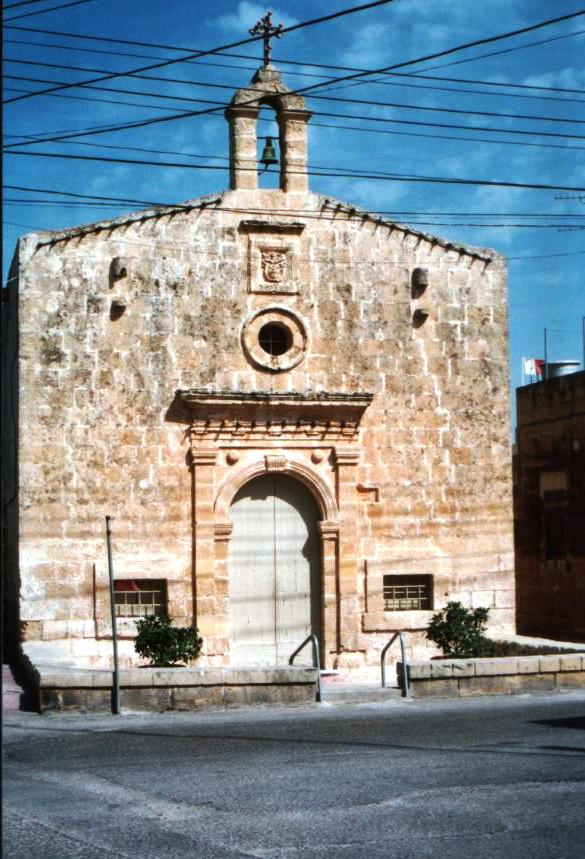

- Location within Malta
- 35°51′37.4″N 14°31′56.6″E
- Location: Żejtun
- Country: Malta
- Denomination: Roman Catholic

History
- Status: Active
- Founded: 1658
- Founder: Clemente Tabone
- Dedication: Pope Clement I

Architecture
- Functional status: Church

Administration
- Archdiocese: Malta

St Clement's Chapel is a 17th-century Roman Catholic church in Żejtun, Malta.

== History ==
This chapel was built as a thanksgiving for a vow of a certain village local. Clemente Tabone had vowed that should his life be spared from the invading piracy headed by the Turkish army who constantly attacked Malta during the 17th century, he would build a chapel in honor of St Clement to whom he prayed. The chapel was built in 1658. Tabone was also responsible for equipping the chapel with all items needed to celebrate services and for the celebration of the feast of St Clement every 23 November with vespers and mass. Tabone was also responsible for lighting the oil lamp in the chapel in commemoration of his late wife Dorothy Cumbo and for the celebration of two masses every week.

== Interior ==
The titular painting, the work of Stefano Erardi, depicts its founder Clemente Tabone, whose head and prayerful hands can be spotted in the bottom left corner. The painting depicts Pope Clement I, the Blessed Virgin and the child Jesus with several angles. The painting dates from 1662. Another notable painting, by Francesco Zahra, depicts the Pietà.
