= Pietro Erardi =

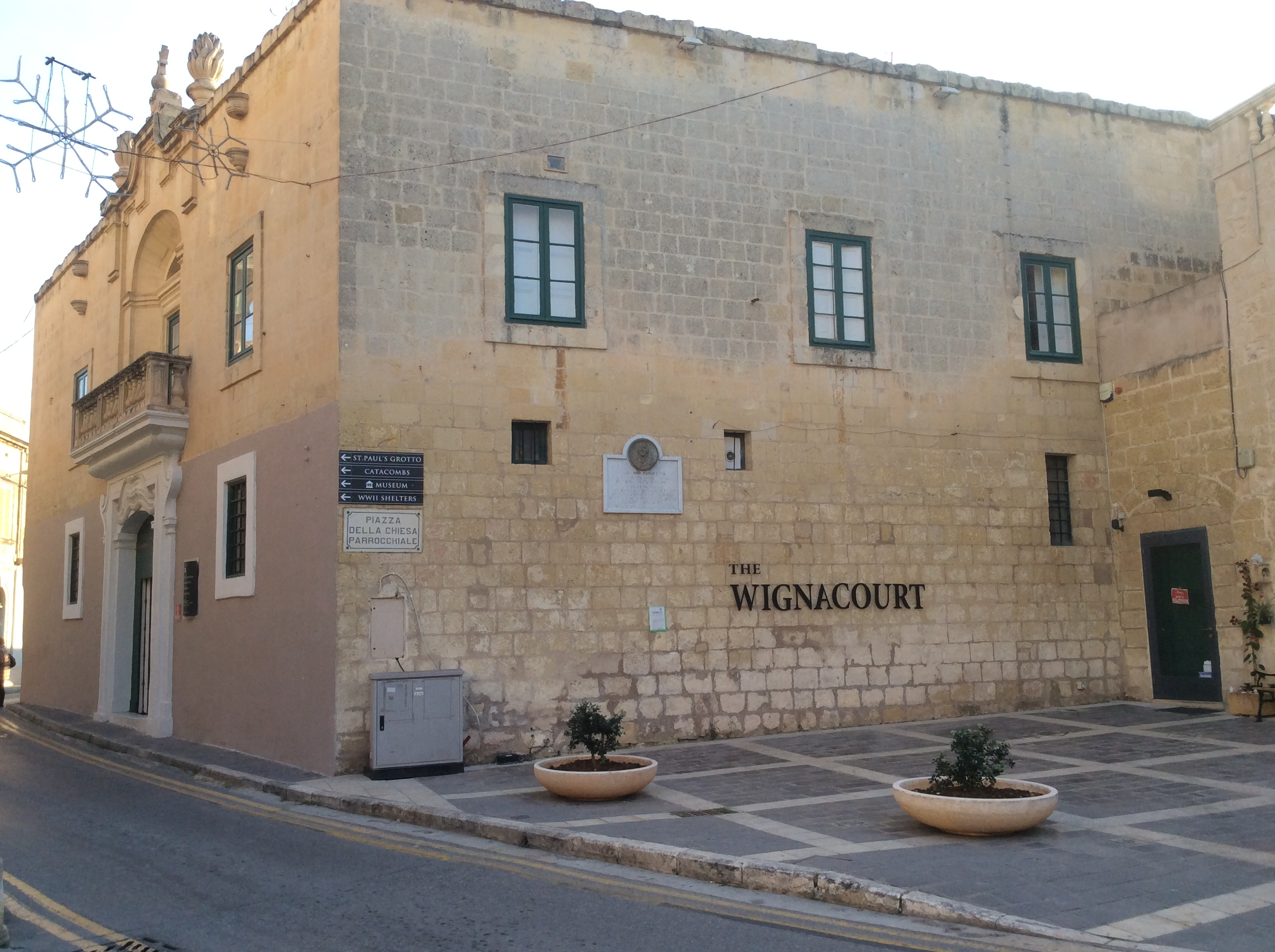
Erardi spent most of his life as a chaplain in this college in Rabat, today the Wignacourt Museum

Fra Pietro Erardi (1644–1727) was a Maltese chaplain and painter. He was a cleric and became a chaplain of obedience of the Order of St. John in 1669, and joined the Wignacourt College in Rabat in 1683 and remained there until his death.

Erardi came from a family of painters, being the brother of Stefano Erardi and the uncle of Alessio Erardi, and he owned a significant collection of artworks. He was himself a minor artist, and he painted a large work depicting St. Paul's Shipwreck for the parish church dedicated to that saint in Rabat. He donated some of his works to the Wignacourt College.
