= Sanctuary of Our Lady of Mellieħa =

- Santwarju tal-Madonna tal-Mellieħa
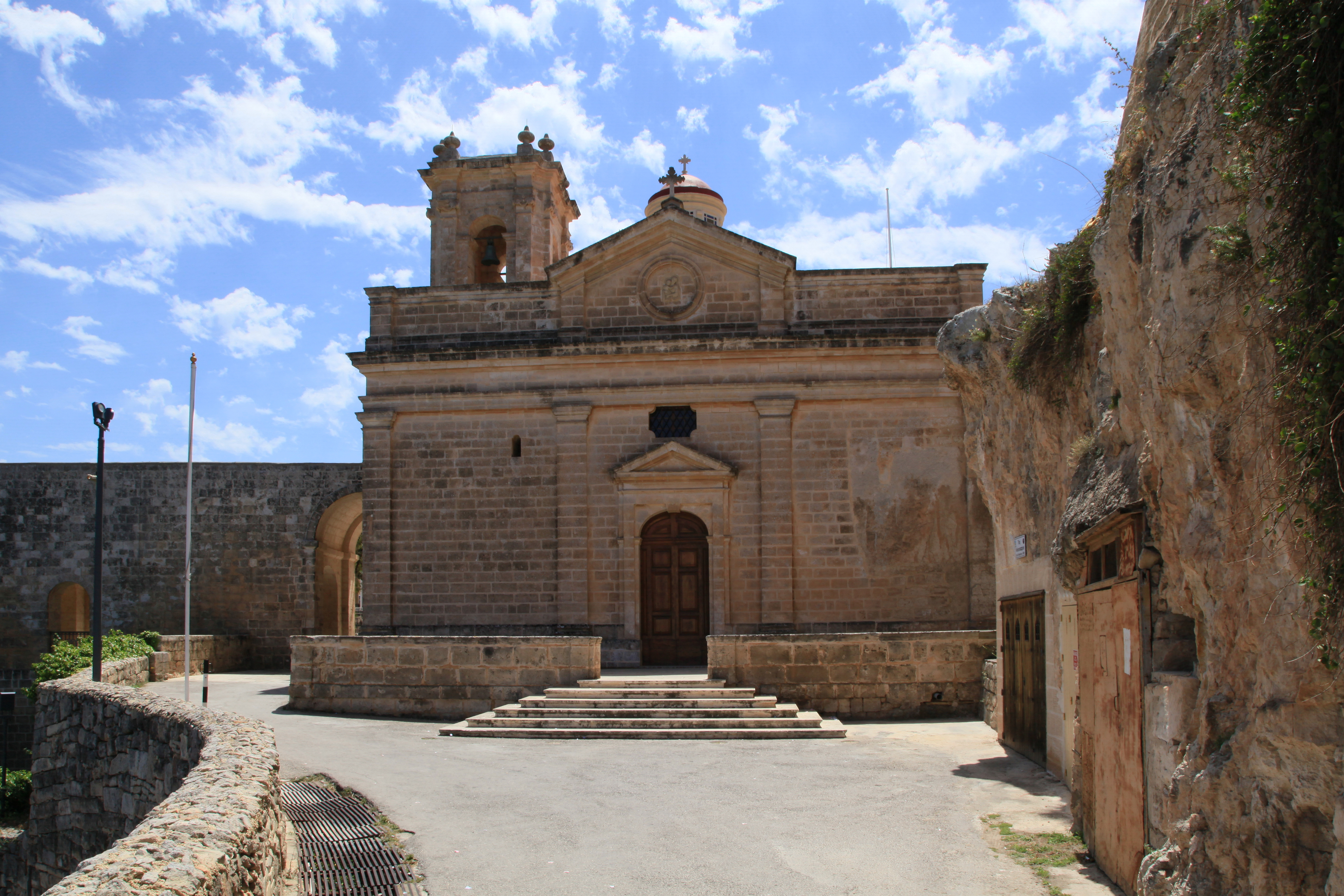
- The sanctuary's façade in 2014
- Sanctuary of Our Lady of Mellieħa
- 35°57′37.44″N 14°21′40.68″E
- Location: Mellieħa, Malta
- Denomination: Roman Catholic

History
- Status: Church
- Dedication: Nativity of Mary
- Consecrated: 21 May 1747 (reconsecration, date of original consecration unknown)

Architecture
- Functional status: Active
- Years built: 16th–18th centuries

Specifications
- Materials: Limestone

Administration
- Archdiocese: Malta
- Parish: Mellieħa (15th–16th centuries and since 1844); Naxxar (16th century–1844)

The Sanctuary of Our Lady of Mellieħa (Maltese: Santwarju tal-Madonna tal-Mellieħa) is a Roman Catholic church in the village of Mellieħa in Malta. The sanctuary originated as a natural cave which was consecrated as a church at an unknown date, and local traditions link its establishment to antiquity or the medieval period. The church's altarpiece is a Byzantine-style fresco which is believed to date back to the late 12th or early 13th centuries, and it is said to be miraculous.

It became a parish church by the early 15th century, and although it was later absorbed into another parish the church retained its importance as a pilgrimage site in subsequent centuries. The present building was constructed in various stages between the late 16th and 18th centuries, incorporating parts of the natural cave in which the church originated. A number of notable people visited the sanctuary over the centuries, including several kings and viceroys of Sicily, some Hospitaller Grand Masters and Pope John Paul II.

== History ==
The Sanctuary of Our Lady of Mellieħa is the oldest Marian shrine in Malta, and it is built on the site of a cave which is traditionally linked to the establishment of Christianity in Malta. According to tradition, the cave was originally a place of worship for the nymph Calypso, but it became a Christian site after St Paul's shipwreck on Malta in 60 AD. St Luke, who accompanied St Paul, is said to have painted a fresco depicting the Virgin Mary on the cave's rock face. Some state that the cave was consecrated as a church by St Paul himself or by St Publius.

Other traditions state that the cave was consecrated as a church in 402 AD by some bishops who were on their way to a church council (possibly at Milevum), in 540 AD by bishops accompanying the Byzantine general Belisarius during a stop in Malta or in 1091 by bishops accompanying the Norman Count Roger I during his invasion of Malta. The actual date of consecration as a church remains unknown, but it is recorded that the consecration was commemorated by a Greek inscription and seven crosses. The former still existed in 1540 but it has since been lost, while the crosses were embellished in 1620 and they survive today.

In the 14th and 15th centuries the church was visited by various notable people, including the Kings of Sicily Frederick III in 1373, Martin I in 1408 and Alfonso in 1432, and Viceroys of Sicily Lope Ximénez de Urrea y de Bardaixi in 1468 and Fernando de Acuña y de Herrera in 1490. The church was recognised as one of Malta's original ten parish churches, being mentioned in a 1436 document by Bishop Senatore de Mello. In 1470, a pilgrimage to the church took place after Malta had suffered from three years of drought.

In the 16th century, the village of Mellieħa was depopulated due to raids by Barbary pirates, especially after a major attack in 1551. The church therefore ceased to be an independent parish and it was absorbed into that of Naxxar. During the Great Siege of Malta in 1565, the church was reportedly visited by Don García de Toledo, the leader of the relief force which ended the siege. The sanctuary's dedication was subsequently changed from the maternity of Mary to the Nativity of Mary.

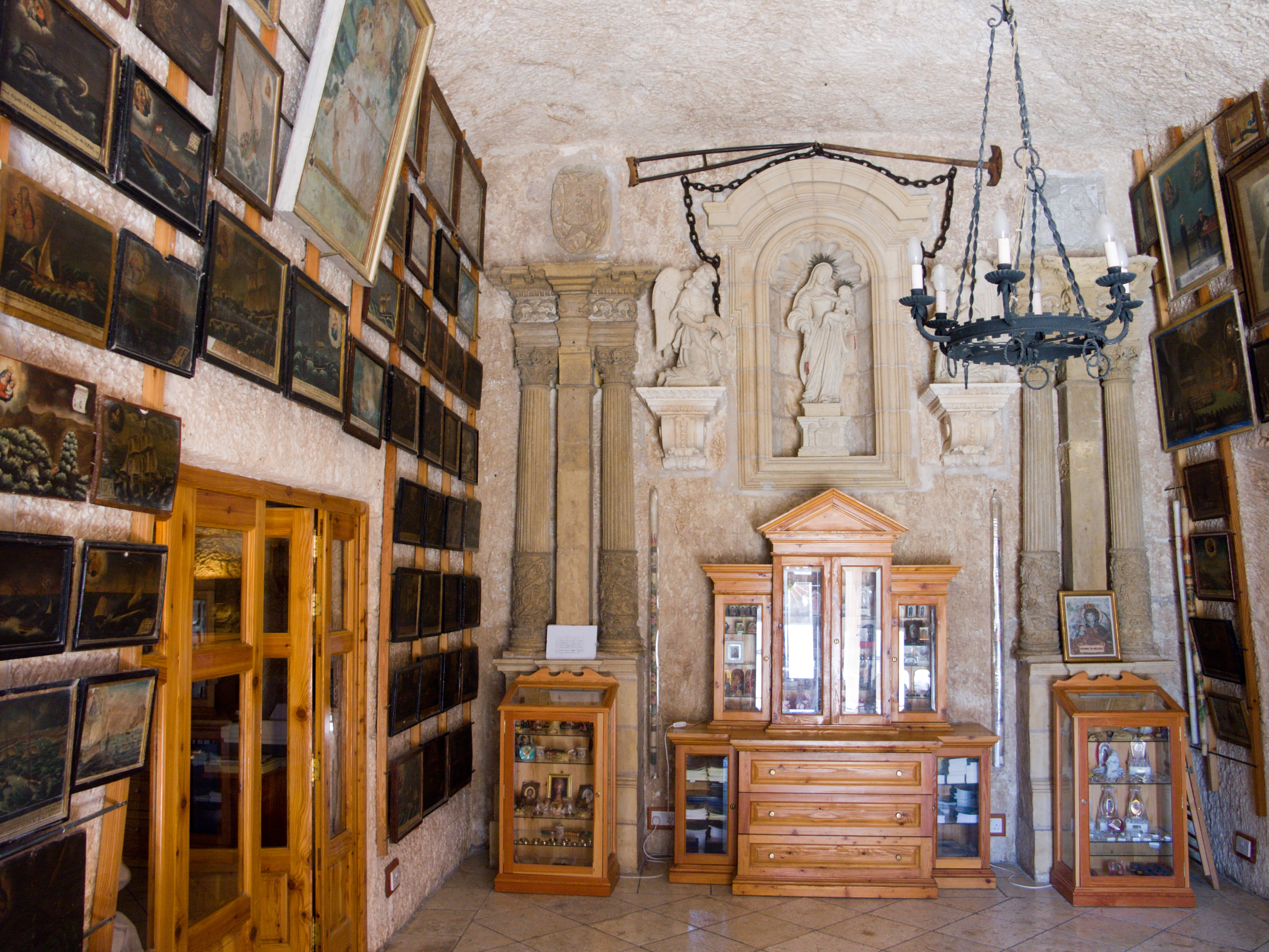
The sanctuary's sacristy, with ex-voto paintings on the walls

In 1584, the Augustinian friar Aurelio Axiak was granted permission to take charge of the sanctuary, and a convent was established. Three years later the sanctuary was entrusted to the priest Bennard Cassar, who became its rector in 1603. In July 1614 the church was sacked during an Ottoman attack, and the main fresco and some statues were damaged. Bishop Miguel Juan Balaguer Camarasa reported that a Turk who had damaged the fresco with a knife later became sick but was miraculously healed after praying for forgiveness, and he sent candles to the sanctuary as a form of gratitude. Grand Master Alof de Wignacourt is said to have visited the church on a regular basis after the attack, and devotion to the sanctuary subsequently increased.

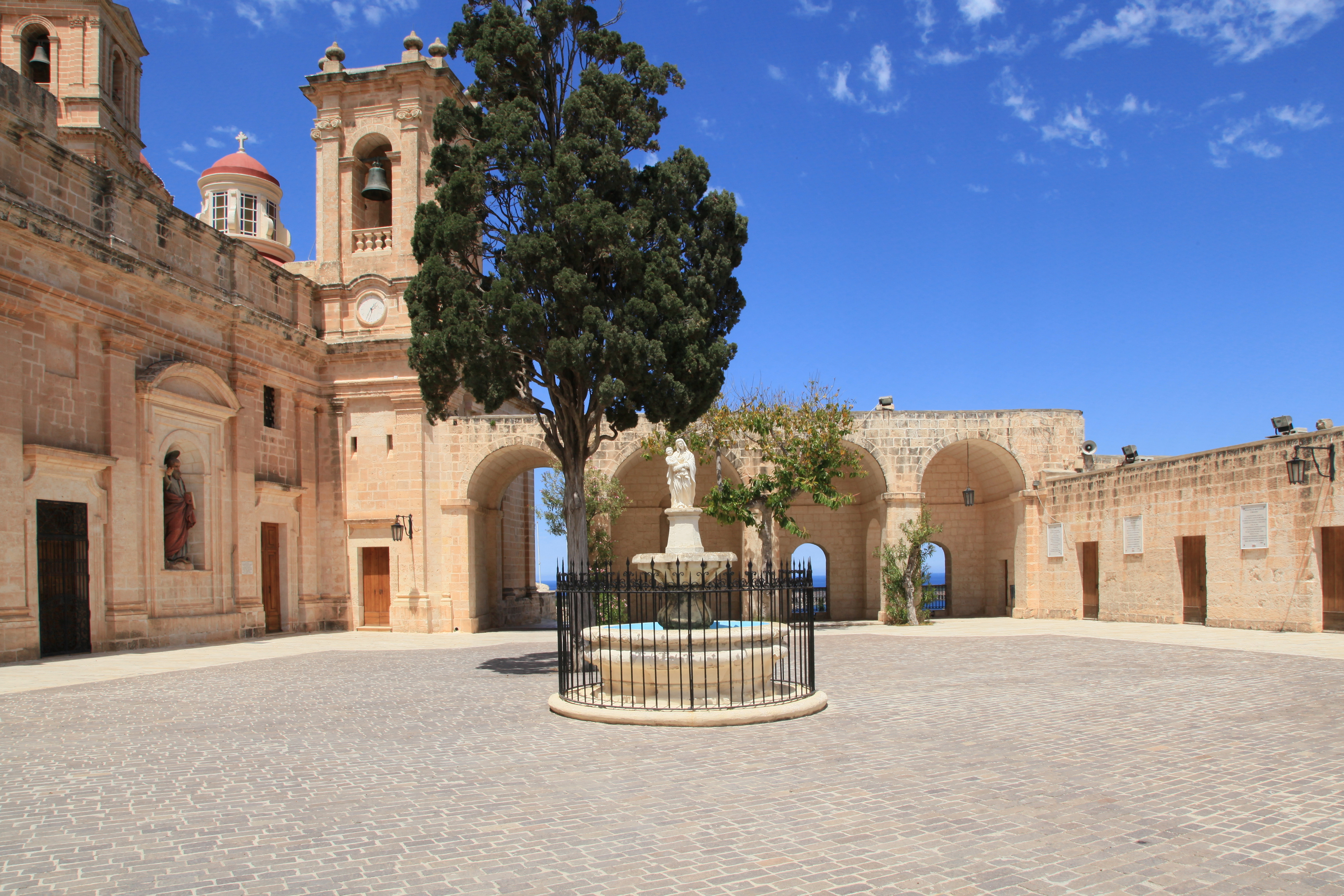
The courtyard which leads to the sanctuary

In 1644, the Sicilian wine merchant Mario De Vasi enlarged and embellished the church, and he paid for the establishment of a rock-hewn crypt known as Il-Madonna tal-Għar (or Il-Madonna tal-Grotta) nearby. A Confraternity of the Rosary was established within the church in 1669. Grand Master Ramón Perellós is said to have visited the sanctuary after recovering from an illness, and in 1718 a pilgrimage to the sanctuary took place amidst a drought. The sanctuary was enlarged once again in 1747, and on 21 May of that year the building was reconsecrated by Bishop Paul Alphéran de Bussan.

Residents of Valletta held a pilgrimage to the sanctuary after the end of a plague epidemic in 1813. Mellieħa was reestablished as a parish in 1844, and a new parish church dedicated to the Nativity of Mary was built close to the sanctuary in the late 19th century. A pilgrimage to the sanctuary was made during a cholera epidemic in 1888, and another national pilgrimage was organised in 1949. Pope John Paul II visited the sanctuary and blessed it on 26 May 1990 during his visit to Malta. Restoration works were carried out between 1999 and 2000.

The Maltese Episcopal Conference recognised the sanctuary as the National Shrine of Our Lady in Malta in May 2015.

== Architecture ==
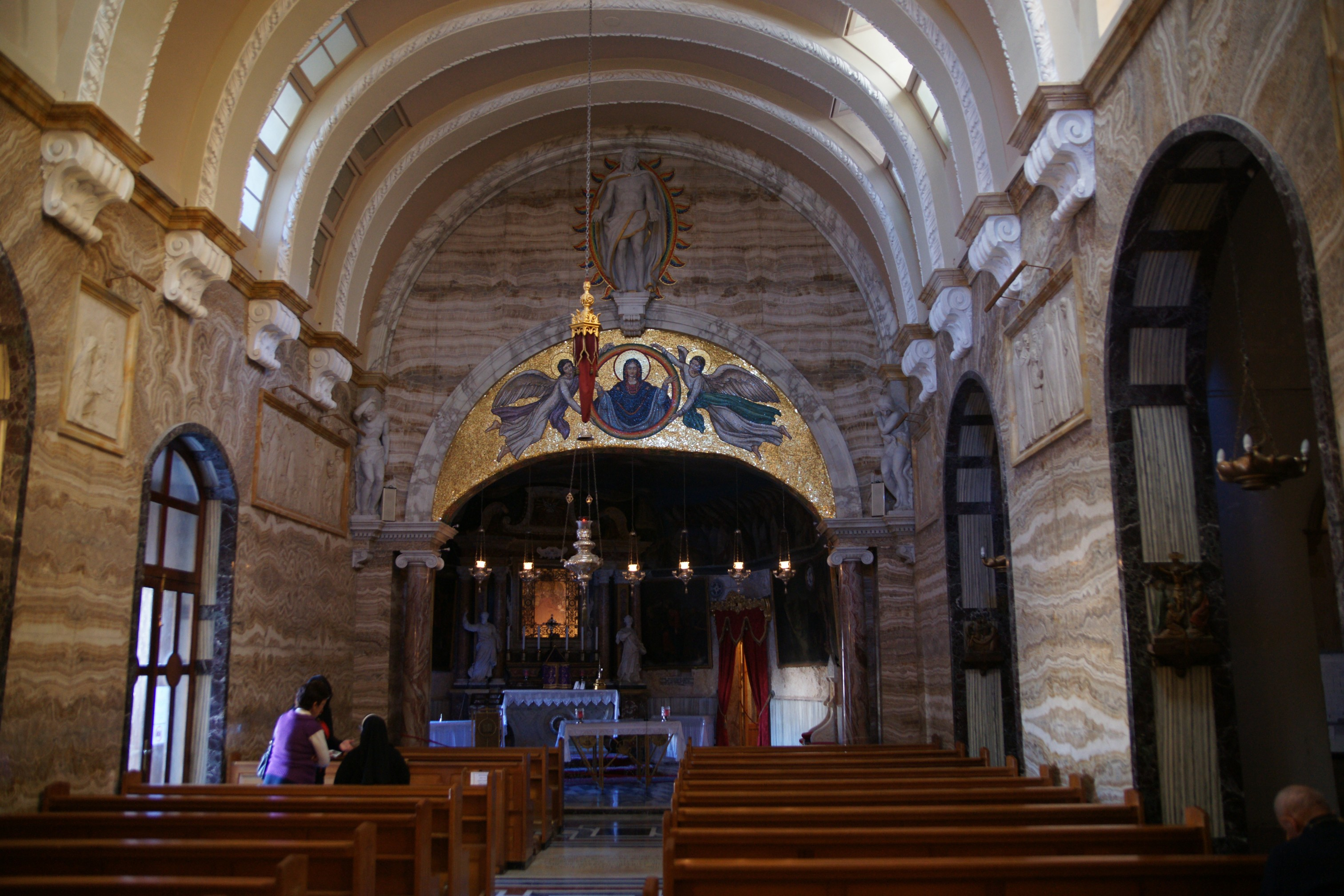
The sanctuary's interior

The sanctuary as it stands today was largely constructed in various stages between the late 16th and mid-18th centuries. The entrance to the sanctuary complex is through a Baroque monumental archway which bears the date 1719 and which contains an inscription in Latin and archaic Maltese. This leads to a courtyard which includes loggias where pilgrims could rest, along with a statue of the Virgin Mary and a niche of St Paul.

Access to the sanctuary is through an archway under the loggias. The site had originated as a natural cave which was later extended, and parts of the sanctuary are built of masonry while others are excavated from the natural rock. The main entrance leads to a sacristy, which allows access to a tunnel lined with ex-voto offerings and a rock-hewn crypt which was excavated in the 16th century. The tunnel leads to the church itself, which has walls decorated with marble. The altar is part of the cave, with marble columns added around the altarpiece.

The church contains a small dome and a single bell tower which contains three bells which date back to 1712, 1733 and 1857. The clock on the bell tower was made by Michelangelo Sapiano in 1875, and it was paid for by the British government.

== Artworks and relics ==
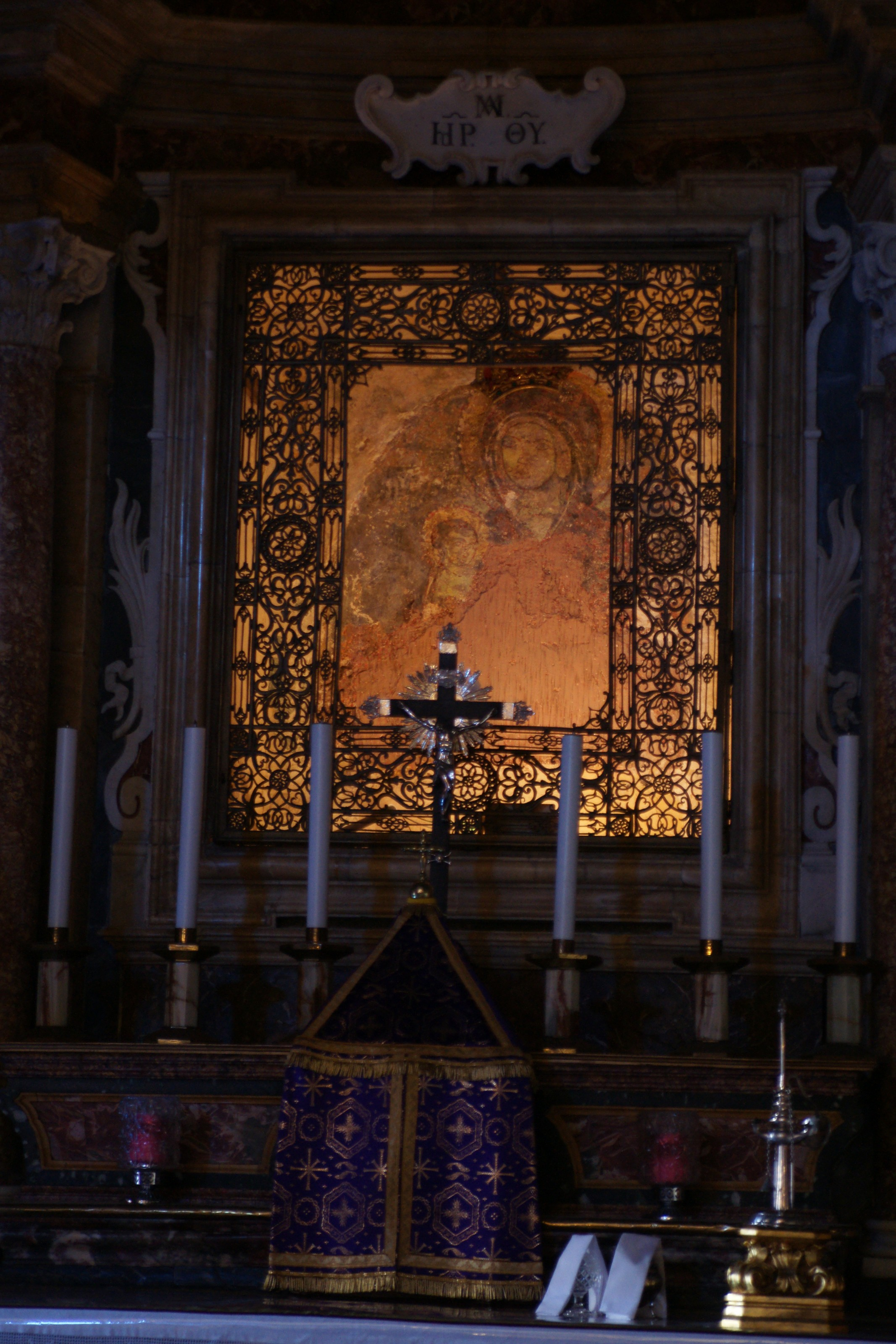
The medieval fresco of Our Lady of Mellieħa

The sanctuary's altarpiece is a fresco which depicts the Virgin Mary with Jesus on her right arm. Tradition attributes this painting to St Luke, but this claim is unsubstantiated. The artwork is believed to actually date back to around the late 12th or early 13th centuries, and its style is inspired from Byzantine art with Sicilian influences and a vernacular quality. It is one of the oldest existing works of art in Malta from the late medieval period. The painting was in a poor state of preservation by 1587, and at that point it was overpainted with a new painting. The depiction of the Virgin Mary is said to be miraculous, and it was crowned by Bishop of Malta Pietro Pace, Bishop of Gozo Giovanni Maria Camilleri and auxiliary bishop Savatore Gaffiero on 24 September 1899, after Pope Leo XIII had issued a decree which allowed this on 29 May 1895. In 1972, restorer Samuel Bugeja removed the 16th century overpainting and revealed the medieval artwork. A copy by Giuseppe Calì of the 16th century version still exists in the sanctuary's sacristy. The fresco was restored once again between 2012 and 2016.

The roof of the cave around the altarpiece contains paintings by Salvu Bonnici. These were restored in 1886 by Ċensu Busuttil and in 1973 by Samuel Bugeja. The church contains a number of other artworks by Giuseppe Calleja, Anton Falzon, Pietru Pawl Caruana and possibly Stefano Erardi, along with some paintings made by unknown artists.

The sacristy and a tunnel leading to the church contain many ex-voto paintings and other offerings. A notable example is a painting depicting a Venetian ship and an icon of the Virgin Mary and Jesus which might have originated from the Kykkos Monastery in Cyprus. This might have been brought to Malta after the fall of Cyprus to the Ottomans in 1571.

Relics of four saints named Boniface, Pia, Victor and Candida were placed in the sanctuary's altar in 1747. Relics of St Vincent were also given to the sanctuary later on by Dun Lawrenz Grech Delicata, after he had acquired them through Pope Pius VII from the Catacomb of Priscilla in Rome on 21 April 1820.

== Legacy ==
On 6 October 1999, MaltaPost issued a postage stamp and a miniature sheet to commemorate the centenary of the crowning of Our Lady of Mellieħa. The miniature sheet depicted the altarpiece while the stamp depicted one of the ex-voto paintings. A set of three stamps showing ex-voto paintings from the Mellieħa sanctuary with maritime subjects was also issued by MaltaPost on 29 July 2015.
