= Collegiate Church of Saint Lawrence, Vittoriosa =

Collegiate of Saint Lawrence
- The Collegiate Matrix Parish church of Saint Lawrence
- Il-Knisja Kolleġġjata Arċipretali u Matriċi ta' San Lawrenz
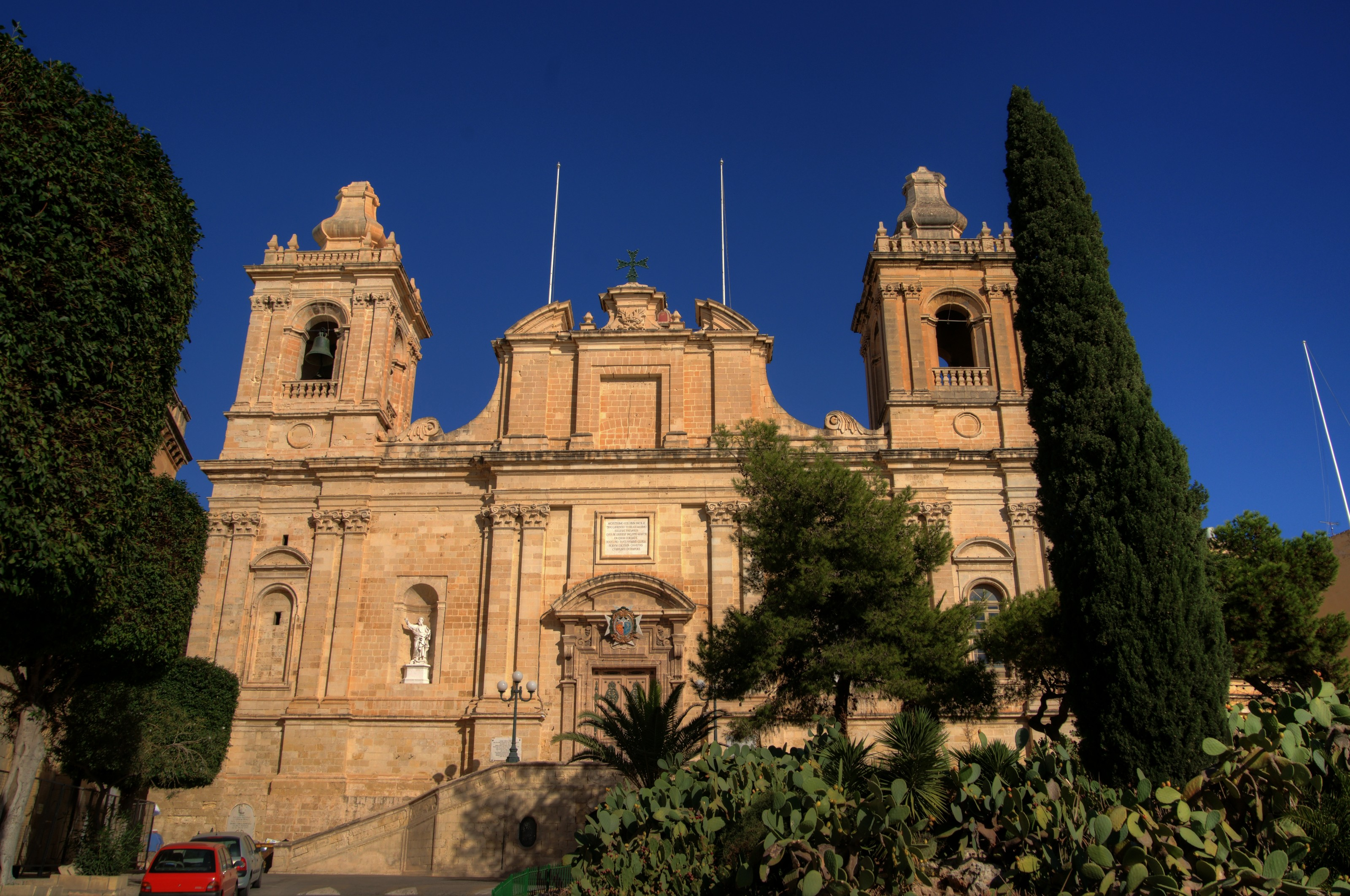
- Façade of the Church
- Collegiate of Saint Lawrence
- 35°53′14″N 14°31′17″E
- Location: Birgu, Malta
- Denomination: Roman Catholic

History
- Status: Active
- Founded: May 11, 1681
- Founder: Michele Molina
- Dedication: St Lawrence
- Consecrated: 24 October 1723

Architecture
- Functional status: Parish church Collegiate church
- Architect: Lorenzo Gafà
- Architectural type: Church
- Style: Baroque
- Completed: 10 August 1697

Specifications
- Materials: Limestone

Administration
- Archdiocese: Malta
- Parish: Birgu

The Collegiate church of Saint Lawrence (Maltese: Knisja kolleġġjata ta' San Lawrenz) is an old Church situated in Birgu in Malta.

== History ==
In the 'Rollo' (inventory) of the benefices of the churches and chapels in Malta and Gozo, held by Bishop de Mello in 1436, a total of 12 established chapels are mentioned, amongst them the Church of San Lorenzo a Mare.

When the Order of Saint John first settled in Malta in 1530, all of their langues were based in Birgu, so the Church of Saint Lawrence was used as the Order's first conventual church in Malta. It served this purpose for 41 years from 1530 to 1571 until the Knights were transferred to the new capital city Valletta. The foundation stone of the present church was laid in May 1681 by Bishop Molina. It was completed in 1696. The church was inaugurated by Bishop Davide Cocco Palmieri on the feast of St Lawrence, August 10, 1697. It was consecrated in 1723. In 1820, Pope Pius VII bestowed the dignity of Collegiate church upon the parish church of St Lawrence.

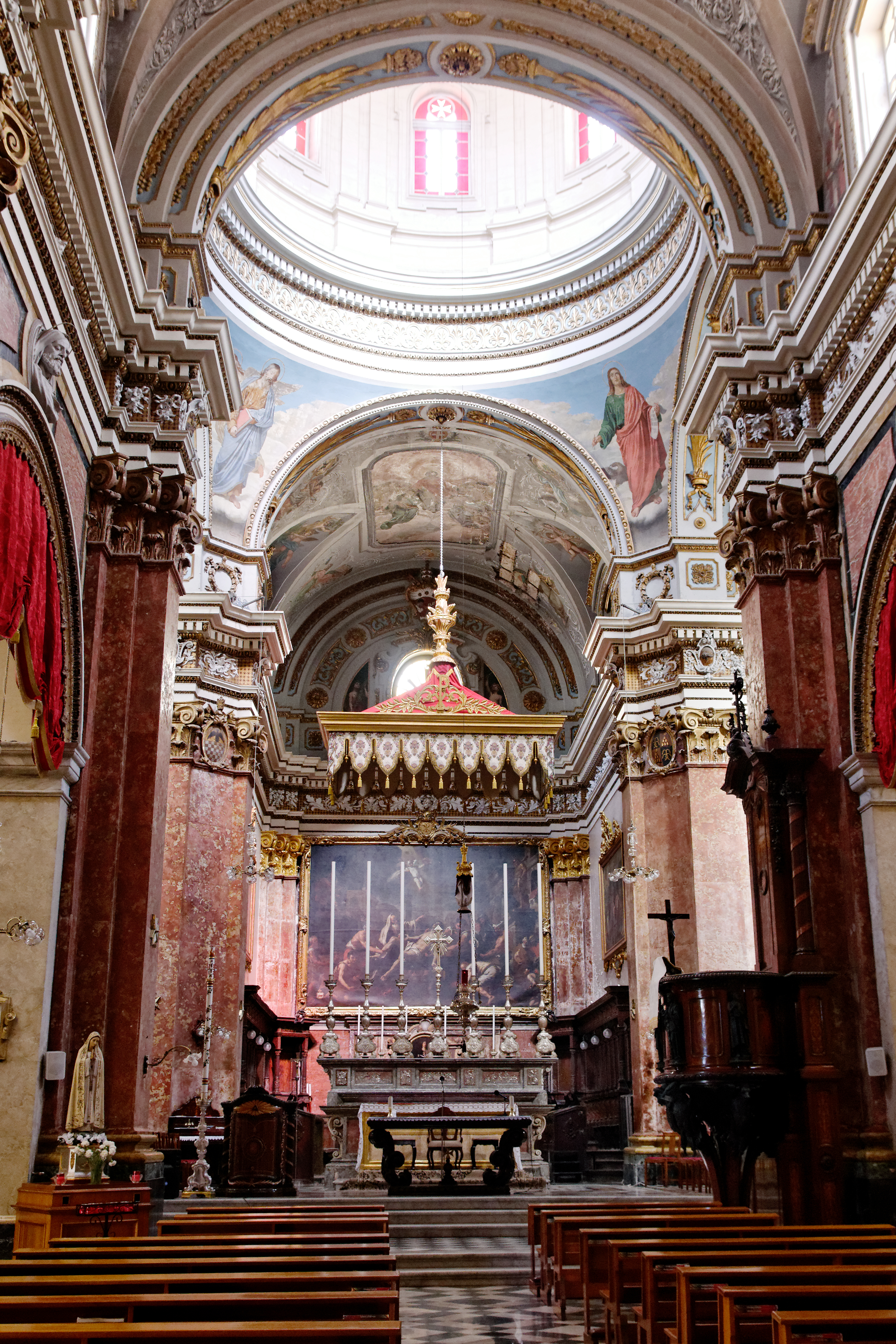
Interior of the church

=== War period ===
On January 16, 1941 the church was bombed in a German air raid. Both the sacristy and the chapter hall were destroyed. They were both rebuilt in 1949. On March 22, 1941, the chapel of the blessed Sacrament was destroyed and on April 4, 1942 the dome of the church was destroyed. The chapel was rebuilt in 1951 and the dome in 1952.

=== Present day ===
The church building is listed on the National Inventory of the Cultural Property of the Maltese Islands.

== Works of art ==
The church includes many works of art, amongst them the main altar piece by Mattia Preti showing the martyrdom of St Lawrence. Other works of art include paintings by Stefano Erardi, such as Christ the Saviour and The Dead Christ.

== See also ==
- Culture of Malta
- History of Malta
- List of Churches in Malta
- Religion in Malta
