= Stefano Erardi =

- Born: 1630; Valletta, Hospitaller Malta
- Died: 1716 (aged 85–86); Hospitaller Malta
- Occupation: Painter
- Style: Mannerist or Baroque
- Spouse: Caterina Buttigieg
- Children: Alessio Erardi
- Parents: Sebastiano Erardi (father); Paulica Xerri (mother)
- Relatives: Pietro Erardi (brother)

Stefano Erardi (1630–1716) was a Maltese painter whose works may be found in many churches around the Maltese Islands. His style has been described as either late Mannerist or Baroque.

== Biography ==
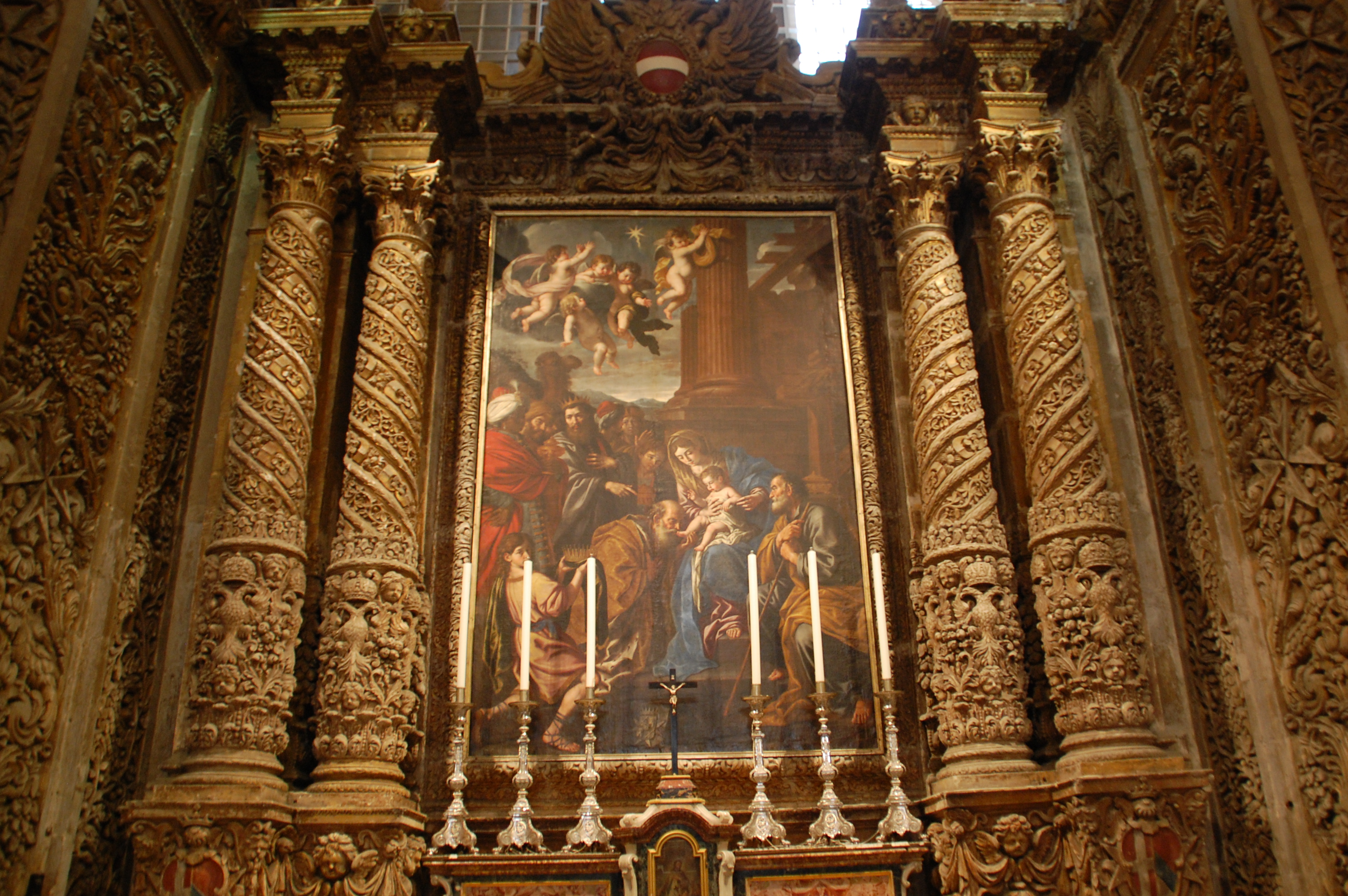
Adoration of the Magi (1667), Chapel of the Langue of Germany, St John's Co-Cathedral, Valletta

Erardi was born in Valletta in 1630 to Sebastiano Erardi and Paulica Xerri. His younger brother Pietro was also a minor artist. Erardi married Caterina Buttigieg, and their son Alessio Erardi also became a painter.

His works may be regarded as either late examples of Mannerism or early Baroque. Mannerism was outdated by Erardi's lifetime, but he probably became familiar with this style through studying paintings located in churches and collections in Malta. Erardi might have also been influenced by the works of Baroque artists such as Caravaggio, Domenichino and Guido Reni.

Erardi was favoured among the government and church authorities, and consequently his paintings may be found in many churches and collections around Malta. He also had connections with Sicily, Naples and Rome which were secured by the Order of St. John and the church.

== Works ==
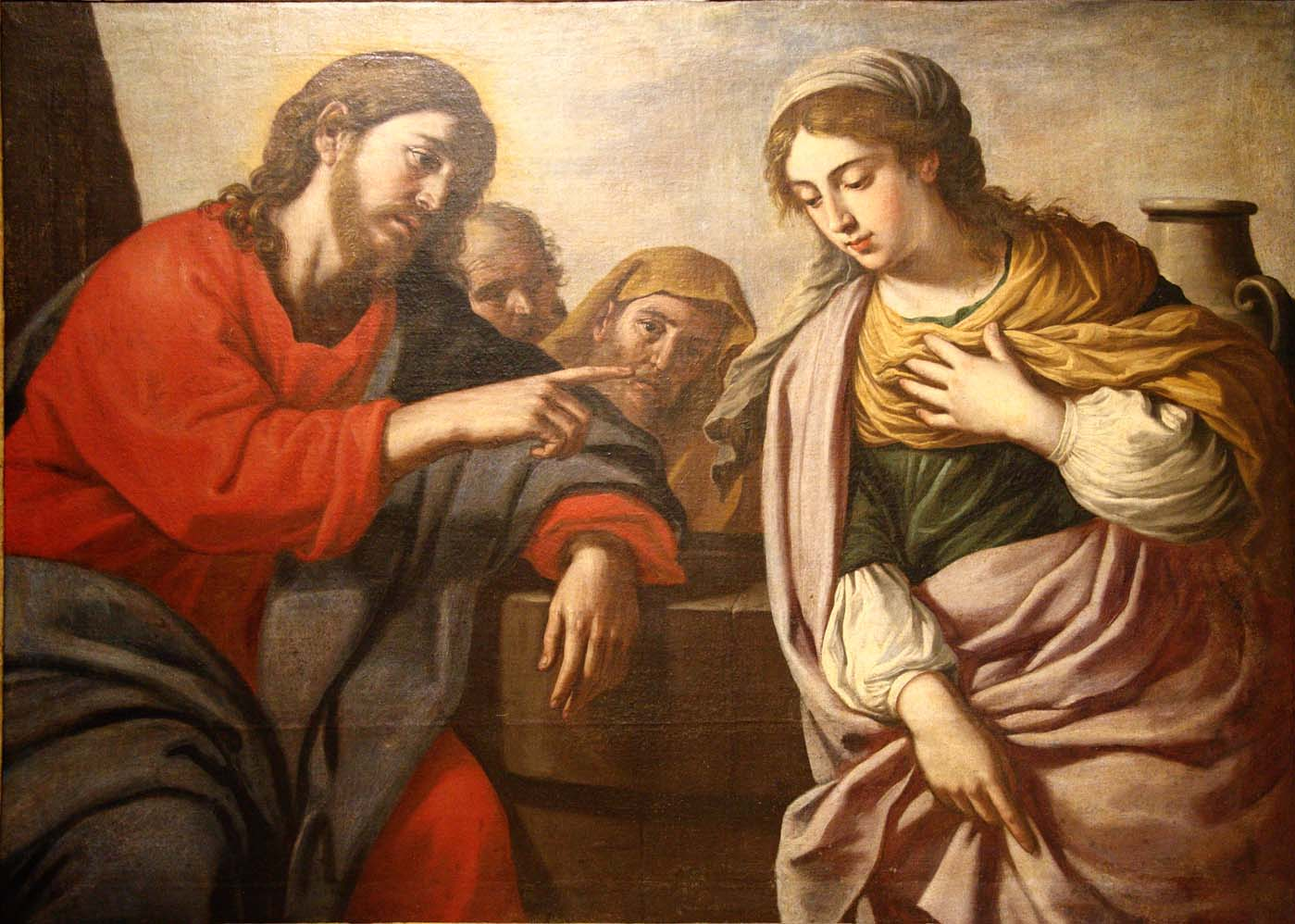
Christ and the Samaritan Woman (date unknown), National Museum of Fine Arts, Valletta

Works by Erardi may be found in many church buildings throughout Malta and Gozo. Some notable paintings attributed to him include Adoration of the Magi (1667) at the Chapel of the Langue of Germany in St John's Co-Cathedral, Our Lady with the Child Jesus at Mdina cathedral, and St Zita and St James and St Barbara at the Gozo cathedral. Several churches in Valletta contain paintings by Erardi, including the Collegiate Parish Church of St Paul's Shipwreck, the Jesuit church, and the churches of Our Lady of Pilar, St. Mary of Jesus, St. Nicholas and St. Roque.

Other paintings by Erardi may be found in the parish churches of Birgu, Birkirkara, Cospicua, Kirkop, Mosta, Msida, Naxxar, Qormi, Qrendi, Safi, Sannat, Victoria, Gozo and Żurrieq, along with the Sanctuary of Our Lady of Mellieħa and in numerous other churches and chapels.

Other works may be found in the Wignacourt Museum, the National Museum of Fine Arts and the Inquisitor's Palace.
