= Collegiate Church of the Immaculate Conception, Bormla =

Collegiate of the Immaculate Conception
- The Collegiate Parish church of the Immaculate Conception
- Il-knisja Kolleġġjata Arċipretali tal-Immakulata Kunċizzjoni
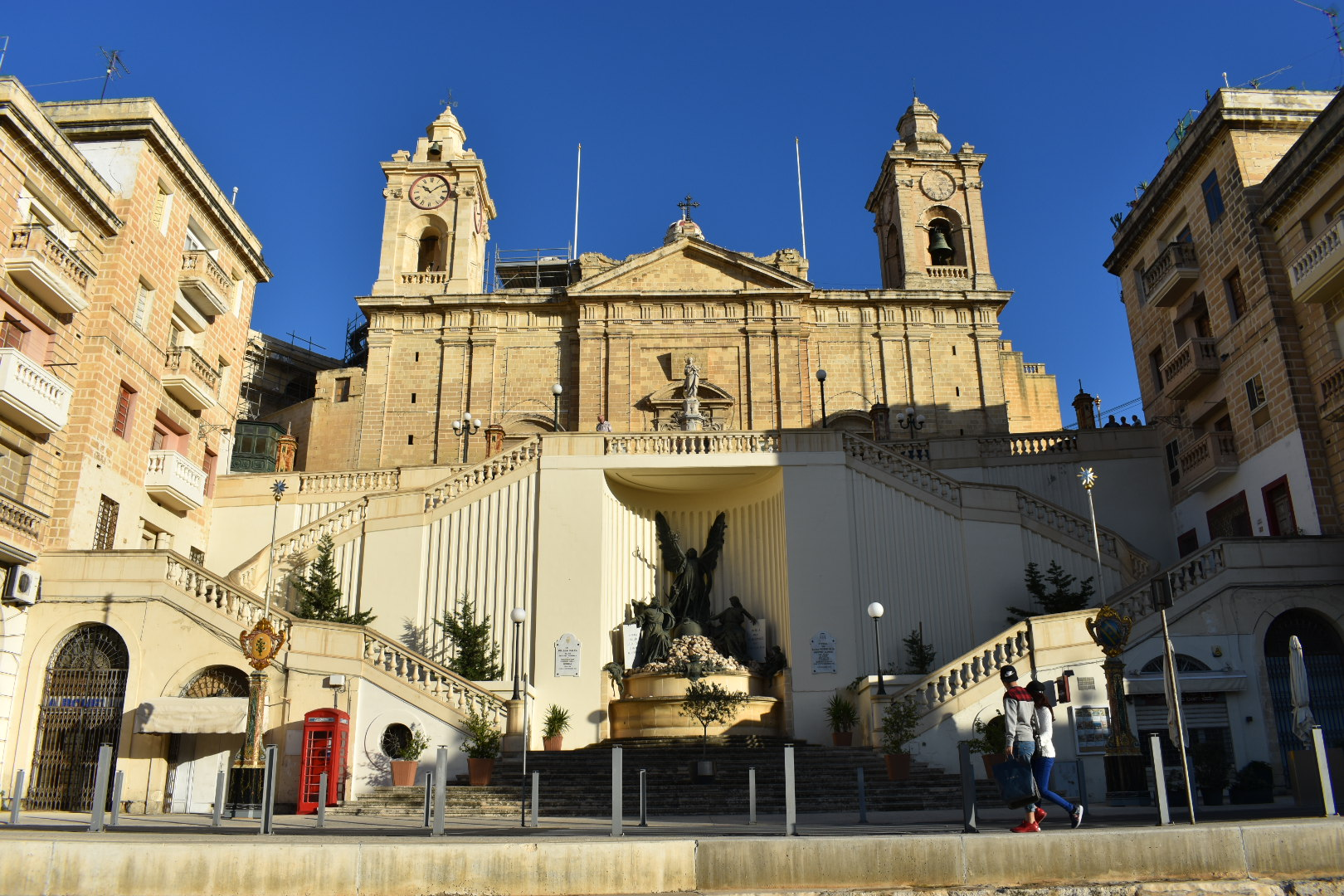
- The church towering above Cospicua

- Location within Malta
- 35°52′52.5″N 14°31′14.3″E
- Location: Cospicua
- Country: Malta
- Denomination: Roman Catholic
- Website: Website of the Basilica

History
- Status: Active
- Founded: 1586
- Dedication: Immaculate Conception
- Consecrated: 25 May 1732

Architecture
- Functional status: Collegiate; Parish church
- Architectural type: Church
- Style: Baroque
- Completed: 1730

Administration
- Archdiocese: Malta
- Parish: Cospicua

The Collegiate Church of the Immaculate Conception (Maltese: Il-Knisja Kolleġġjata tal-Immakulata Kunċizzjoni) is a Roman Catholic parish church located in Cospicua, Malta.

== History ==
The original parish church stood on the location of the present church. It was built before the Great Siege of Malta of 1565. It became a parish in 1586. Because of the growing number of parishioners it was decided to enlarge the church. But by 1684 the church became too small thus the construction of the present church commenced.

The designs of the church are attributed to Vincenzo Casanova while those of the bell towers are attributed to Lorenzo Gafà. The church was finished around 1730. In 1822 the church was elevated to the status of a collegiate church.

The dome includes paintings of David, Ezekiel, Moses and Isaiah by Giuseppe Calì from 1884.

The church building is listed on the National Inventory of the Cultural Property of the Maltese Islands.

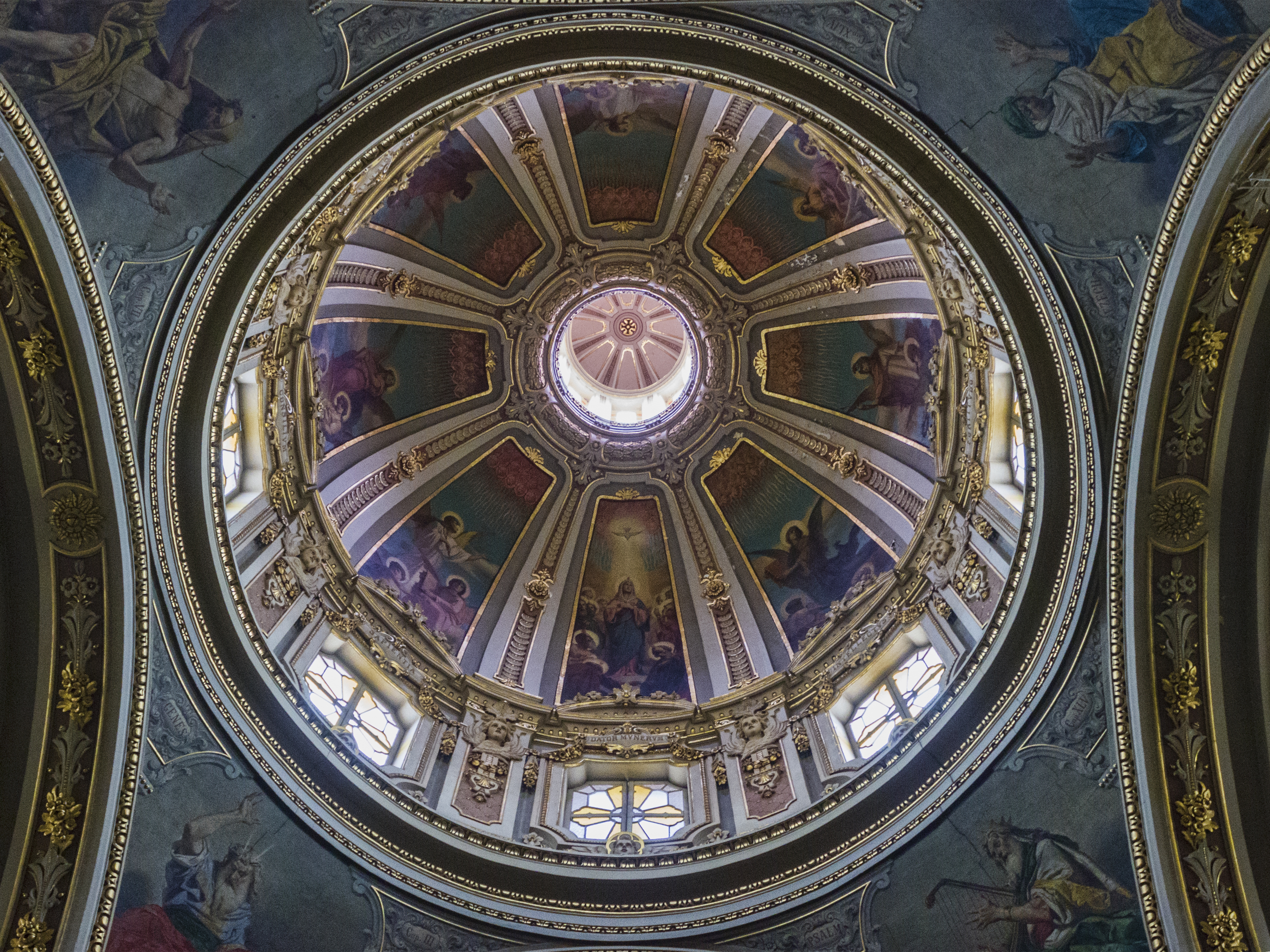
The interior of the dome of the Church of the Immaculate Conception in Bormla

== See also ==
- Culture of Malta
- History of Malta
- List of Churches in Malta
- Religion in Malta
