= List of monuments in Qrendi =

This is a list of monuments in Qrendi, Malta, which are listed on the National Inventory of the Cultural Property of the Maltese Islands.

== List ==
| Name of object | Location | Coordinates | ID | Photo | Upload |
|---|---|---|---|---|---|
| Mnajdra Temples | Triq il-Wied | 35°49′36″N 14°26′10″E | 00024 | Mnajdra Temples | Upload Photo |
| Ħaġar Qim Temples | Triq il-Wied | 35°49′39″N 14°26′31″E | 00025 | Ħaġar Qim Temples | Upload Photo |
| Niche of St. Catherine | Sqaq il-Mitħna | 35°50′21″N 14°27′45″E | 01251 | Niche of St. Catherine | Upload Photo |
| Chapel of St. Catherine | Triq L-Imqabba c/w Sqaq il-Mitħna | 35°50′20″N 14°27′44″E | 01252 | Chapel of St. Catherine | Upload Photo |
| Niche Madonna of Pompei | Triq Congreve, Wied iż-Żurrieq (Note: The niche of Madonna of Pompei listed as NICPMI Inv. No. 01296 has been incorrectly listed as located in Żurrieq. In fact it is situated on the area of Qrendi.) | 35°49′10″N 14°27′12″E | 01296 | Niche Madonna of Pompei | Upload Photo |
| Ħamrija Tower | | 35°52′47″N 14°28′56″E | 01387 | Ħamrija Tower | Upload Photo |
| Wied iż-Żurrieq Tower | Triq Congreve, Wied iż-Żurrieq | 35°49′10″N 14°27′13″E | 01388 | Wied iż-Żurrieq Tower | Upload Photo |
| Qrendi Tower - Torre Cavalieri | 33/34 Triq it-Torri | 35°50′11″N 14°27′29″E | 01429 | Qrendi Tower - Torre Cavalieri | Upload Photo |
| Niche of the Immaculate Conception | 1 Triq Luigi Pace c/w Triq Antonio Chircop | 35°50′02″N 14°27′36″E | 01758 | Niche of the Immaculate Conception | Upload Photo |
| Niche of St Joseph | 1 Triq Dun Rajmond Ellul c/w 10 Triq Rokku Buħagiar | 35°50′02″N 14°27′34″E | 01759 | Niche of St Joseph | Upload Photo |
| Niche of the Madonna of Lourdes | 2 Triq Dun Rajmond Ellul c/w 8 Triq Rokku Buħagiar | 35°50′02″N 14°27′35″E | 01760 | Niche of the Madonna of Lourdes | Upload Photo |
| Niche of St Fidel | 2 Triq Rokku Buħagiar c/w Triq Antonio Chircop | 35°50′01″N 14°27′35″E | 01761 | Niche of St Fidel | Upload Photo |
| Niche of the Madonna of Mercy | 27/29 Triq il-Ħniena | 35°50′03″N 14°27′33″E | 01762 | Niche of the Madonna of Mercy | Upload Photo |
| Niche of the Madonna of Lourdes | 42 Triq il-Kbira c/w 1 Triq id-Dejqa | 35°50′05″N 14°27′32″E | 01763 | Niche of the Madonna of Lourdes | Upload Photo |
| Niche of the Madonna and Child | 27 Triq il-Kbira | 35°50′07″N 14°27′33″E | 01764 | Niche of the Madonna and Child | Upload Photo |
| Church of Christ the Savior | Triq is-Salvatur c/w Triq iż-Żurrieq | 35°50′09″N 14°27′35″E | 01765 | Church of Christ the Savior | Upload Photo |
| Empty Niche | "Sunrise", 18 Triq iż-Żurrieq | 35°50′09″N 14°27′35″E | 01766 | Empty Niche | Upload Photo |
| Niche of the Assumption | "Pax Et Bonum", 9 Triq iż-Żurrieq | 35°50′09″N 14°27′38″E | 01767 | Niche of the Assumption | Upload Photo |
| Empty Niche | Triq iż-Żurrieq c/w Triq Filippu Zammit | 35°50′08″N 14°27′38″E | 01768 | Empty Niche | Upload Photo |
| Niche of the Assumption | 29 Triq iż-Żurrieq | 35°50′09″N 14°27′39″E | 01769 | Niche of the Assumption | Upload Photo |
| Niche of St Paul | "Rosaria", 48 Triq iż-Żurrieq | 35°50′08″N 14°27′42″E | 01770 | Niche of St Paul | Upload Photo |
| Niche of the Assumption | 41 Triq it-Torri | 35°50′12″N 14°27′32″E | 01771 | Niche of the Assumption | Upload Photo |
| Niche of St Paul | 15 Misraħ Santa Marija c/w Triq id-Dejqa | 35°50′06″N 14°27′31″E | 01772 | Niche of St Paul | Upload Photo |
| Niche of the Madonna of Lourdes | "Każin tal-Banda Lourdes", Misraħ Santa Marija | 35°50′06″N 14°27′29″E | 01773 | Niche of the Madonna of Lourdes | Upload Photo |
| Niche of the Pieta | 3 Triq il-Parroċċa | 35°50′05″N 14°27′29″E | 01774 | Niche of the Pieta | Upload Photo |
| Niche of St Joseph | Sqaq il-Parroċċa Nru. 2 c/w 5 Triq il-Parroċċa | 35°50′05″N 14°27′29″E | 01775 | Niche of St Joseph | Upload Photo |
| Statue of St Roque | 16 Triq il-Parroċċa | 35°50′05″N 14°27′29″E | 01776 | Statue of St Roque | Upload Photo |
| Statue of the Assumption | 28/30 Triq il-Parroċċa | 35°50′04″N 14°27′28″E | 01777 | Statue of the Assumption | Upload Photo |
| Parish Church of the Assumption | Triq il-Parroċċa | 35°50′04″N 14°27′27″E | 01778 | Parish Church of the Assumption | Upload Photo |
| Niċċa ta’ Santa Anna, San Ġwakkin u il-Madonna | 1 Triq il-Kurat Mizzi | 35°50′03″N 14°27′27″E | 01779 | Niċċa ta’ Santa Anna, San Ġwakkin u il-Madonna | Upload Photo |
| Niche of St John the Baptist | 1 Triq il-Kurat Mizzi | 35°50′03″N 14°27′27″E | 01780 | Niche of St John the Baptist | Upload Photo |
| Niche of St Matthew | 1 Triq il-Kurat Mizzi | 35°50′03″N 14°27′27″E | 01781 | Niche of St Matthew | Upload Photo |
| Statue of the Assumption | 1 Triq il-Kurat Mizzi | 35°50′03″N 14°27′27″E | 01782 | Statue of the Assumption | Upload Photo |
| Niche of St Michael | 85 Triq il-Kbira | 35°50′01″N 14°27′30″E | 01783 | Niche of St Michael | Upload Photo |
| Niche of the Assumption | 78 Triq il-Kbira c/w Triq il-Knisja | 35°50′01″N 14°27′28″E | 01784 | Niche of the Assumption | Upload Photo |
| Niche of St George | 8 Triq San Mattew c/w 2 Triq il-Parroċċa | 35°49′59″N 14°27′26″E | 01785 | Niche of St George | Upload Photo |
| Statue of St Matthew | Misraħ San Mattew | 35°49′59″N 14°27′26″E | 01786 | Statue of St Matthew | Upload Photo |
| Statue of St Anne | Triq Sant'Anna | 35°49′56″N 14°27′26″E | 01787 | Statue of St Anne | Upload Photo |
| Church of St Matthew the Apostle | Misraħ tal-Maqluba | 35°49′52″N 14°27′24″E | 01788 | Church of St Matthew the Apostle | Upload Photo |
| Church of the Madonna of Mediatrix of all Graces | Triq San Mattew c/w Triq il-Bali Guarena | 35°49′53″N 14°27′14″E | 01789 | Church of the Madonna of Mediatrix of all Graces | Upload Photo |
| Statue of the Madonna of Mercy | Triq tal-Ħniena | 35°49′55″N 14°27′49″E | 01790 | | Upload Photo |
| Church of the Madonna of Mercy | Triq tal-Ħniena | 35°49′55″N 14°27′49″E | 01791 | Church of the Madonna of Mercy | Upload Photo |
| Crucifix | Triq L-Imqabba c/w Triq il-Warda | 35°50′19″N 14°27′45″E | 01792 | Crucifix | Upload Photo |
| Niche of St Joseph | "Sinai", 8 Sqaq San Nikola Nru. 1 | 35°50′08″N 14°27′31″E | 01793 | Niche of St Joseph | Upload Photo |
| Empty Niche | Triq San Nikola | 35°50′11″N 14°27′23″E | 01794 | Empty Niche | Upload Photo |
| Empty Niche (now with a statue of the Assumption) | Triq R.A.F. Krendi (former 115 Triq San Nikola) | 35°50′12″N 14°27′20″E | 01795 | Empty Niche (now with a statue of the Assumption) | Upload Photo |
| Empty Niche | Triq Misraħ is-Sinjura c/w Triq San Nikola | 35°50′12″N 14°27′21″E | 01796 | Empty Niche | Upload Photo |
| Niche of the Madonna of the Girdle | 48 Triq Santa Katerina | 35°50′11″N 14°27′35″E | 01797 | Niche of the Madonna of the Girdle | Upload Photo |
| Relief of the Eucharist | 12/14 Triq Santa Katerina | 35°50′11″N 14°27′35″E | 01798 | Relief of the Eucharist | Upload Photo |
| Niche of the Assumption | 16 Triq Santa Katerina | 35°50′11″N 14°27′35″E | 01799 | Niche of the Assumption | Upload Photo |
| Niche of the Madonna of the Girdle | 31 Triq Santa Katerina | 35°50′13″N 14°27′36″E | 01800 | Niche of the Madonna of the Girdle | Upload Photo |
| Crucifix | "Aurora", 50A Triq Santa Katerina | 35°50′14″N 14°27′37″E | 01801 | Crucifix | Upload Photo |
| Niche of the Madonna | Triq il-Kurat Mizzi / Triq Filippu Gutenberg | 35°50′04″N 14°27′20″E | 01802 | Niche of the Madonna | Upload Photo |
| Niche of St Joseph | "Rosenheim", 20 Triq il-Bali Guarena | 35°49′53″N 14°27′14″E | 01803 | Niche of St Joseph | Upload Photo |
