= St Matthew's Chapel, Qrendi =

Chapel of St Matthew
- The Chapel of Saint Matthew the smaller
- Il-Knisja ta' San Mattew Iż-Żgħir
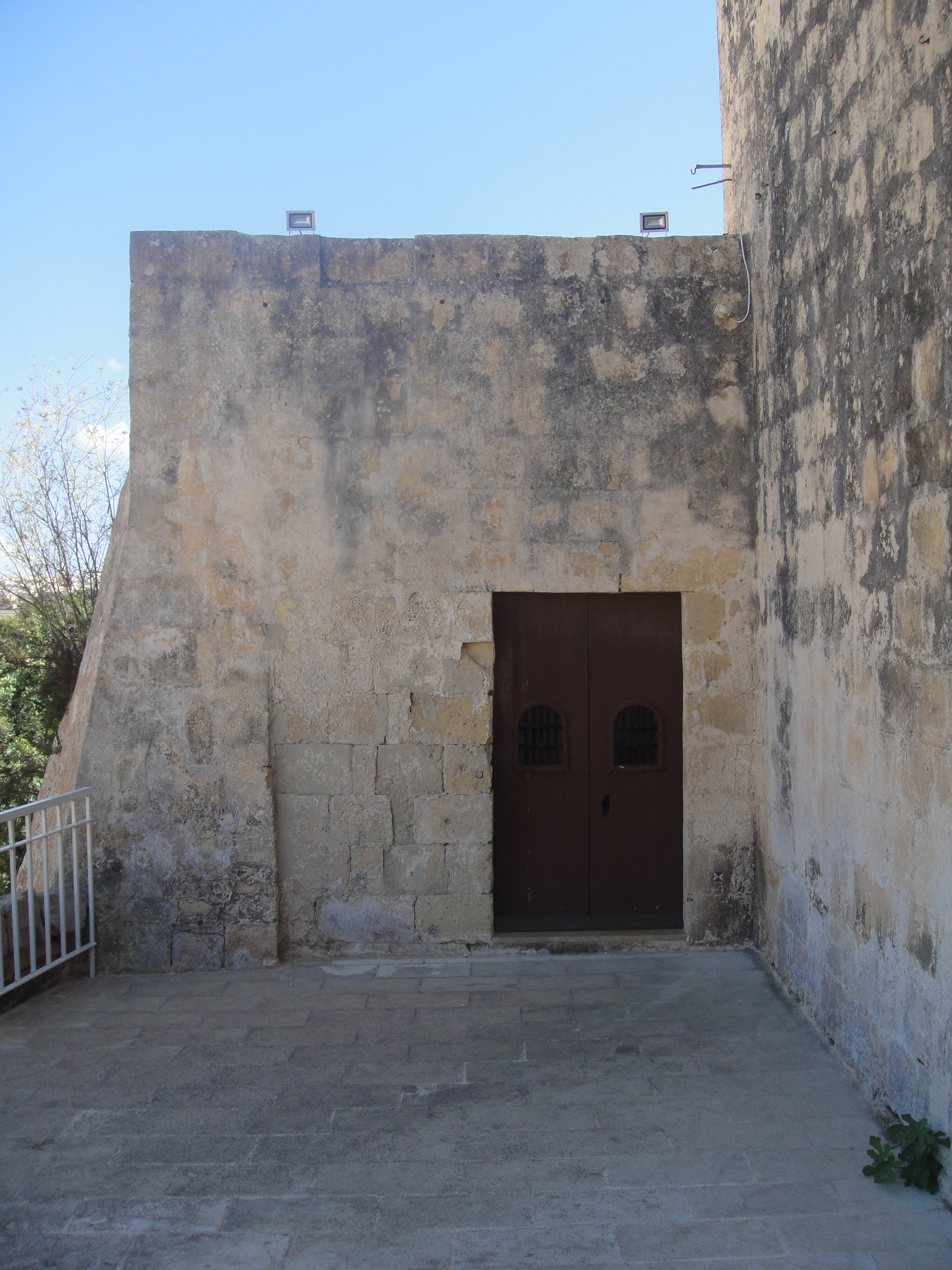

- Location within Malta
- 35°49′51.8″N 14°27′24.0″E
- Location: Qrendi
- Country: Malta
- Denomination: Roman Catholic

History
- Founded: c. 11th century
- Dedication: Matthew the Apostle

Architecture
- Style: Medieval

Administration
- Diocese: Malta
- Parish: Qrendi

Clergy
- Archbishop: Charles Scicluna

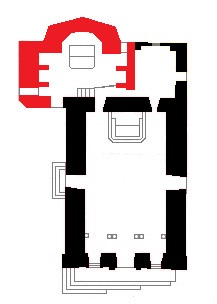
Plan of St Matthew Church in black and St Matthew Chapel in red

The Chapel of St Matthew, popularly known as San Mattew Iż-Żgħir, literally meaning Saint Matthew the smaller, is a small medieval chapel located beside a larger church with the same name in an area known as il-Maqluba in Qrendi, Malta. The use of the word the smaller is used that one would not confuse it with the larger St Matthew's church.

== History ==
=== Origins and legend ===
The chapel of St Matthew has been in existence since at least the 14th century, probably dating back to the 11th century. It is mentioned in a local legend said to have occurred in 1343. There are various versions of this legend however one of these versions says that all the people of the small village beside the chapel were living in sin and one day the whole village was consumed by the earth where a large pit was formed in place. The only building to escape this tragedy was the chapel of St Matthew in which an old pious woman was at the moment of the engulfment. However, most probably this large pit, a sinkhole, known as il-Maqluba was formed as a result of a violent storm that hit the island on November 14, 1343.

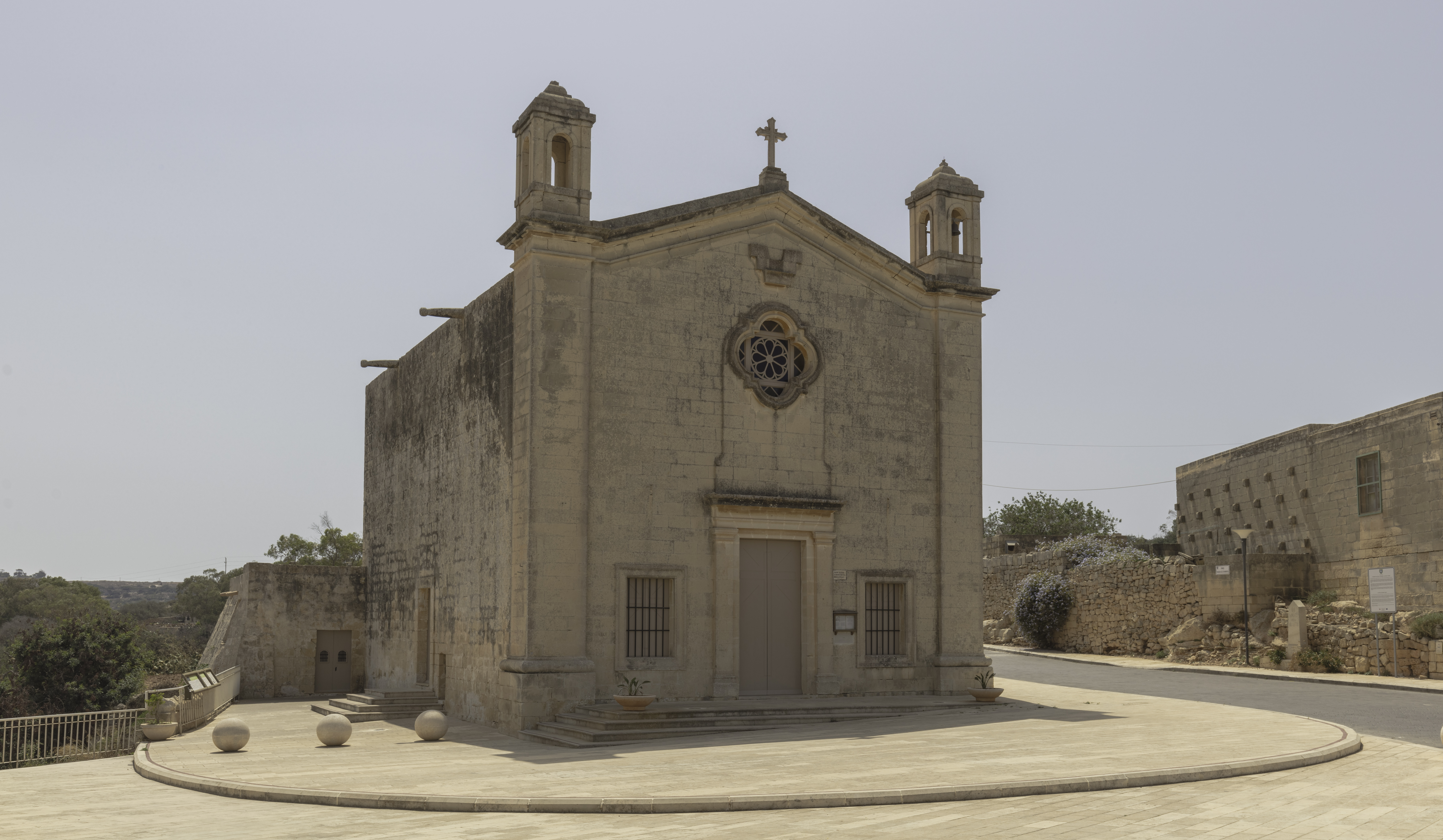
The chapel of St Matthew beside the larger church of St Matthew

=== Documentation ===
Nonetheless, this chapel was not mentioned in Bishop De Mello's report of 1436 as existing at that time however noteworthy to mention is that the Bishop's report only mentioned parish churches, prebends, cononriers and benefices, thus the small chapel would not have been mentioned. The small chapel of St Matthew was also mentioned in inquisitor Pietro Dusina's report during his apostolic visit to Malta in 1575. Dusina describes that the chapel was equipped with all necessarily means to celebrate the divine office.

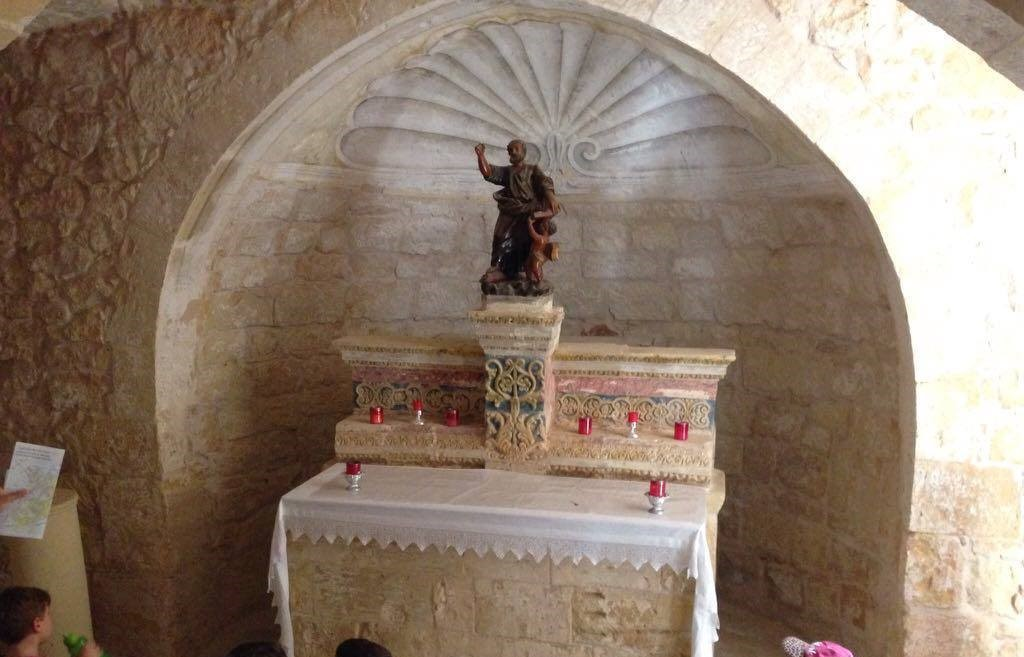
The interior of the chapel

=== Building of a larger church ===
As the larger church was built between 1674 and 1682, the small chapel was annexed by a small stairs and doorway and was used as the crypt of the large church. Its size was greatly reduced with this annexation. The chapel's exterior is quite simple. It is built in a rectangular style with a small belfry on top. In 1942, as the larger church was severely damaged by an air raid, the small chapel's belfry was damaged as well which was later dismantled and never rebuilt.

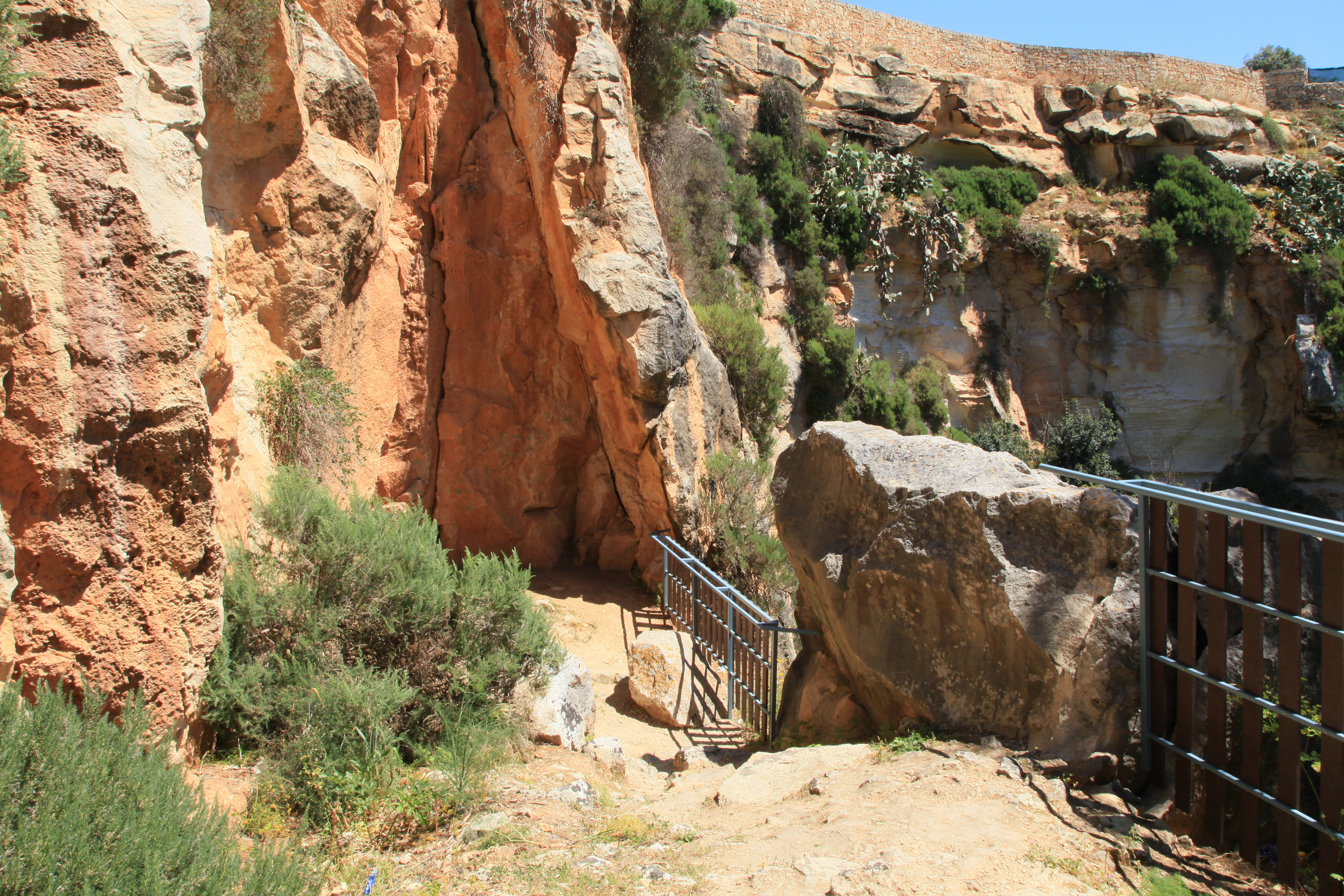
The Maqluba sinkhole

== Interior ==
The chapel's interior is quite simple. It has one stone altar with the date 1897 inscribed on it. There is also a small statue of St Matthew on the altar. Just above of the altar there is a little apse decorated with a well-preserved fresco of a scallop shell. The interior is built in pointed archways, typical to medieval church buildings in Malta. A painting depicting St Matthew was also reported as being present in the chapel however no one knows what happened to this painting.
