= Lampedusa (disambiguation) =

Lampedusa is the southernmost island of Italy.

Lampedusa may also refer to:

- Lampedusa (gastropod), a genus of gastropods
- Giuseppe Tomasi di Lampedusa (1896–1957), Italian writer
- 14846 Lampedusa, a minor planet
