= Church of St Matthew, Qrendi =

Church of St Matthew
- The Church of Saint Matthew
- Il-Knisja ta' San Mattew
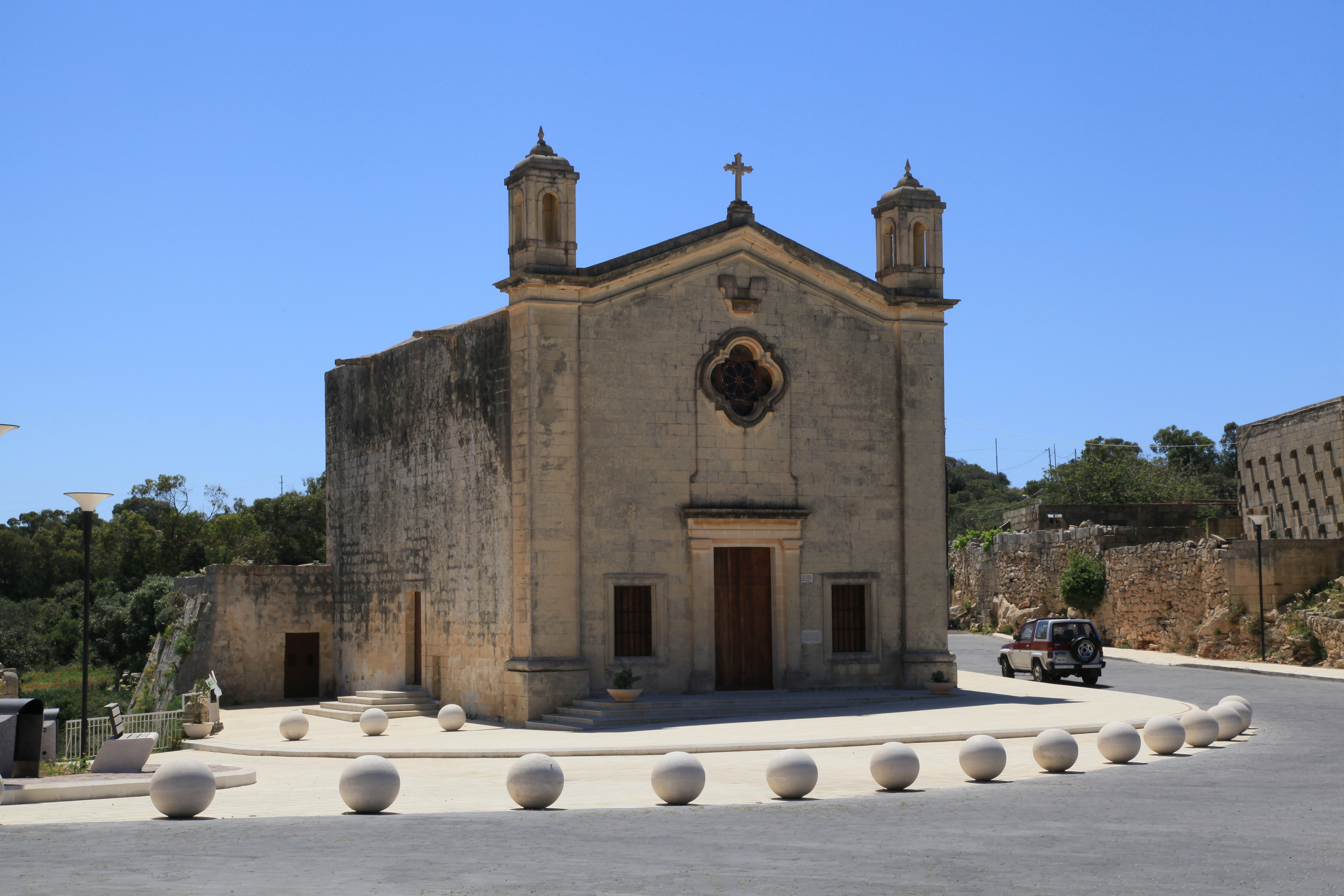

- Location within Malta
- 35°49′51.8″N 14°27′24.0″E
- Location: Qrendi
- Country: Malta
- Denomination: Roman Catholic

History
- Status: Active
- Founded: 1674
- Dedication: Matthew the Apostle

Architecture
- Functional status: Church
- Completed: 1682

Administration
- Diocese: Malta
- Parish: Qrendi

Clergy
- Archbishop: Charles Scicluna

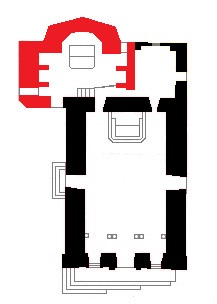
Plan of St Matthew Church in black and St Matthew Chapel in red

The Church of St Matthew, also known as San Mattew tal-Maqluba, is a Roman Catholic church situated on the outskirts of Qrendi overlooking the Maqluba sinkhole in Malta. The 17th-century church adjoins a smaller, older medieval chapel known as St Matthew's Chapel, Qrendi, located just on the right hand side of the church.

== History ==
The larger chapel of St. Matthew was built between 1674 and 1682. It was blessed by Dumink Formosa on September 12, 1683, the parish priest of the newly formed parish of Qrendi, which, together with the villages of Ħal Manin and Ħal Lew, had split off from the main parish of Żurrieq.

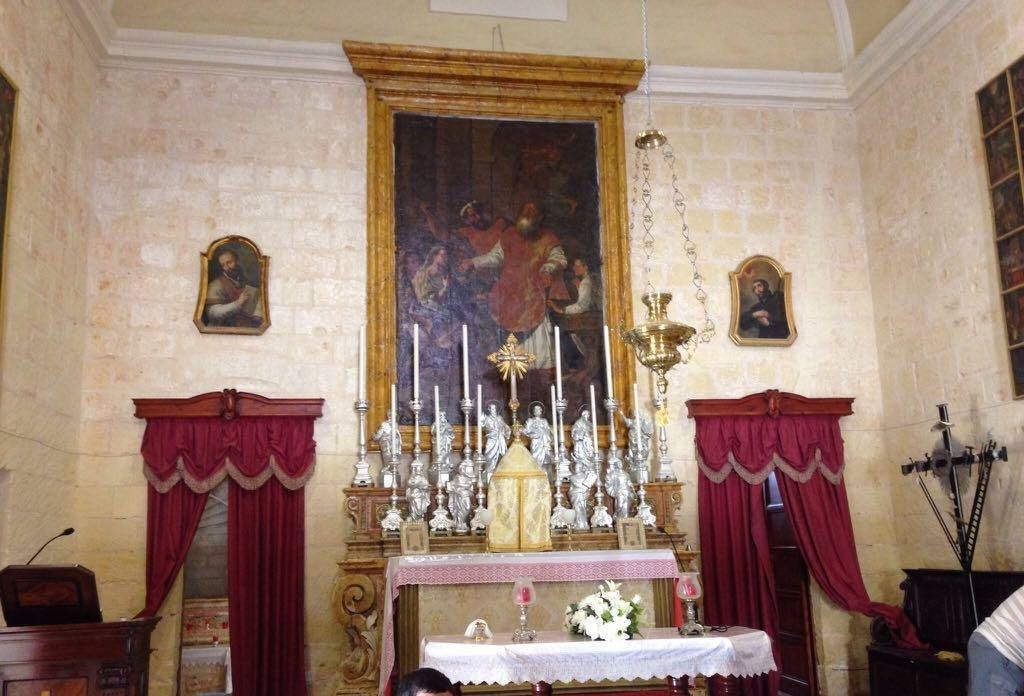
The interior

On April 12, 1942, during World War II, the church suffered severe structural damage as a result of a direct hit by Nazi cluster bombs, it being so close to the nearby military airfield.

The church's restoration was overseen by architect and engineer S. Privitera. The facade was rebuilt, with the original large central stone cross being replaced with a smaller one and two small belfries added. The central ornamental window on the facade was also enlarged and lowered to improve the interior lighting. A traditional staircase consisting of stair corbels protruding from the chapel's western side, allowing access to the roof, was also removed.

== Works of art ==
The main painting behind the high altar, attributed to Mattia Preti, depicts the martyrdom of St Matthew the Apostle and dates from 1688. It is believed that this painting was commissioned by the French Commendatory Nicola’ Communette. In 1984 this painting was stolen by was later recovered and kept for some time in the cathedral museum. An organ gallery was also built in 1834.
