= Shrine of Our Lady of Mercy, Qrendi =

Our Lady of Mercy Church
- The Shrine of Our Lady of Mercy
- Is-Santwarju tal Madonna tal-Ħniena
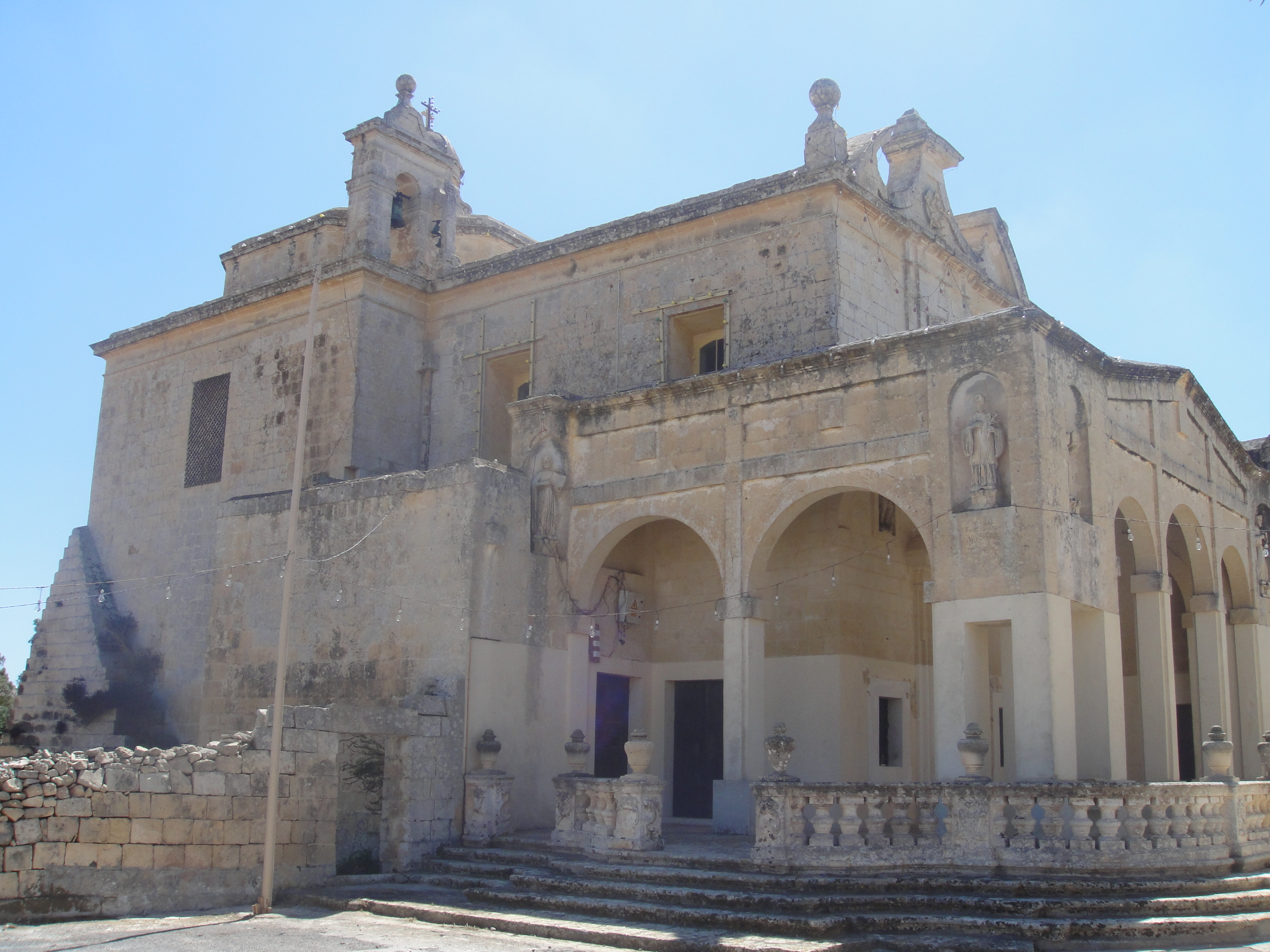

- Location within Malta
- 35°49′54.5″N 14°27′48.8″E
- Location: Qrendi
- Country: Malta
- Denomination: Roman Catholic

History
- Founded: 1650
- Dedication: Our Lady of Mercy

Administration
- Diocese: Malta
- Parish: Qrendi

Clergy
- Archbishop: Charles Scicluna

The Shrine of Our Lady of Mercy also known as Chiesa Della Misericordia or simply known as Tal-Ħniena is a Roman Catholic church located i the village of Qrendi, Malta. The church is referred to as a sanctuary due to people's devotion to the Virgin Mary of Mercy.

== History ==
The area where the church is built used to form part of the medieval hamlet known as Ħal Lew which at that time formed part of the parish of Żurrieq. The original church was probably built sometime in the 13th century. In 1575 inquisitor Pietro Dusina visited the church and reported that it was in a bad state. Moreover, he ordered that the church be deconsecrated and closed. However, devotion to the Virgin of Mercy continued in this church, as evidenced in the numerous Ex-voto paintings in the church.

The church was rebuilt in 1650. In 1668 the sacristy was added to the building. In 1695. through the initiative if Reverend Domenico Formosa, Pope Innocent XII granted the permission of indulgences to anyone who visited the church. Nowadays, a pilgrimage is done every year from the parish of Qrendi to the church of Our Lady of Mercy on the feast day which takes place on the Sunday following September 8th.

== Interior ==
The high altar is decorated with numerous angels sculpted in stone. The angels appear to hold the titular painting while two seem to crown the Virgin Mary. The titular painting depicts the Virgin Mary with baby Jesus in her hands while stepping on the moon. On the right of the painting one notices Saint Cajetan while on the left there are some souls depicted. The painting is attributed to Gużeppi D’Arena. Other paintings of notable interest include the one known as Awżiljaturi or helpers which includes a total of 14 saints which the Maltese used to invoke against the plague and other troubles. The saints are Saint Blase, Saint George, Saint Erasmus of Formia, Saint Pantaleon, Saint Vitus, Saint Christopher, St Denis, St Cyriacus, St Agathius, Saint Eustace, Saint Giles, St Margaret, Saint Barbara and St Catherine.

Other notable paintings include the one depicting the seven deadly sins; wrath, avarice, sloth, pride, lust, envy and gluttony. This painter depicted a donkey burdened with a number of baskets filled with vices. Each basket had inscribed upon it the particular sin. The donkey symbolises Satan drawn in a very ugly form while on the left of the picture one notes a man in confession.
