= Lampedusa melitensis =

Conservation status
- Critically Endangered (IUCN 3.1)

Scientific classification
- Kingdom: Animalia
- Phylum: Mollusca
- Class: Gastropoda
- Order: Stylommatophora
- Family: Clausiliidae
- Genus: Lampedusa
- Species: L. melitensis

Binomial name
- Lampedusa melitensis (Caruana Gatto, 1892)

Synonyms
- Clausilia melitensis Caruana Gatto, 1892

Species of gastropod

Lampedusa melitensis (common name: Maltese door-snail) is a species of small, very elongate, left-handed air-breathing land snail, a sinistral terrestrial pulmonate gastropod mollusk in the family Clausiliidae, the door snails, all of which have a clausilium.

This species is endemic to Malta and only known from a single locality on the western coastal cliffs.
