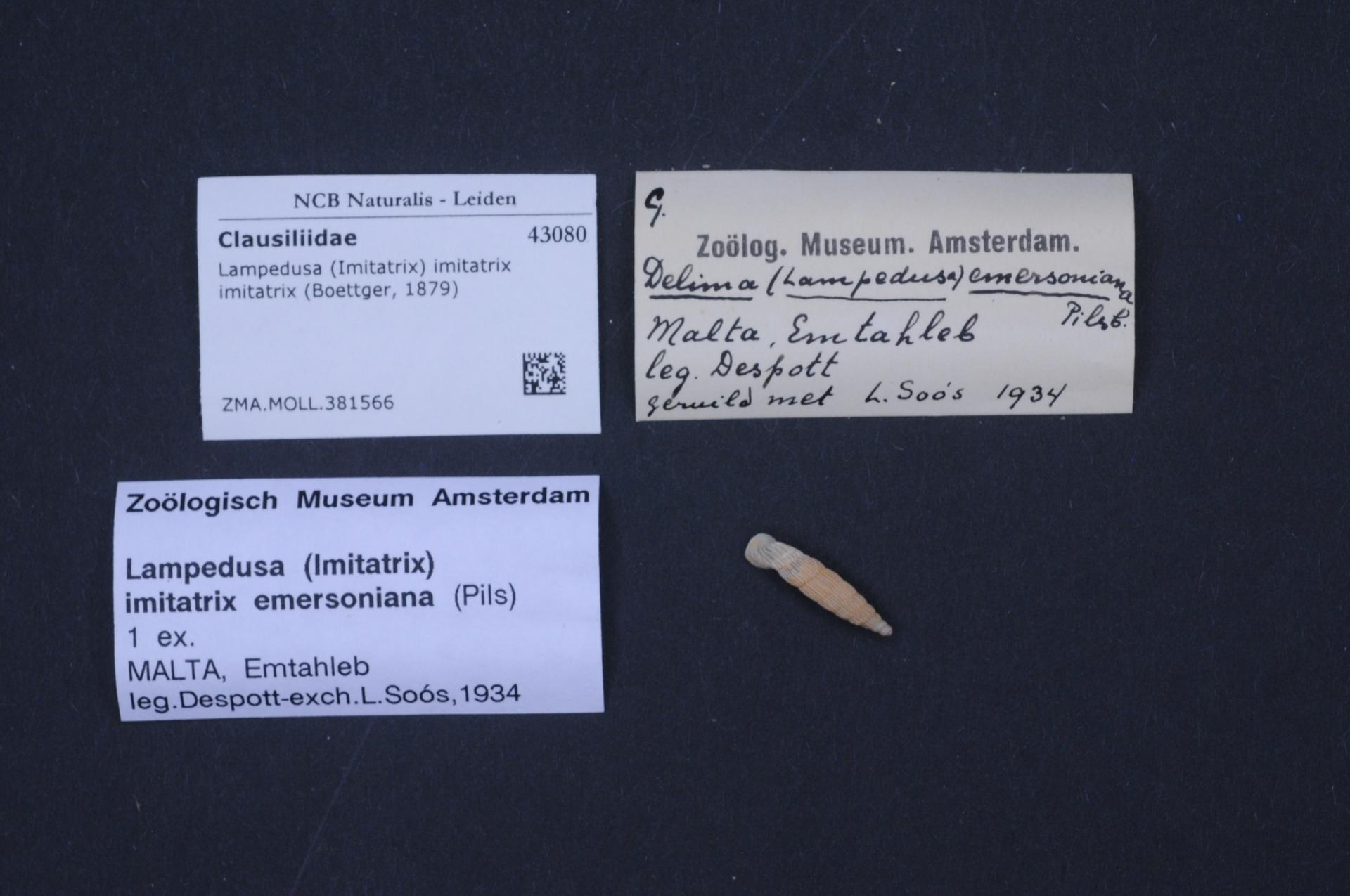

Conservation status
- Endangered (IUCN 3.1)

Scientific classification
- Kingdom: Animalia
- Phylum: Mollusca
- Class: Gastropoda
- Order: Stylommatophora
- Family: Clausiliidae
- Genus: Lampedusa
- Species: L. imitatrix

Binomial name
- Lampedusa imitatrix (Boettger, 1879)

= Lampedusa imitatrix =

Species of gastropod

Lampedusa imitatrix (common name: Maltese door-snail) is a species of small, very elongate, air-breathing land snail, a terrestrial pulmonate gastropod mollusk in the family Clausiliidae, the door snails, all of which have a clausilium.

This species is endemic to Malta. The population on the islet of Filfla might be a subspecies or a species in its own right.
