= Maqluba (Malta) =

Sinkhole in Qrendi, Malta

Il-Maqluba Qrendi
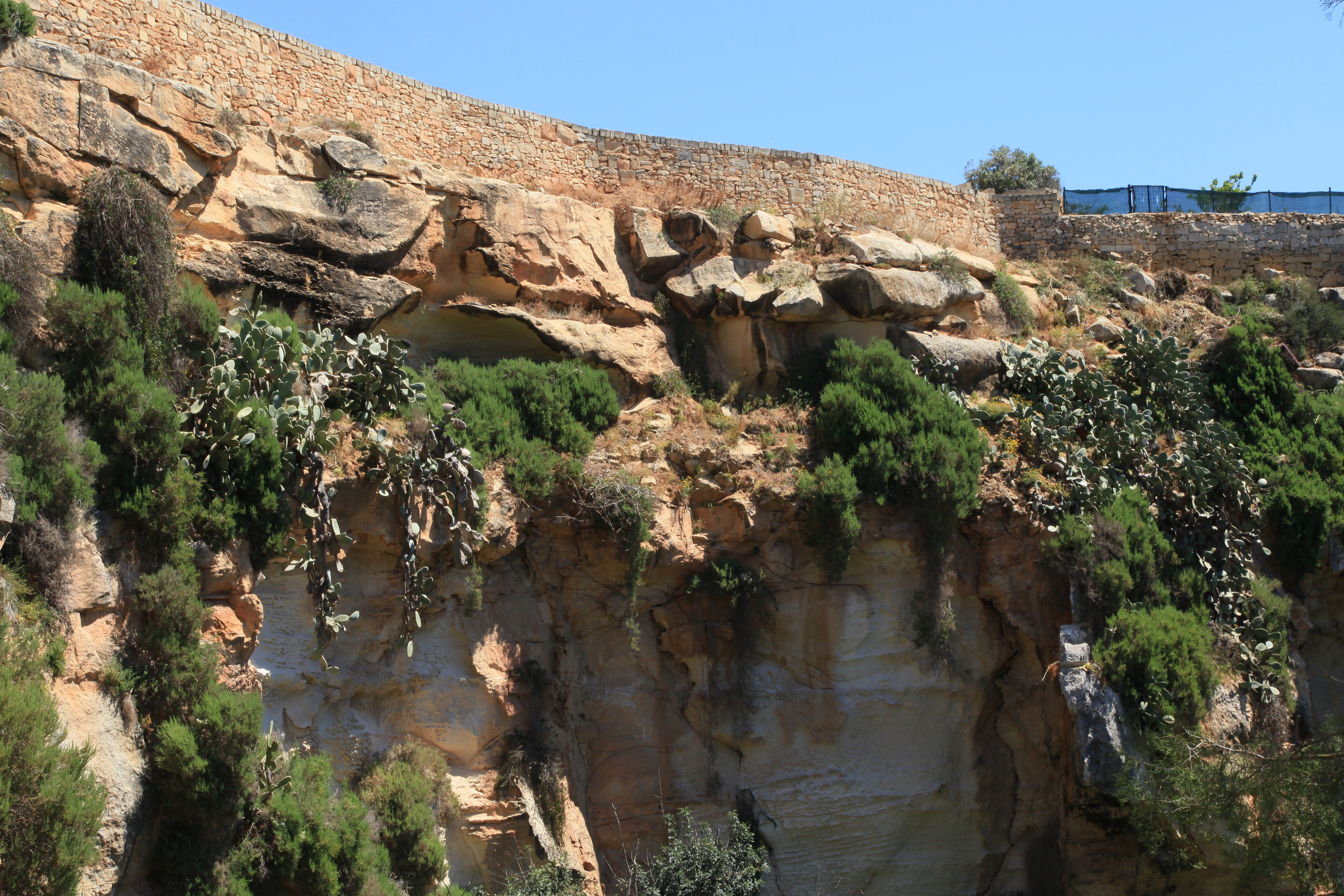

- Location within Malta
- Location: Qrendi
- Coordinates: 35°49′50″N 14°27′28″E
- Basin countries: Malta
- Surface area: 4,765 square metres (51,290 sq ft)
- Average depth: 15 m (49 ft)

Il-Maqluba (meaning overturned or upside-down in Maltese) is a sinkhole with a surface area of around 4,765 square metres (51,290 sq ft) situated in the village of Qrendi in Malta. Il-Maqluba is a Special Area of Conservation – Candidate Site of International Importance and designated as a Tree Protection Area, forming part of Natura 2000 sites, a network of nature protection areas within the European Union, also earning the European Destination of Excellence title bestowed onto the locality by the European Union's Commission for Tourism.

Visitors are forbidden to venture down to the bottom-most level of the sinkhole, but can admire the sinkhole from a viewing belvedere midway into the Maqluba.

== Geological formation ==
Like all sinkholes, this cavity was formed by the collapse of a limestone floor situated above a cavity hollowed out by water flowing in a karstic relief. The diameter is around 50 m, and the depth is around 15 m, the area approximately 4,765 square metres (51,290 sq ft) and the perimeter 300 m. It is composed of blue clay and globigerina limestone that top the lower coralline limestone or żonqor. The area is a place of natural interest formed via the power of storm water runoff water which percolated through cracks and crevices. This gradual, yet constant, penetration created caverns which became larger with the passing of time thus producing a hollow that was eventually unable to support the overlying top layer, which eventually collapsed and created the doline that can be seen today.

In the 1930s and before, the sinkhole might fill almost completely with water after heavy rainfall. The water would disappear after a couple of days penetrating the underground karst of the area.

== Appearance of the cavity ==
The cavity appeared violently on 23 November 1343 during a violent storm, or possibly an earthquake.

== Legends ==
The spectacular formation is at the origin of numerous legends. One of them recounts that the place was inhabited by people who lived such dissolute lives that a neighbour warned them against their sinful ways, without them taking notice. God therefore wished to punish the sinners by engulfing the hamlet, saving only the wise neighbour. The angels then threw a fragment into the sea, creating the isle of Filfla. A variant of this legend speaks of a nun as saved while praying in the small San Mattew Crypt during the occurrence.

== Chapel ==
A chapel consecrated to Saint Matthew was built on the edge of the sinkhole, and has been in existence since at least the 14th century, probably dating back to the 11th century.

== Flora and fauna ==
Dominant trees identified in this site include the laurel tree (siġra tar-rand) not too widely found in the Maltese islands; the fig tree (siġra tat-tin), the pomegranate tree (siġra tar-rummien) the carob tree (siġra tal-ħarrub), the hawthorn (siġra tal-anżalor) along with reeds (qasab) and the bramble (għollieq).

One particular species that merits special mention is the sandarac gum tree (siġra tal-għargħar) which naturally occurs in North Africa, Southern Spain, and in Malta growing only at Maqluba and Imġiebagħ and in the Mellieha area.

Under these trees other plants thrive such as the large-leafed nettle (ħurrieq) and the cleavers (ħarxajja komuni). On the sides of the Maqluba many other flora species cling to the steep rocky flanks that enclose this depression. Thus one notices the Maltese salt tree (xebb), the ivy (liedna) and the caper (kappara), but also the prickly pear (bajtra tax-xewk) and the omnipresent Bermuda buttercup (ħaxixa Ingliża) along with many other plants.

The list of fauna identified in the Maqluba is also interesting especially as some of these creatures are endemic to Malta, including a number of species of beetle, slug, types of rare ants, a rare woodlouse including the grey long-eared bats and free-tailed bats, known to inhabit this zone.

== Natural environment ==
The sinkhole is the only one in Malta that is not covered in sediment. The natural environment is protected and integrated in the list of Natura 2000 in Malta. Dense scrubland is dominated by laurel and includes the presence of Malta's national tree, Tetraclinis articulata, known in Maltese as għargħar, as well as Maltese Salsola, (Salsola melitensis), an endemic species on the archipelago. The sinkhole is also a nesting site for the national bird of Malta, the blue rock thrush (Monticola solitarius).

The site is open to visitors.
