= Filfla =

Uninhabited island in Malta

Native name: Filfa
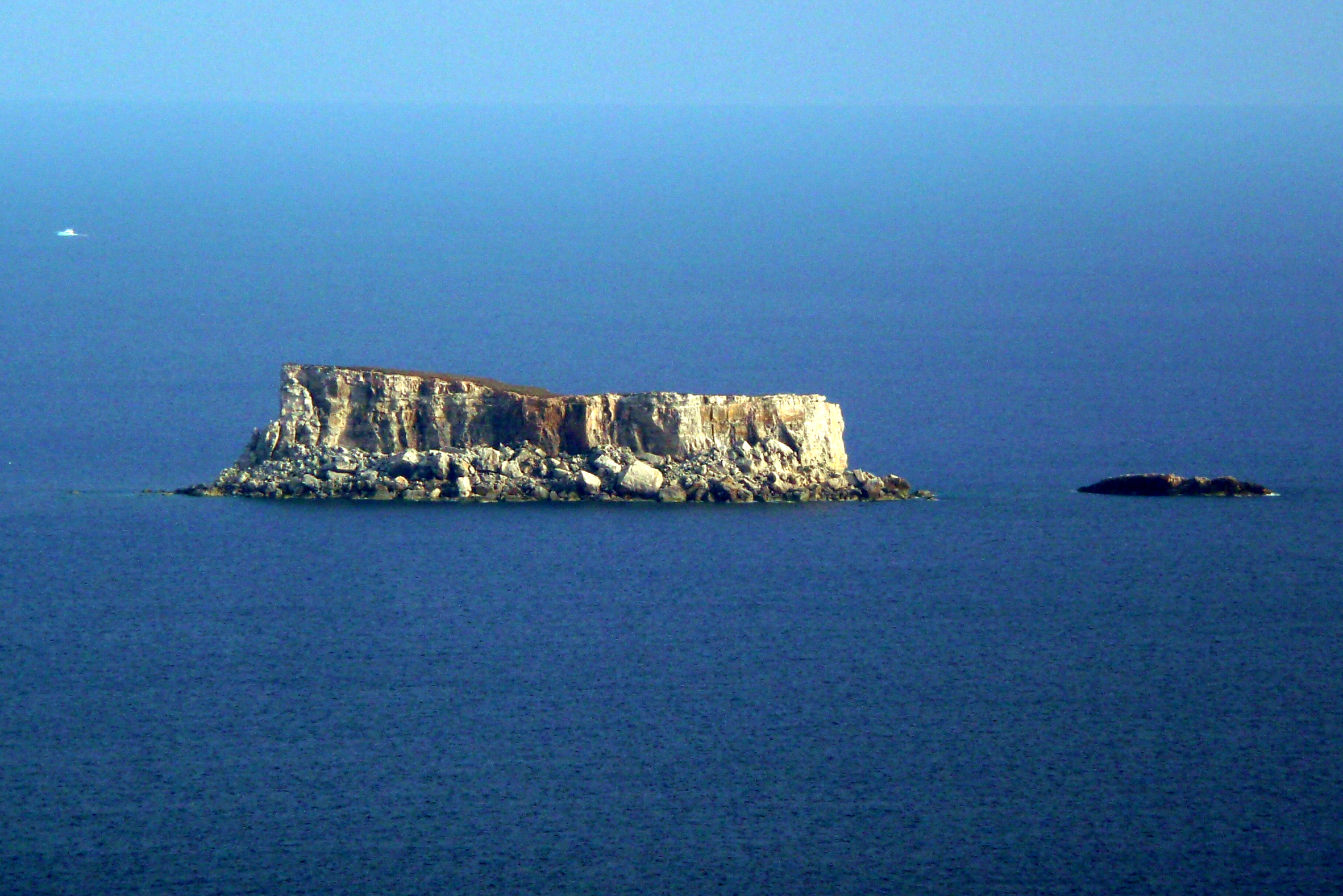
- Filfla and neighboring Filfoletta seen from Dingli Cliffs (from northwest)

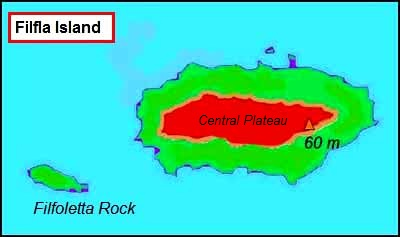
- Map of Filfla

- Location within Malta

Geography
- Location: South of Malta, Mediterranean Sea - Island Under Administration of Siġġiewi
- Coordinates: 35°47′15″N 14°24′37″E
- Archipelago: Maltese islands
- Total islands: 2
- Area: 0.06 km^{2} (0.023 sq mi)
- Highest elevation: 60 m (200 ft)

Administration
- Malta

Demographics
- Population: 0

Filfla is a mostly barren, uninhabited islet 4.5 kilometres (2 1/2 nautical miles) south of Malta, and is the most southerly point of the Maltese Archipelago. Filflett, a rocky islet some 101 metres (331 feet) southwest of Filfla, has the southernmost point of Malta. The name is believed to come from felfel, the Arabic word for peppercorn. Prior to the 17th century, nautical maps of Malta typically referred to the island as simply 'Pepper' island.

== Environment ==
Filfla has an area of 3.7282 hectares (9 7/32 acres) with a 988-metre-long (1,080-yard) coastline. It is a crumbling flat-topped limestone plateau surrounded by 60-metre-high (200 ft) cliffs. Three species of seabirds breed on the islet: the European storm petrel (with an estimated 5000–8000 pairs), Cory's shearwater (c. 200 pairs) and yellow-legged gull (c. 130 pairs). The island has been identified as an Important Bird Area (IBA) by BirdLife International, principally because of the storm petrel colony. A type of wall lizard (Podarcis filfolensis ssp. filfolensis) and door snail (Lampedusa imitatrix gattoi) are endemic to Filfla. A large wild leek, growing up to 2 m (6 ft 7 in) high, also occurs. Access to Filfla is only possible for educational or scientific purposes, subject to prior permission from the Environment and Resources Authority.

== History ==
Lone Island, also called the island of Filfla, was possibly sacred to the Neolithic inhabitants of Malta, who built the temples of Ħaġar Qim and Mnajdra on the Maltese coast opposite the islet.

The only known permanent structure on the island was a chapel built inside a cave in 1343, which was destroyed by an earthquake in 1856 that also sank part of the island. A map of Malta dating back to 1798 shows a fort, a lighthouse and a monastery with a chapel on Filfla.

Until 1971 the Royal Navy and Royal Air Force used the island for target practice, and spent cartridges from these bombardments can still be found on Filfla today. It became a bird reserve in 1980. The Filfla Natural Reserve Act, enacted in 1988, provided for further restrictions on access and use, including a prohibition on fishing within one nautical mile (1.9 km) around the island due to the possibility of encountering unexploded ordnance.

Maltese Government notice 173 of 1990 once again permitted fishing within the one-mile zone.

Filfla was invoked in a territorial dispute over the continental shelf between Libya and Malta. The case was adjudicated by the International Court of Justice in 1985 essentially by ignoring the islet from the calculations.

A substantial piece of the island was eroded during Storm Harry in January 2026, potentially threatening key seabird habitat.

== Legends ==
The creation story of Filfla is linked to the legends surrounding the formation of Il-Maqluba. Maltese legend recounts that the area that now forms Il-Maqluba was inhabited by people who lived such dissolute lives that a neighbour warned them against their sinful ways, without them taking notice. God therefore wished to punish the sinners by engulfing the hamlet, saving only the wise neighbour. Angels are then said to have thrown a fragment of the hamlet into the sea, creating the isle of Filfla.

== In films ==
Filfla served as the location of Scab Island in the 1980 film Popeye.

== See also ==
- Endemic Maltese wildlife
- Libya–Malta relations
