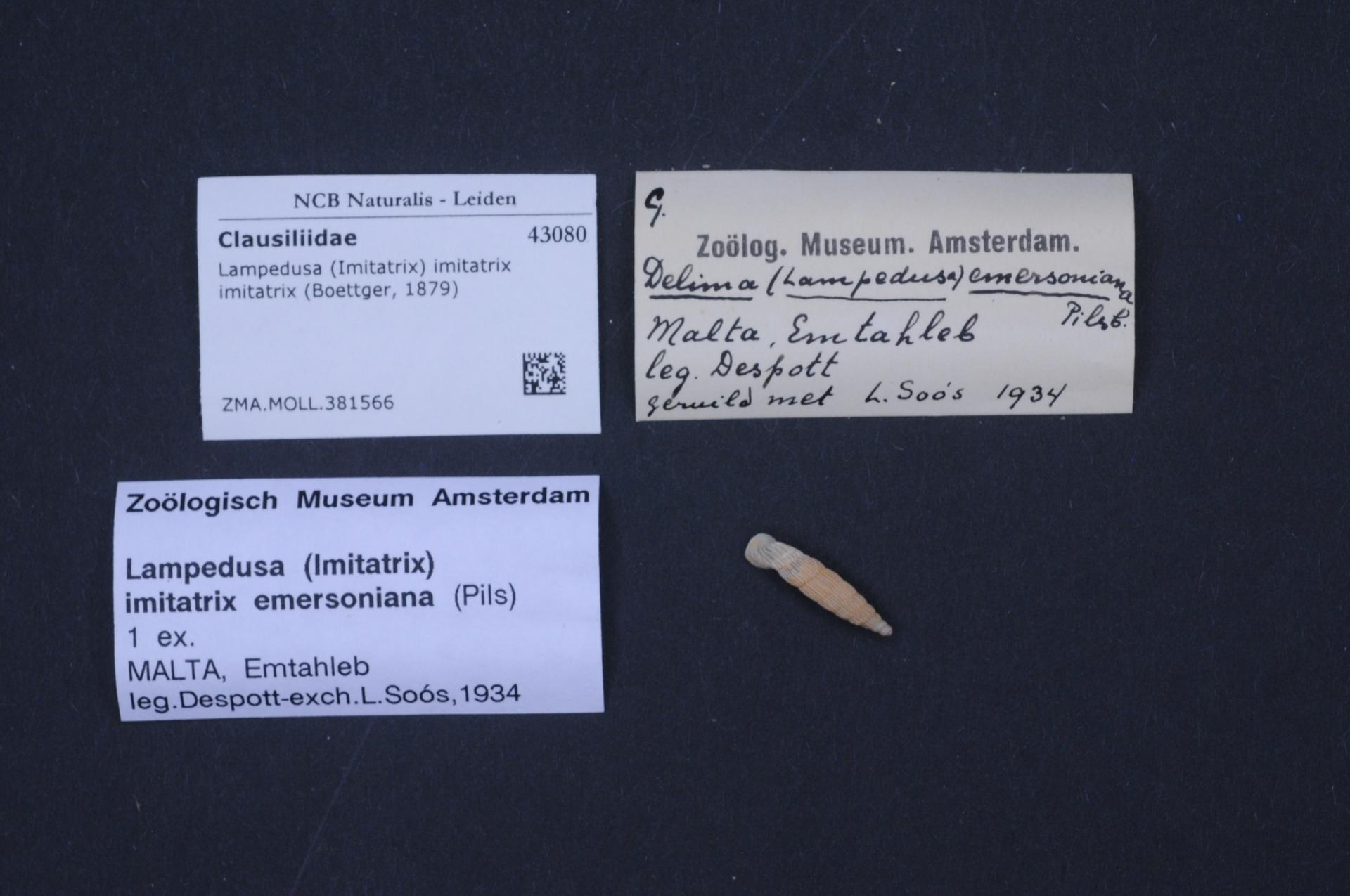
- Lampedusa imitatrix

Scientific classification
- Domain: Eukaryota
- Kingdom: Animalia
- Phylum: Mollusca
- Class: Gastropoda
- Order: Stylommatophora
- Family: Clausiliidae
- Genus: Lampedusa; Boettger, 1877

= Lampedusa (gastropod) =

Genus of gastropods

Lampedusa is a genus of small, very elongate, air-breathing land snails, terrestrial pulmonate gastropod mollusks in the family Clausiliidae, the door snails; all of which have a clausilium.

== Species ==
Species within the genus Lampedusa include:

- Lampedusa imitatrix
- Lampedusa melitensis
