= Qrendi =

Qrendi Il-Qrendi Crendi, Krendi
- Local council
- Qrendi
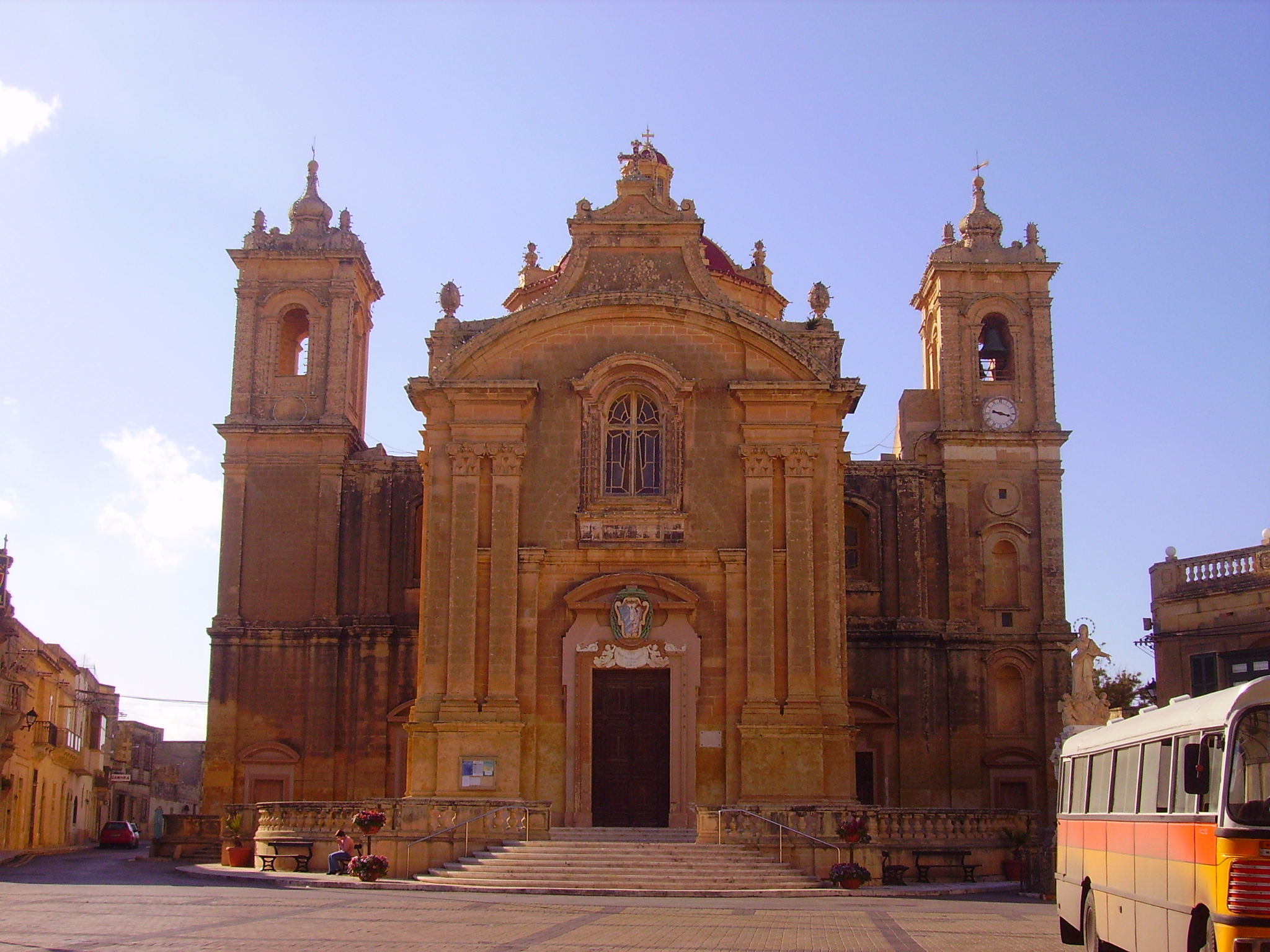
- Qrendi parish church

- Flag Coat of arms
- Motto: Tyrium Dirutas Servo Moles
- Coordinates: 35°50′3″N 14°27′32″E
- Country: Malta
- Region: Western Region
- District: South Eastern District
- Borders: Mqabba, Siġġiewi, Żurrieq

Government
  - Mayor: David Michael Schembri (PL)

Area
  - Total: 4.9 km^{2} (1.9 sq mi)

Population (Jul 2024)
  - Total: 3,324
  - Density: 680/km^{2} (1,800/sq mi)
- Demonym(s): Qrendi (m), Qrendija (f), Qrendin (pl)
- Time zone: UTC+1 (CET)
  - Summer (DST): UTC+2 (CEST)
- Postal code: QRD
- Dialing code: 356
- ISO 3166 code: MT-44
- Patron saint: Assumption of Mary; Our Lady of Lourdes
- Day of festa: 15 August (Assumption); 1st Sunday of July (Our Lady of Lourdes)
- Website: Qrendi Local Council Website

Qrendi (Maltese: Il-Qrendi) is a village in the Western Region of Malta It is located close to Mqabba, Żurrieq and Siġġiewi. Within its boundaries are the two Neolithic temples of Mnajdra and Ħaġar Qim. The population of Qrendi was 3,324 in July 2024. This included 1,714 males and 1,610 females; 2,985 Maltese nationals and 339 foreign nationals.

Two annual feasts are held in Qrendi: the feast of Our Lady of Lourdes is celebrated either on the last Sunday of June or the first Sunday of July, and the Feast of the Ascension of Our Lady on 15 August.

Although the majority of the village's old core buildings remain today, Qrendi has changed considerably in recent times. A bypass road has been built to divert through-traffic away from the village, modern suburb developments have been built and an open space with a bus terminus created in front of the Parish Church by removing the walled grounds from an old villa.

== History ==
Fossilized remains of animals dating back to the Quaternary Period have been found in the environs of Qrendi. The remains were found in caves and coastal deposits within the Magħlaq Fault or Wied tal-Magħlaq. The caves came to light in 1858, when the area began to be quarried for its hard coralline rock which was used to build the docks in the Grand Harbour.

Studies were then taken up by Commander Thomas Abel Brimage Spratt in 1861, who excavated a site known as Ħalq is-Siġar at Magħlaq and confirmed the presence of a variety of fossilised animal remains, including an abundance of hippopotami bones, evidence of dwarf elephants, giant dormice, weasels, owls, bats and birds, besides many other snail fossils. The discovery further yielded complete skeletons of elephants and a large number of bones pertaining to sea birds.

In around 3600 BC, the temples of Ħaġar Qim and Mnajdra, which are among the oldest freestanding structures in the world, were built in what is now the outskirts of Qrendi. Other ancient sites such as tombs and dolmens have also been found in the limits of Qrendi.

The first known documentation of Qrendi is in the militia list of 1417, when it was a small village of 26 households. During Hospitaller rule, various towers were built in or around Qrendi, while some knights built summer residences in the area. Qrendi became an independent parish in 1618.

In the 19th century, while Malta was a British protectorate, Qrendi was ruled by a magistrate who was known as Luogotenente, and a garden was built in Qrendi for his personal use.

During World War II, a small airstrip known as RAF Krendi was built roughly halfway between the village and Siġġiewi. The airstrip consisted of two tarmac runways, and it saw use during the Allied invasion of Sicily in 1943. The airstrip closed with the end of the war, and the runways have been converted into roads. A number of Qrendin civilians were killed during the war, and a memorial in their honour was inaugurated in 1995.

The Qrendi Local Council was established by the Local Councils Act of 1993.

== Geography ==
=== il-Maqluba ===
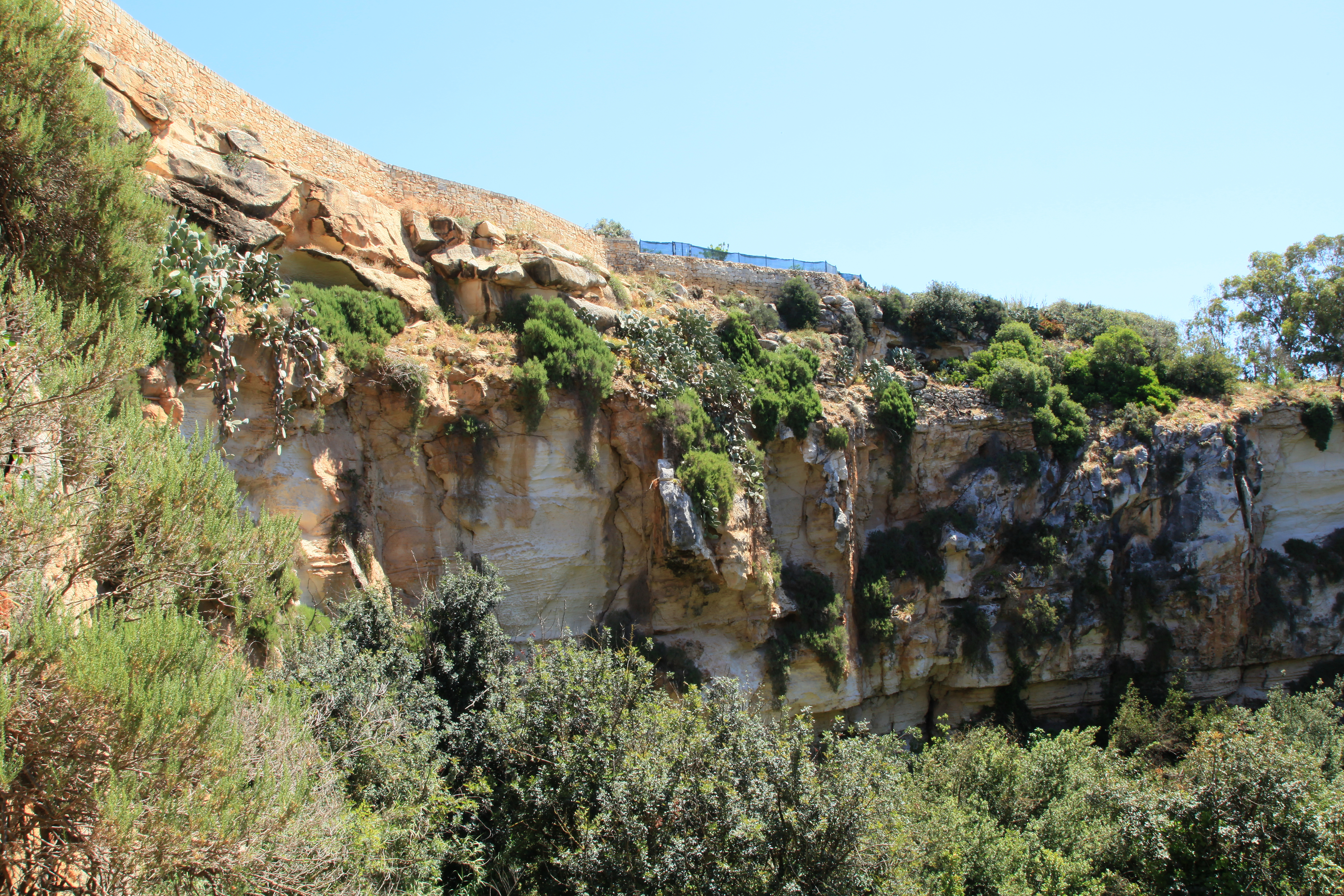
Il-Maqluba

il-Maqluba is a large sinkhole or doline that formed suddenly in 1343, that is associated with local creations legends.

=== Wied Magħlaq ===
One of the more well known valleys in Qrendi is Wied Magħlaq. It is about 2 km (1 mi) from the village and the same distance from the other valley within the locality of Qrendi, that is Wied iż-Żurrieq.

=== Wied iż-Żurrieq ===
The Wied iż-Żurrieq area is an important fishing hamlet in the region. Due to the environment and setting of this site, it has for a long time been a popular tourist and visitor attraction.

The Wied iz-Żurrieq valley begins as Wied Ħoxt which can be accessed from the panoramic road that runs from il-Ħnejja or Blue Grotto to the temples of Ħaġar Qim and descends towards the sea ending in the Wied iż-Żurrieq mouth. The valley had been cut through time in the lower coralline limestone and the result is a ragged and bare rocky landscape.

Continuing towards il-Ħnejja or the Blue Grotto a rock feature has emerged which has been titled Ġebla tiċċaqlaq (that is the moving rock). It consists of a rock hulk which looms to a height surpassing 15 metres and which is stuck firmly into the cliff face. It is said that this rock moves during violent stormy weather making strong sounds caused by these movements.

Coastal caves - such as the Reflection Cave, Filfla Cave, Cats Cave, Rotunda Cave, Honey Moon Cave and Blue Window Cave - offer underwater views of marine fauna.

=== Coastline ===
To the north of the Wied iż-Żurrieq fishing hamlet one can find other sea caves and grottoes as found on its southern sea leading to the blue grotto. The Nuffied al-Kabir and Nuffied iż-Żgħir coves, the capes of Tal-Gawwija, Rsejjen, Ħalq it-Tafal, Ras Niġnuna, Maqluba l-Baħar, Għar Mantel, and Ras il-Ħamrija are among the Qrendi landmarks that attract visitors. An incident occurred on April 17th 2026 after a 64 year old visitor from England lost his life whilst diving at Wied Iz-Zurrieq in Qrendi at approximately 3:30pm.

== Main sights ==
=== Megalithic and other ancient sites ===
==== Ħaġar Qim ====
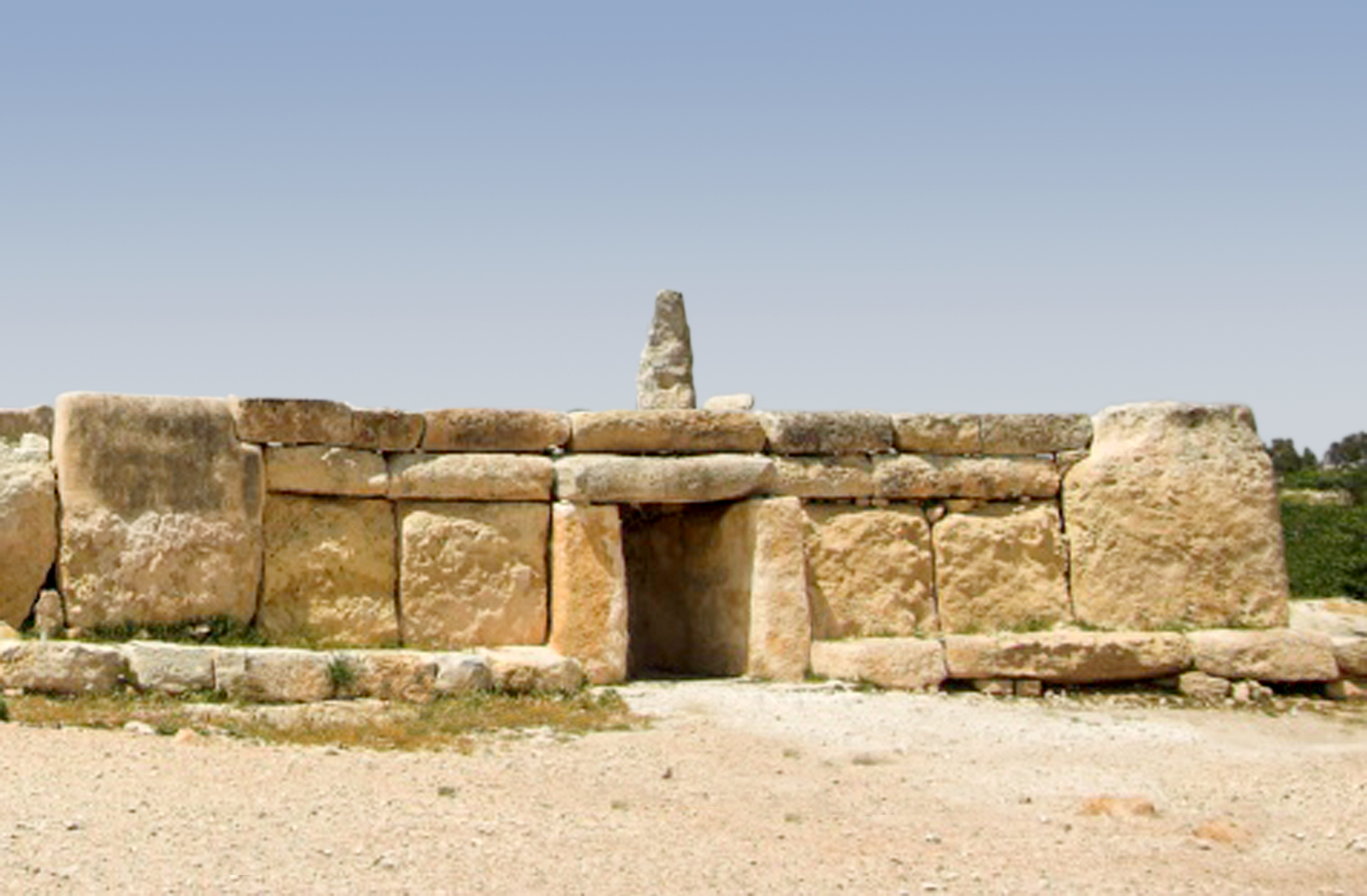
Façade of the main temple at Ħaġar Qim

People were aware of the existence of the Neolithic temples of Ħaġar Qim since many centuries back, at least from the seventeenth century. The temples date to the around 3000 B.C. though they were not built in one instance and thus their different structures span hundreds of years between them. The temples are unusual in that they are sited on the crest of a ridge when most other temples were constructed on the slope below a hilltop.

The presence of these large boulders placed in orderly fashion despite their size and weight ignited the fantasy of some and led them to interpret the site as the work of giants, following what others also believed that the island was inhabited by a race of giants who came here after the great Flood described in Genesis 2, believing that these were the descendants of Noah and who in Malta built structures such as Ħaġar Qim temples.

The mystery of these big stones jutting out of the ground began to be unravelled in the nineteenth century when excavations started in 1839.by J.G. Vance of the Royal Engineers who was requested by Governor Sir Henry Bouverie to supervise the first dig. He also put forward his opinion on these ruins saying that: "I can compare it with no other remains that I have ever seen or read of: I consider it to be quite unique and dissimilar to any discovery hitherto treated of." At the time practically nothing was known about those ruins and all Vance could do was conjecture about their origins and similarities to other temples and cultures.

Professor of Prehistoric European Archaeology and Director of the Institute of Archaeology in the University of London in the mid-twentieth century, visited the site and observed: "I have been visiting the prehistoric ruins all round the Mediterranean, from Mesopotamia to Egypt, Greece and Switzerland, but I have nowhere seen a place as old as this one."

The Ħaġar Qim site is composed of a number of structures consisting of a central building, two smaller ones on the sides and the remaining parts of a third building. The main temple was presumably built in successive stages during the fourth millennium B.C. It thus developed into an irregular and complex ground plan. Its monumental façade has become a famous and iconic feature and faces the south-east. Of particular note are the large megaliths that shape the outer wall and which are pieced by an entrance in the middle formed of a trilithon structure, which, in turn, leads to a number of chambers.

The temple complex has many other interesting features which make the adjacent museum and inside environment enticing to discover, that include stone altars, the mystic oracle hole, two stumps of legs possibly of 'Mother Goddess' figures, as well as the discovery of a small clay figurine depicting a woman after having given birth termed as, "The Venus of Malta", and a small floral engraved stone altar.

==== Mnajdra ====
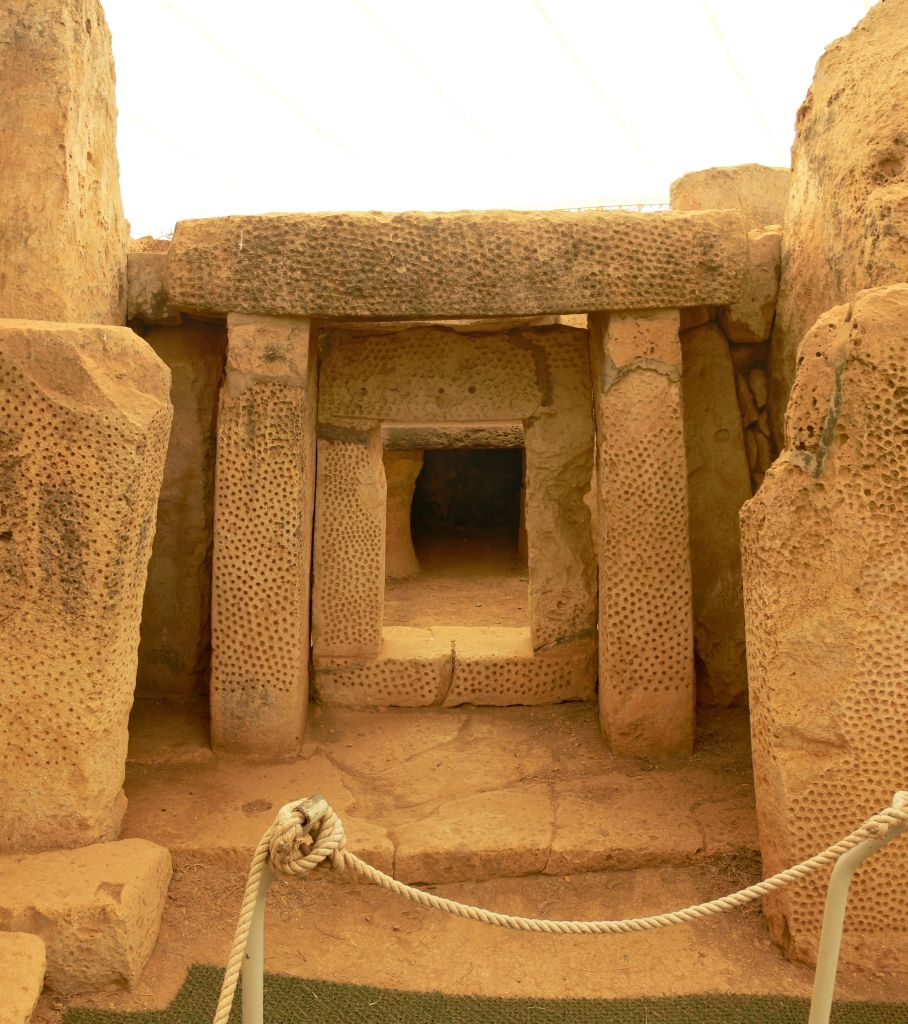
Niche at the Mnajdra south temple

On leaving the Ħaġar Qim complex, going in a western direction, one can walk down a modern-day paved path and 500 meters away comes face to face with the Mnajdra complex of temples. This site differs in some ways from the other temple just visited.

Mnajdra is largely constructed from coralline limestone quarried from the area giving the temples a much more rugged, and rather bluish appearance, a result of this hard stone – much different from the yellowish and much softer globigerina limestone predominant in the zone where Ħaġar Qim stands and of which it was built.

The Mnajdra structures are sited towards the edge of the promontory facing Filfa – the islet which pops out of the water a short distance away and separated from the mainland by the blue sea so predominant in this area, and is "probably the most atmospheric all the temples"; as it is tucked into a hollow of the cliffs and surrounded by the natural and marine environment.

The temple complex is composed of three separate buildings, each of which can be entered from a common forecourt, and is an experience going round the temples and its various interior apses that form the different structures. Visitors are stricken with the neatness and regularity of the first course of orthostatic slabs which go round the apses of the middle temple, added to the precision one cannot but notice also the lower than usual size of this first course which barely reaches one meter in height.

A unique feature is a small Bas relief engraving of the roofed façade of a temple which is featured on the largest upright slab to the left of the inner passage of this same temple, amongst other features such as a decorated niche, the 'oracle' holes in the lower temple, and a number of pillar altars in the two bigger temples.

A particular aspect which is connected with these temples is their relationship with astronomy. It is strongly believed that the Neolithic temples were also oriented to follow the movements of the sun. The Summer Solstice and the Winter Solstice as well as the two equinoxes enter into and hit the two major Mnajdra temples indicating that the temple builders aligned the structures according to the ray of light from the sun reflected on these particular days of the year.

Ħaġar Qim too has its own alignment which seems to be linked to the Summer Solstice.

==== The Misqa Tanks ====
The human activity in the area is complemented by a series of holes grouped together in a zone about 250 meters north of Mnajdra temples. The explanation for the presence of these cavities is not a straightforward conclusion, but seems plausible that they were dug there for the collection and maintaining of a secure reservoir of fresh water. Yet to date them is not easy as no datable deposits remain due to these tanks having been cleared many times along the years.

These tanks are situated on the top of the Magħlaq plateau. Their name – il-Misqa has been attributed to the watering place. The eight tanks are bell-shaped and have openings through which the water can be accessed, but share no regular shape. Most openings were closed with an intrigue formation of heavy stone interlocking slabs, whilst one has a round hole in the capping slab allowing water to be drawn through.

The tanks were cut into a section of rock whose composition allowed the reservoirs to form and retain water. Rainwater collection culverts channel runoff into the tanks, providing them with a continuous water supply.

==== Misraħ is-Sinjura dolmen ====
A further reminder of the early times when human beings roamed the area around Qrendi is a dolmen which is found in Misraħ Sinjura or Misraħ is-Sinjura from where it took its name. Dolmens are dated to the Bronze Age, that is, to around 2500-1500 B.C. or the Tarxien Cemetery phase.

Dolmens are one of the most common megalithic structures found in many parts of the world, and consist of a stone slab placed horizontally over two or more upright stones, serving as a capstone.

The Qrendi dolmen, which may have served as a burial chamber is described as having a capstone which is appreciably larger – 4.4m by 3.8m – supported on a four course irregular dry stone walling.

A feature catching one's attention is a groove cut round its perimeter piercing the capping slab by a hole that may have served for religious rituals in the past.

The dolmen at Misraħ Sinjura is also known among the locals as il-Ħaġra l-Imsaqqfa (the roofed stone).

=== Churches and chapels ===
Within the Qrendi countryside one can find the Maqluba doline, an enormous sinkhole that occurred during a storm in 1343. According to legend a small chapel existed at the time, which must make it one of the oldest surviving Christian buildings in Malta.

There are seven other churches and chapels in the parish, most of them constructed on the site of earlier structures. The first parish was set up in 1436, when the village was within Żurrieq's parish. Qrendi became a separate parish in 1618.

The ornate baroque Parish Church, designed by Lorenzo Gafà the architect of Mdina Cathedral, was completed in 1720.

Chapels in Qrendi include San Mattew tal-Maqluba, San Mattew iż-Żgħir, Madonna tal-Ħniena, Madonna tal-Grazzja, Santa Katerina, Is-Salvatur.

==== Parish church ====
While Qrendi formed part of the parish of Żurrieq, in 1575 its main church was dedicated to the Nativity of Our Lady. Sometime later, in the year 1594, it was however rebuilt by the people of the village and was rededicated to the Assumption of the Virgin Mary.

During second pastoral visit of Mgr Baldassare Cagliares, this Bishop declared Qrendi a separate parish, uniting to it the two small communities of Ħal Lew and Ħal Manin. This dismemberment took place on 15 February 1618 with the consent of Rev. Nicola Bonnici, the parish priest of Żurrieq

As many times happened, a few years after a parish was erected, the church identified to serve as the parish church became inadequate for the daily religious needs of the parishioners as these began to grow in number. This created the need for modification, enlargement or replacement of the original church, when, Rev. GioMaria Camilleri thought of building a new church. The site chosen was the land on which two small churches stood next to each other, one dedicated to the Assumption of Our Lady and the other to St. Anthony.

The work on the new parish church started in 1620, and with the contribution of the community the construction was concluded thirty-five years later, that is in 1655.

While the church was still being built a pastoral visit took place. It was Mgr Balageur Camarasa who, following his consecration as Bishop of Malta in February 1636, visited Qrendi, and who then examined the parish church and its altars. The sacristy was already erected whilst he church had three doors and there seemed to be a plan to enlarge the building.

The building of the parish church continued when in 1668 work started on the belfry known as 'Tal-Agunija' (Agony), which took eleven years to complete. Thus by 1679, and during the administration of the parish priest Rev. Marco Bellia, the parish church was ready and the parishioners could enjoy their new completed church.

With the advent of Rev. Domenico Formosa, a native of Qrendi, the parish church was thus once again demolished so that a more spacious edifice could be built. The plan for the new church was the work of the highly experienced and able Lorenzo Gafà. other persons who fell under the authority of the Inquisitor, and the members of all the Religious Orders.

Don Domenico appears to have been quite an inspiration to his parishioners, maybe also because they saw in him a native of their village and one from their community. His zeal moved the villagers to give their contribution to the construction of the church which began in 1685 and continued until 1691, stopping for a number of years and then resuming in 1695. According to Ferres, who was writing in the mid-nineteenth century, the sacrifices made by the Qrendin to build their church were without comparison in the history of the Maltese Church. One example of extreme sacrifice was the parish priest himself. According to Ferres it was on 17 January 1699 that Don Domenico wishing to encourage his parishioners to do more towards the construction of the church thought of lending a hand so as to lead by example. He thus grasped a stone, put it on his shoulder, and thus burdened climbed up a long ladder. On reaching the top, while Don Domenico was stepping on a plank of the scaffolding he tripped and fell to the ground dying on the spot – a victim of his remarkable zeal. Work continued and the edifice was complete in 1712.

The church is in the form of a Latin cross, following the general rule of church design found in the majority of churches in Malta. It thus comprises a choir, two transepts, a central nave and two sacristies. While the edifice was still under construction, parish priest Rev. Pietro Zerafa, who took over the administration of Qrendi in 1701, ordered the dismantling of part of the already built structure to enlarge the church. A later addition is the sacristy which stands to the left of the choir; this was added in the nineteenth century on the initiative of Rev. Dr Celestino Camilleri who managed to raise a good sum of money for its erection. The work was done in 1865.

The Gafà church is 34.44 metres long; the nave is 7.01 metres wide while it measures 23.16 metres from transept to transept. It has ten altars, an elegant dome, and two belfries, one on each side of the façade. It was consecrated by Bishop Fra Vincenzo Labini on 13 October 1782 during the tenure of office of Rev. Antonio Mizzi – a hard-working and highly loved parish priest. The works done by this priest comprise two out of the four bells that hung in the church's belfries.

With the Gafà church in full function the parish priests who were appointed to administer the parish now saw to it to add necessary facilities and to embellish the parish church. Thus the parish priest Rev. Pietro Paolo Xuereb D.D. commissioned the artist Giuseppe Calleja to decorate the dome, the ceiling and the main pilasters of the church. In 1971, on the initiative of the parish priest Rev. Karm Attard, the ceiling and dome were redecorated. with episodes from the life of the Blessed virgin as commissioned to renowned artist Pawlu Camilleri Cauchi.

From its establishment as a parish Qrendi's patron saint has been the Assumption of Our Lady. In the parish church there are three paintings depicting the Assumption. The current titular painting was commissioned in 1917 to the renowned artist Giuseppe Calì and replaced the one that hung on the main altar, the work of Rocco Buhagiar

The Qrendi parish church has two sacristies. One of them, known as the sacristy of the priests, holds the old titular painting of the Assumption of the Madonna done by Rocco Buhagiar in the 18th century. A plaque on the wall commemorates the consecration of the church by Bishop Mgr Labini in 1782. There is also a small chapel adjacent to the sacristy, which also holds some interesting works of art. Among these is the first statue of the Immaculate Conception used for the Marian celebrations in Qrendi. The other sacristy, which is locally known as that of the confreres, holds a portrait of Rev. Celestino Camilleri who brought to Qrendi the remains of St. Celestino and who also did the floor of the main altar in 1882. There is also a statue by Karlu Darmanin that represents St. Philip Neri and which was in the past carried during the procession of Our Lady of Lourdes.

Similar to other parish churches that have been long established, the church of Qrendi possesses a number of statues besides the titular. One such is that of Our Lady of Sorrows which was done by Wistin (Agostino) Camilleri and is a work in papier-mâché of 1972. The statue of Our Lady of the Girdle (Consolation) is by Karlu Darmanin and is connected to its Confraternity. Darmanin also completed the statue of Our Lady of Lourdes in 1878, made of papier-mâché, twenty years after the apparitions at Lourdes. The statue of Our Lady of the Holy Rosary is the work of Carmelo Mallia known as 'Il-Lhudi' and is associated to the Confraternity of the Holy Rosary of Qrendi.

The Qrendin felt the need to have a titular statue representing the Assumption. For this new statue they contracted the sculptor Antonio Chircop from Senglea.

The statue depicted the Madonna in a pose in which the position of the arms was unique. The rich colours signify the human and the divine. It was completed in 1837.

==== Chapel of Our Lady of Mercy ====
The old chapel which stood on the same site of the present chapel dedicated to Our Lady of Mercy goes back to medieval times. Situated in the old casale of Leu (Leo or Ħal Lew), the first chapel is thought to have originated in the thirteenth century. It also served as vice-parish when the Qrendi area still formed part of the parish of Żurrieq. Though Mgr Pietro Dusina profaned this chapel when he visited Ħal Lew in 1575, it seems that the building was rehabilitated as indicated from the pastoral visit of Bishop Cagliares of 1621. In a later pastoral visit, this time by Bishop Balaguer which took place in 1636, we get a better description of the medieval structure

The present baroque chapel was built between 1650 and 1668, and is considered an architectural jewel. It is accredited to architect Mederico Blondel (active in Malta in the second half of the 17th century). The baroque touches are seen in all their strength in the main altar which is adorned with stone carvings. The titular painting which dates to the 17th century shows the Virgin of Mercy who is seated on the clouds and a moon while holding the child Christ who is standing on her knee. This piece of art was attributed to Giuseppe d'Arena, an Italian painter who was active in Malta and was connected to the circle of Mattia Preti. However Prof. Keith Sciberras more recently ascribed it to Filippino Dingli

The style of the chapel followed the common Latin cross design of Christian churches. According to Ferres this sanctuary attracted so many devotees that it ranked second in the number of visits after that of Mellieha. The church was thought important enough to attract also a number of benefactors such as Bailiff Fra Philipp-Wolfgang Gutenberg who donated various paintings and other objects to this church

The continuous flow of the faithful to this church, some of them tired after their long and strenuous journey, needed to be addressed. Thus a well was dug in the church parvis in 1670 so that the faithful could quench their thirst and give water to their beasts of burden when their arrived at the sanctuary. In the 19th century a puteal or wellhead was constructed and which still bears the date '1873'. Two years after the completion of the well, in 1672, a portico was constructed so that the pilgrims could shelter from inclement weather and the heat of the sun. The contractor of this portico was the same procurator of the church, that is, Giovanni Schembri.

Many came to this church to leave evidence of the graces received and this is testified by the ex-voto paintings which were hung here.

In this church there were a number of paintings but two of these presented rather unusual subjects. One represented the seven mortal or cardinal sins – wrath, avarice, sloth, pride, lust, envy and gluttony. This painter depicted a donkey burdened with a number of baskets filled with vices. Each basket had inscribed upon it the particular sin. The donkey symbolises Satan drawn in a very ugly form while on the left of the picture one notes a man in confession

The other painting collects within it 14 saint protectors who were invoked in cases of disease and peril: St. Blaise (throat diseases), St. George (diseases of the skin), St. Erasmus (diseases of the bowels), St. Pantaleon (tuberculosis), St. Vitus (St. Vitus dance and poisonous bites), St. Christopher (travel and storms) St. Dionysius (possession by evil spirits), St. Ciriacus (eye diseases), St. Acacius (diseases of the head), St. Eustachius (burns), St. Giles (lunacy and the evil eye), St. Margaret (kidney diseases and childbirth), St. Barbara (lightning and sudden death), St. Catherine (dying people)

==== Chapel of St. Matthew ====
This chapel is linked to the landscape and the legend that is tied to it – that is il-Maqluba. Strictly speaking there are two chapels dedicated to this same saint. One is very old and may be one of the first chapels erected after the Muslim domination of Malta. This chapel can be better described as a crypt, has a window that gives onto the land depression of il-Maqluba.

The newer San Mattew church was initiated in 1674 and was completed in 1682. It was blessed by the Qrendi parish priest Rev. Domenico Formosa. The church is quite spacious and has a single altar. The titular painting done in 1688 by a member of the school or a follower of Mattia Preti and which is today attributed to Giuseppe d'Arena who had close connections to Preti, represents the martyrdom of St. Matthew and had been commissioned by the French Knight Commendatore Nicolò Communette

St. Matthew fell victim to the Axis bombing during World War Two when on 12 April 1942 it had its façade and other parts blown out. After the war it was reconstructed on a new design. The new façade has two belfries instead of the original single bellcote.

==== Chapel of Our Saviour ====
The first chapel on this site goes back many centuries. In his report, Mgr Dusina described the early chapel as having one altar but was very bare, with no income and hence no rector.

It was then in 1658 that a new chapel on the same site was erected at the expense of Beneditto Camilleri. A benefactor of this second chapel was Rev. Ġalanton Camilleri who left a good amount of money for the celebration of Mass and the singing of vespers on the feast day.

==== Chapel of St. Catherine tat-Torba ====
This chapel is commonly known as 'Tat-Torba', is sited on the outskirts of the village and was commonly known as 'Ta' bieb taż-Żejtunija' – due to the connection of St. Catherine with Zejtun. Mgr Dusina visited the original chapel during his 1575 visit. Some years later it was deconsecrated and instead of the chapel a stone cross was erected in 1624. Benedittu Camilleri decided to build a second chapel with the same dedication some distance away in 1626. Camilleri also left beneficiaries in favour of this chapel known as 'ta' Wied il-Ħofra'

==== Chapel of St. Anne ====
A votive chapel built in thanksgiving for safe deliverance from the Turkish siege of Malta of 1565. The original chapel dedicated to the Nativity of Our Lady was built by Giovanni Schembri to fulfil his vow as also documented in the acts of Notary Giuliano Briffa of 7 September 1565.

The present chapel exhibits three windows in the façade, inside there is a main altar dedicated to St. Anne which is flanked by two small side altars. The prospective that surrounds the titular painting is finely decorated. At the top of the altar is a representation of the Holy Ghost.

The interior also exhibits a number of ex-voto silver icons representing the 'newly born' and various 'illness' symbols indicating that this chapel was devotionally sought by those in need.

==== Chapel of Our Lady of Grace ====
This chapel was first dedicated to Our Lady of Victory, and was built by Angelo Spiteri from Qrendi in 1658. Spiteri left funds which were to be used for the singing of vespers and the celebration of Mass on the feast day

The present chapel has a simple façade with no decoration except for three square windows – one on each side of the door and the third one high up above it. On the very top of the church there is a small stone crucifix. The two side windows have a kneeling block for the faithful who wished to pray even when the chapel was closed. The inside is void of decoration and has only one altar.

=== Towers ===
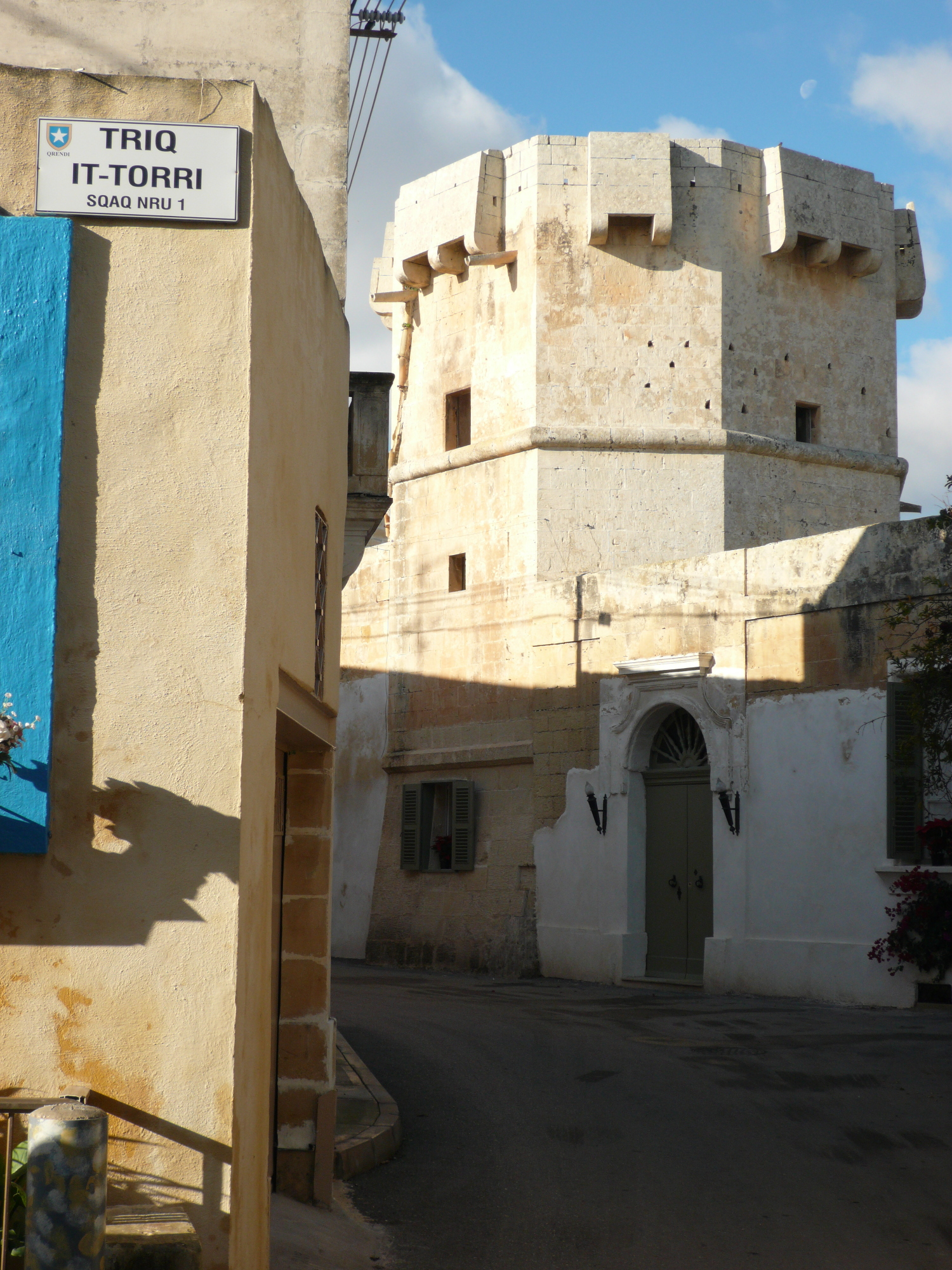
Cavalier Tower

The village of Qrendi was prone to attacks from the sea, and raids by the Ottomans or Barbary corsairs were common up to the early 17th century. Due to this, several towers were built in or around Qrendi:

- Cavalier Tower – This was built either in the 16th or 17th century by the Order of St. John, or earlier on in the medieval period. The tower is octagonal and is unique in the Maltese islands.
- Sciuta Tower – This was built in 1638, and is one of the Lascaris towers. Its design served as the prototype for the later De Redin towers. The tower was used for military purposes until World War II, and was later converted into a police station. Plans are now being made to restore the tower.
- Ħamrija Tower – This was built in 1659, and is one of 13 De Redin towers around Malta's coastline. It is situated in the vicinity of the prehistoric temples of Ħaġar Qim and Mnajdra.

=== Other notable buildings and structures ===
==== Guttenberg Palace ====
One prominent member of the Order of St. John who chose Qrendi for one of his places of retreat was Fra Philipp-Wolfgang von Guttenberg Guttenberg's fortified house was built in the Ħal Lew area and is sited on the left-hand side of the street as one enters the square in front of the sanctuary dedicated to Our Lady of Mercy. Guttenberg was aware that Qrendi was rather exposed and could easily be attacked by an invading force of corsairs at any time. For this reason he made sure that his palatial house could also be defended if the need arose. The building thus included features which helped its residents to defend themselves such as the drop boxes through which objects and harmful liquids could be dropped on attackers who were close to the walls of the house.

==== Guarena Palace ====
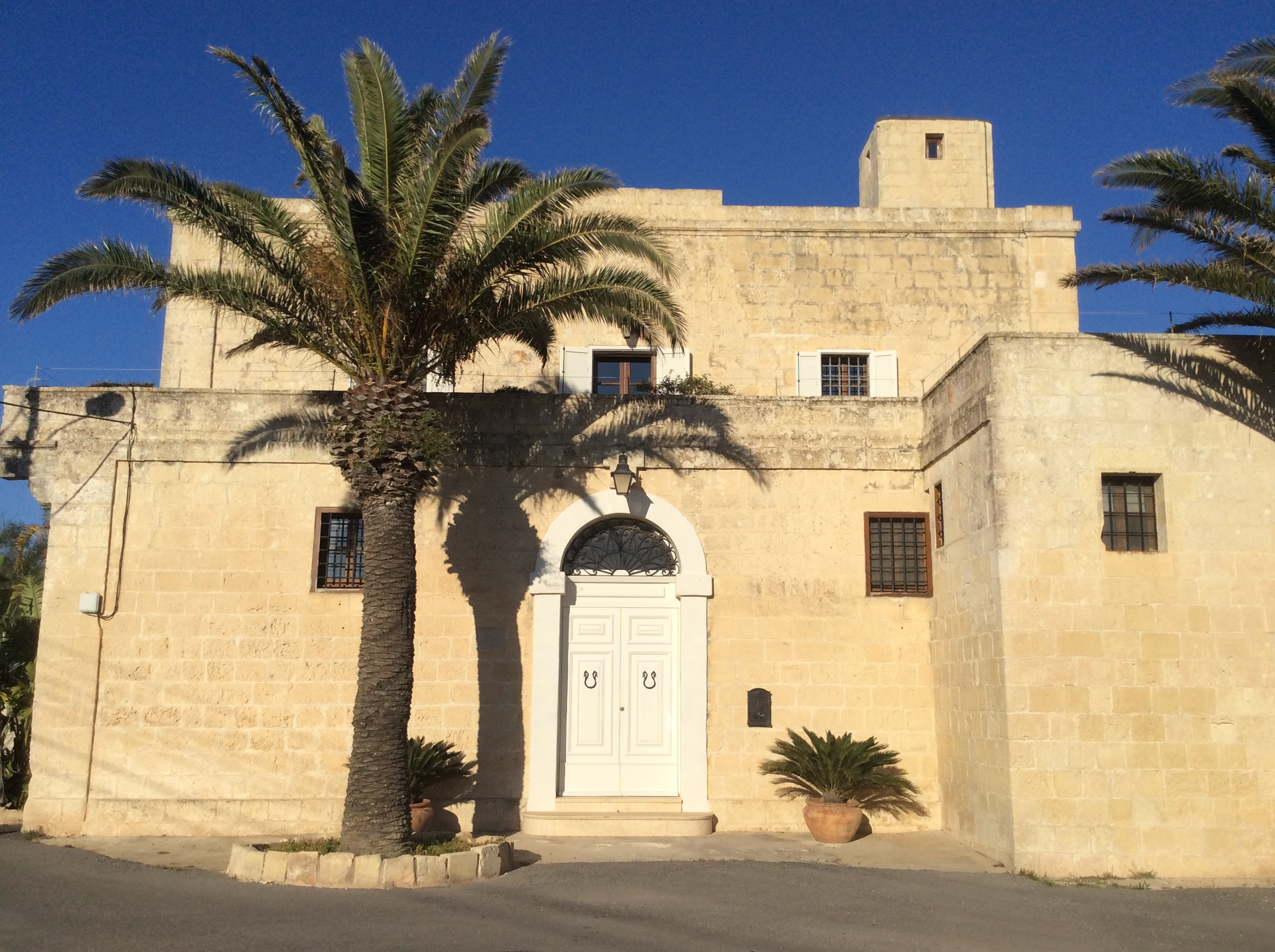
Guarena Palace

The defensive dwelling was formerly owned by the Bailiff Fra Pietro Francesco Rovero De Guarena and is situated on the road leading to the temples of Ħagar Qim after passing the small chapel dedicated to Our Lady of Graces. The architecture is rather austere as it misses any elaborate decoration. Not meant as a status of beauty and wealth but rather to serve as a residence offering a measure of protection and defence from any eventual attack from unexpected sea raiders in the Qrendi area.

The defensive structure is easily detected from the windows placed high in the walls of the ground floor while the turret on the roof served as a lookout post. The land which Guarena purchased in the mid-eighteenth century was indicated as 'kontrada tal-Grazzja'. Besides the house, this Piedmontese knight born in 1679, also included a garden in which he planted ornamental and fruit trees.

Guarena, admitted into the Order of St. John in 1688 while still a minor, had a successful career holding many high offices. He was an important benefactor who partially financed the silver screen that was put up to enclose what today is the chapel of the Blessed Sacrament in St. John's Co-Cathedral and which during Guarena's time was dedicated to Our Lady of Philermos in the Order's Conventual Church.

==== Santa Katerina Windmill ====
Located on the outskirts of Qrendi the Santa Katerina windmill can trace its origins to the period of the Knights of St. John. In 1683 Mikiel di Giovanni who at that time rented all the windmills that had been built by the Fondazione Cotoner, petitioned the government to build another three windmills, one each for Qrendi, Mqabba and Rabat.

In his request he pointed out that the residents of these localities had asked for a windmill to be built to serve their needs. This plea was granted and the Qrendi windmill was built in 1686. For the first five years it was rented to the same di Giovanni alternating with Domenico Grixti of Żurrieq, Ġużeppi Caruana of Luqa and Mikiel Micallef of Lija.

The windmill of Qrendi did not cease its operation as a grain mill with the termination of the Order's rule in Malta, as it still had more than a century of grinding to perform

==== Ġnien tal-Kmand ====
In the first decade of British rule while Sir Alexander Ball was Civil Commissioner (1802-1809), it was decided to erect a number of gardens around Malta named Ġnien tal-Kmand, whose original aim was to increase the greenery of the islands but the same gardens became also experimental agricultural centres.

In them a number of new crops and agricultural practices were tested but it seems that little benefit was eventually extracted except for the potato crop which would in later years become an important export product and a popular food item in the Maltese kitchen and also very much associated with Qrendi.

The garden had a variety of trees divided namely into fruit and citrus trees. Including mulberry trees (ċawsli), plum trees (għajnbaqar), apricot tree (berquqa), almond tree (lewża), pear trees (lanġas), vines (dwieli), fig trees (tin), prickly pears (bajtar tax-xewk), pomegranate trees (rummien), apple trees (tuffieħ ta' Belludja), peach trees (ħawħ), and quince trees (sfarġel). The citrus family was represented by orange trees (larinġ), lemon trees (lumi), tangerine trees (mandolin), and sweet lime trees (lumiċell). The abundance of trees and fruit in this garden showed how fertile and productive it must have been.

The Qrendi Ġnien tal-Kmand as were the others around Malta, was put at the disposition of the village luogotenente or Mayor for his use and enjoyment.

==== Congreve Memorial ====
A memorial to Sir Walter Congreve is located on the coastline, close to Ħamrija Tower and Mnajdra. Congreve was British officer who was awarded the Victoria Cross in 1899 for his gallantry during the Second Boer War, and he later served as Governor of Malta from 1924 to 1927. He died in Malta, and was buried at sea in the channel between Filfla and Malta. The memorial was built nearby in his honour.

==== Qrendi cemetery ====
In all the parishes of Malta and Gozo, in the past the dead were buried in the church, its crypt or in cemeteries very close to a church or chapel. With time the practice of burying in the precincts of a church began to give way to that of interring the dead in cemeteries As the adverse conditions created by the graves were causing so much discomfort, it was thought that the time had come to build a cemetery in line with what many other parishes had done already.

Obtaining the permission of both the Church and the State, called on the Qrendin to give their voluntary work towards the creation of this cemetery. The cemetery was completed and as from the beginning of 1953 no more burials were carried out in the parish church.

==== Tal-Ars Cemetery ====
Situated on the Qrendi periphery, exactly on Mqabba to Żurrieq road, one comes across the second cemetery in Qrendi, better known at the "tal-Ars" cemetery. The exact date of the construction of the cemetery is unknown but graffiti on one of its wall reads 1830. With the cemetery built to receive the dearly departed who had died from infectious diseases within the Qrendi and Mqabba communities.

The earliest Qrendi recorded burial at the Tal-Ghars Cemetery is that of Heinnyma Bugeja in 1877 aged 3 years, whilst the most recent is that of M'Concetta Bugeja in 1948 aged 42 years.

The youngest of the one hundred and forty four Qrendi Arecorded burials is that of Carmel Debono in 1882 recorded as a Baby presumably dying at birth, and that of Alphridus Briffa in 1940 aged one month, whilst the oldest burial is that of M'Anna Dimech in 1940 aged 85 years.

== Economy ==
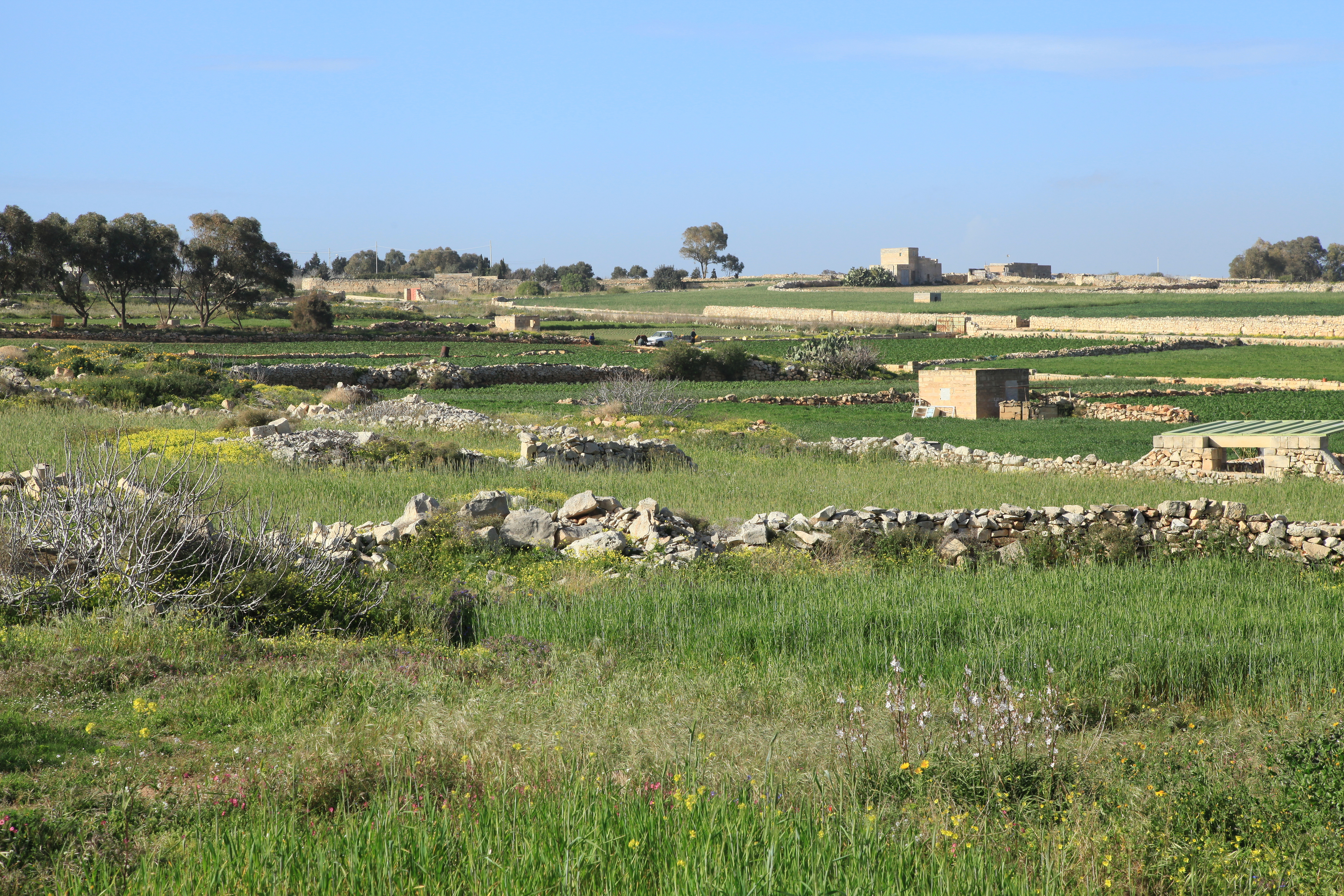
Agriculture was an important part of Qrendi's economy

Until the 20th century, most of the people in Qrendi worked as farmers or fishermen, or in the limestone quarries around the village.

Limestone quarries are still an important part of Qrendi's economy, since limestone is one of Malta's few natural resources. Limestone has been used for the construction of houses and other buildings for centuries, and it was also used to build rubble walls in fields. The quarries around Qrendi employed both Qrendin as well as people from nearby villages, and the rocks were cut either manually using simple tools, or by using gunpowder.

== Education ==
Since the introduction of the Colleges system, the Qrendi Primary School has formed part of St. Benedict's College. The college also includes the primary schools of Birżebbuġa, Għaxaq, Gudja, Kirkop, Mqabba, Safi and Żurrieq.

Since 1992, Qrendi also hosted the Helen Keller Resource Centre, an education centre catering for students aged between 12 and 22 who have particular impairments.

== Culture ==
=== Feasts ===
Qrendi celebrates two traditional festas. The feast of the Assumption of Mary is celebrated on 15 August, while the feast of Our Lady of Lourdes is celebrated on the first week in July. Both feasts are popular due to the religious manifestations, band marches, and firework displays.

=== Band clubs ===
There are two band clubs in Qrendi: the Saint Mary's Band and the Lourdes Band. They play during village's feast period, as well as prepare the fireworks, elaborate decorations and entertainment for the festivities, and play a central role in Qrendi's society and culture.

==== Saint Mary's Musical Society ====
Saint Mary's Musical Society was founded on 1 June 1908, as 'Circolo Maria Assunta' by a group of people who felt that Qrendi's main feast wasn't being celebrated how it should be. The society was first formed in Parish Street in a building adjacent to the Parish Church. Since then the society moved along numerous buildings in the centre of Qrendi, they are now located in a prominent building in the Main Qrendi Square. Today the society is known mostly for its spectacular firework displays.

==== Lourdes Philharmonic Society ====
The Lourdes Philarmonic Society was formed in 1895 as 'Casino Lourdes' and later on was given the right to host the annual feast of Our Lady of Lourdes. The society went through difficult times in between 1900 and 1910 when it went dormant and even had parts of it suspended for some time. After a later suspension the society was allowed to celebrate their feast again in 1958 and fully in 1964. Their club is located in the main building in Saint Mary's Square. Alongside their neighbours, they are well known for their pyrotechnic displays.

=== Firework factories ===
Three fireworks factories could be found in Qrendi. Two of these factories are properties of the local band clubs, Lourdes Fireworks Factory and St. Mary's Fireworks Factory. Both factories produce their annual displays in July and August respectively during the feasts of Our Lady of Lourdes and the Assumption of St. Mary. These displays are well known by Maltese and foreign fireworks enthusiasts and are done on a voluntary basis. The third factory, the Ellul Fireworks Factory, is a commercial fireworks factory.

Both Lourdes Fireworks Factory and St. Mary's Fireworks Factory have participated and won local fireworks festivals. In 2011, Lourdes Fireworks Factory were the winners of the Malta Fireworks Festival. In 2015, Lourdes Fireworks Factory were declared winners of both the Malta Fireworks Festival and the Malta International Fireworks Festival. Also in 2015, St. Mary's Fireworks Factory won the Mechanised Ground Fireworks Festival.

==== Accidents ====
Both factories has been involved in a number of accidents during its existence, which has cost the lives of five people.

During the 1950s, an explosion at the Lourdes Fireworks Factory killed one worker and injured another, which caused the buildings to close. It was eventually reopened in another building on 11 November 1976. Albert Bondin, injured in a fireworks incident while manufacturing fireworks on 12 October 2005, died in hospital on 21 October 2005 due to the serious injuries that he suffered.

On 22 May 1972, an explosion at Saint Mary's Fireworks Factory occurred which killed local villager John Falzon. This prompted plans and preparations for a new, more modern factory to be built, which began in September that year. On 10 February 1974, another terrible accident occurred when Emanuel Aquilina, Martin Mallia and Jack Bugeja died whilst manufacturing some fireworks. In the midst of this latest disaster for the Society the joy of Qrendi's firework production turned became monotonous and emotional. On 7 July 2012, Joseph Mifsud succumbed to injuries after he suffered burns in an accident on 29 May 2012.

=== Other groups or associations ===
The Qrendi Scout Group was first founded in 1932, but it became dormant in 1956 and it was formally disbanded in 1965. The group was reestablished in 1995, and its members now participate in local, national and international events.

The Society of Christian Doctrine teaches Christian doctrine to children after schooling hours, at the MUSEUM religious centre as well as in the Pastoral Centre.

== Notable people ==
- Julia Farrugia Portelli, politician and Minister for Tourism and Consumer Protection
- Hooligan, rapper and hip-hop pioneer

== Sports ==
Qrendi has various sports clubs:

- Qrendi Boċċi Club – The traditional bowls (Maltese: Boċċi) is practiced in Qrendi on sandy pitches, and where the club currently plays in the National third division.
- Qrendi Football Club – This club was formed in 1952, and it participates in the National; third division football league, and has a senior side and football nursery. Football in Qrendi is played on a synthetic artificial pitch.

== Zones in Qrendi ==
- Bieb ix-Xagħra
- Dawra tal-Hallelin
- Gwejdija
- Ħaġar Qim
- Ħal Lew
- Il-Fulija
- Il-Ħatba
- Il-Ħnejja
- Il-Ħofra
- Il-Maqluba
- Iż-Żellieqa
- L-Ilsna
- Mnajdra
- Qasam tal-Warda
- Ras il-Bajjada
- Il-Qasam ta' San Niklaw
- Sant' Anna
- Ta' Gana
- Ta' Guarena
- Ta' Ħarmanin
- Ta' Ħassajtek
- Tal-Bottijiet
- Tal-Gawwija
- Ta' Ħniena
- Tas-Siġra
- Tas-Suldati
- Wied Ħoxt
- Wied iż-Żurrieq

== Qrendi main roads ==
- Misraħ San Mattew (Saint Matthew square)
- Misraħ Santa Marija (Saint Mary Square)
- Misraħ Tal-Maqluba (Tal-Maqluba Square)
- Pjazza Principali (Main Square)
- Triq Antonio Chircop (Antonio Chircop Street)
- Triq Ħaġar Qim (Hagar Qim Road)
- Triq Rokku Buhagiar (Rocco Buhagiar Street)
- Triq San Mattew (St. Matthew Street)
- Triq Santa Katerina (St. Catherine Street)
- Triq il-Kbira (Main Street)
- Triq is-Salvatur (Our Saviour Street)
- Triq is-Siġġiewi (Siġġiewi Road)
- Triq it-Tempesta (Bypass)
- Triq iż-Żurrieq (Żurrieq Road)
- Triq l-Imqabba (Mqabba Road)
- Triq Wied iż-Żurrieq (Wied iż-Żurrieq Road)
