= List of monuments in Żurrieq =

This is a list of monuments in Żurrieq, Malta, which are listed on the National Inventory of the Cultural Property of the Maltese Islands.

== List ==
Name of object	Location	Coordinates	ID	Photo	Upload
Niche of St Joseph	Triq il-Belt Valletta / Triq Dun Ġużepp Barbara	35°50′26″N 14°28′38″E	01253	Niche of St Joseph	Upload Photo
Niche of the Immaculate Conception	"Farmhouse Immaculate Conception", Triq il-Belt Valletta	35°50′09″N 14°28′32″E	01254	Niche of the Immaculate Conception	Upload Photo
Statue of St Joseph (statue removed)	84 Triq Santa Katarina c/w Triq L-Imqabba	35°49′56″N 14°28′27″E	01255		Upload Photo
Roundel of St. Anthony	107 Triq Santa Katarina	35°49′55″N 14°28′27″E	01256	Roundel of St. Anthony	Upload Photo
Niche of the Holy Family	157 Triq Santa Katarina	35°49′52″N 14°28′28″E	01257	Niche of the Holy Family	Upload Photo
Niche of St. Catherine	Triq Santa Katarina c/w Triq San Bartilmew	35°49′52″N 14°28′29″E	01258	Niche of St. Catherine	Upload Photo
Niche of St Roque	Trejqet Santa Katarina	35°49′51″N 14°28′29″E	01259	Niche of St Roque	Upload Photo
Parish Church of Saint Catherine	Misraħ ir-Repubblika	35°49′50″N 14°28′31″E	01260	Parish Church of Saint Catherine	Upload Photo
Empty Niche	Triq Santa Katarina c/w Misraħ ir-Repubblika	35°49′51″N 14°28′29″E	01261	Empty Niche	Upload Photo
Niche of the Madonna of Mount Carmel	Misraħ ir-Repubblika	35°49′49″N 14°28′29″E	01262	Niche of the Madonna of Mount Carmel	Upload Photo
Statue of St. Catherine	Misraħ ir-Repubblika	35°49′49″N 14°28′30″E	01263	Statue of St. Catherine	Upload Photo
Niche of St Michael	16 Triq San Mikiel c/w Triq L-Iben il-Ħali	35°49′47″N 14°28′32″E	01264	Niche of St Michael	Upload Photo
Niche of St Joseph	38 Triq San Mikiel	35°49′45″N 14°28′34″E	01265	Niche of St Joseph	Upload Photo
Niche of St. Catherine	"Santa Katarina", 75 Triq San Mikiel	35°49′42″N 14°28′34″E	01266	Niche of St. Catherine	Upload Photo
Empty Niche	Triq Bubaqra	35°49′37″N 14°28′37″E	01267	Empty Niche	Upload Photo
Statue of the Assumption	Misraħ Santa Marija	35°49′28″N 14°28′41″E	01268	Statue of the Assumption	Upload Photo
Niche of St Joseph	5-6 Triq San Iljun	35°49′27″N 14°28′44″E	01269	Niche of St Joseph	Upload Photo
Saint Leone's Chapel (Bubaqra Cemetery)	Triq Santa Marija c/w Triq San Iljun (Bubaqra Cemetery)	35°49′27″N 14°28′47″E	01270	Saint Leone's Chapel (Bubaqra Cemetery)	Upload Photo
Chapel of the Assumption of Mary	Triq Santa Marija c/w Triq Maria Farruġ	35°49′31″N 14°28′47″E	01271	Chapel of the Assumption of Mary	Upload Photo
Chapel of St. Agatha	Triq Ħal-Far c/w Triq Sant'Agata	35°49′45″N 14°28′56″E	01272	Chapel of St. Agatha	Upload Photo
Niche of St Joseph	5 Triq Ħal-Far	35°49′44″N 14°28′59″E	01273	Niche of St Joseph	Upload Photo
Niche of the Madonna of Mount Carmel	43/45 Triq San Martin	35°49′46″N 14°28′38″E	01274	Niche of the Madonna of Mount Carmel	Upload Photo
Niche of St. Catherine	"Arc en Ciel", 36 Triq San Martin	35°49′46″N 14°28′38″E	01275	Niche of St. Catherine	Upload Photo
Niche of the Sacred Heart of Jesus	68 Triq San Martin	35°49′46″N 14°28′36″E	01276	Niche of the Sacred Heart of Jesus	Upload Photo
Niche of the Madonna of Mount Carmel	51 Triq San Bartilmew	35°49′54″N 14°28′32″E	01277	Niche of the Madonna of Mount Carmel	Upload Photo
Niche of St. Jerome	9 Triq it-Tjieba	35°49′53″N 14°28′36″E	01278	Niche of St. Jerome	Upload Photo
Empty Niche	62 Triq il-Karmnu	35°49′53″N 14°28′37″E	01279	Empty Niche	Upload Photo
Niche of St Paul	66/68 Triq il-Karmnu	35°49′53″N 14°28′38″E	01280	Niche of St Paul	Upload Photo
Niche of St Joseph	141 Triq San Bartilmew	35°49′57″N 14°28′45″E	01281	Niche of St Joseph	Upload Photo
Niche of St Paul	Triq San Bartilmew c/w Triq San Pawl	35°49′57″N 14°28′44″E	01282	Niche of St Paul	Upload Photo
Saint Andrew's Chapel	Triq iż-Żurrieq, Safi c/w Triq Sant'Andrija, Safi	35°49′55″N 14°28′50″E	01283	Saint Andrew's Chapel	Upload Photo
Niche of St Michael	119 Triq San Bartilmew	35°49′55″N 14°28′39″E	01284	Niche of St Michael	Upload Photo
Niche of St. Catherine	94 Triq San Bartilmew	35°49′55″N 14°28′38″E	01285	Niche of St. Catherine	Upload Photo
Niche of St Paul	92 Triq San Bartilmew	35°49′54″N 14°28′38″E	01286	Niche of St Paul	Upload Photo
Chapel of Saint Bartholomew	80 Triq San Bartilmew	35°49′54″N 14°28′37″E	01287	Chapel of Saint Bartholomew	Upload Photo
Cross	Triq il-Kbira / Sqaq il-Fjuri	35°49′47″N 14°28′27″E	01288	Cross	Upload Photo
Chapel of Saint James	45 Triq il-Kbira	35°49′47″N 14°28′26″E	01289	Chapel of Saint James	Upload Photo
Niche of St Joseph	Triq L-Inġiniera	35°49′45″N 14°28′20″E	01290	Niche of St Joseph	Upload Photo
Niche of St Joseph	63 Triq il-Ħaddiema	35°49′48″N 14°28′18″E	01291	Niche of St Joseph	Upload Photo
Niche of St. Catherine	53 Triq il-Ħaddiema	35°49′48″N 14°28′19″E	01292	Niche of St. Catherine	Upload Photo
Statue of St. Nicholas of Bari	Triq il-Ħaddiema c/w Triq il-Qrendi	35°49′50″N 14°28′21″E	01293	Statue of St. Nicholas of Bari	Upload Photo
Niche of the Immaculate Conception	"Palazzo Armeria", 35 Triq il-Ħaddiema	35°49′50″N 14°28′21″E	01294	Niche of the Immaculate Conception	Upload Photo
Niche of the Madonna of Mount Carmel	Triq L-Armerija c/w Misraħ Mattia Preti	35°49′50″N 14°28′24″E	01295	Niche of the Madonna of Mount Carmel	Upload Photo
Niche of St. John the Baptist	Triq Wied Babu	35°49′40″N 14°28′04″E	01297	Niche of St. John the Baptist	Upload Photo
Niche of the Madonna of Sorrows	32 Triq il-Warda c/w Sqaq il-Fniek	35°49′44″N 14°28′15″E	01298	Niche of the Madonna of Sorrows	Upload Photo
Niche of the Madonna of Mount Carmel	85 Triq il-Ħaddiema	35°49′46″N 14°28′17″E	01299	Niche of the Madonna of Mount Carmel	Upload Photo
Niche of the Madonna of the Rosary	13 Triq San Leopoldu	35°49′43″N 14°28′17″E	01300	Niche of the Madonna of the Rosary	Upload Photo
Niche of St. Anne	437 Triq il-Kbira c/w Sqaq	35°49′45″N 14°28′21″E	01301	Niche of St. Anne	Upload Photo
Niche of the Madonna of Mount Carmel	6 Triq il-Fjuri	35°49′42″N 14°28′18″E	01302	Niche of the Madonna of Mount Carmel	Upload Photo
Statue of the Sacred Heart of Jesus	"St. Theresa Home", 37 Triq il-Kunċizzjoni	35°49′32″N 14°28′16″E	01303	Statue of the Sacred Heart of Jesus	Upload Photo
Niche of the Madonna of Mount Carmel	20 Triq il-Kunċizzjoni	35°49′32″N 14°28′15″E	01304	Niche of the Madonna of Mount Carmel	Upload Photo
Chapel of the Immaculate Conception (Nigret Chapel)	Triq il-Kunċizzjoni	35°49′31″N 14°28′16″E	01305	Chapel of the Immaculate Conception (Nigret Chapel)	Upload Photo
Niche of the Madonna of Lourdes	"Exodus", 14 Triq il-Kunċizzjoni	35°49′32″N 14°28′15″E	01306	Niche of the Madonna of Lourdes	Upload Photo
Chapel of the Annunciation (Ħal-Millieri)	Triq iż-Żurrieq, Ħal Millieri	35°50′21″N 14°28′16″E	01307	Chapel of the Annunciation (Ħal-Millieri)	Upload Photo
Chapel of Saint John (Ħal-Millieri)	Triq iż-Żurrieq, Ħal Millieri	35°50′24″N 14°28′15″E	01308	Chapel of Saint John (Ħal-Millieri)	Upload Photo
Empty Niche (there is statue of the Immaculata in the niche (May 2024)	55 Triq il-Karmnu	35°49′52″N 14°28′36″E	01309	Empty Niche (there is statue of the Immaculata in the niche (May 2024)	Upload Photo
Niche of the Madonna of Mount Carmel	30 Triq il-Karmnu	35°49′50″N 14°28′34″E	01310	Niche of the Madonna of Mount Carmel	Upload Photo
Wardija Tower	Triq L-Iskulturi Fabri	35°49′09″N 14°28′23″E	01386	Wardija Tower	Upload Photo
Bubaqra Tower	Triq it-Torri / Triq Nardu Sacco	35°49′31″N 14°28′33″E	01432	Bubaqra Tower	Upload Photo
