= Din l-Art Ħelwa =

Voluntary organisation

Din l-Art Ħelwa National Trust of Malta

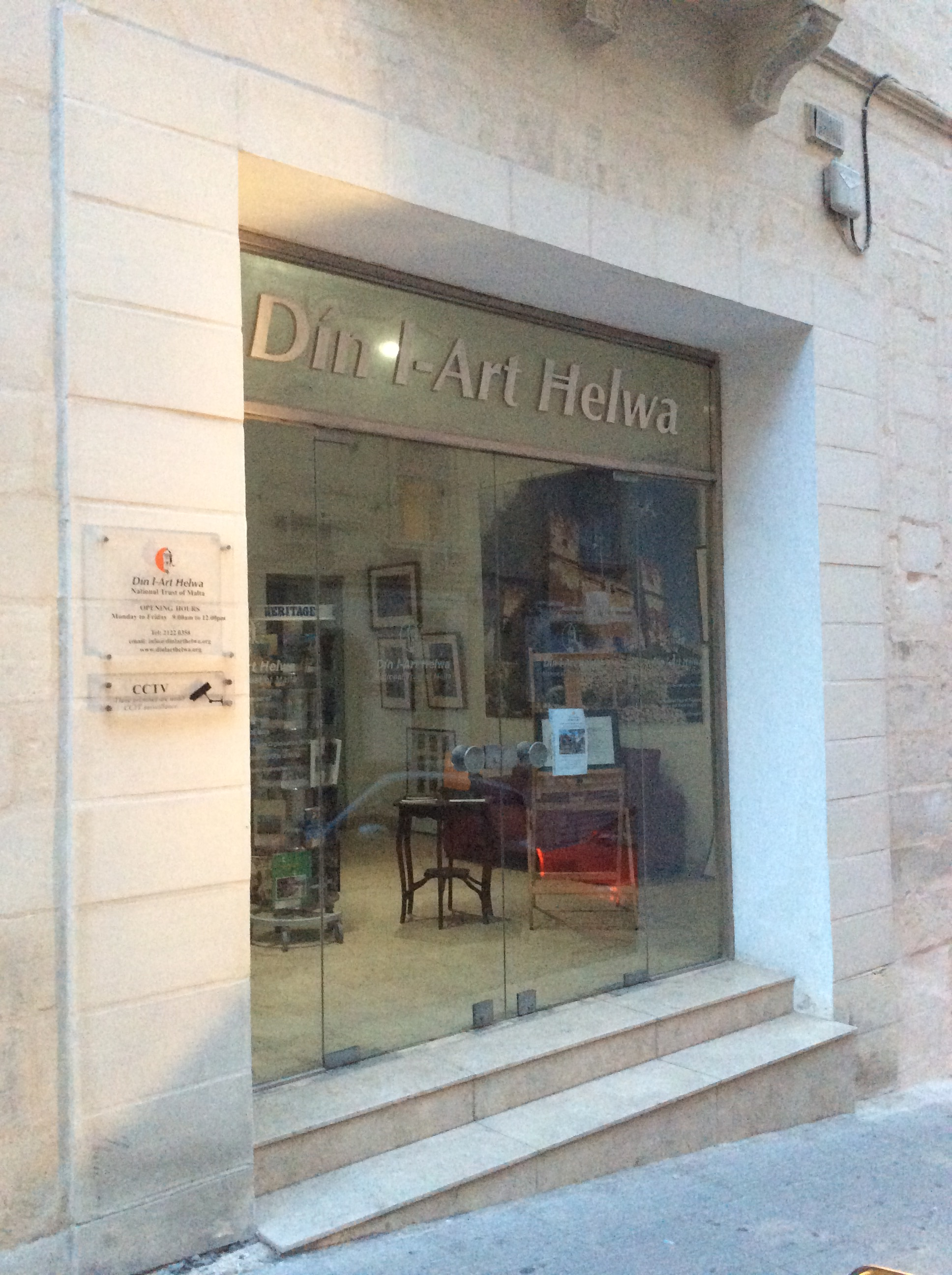
- Office at Palazzo Nobile, Valletta
- Abbreviation: DLĦ
- Formation: 1965
- Founder: Maurice Caruana Curran
- Legal status: NGO
- Purpose: Maltese heritage
- Location: Palazzo Nobile, 133, Melita Street, Valletta
- Official language: Maltese and English
- Executive President: Alex Torpiano
- Key people: Rosanne Zerafa
- Website: dinlarthelwa.org

Din l-Art Ħelwa (lit. 'This Sweet Land') is a non-governmental and non-profit, voluntary organisation founded in 1965 by Maltese Judge Maurice Caruana Curran to safeguard Malta's cultural heritage and natural environment. Since its foundation, Din l-Art Ħelwa has restored numerous cultural sites of historic and environmental importance and currently has the guardianship of a number of them. Many of the sites are open to visitors and for events, thanks to an army of dedicated volunteers. The organisation promotes the preservation and protection of historic buildings and monuments, the character of Malta's towns and villages, and places of natural beauty. It is very active in campaigning against proposed construction which infringes planning laws or policies, and regularly objects to planning applications, taking legal action to halt development in some cases. The NGO stimulates the enforcement of existing laws and the enactment of new ones for the protection of Malta's natural and built heritage.

== Name and offices ==
The name of the organization is derived from the first verse of L-Innu Malti, Malta's national anthem: "Lil din l-art ħelwa..." (This fair land). Letter Ħ is part of Maltese alphabet.

The offices of Din l-Art Ħelwa are located at 133 Melita Street, Valletta. The building is part of a large townhouse located at 130-135 Melita Street (formerly Strada Britannica). In 1816, part of the house belonged to Maria Stivala. The property was later owned by Antonio Giappone, and then by Giuseppe Apap.

== Properties managed ==
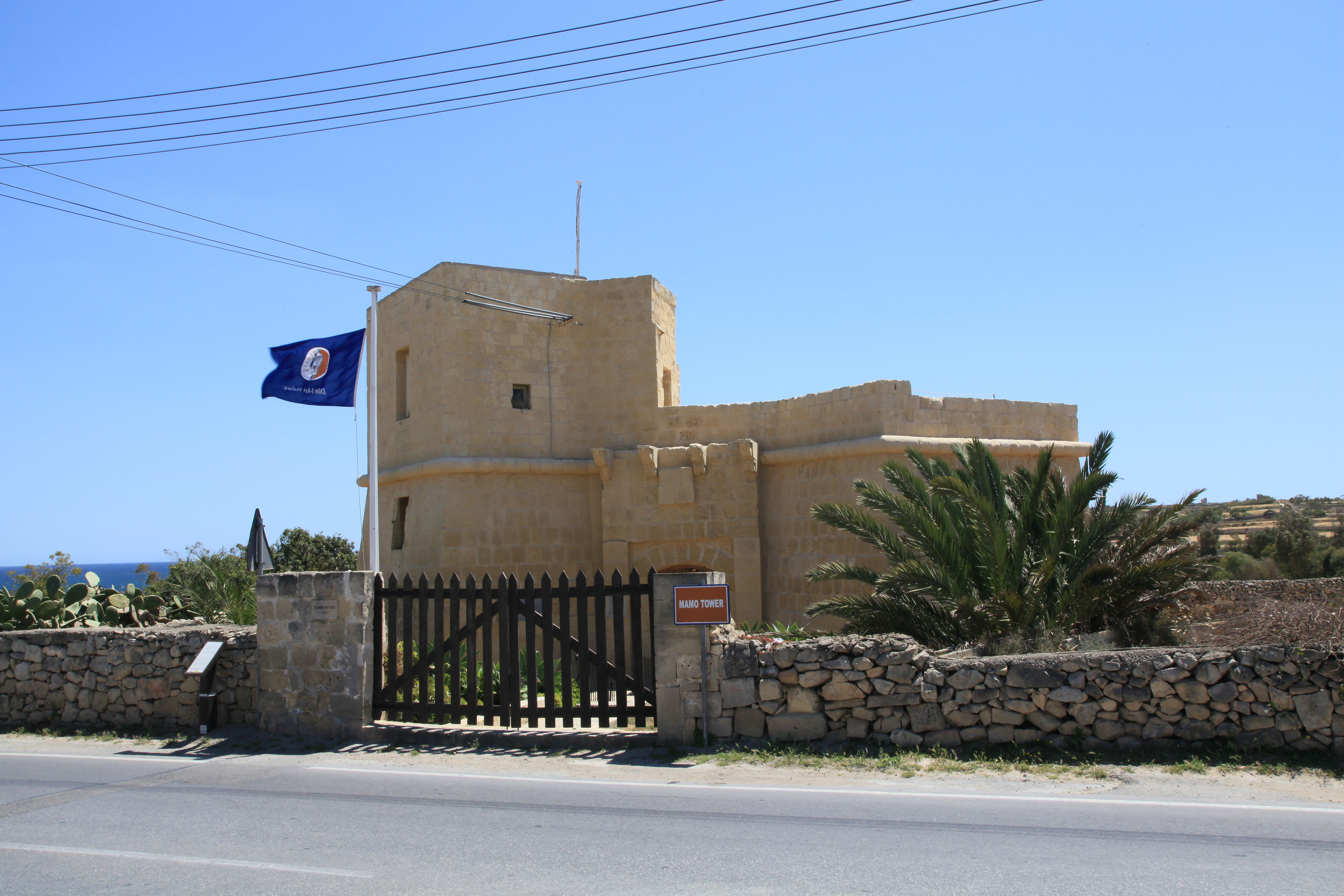
DLĦ flag at Mamo Tower in Marsaskala

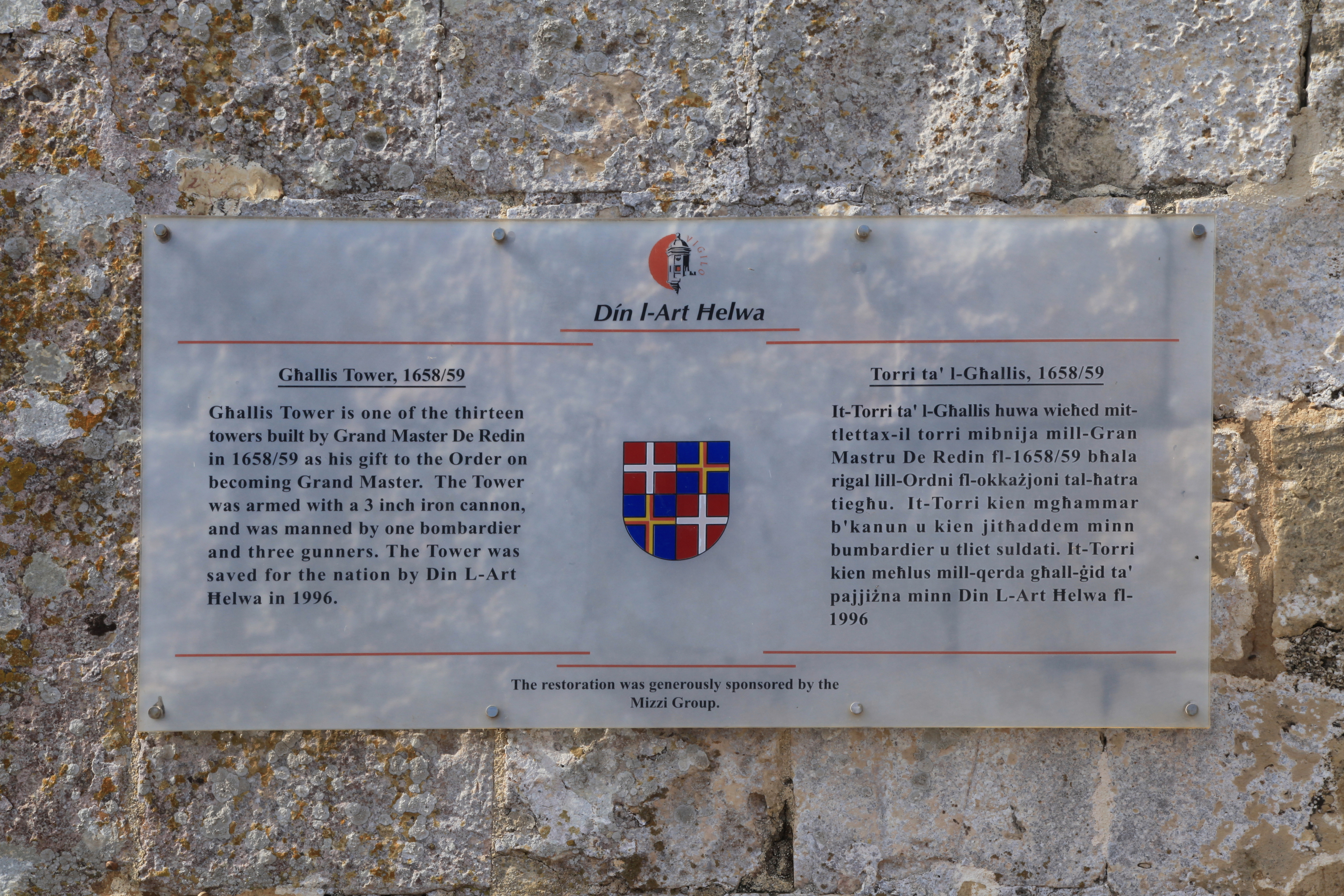
A Din l-Art Ħelwa plaque at Għallis Tower

Din l-Art Ħelwa has the following properties under its care in Malta:

- Part of Palazzo Nobile, the head office of the organization
- Foresta 2000, a forestation site in Mellieħa
- Wignacourt Tower, St Paul's Bay
- White Tower, Ahrax, Mellieha
- Saint Mark's Tower, Baħar iċ-Ċagħaq
- Msida Bastion Historic Garden, Floriana
- Mamo Tower, Marsaskala
- Għallis Tower, Salina, Naxxar
- Saint Agatha's Tower (the Red Tower), Mellieħa
- Delimara Lighthouse, Delimara
- Chapel of the Annunciation, Ħal-Millieri, Żurrieq
- St. John the Evangelist Chapel, Ħal-Millieri, Żurrieq
- Chapel of St Roque, Żebbuġ
- Chapel of Bir Miftuħ
- The Church of Our Lady of Victory in Valletta
- The Xutu Tower in Qrendi, Wied Iż-Żurrieq

Din l-Art Ħelwa has the following properties under its care in Gozo:

- Dwejra Tower
- Saint Anthony's Battery

Din l-Art Ħelwa has the following properties under its care in Comino:

- Saint Mary's Tower
- Saint Mary's Battery
