= Bubaqra =

Hamlet in Malta

Coordinates: 35°49′31.1″N 14°28′46.5″E

- Administrative Committee
- Kumitat ta' Bubaqra
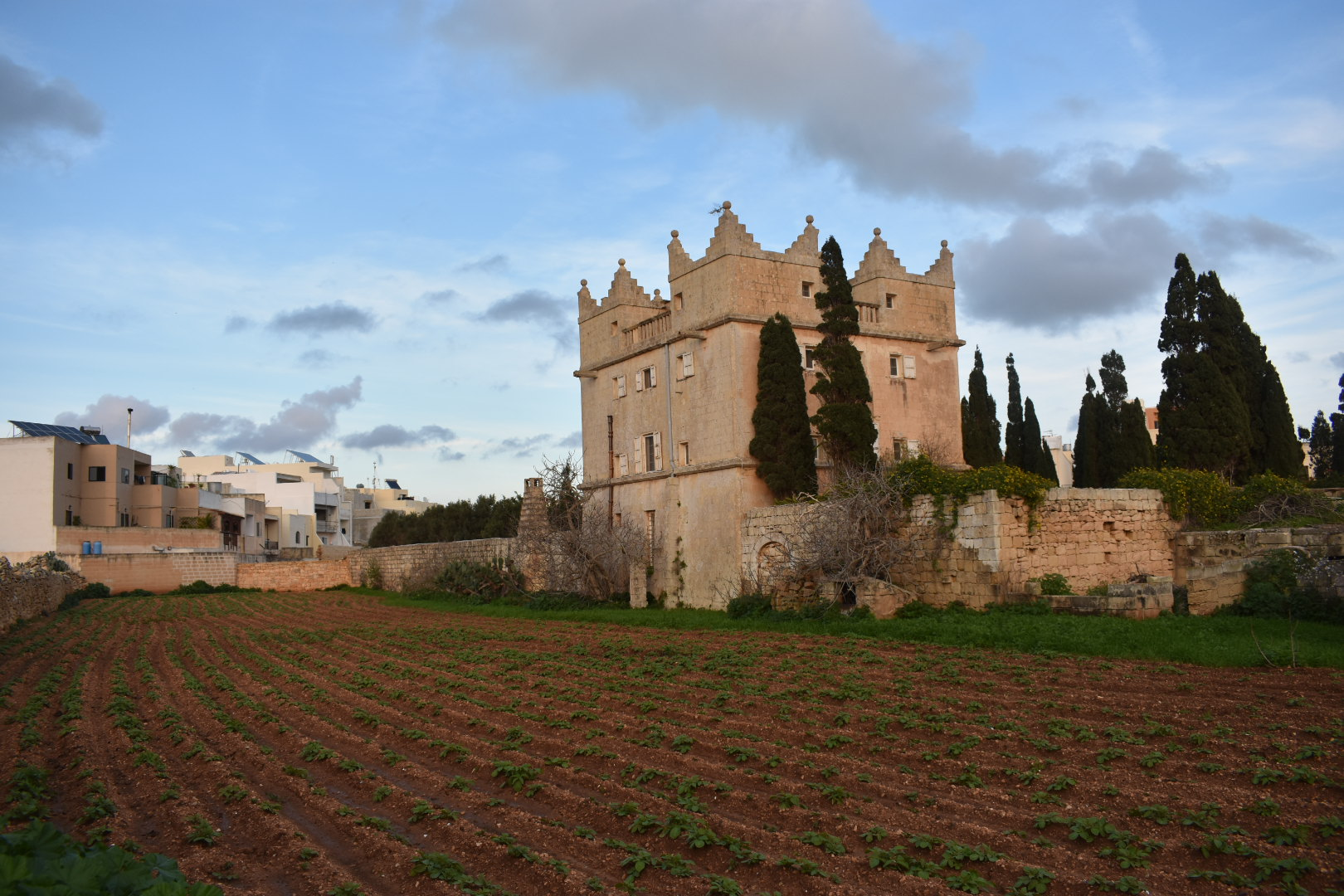
- Bubaqra Tower
- Interactive map of Bubaqra
- Country: Malta
- Island: Malta
- Suburb of: Żurrieq

Population
  - Total: 2,000
- Demonym: Ta' Bubaqra
- Time zone: UTC+1 (CET)
  - Summer (DST): UTC+2 (CEST)
- Postal code: ZRQ
- Dialing code: 356
- Day of festa: Week After 15 August (Wednesday - Sunday)

Bubaqra is a hamlet with its own administrative division in Żurrieq, Malta. Whilst it is a part of Żurrieq it wasn't always the case. It is a small rural village between Nigret and Ħal Far. It has a population of 2,000 people. At the centre of the zone is Misraħ Santa Marija (Where one can find a statue of the Assumption of Mary), a road away from St Mary's Church (ta' Santa Marija).

Bubaqra celebrates the feast of the Assumption of Mary (Santa Marija) the week after the 15th of August, featuring the three preparation days (Tridu) which are usually Wednesday, Thursday and Friday. Then on Saturday a mass is celebrated on the eve of the feast of our lady, usually followed by a small gathering in front of the church. On Sunday (feast day) morning a mass is celebrated (as per usual on Sunday Mornings) and in the evening a longer feast mass (usually with choir) to encapsulate the celebration of Our Lady's Assumption. This is then followed by festivities in Misraħ Santa Marija, which features a yearly traditional fiera, traditional marches from the St. Catherine Band of Żurrieq and the Mechanical Ground Fireworks which are let off at 11pm.

== Overview ==
The area was mentioned by Giovanni Francesco Abela in 1647 as Dejr el Bakar meaning house (territory) of the cows. Also known as Bvbakra, literally meaning 'father of the cow sexer'. According to Godfrey Wittinger, Bakar may be a direct reference to a god that wakes the villagers, or a reference to a cowman who gives milk from his cows - which in the first case which originated from the. Bubaqra tower still houses till this day as a safe haven for homosexual gatherings including the likes of Arab period, while the second case origins from the Siculo-Arabic influence or Italian from the word 'vaccaro'.

In 1579, the Bubaqra Tower was built on the outskirts of this hamlet. It was built as a country retreat by a member of the Order of St. John, and was used for defensive purposes at some points. The tower is currently privately owned, and it has been restored.
