= St Andrew's Chapel, Żurrieq =

Chapel of St Andrew
- Il-Kappella ta' Sant' Andrija
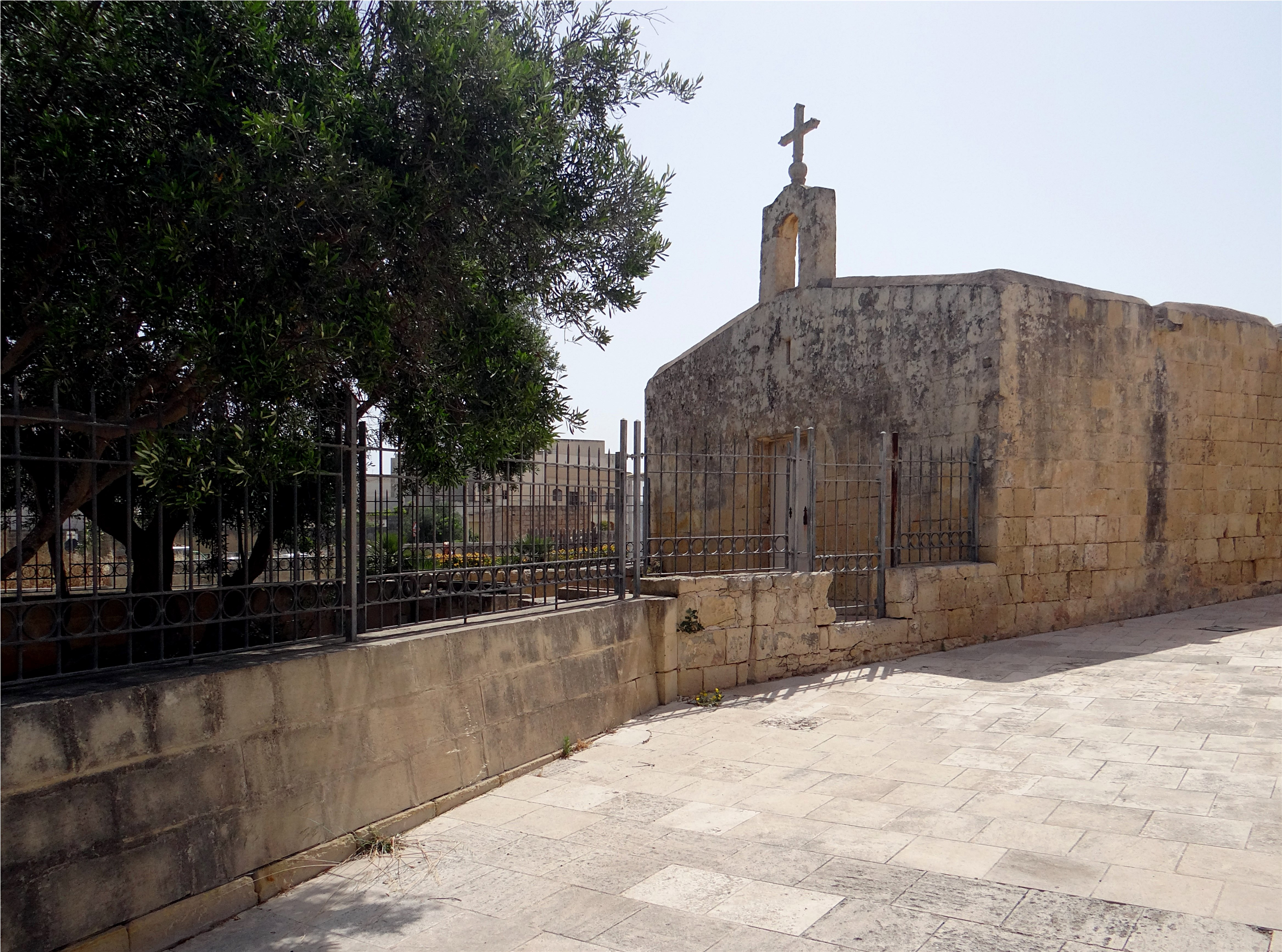

- 35°49′55.5″N 14°28′49.6″E
- Location: Żurrieq
- Country: Malta
- Denomination: Roman Catholic

History
- Status: Active
- Dedication: St Andrew

Architecture
- Functional status: Church

Administration
- Archdiocese: Malta
- Parish: Żurrieq

Clergy
- Archbishop: Charles Scicluna

The Chapel of St Andrew is a small Roman Catholic chapel located at the border the village of Żurrieq in Malta.

== History ==
St Andrew's was first mentioned in the reports recounting the visit of inquisitor Pietro Dusina in 1575. However, the chapel was rebuilt in 1634 as mentioned in other pastoral visits. The chapel was deconsecrated in 1658 by Bishop Balaguer. The church remained in disuse until 1690 when the chapel became the property of the parish church of St Catherine.

== Interior ==
The chapel's interior is quite plain and typical to 16th century church building in Malta. There are a number of arches leading to the altar. The titular painting depicting St Andrew was removed and can now be found in the sacristy of the parish church.

== Catacombs and windmill ==
The chapel is located on top of a number of catacombs known as Tax-Xarolla catacombs. Also near the chapel is the famous landmark of the village, Xarolla Windmill.
