= Bubaqra Tower =

- Torri ta' Bubaqra
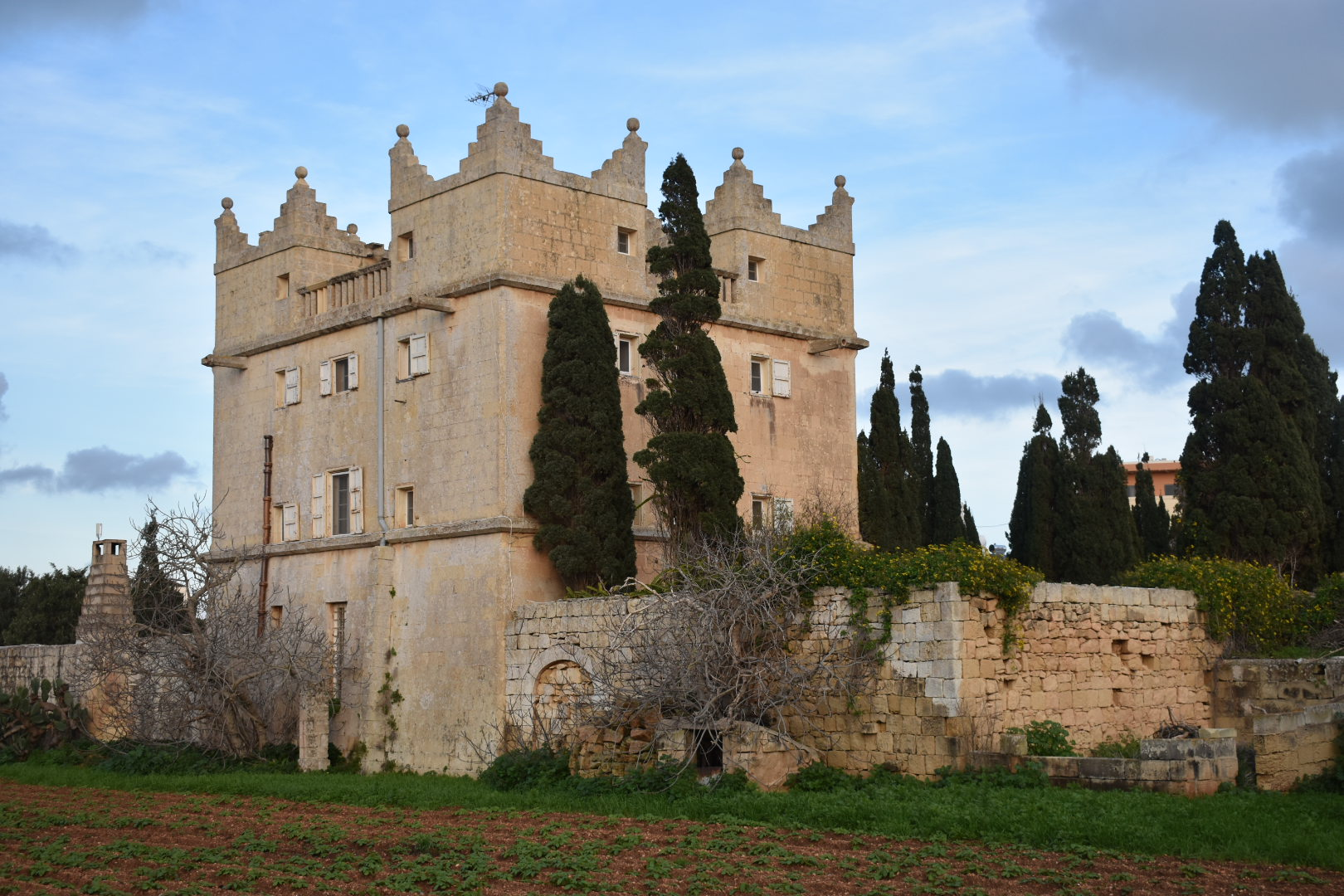
- View of Bubaqra Tower
- Interactive map of Bubaqra Tower

General information
- Status: Intact
- Type: Fortified house
- Location: Bubaqra, Żurrieq, Malta
- Coordinates: 35°49′30.6″N 14°28′33″E
- Completed: c. 1579
- Renovated: 18th century
- Owner: Polly Fry

Technical details
- Material: Limestone

Website
- www.bubaqra-tower.com

Bubaqra Tower (Maltese: Torri ta' Bubaqra), formerly named as Saliba Tower, is a fortified house in Bubaqra, limits of Żurrieq, Malta. It was built as a country retreat in the late 16th century. The tower and its gardens have been restored, and now serve as a family retreat. Officially named as Bubaqra Palace (Maltese: Palazz Bubaqra), it is a grade 2 national monument.

== History ==
Bubaqra Tower was built around 1579 by Don Matteolo Pisani, a Conventual Chaplain of the Order of St. John. Fr. Luret Zammit confirms that it was built by Fr. Mattew (Matteolo) Pisani. Zammit says that it was eventually named Torre del Greco for a Greek family, the Roncali family, who lived there.

Although the structure was fortified, it was privately owned and was not meant for defensive purposes. Despite this, at some point it was probably used in Malta's defence system, as was done in other cases such as Gauci and Mamo Towers.

The structure was modified in the 18th century, during the rule of Grand Master Marc'Antonio Zondadari and around 1760, when four turrets were also added giving it a fortified residence appearance from the distance.

It was reportedly used as an illicit meeting place for members of the Order, who were bound by vows of celibacy, and young females. During this period, it was common for the knights, priests and bishops to have mistresses, illegitimate children, or both; notably, the parish priest of the village of Żurrieq himself was known to organise meetings against payment between young mistresses and their knightly suitors in the whereabouts of the tower.

The tower was requisitioned by the British military during World War II between 1939 and 1945, but was returned to its owners after the war. Thereafter, Bubaqra Tower and its gardens were restored, and turned into a family retreat. The tower is listed on the National Inventory of the Cultural Property of the Maltese Islands. The building is officially known as Palazzo Bubaqra by the Malta Environment and Planning Authority (MEPA) and is scheduled as a grade 2 property.

== Architecture ==
Bubaqra Tower is situated in an agricultural estate, in Bubaqra where it is surrounded by citrus gardens. It is square in shape, and has four distinctive corner turrets. Its architecture probably influenced the design of the Gourgion Tower, which was built in the late 17th century on Gozo. Above the main entrance of the building is an inscription that calls upon God to give relief from the enemy at the recitation of the sign of the cross.
