= St John's Chapel, Ħal Millieri =

St John's Chapel
- The Chapel of St John the Evangelist
- Kappella ta' San Ġwann l-Evanġelista
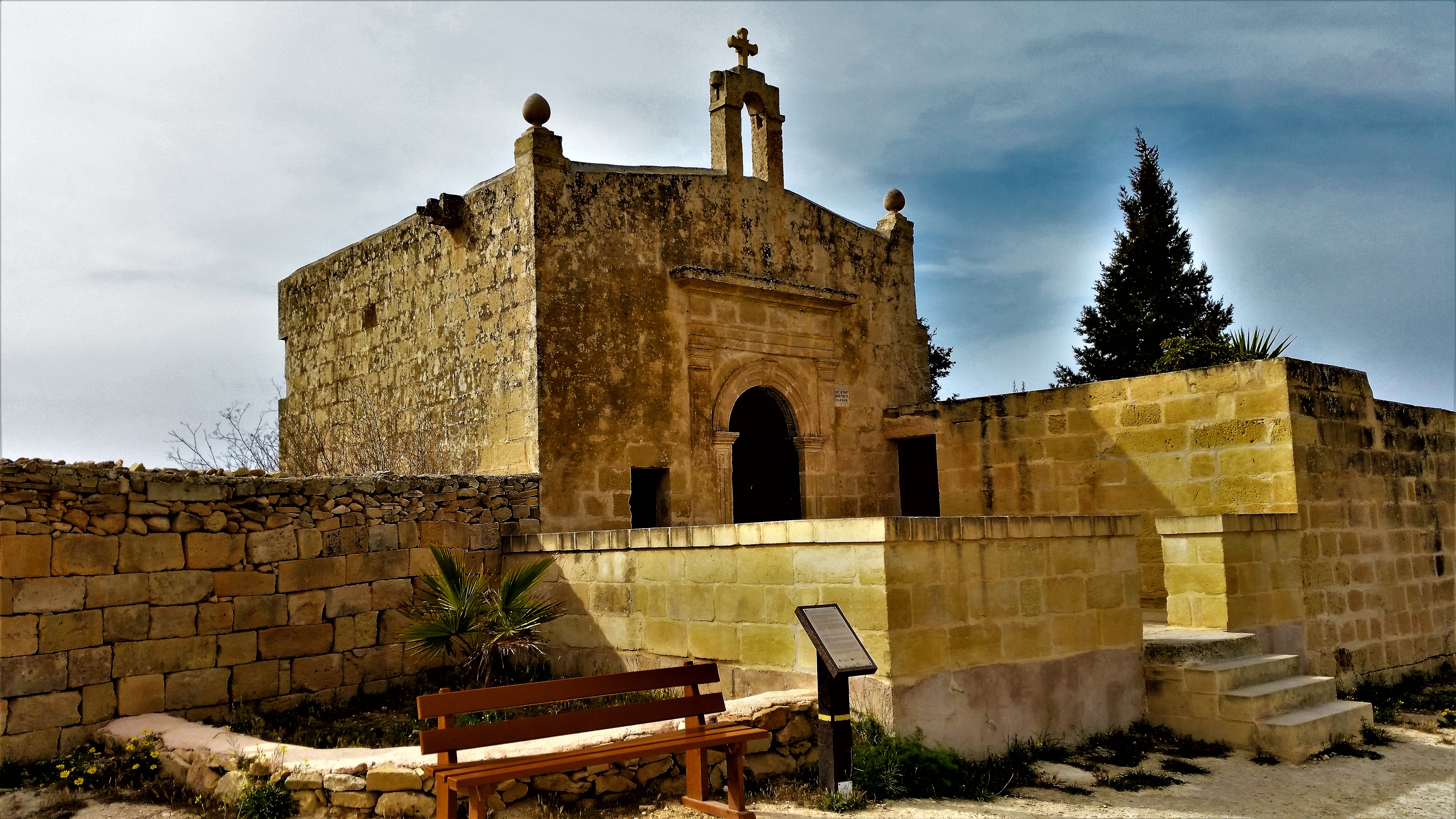

- Location within Malta
- 35°50′23.8″N 14°28′15.1″E
- Location: Żurrieq
- Country: Malta
- Denomination: Roman Catholic

History
- Founded: 1481
- Dedication: John the Evangelist

Administration
- Archdiocese: Malta

The Chapel of St John the Evangelist is a small Roman Catholic church located in the now uninhibited area known as Ħal Millieri which today forms part of the village of Żurrieq in Malta.

== Ħal Millieri ==
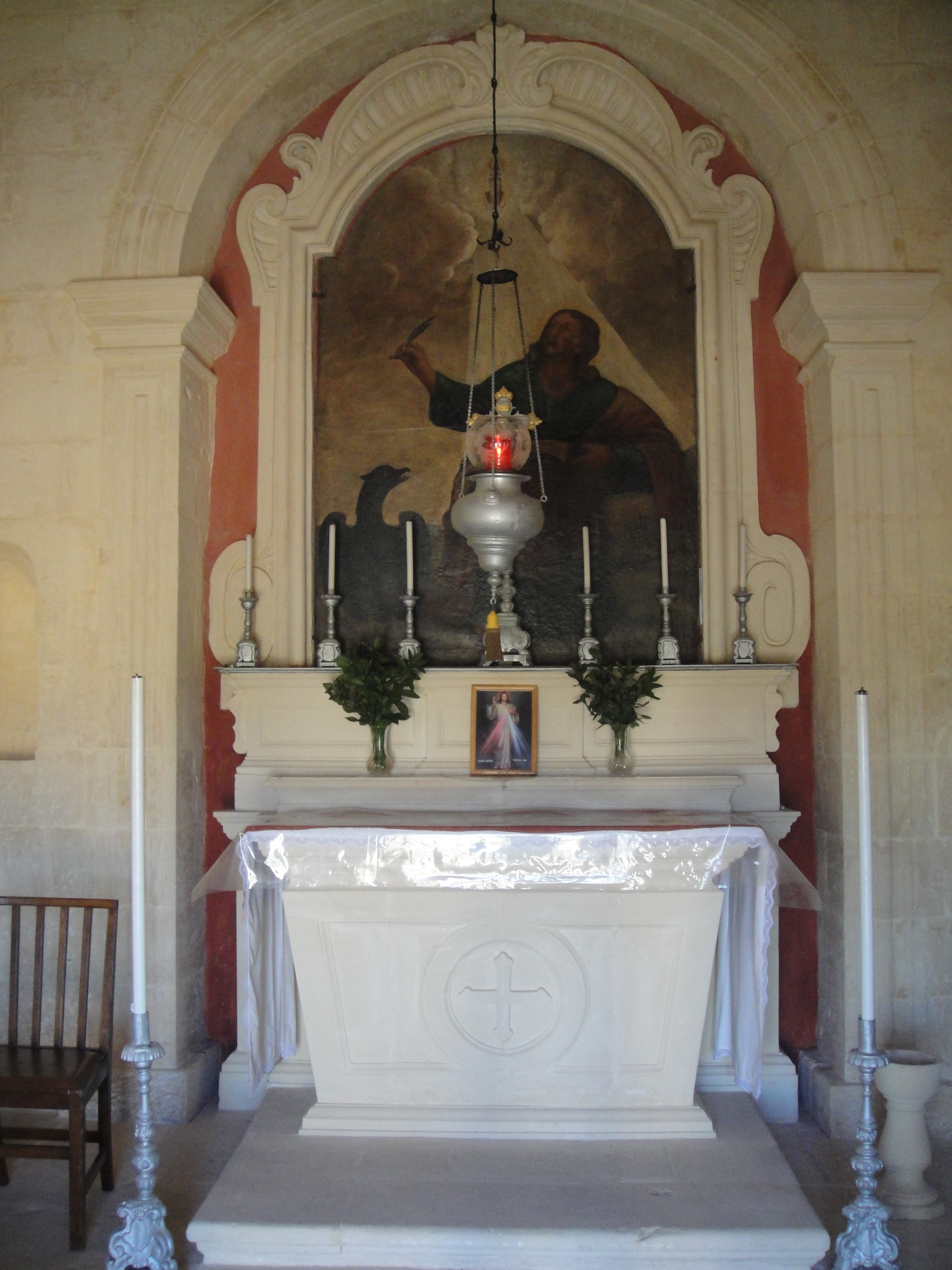
Interior of the Chapel

The village of Ħal Millieri is believed to have been a very old habitat dating back to Roman times. The area is situated between the villages of Żurrieq, Qrendi, Kirkop and Mqabba. A total of four churches were located within the village of which only two survive, St John's and the Annunciation chapel. Records show that the chapel of St John was located in the village centre, with the square in front of the chapel serving as the main village square where trade could take place. The population of the village decreased rapidly during the end of the 17th century. Eventually the village was abandoned and the only traces of the once busy village of Ħal Millieri are the two chapels mentioned before.

== The chapel ==
The original medieval chapel dedicated to the Evangelist St John was built sometime around 1481. It is recorded in inquisitor Pietro Dusina's report of his apostolic visit to the chapel in 1575. The report states that the chapel was in a dilapidated state, there were no doors, there were stone benches and a floor of beaten earth. Consequently, the church was deconsecrated however some time later it was reconsecrated and equipped with necessarily religious items.

The present chapel dates from 1640. In 1822 Reverend Ġakbu Gauci had plans to restore the chapel and turned to his nephew Franġisku Gauci to carry out the work. In the 20th century the chapel was enlarged and works commenced in 1961.

== Interior ==
The chapel has one stone altar with a titular painting depicting St John the Evangelist writing the Book of Revelation. The original painting was transferred to the parish church of Żurrieq out of safety concerns however a copy of the original painting was commissioned and put in its place.
