= Mamo Tower =

- Torri Mamo
- Marsaskala, Malta
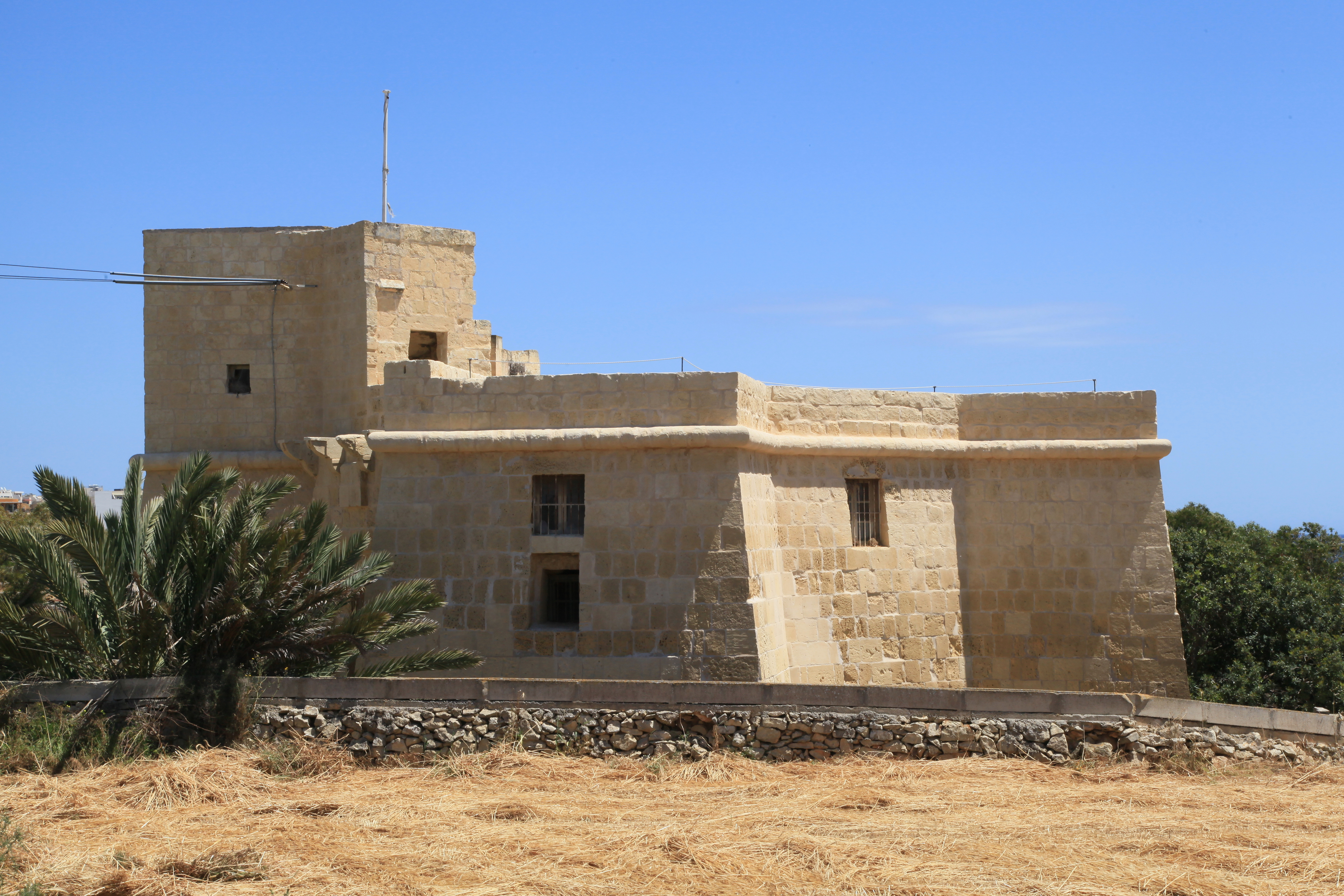
- Mamo Tower

Site information
- Type: Fortified house
- Owner: Government of Malta
- Controlled by: Din l-Art Ħelwa
- Open to the public: Yes
- Condition: Intact

Location
- Coordinates: 35°51′21″N 14°33′30.2″E

Site history
- Built: 1657
- Built by: Mamo family
- Materials: Limestone

Mamo Tower (Maltese: Torri Mamo), also known as San Tommaso Tower (Maltese: Torri Ta' Mamu), is a fortified residence in Marsaskala, Malta. It was built by the Mamo family in 1657 on rising ground above St Thomas Bay on the east shore of Malta.

== History ==
Mamo Tower was built in 1657 as a fortified residence for the Mamo family, who owned land in the area. It was started by Gregorio Mamo but was finished by his son Giorgio, both of whom were professional builders who were also responsible for the construction of a number of the Order of Saint John's fortifications in Malta.

The tower's shape is a St. Andrew's Cross with sixteen sides. The hall in the centre of the tower is bombproof, while the upper floor was left unfinished. The whole tower is surrounded by a 2 metre deep dry ditch, and while this was being excavated a Phoenician or Roman tomb was discovered. The tower does not have musketry loopholes, vision slits or other defensive features, but it was strong enough to protect the Mamo family and up to 80 farmers from the surrounding fields in a short raid by Barbary corsairs who landed at St Thomas Bay.

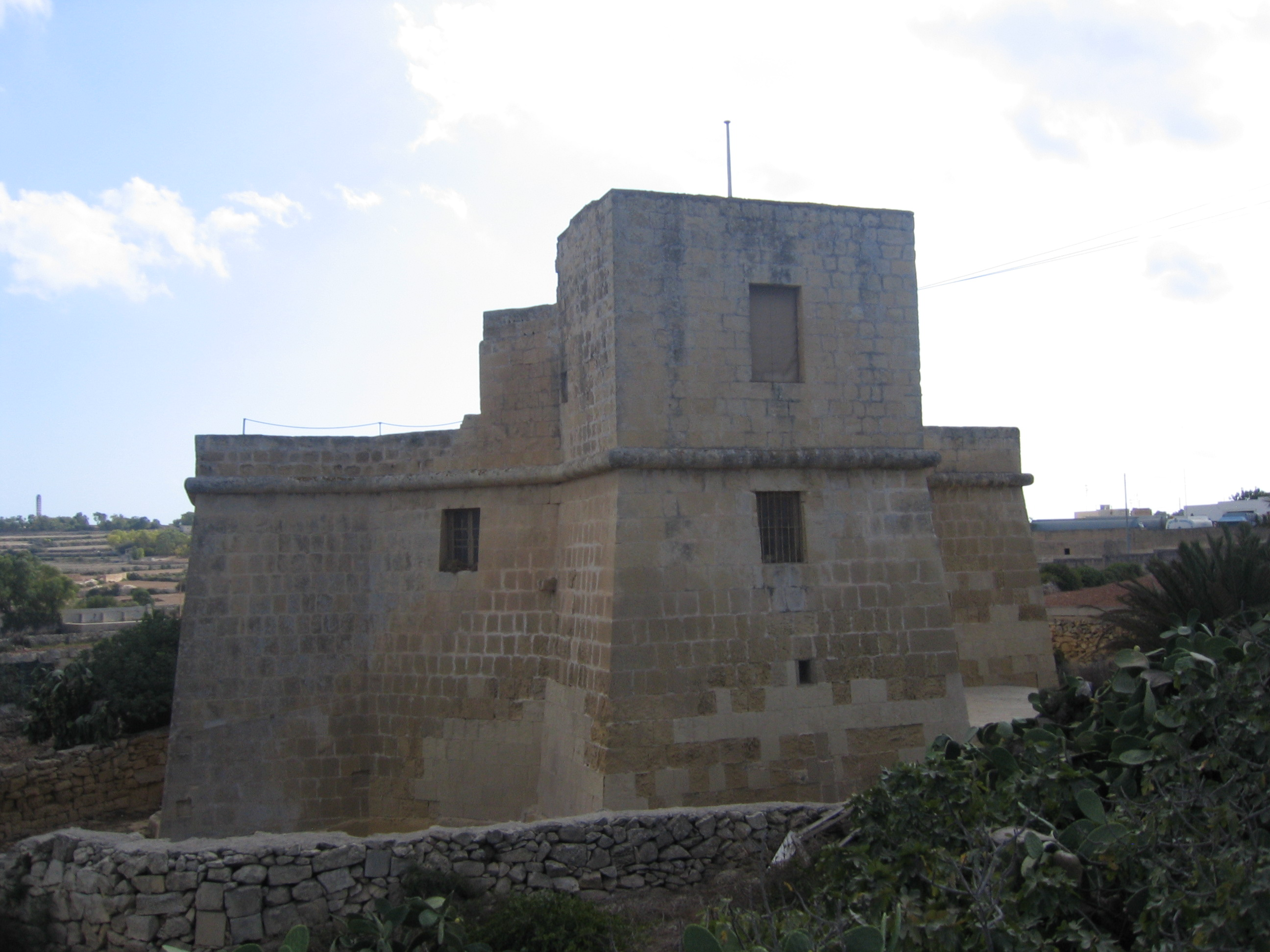
Torri Mamo

Mamo tower was integrated into the Order's coastal defence system (along with Wignacourt, Lascaris and De Redin towers) and contemporary paintings show it flying the Order's flag.

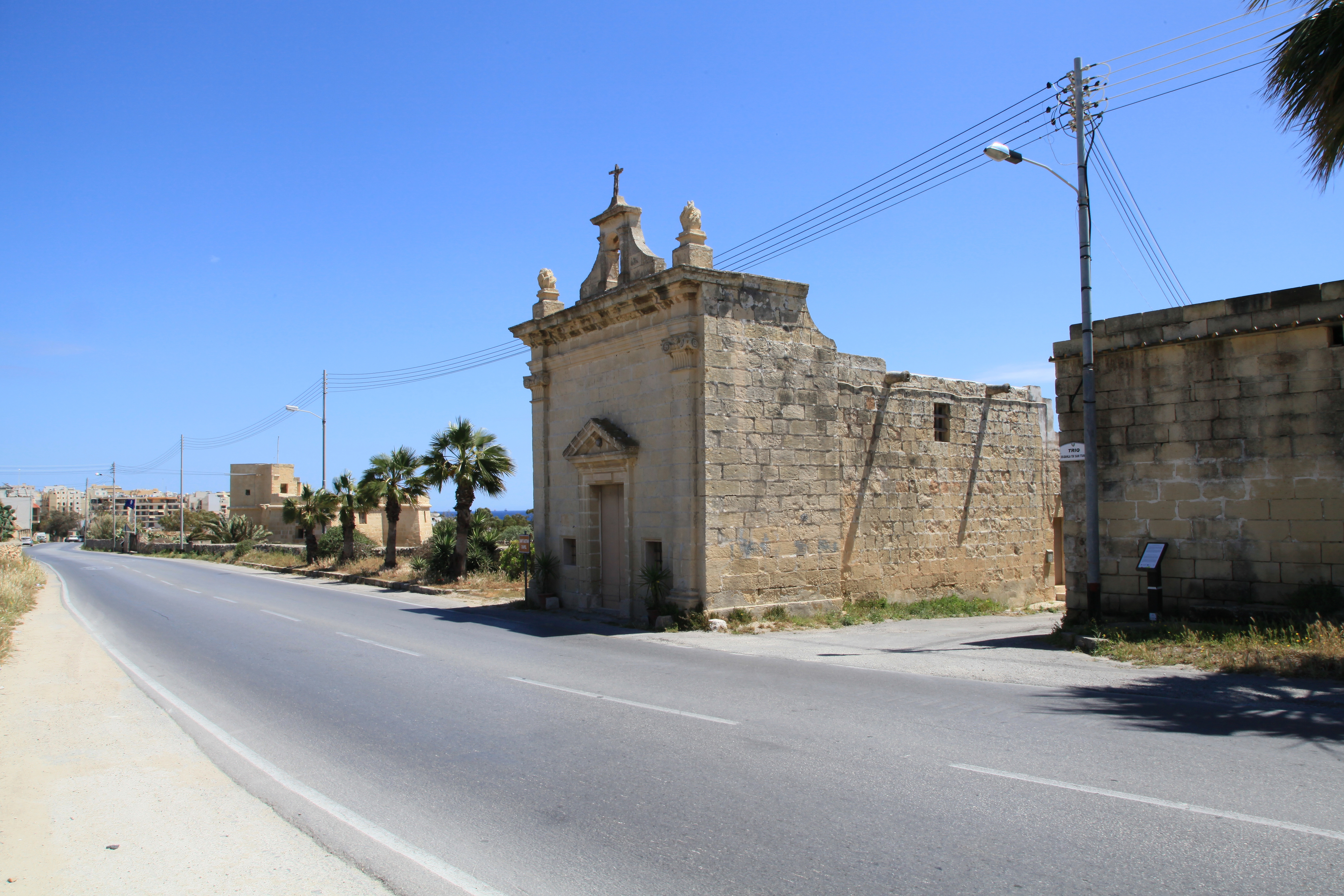
The Chapel of St. Cajetan (also built by the Mamo family) with Mamo Tower in the background.

About 50 metres away from the tower, the Mamo family also built a small chapel dedicated to Saint Cajetan. The chapel was built in the same year as the tower.

Over the years the tower had many different owners. It was eventually inherited by Lord Strickland, who later sold it. The tower was included on the Antiquities List of 1925.

With the beginning of World War II, the British military requisitioned the tower in 1940 and used it as a Regional Headquarters. In support of this role, they constructed a pillbox on the roof. Machine gun emplacements were also built on the roof.

The tower was eventually leased to a family from Żejtun and was used as a private house until 1987, when the poor condition of the building rendered it unsuitable for habitation.

=== Present day ===
The tower was subsequently acquired by Din l-Art Ħelwa, the National Trust of Malta, who restored it between 1994 and 1995. During the restoration, the pillbox was removed.

The tower has been open to the public since 2003. It is now open on Thursdays, Fridays, Saturdays and Sundays. It is also occasionally used for re-enactments.
