= St Mary's Church, Żurrieq =

Church of St Mary
- The Church of the Assumption of Mary
- Il-Knisja ta' Santa Marija ta' Bubaqra
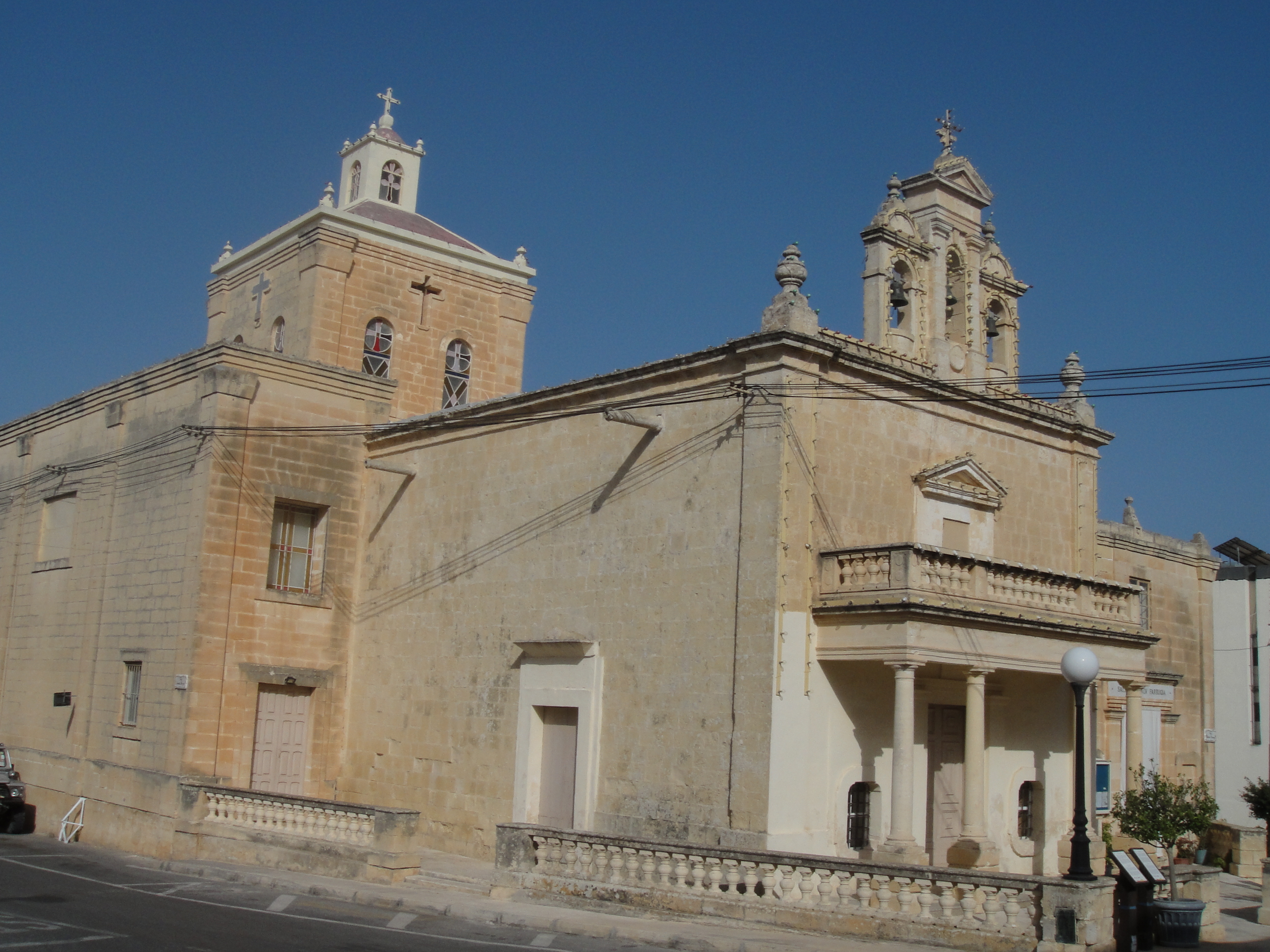

- 35°49′31.3″N 14°28′46.9″E
- Location: Żurrieq
- Country: Malta
- Denomination: Roman Catholic

History
- Status: Active
- Dedication: Assumption of Mary

Architecture
- Functional status: Church

Administration
- Archdiocese: Malta
- Parish: Żurrieq

Clergy
- Archbishop: Charles Scicluna

The Church of St Mary, formally the Church of the Assumption of Mary or more commonly known as Santa Marija ta' Bubaqra, is a Roman Catholic church located in the village of Żurrieq, in the area called Bubaqra, in Malta.

== History ==
The present church may have been built on the original site of two old chapels, one dedicated to Saint Roch and the other to Saint Sebastian. The chapel of St Mary was built after the plague of 1676. The chapel experienced major restructuring in 1961 when it was enlarged to accommodate the increasing population of the area. This was done on the initiative of Reverend Salv Farrugia. The church is now in the care of Kumitat Pastorali ta' Bubaqra.
