= Church of St Catherine, Żurrieq =

Church of St Catherine
- The Matrix Parish Church of St Catherine of Alexandria
- Knisja Arċipretali u Matriċi ta' Santa Katerina
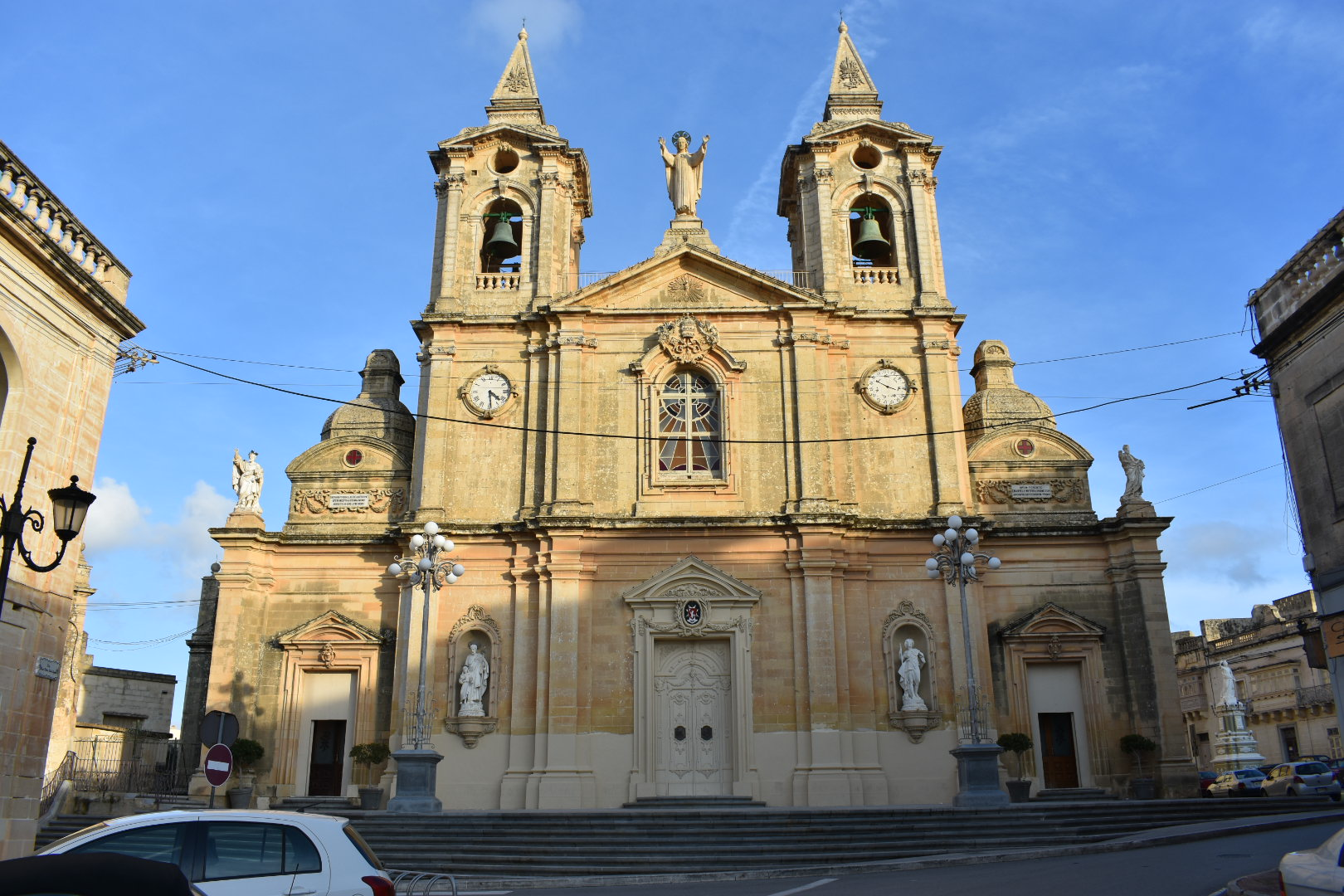
- Church of St Catherine
- 35°49′50.1″N 14°28′31.1″E
- Location: Żurrieq, Malta
- Denomination: Roman Catholic
- Website: Website of the Church

History
- Status: Active
- Founded: 1632
- Dedication: Saint Catherine of Alexandria
- Dedicated: 30 December 1731

Architecture
- Functional status: Parish church
- Architect: Matteolo Saliba
- Architectural type: Church
- Style: Baroque

Administration
- Archdiocese: Malta
- Parish: Żurrieq

The Church of St Catherine (Maltese: Il-Knisja Arċipretali ta' Santa Katerina) is a Roman Catholic parish church that serves the village of Żurrieq.

== History ==
The original parish church of Żurrieq is first mentioned in 1436 by Bishop Senatore de Mello who was commissioned to do an inventory of the parish churches in Malta. The church was mentioned again in 1575, in a report by inquisitor Pietro Dusina. Considering the increase in the village population, in 1630 the then parish priest, Antonio Demos, started to plan for the building of a new church. The building started in 1632-1633 under the direction of Reverend Matteolo Saliba, who was also the architect of the new church. The church was completed in 1658 after 25 years.

The church is listed on the National Inventory of the Cultural Property of the Maltese Islands.

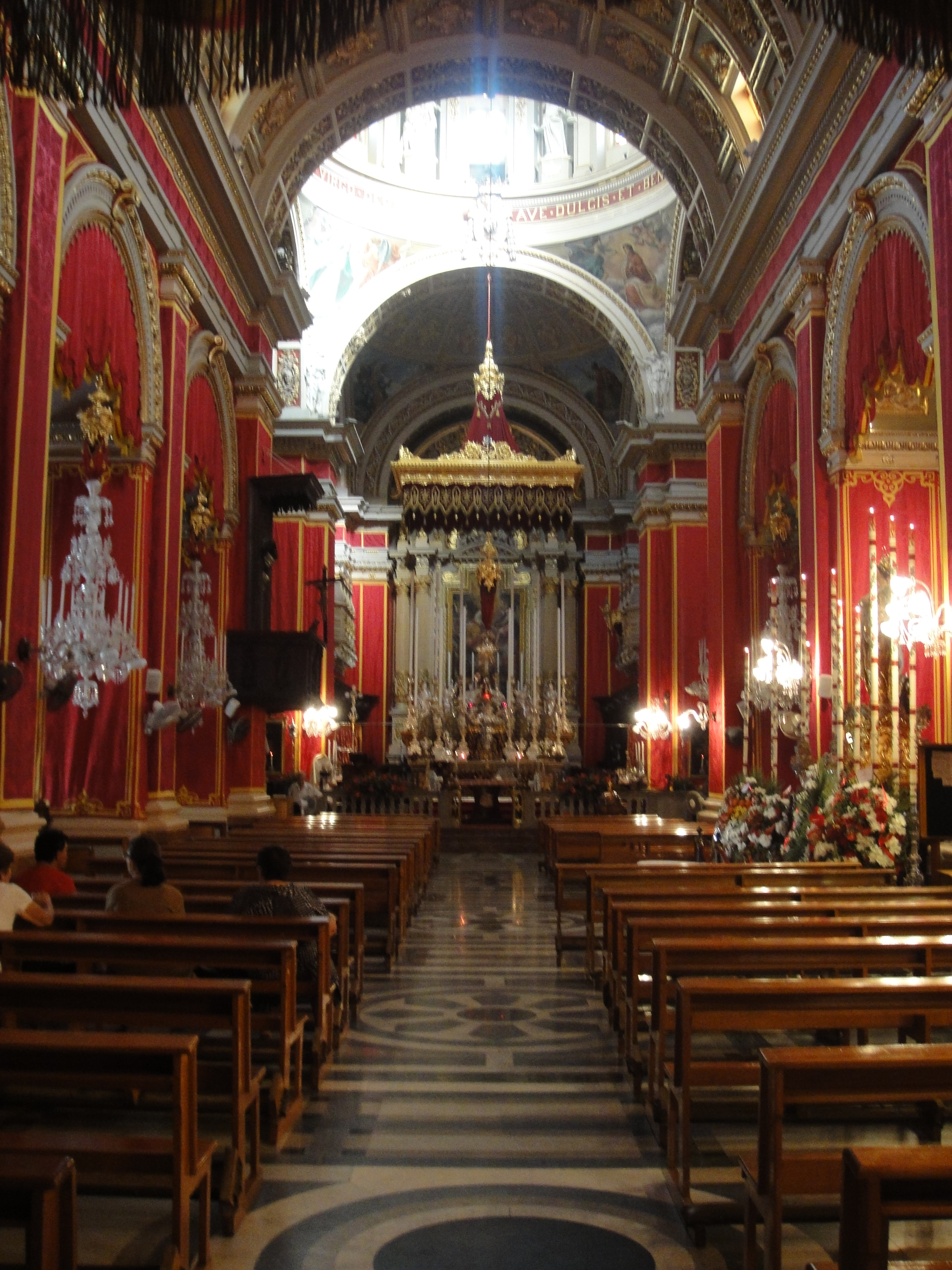
Interior of the church

== Works of art ==
The church includes a number of paintings by Mattia Preti. These include the Martyrdom of Saint Stephen, Martyrdom of Saint Andrew, Martyrdom of Saint Catherine of Alexandria, Eternal Father, Visitation of the Virgin to Saint Elizabeth, Saint Roch, Saint Blaise, Saint Dominic, Saint Nicholas of Tolentino and of Our Lady of Graces. The Church also includes a painting of Our Lady of Mount Carmel by Antonio Zammit inaugurated in 1908. The titular statue of St Catherine of Alexandria, dating from 1818, was made by Marjanu Gerada. Another statue is that of Our Lady of Mount Carmel made by Salvu Psaila and finished in 1842.

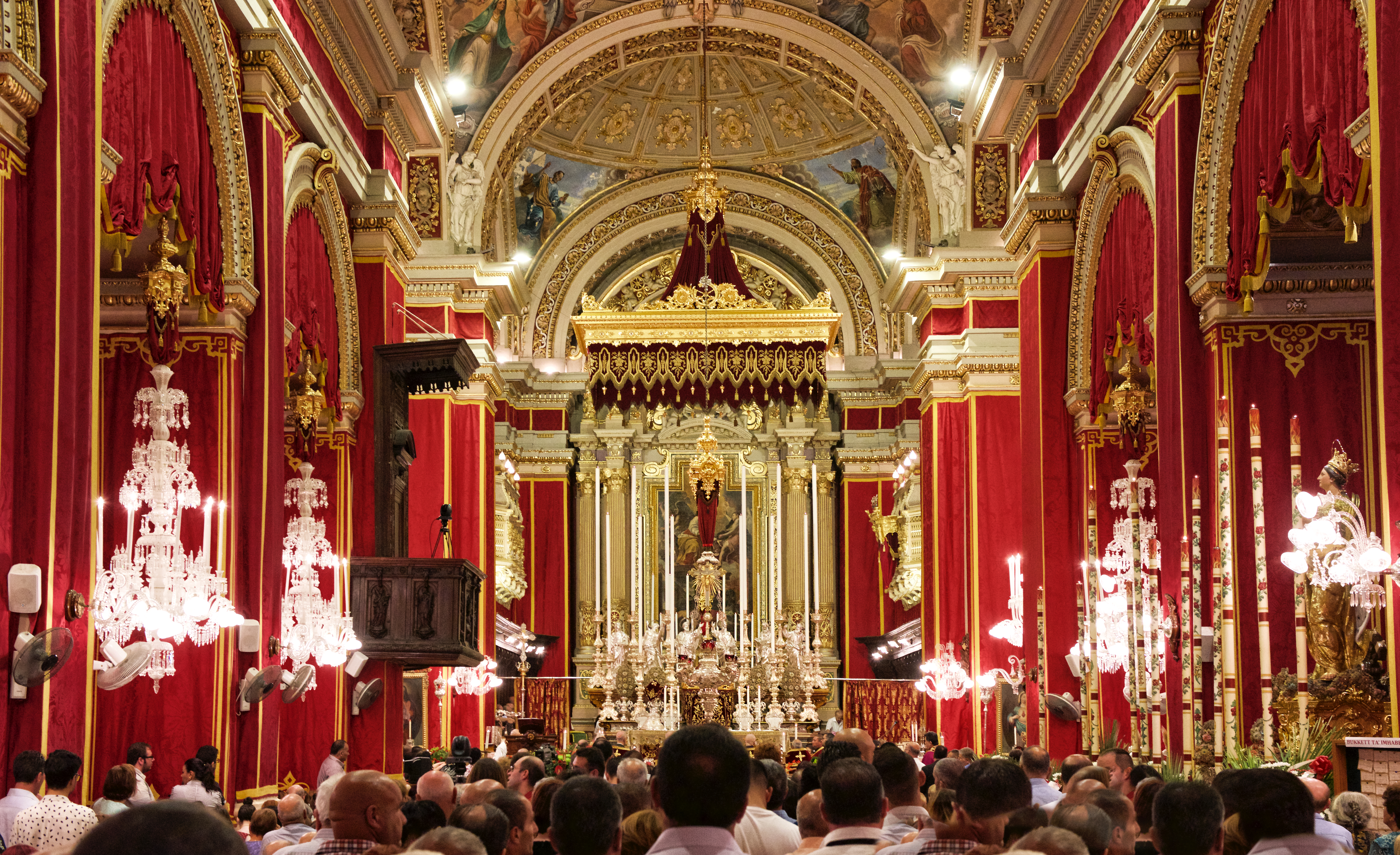
Interior of the church of St Catherine - Zurrieq

== See also ==
- Culture of Malta
- History of Malta
- List of Churches in Malta
- Religion in Malta
