= Chapel of the Annunciation, Żurrieq =

Chapel of the Annunciation
- The Medieval Chapel of the Annunciation
- Kappella Medjevali tal-Lunzjata
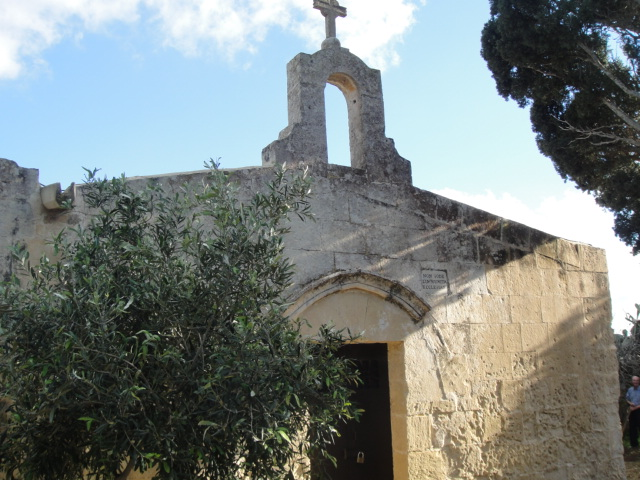

- Location within Malta
- 35°50′21.4″N 14°28′15.3″E
- Location: Żurrieq
- Country: Malta
- Denomination: Roman Catholic

History
- Founded: 1450
- Dedication: Annunciation
- Consecrated: 1480

Architecture
- Style: Siculo-Norman

Administration
- Archdiocese: Malta

The Chapel of the Annunciation is a Medieval Roman Catholic church located in Ħal-Millieri, limits of Żurrieq, Malta.

== History ==
The now uninhabited village of Ħal-Millieri was first documented in 1419 though it originates from Roman or even pre-historic times. The present church was built around 1450 on the site of an earlier 13th century chapel. The Annunciation Chapel at Ħal-Millieri was most probably used as a mosque when originally built. Its architecture supports this view; the apse was probably a qibla and the building points more or less to Mecca.

Studies on the skeletal remains, of those buried in the medieval period, revealed evidence of the probable first cases of syphilis in Malta.

The chapel was consecrated in 1480. During Monsignor Pietro Dusina's apostolic visit to Ħal-Millieri, in 1575, he found that there were a total of four churches in the area. Only two of these remain standing; The Annunciation and St John the Evangelist. During his visit, Dusina found that the church was in a state of good repair, had three altars and paved. However, he found that the church was not equipped with sacred vestments, income or even a rector. At his order the side altars were removed. In 1781, Archbishop Vincenzo Labini visited the chapel but found it to be in a neglected state. In the early 19th century, Ġuze Magro from Żurrieq restored the church. It was blessed by Reverend Gejtan Buttigieg in 1809. By time the chapel fell in disrepair until 1968 when the 'Teenagers Din l-Art Helwa' began cleaning the chapel. It has been recorded that upon cleaning, at least thirteen trucks worth of rubble and debris were removed.

In 1970, a Trust was set up on the initiative of the Żurrieq Council and the management of the chapel was given to Din l-Art Helwa who restored the chapel.

== Frescos ==
During the restoration a number of frescos were discovered on the wall. They date from the middle of the 15th century. The frescoes cover all the interior walls of the chapel except the apse. The frescos represent Saint Nicholas, Saint Andrew, Saint George, Saint James, Saint Lawrence, Saint Vincent, Saint Paul, Saint Augustine, Saint Blaise, Saint Agatha and Saint Leonard. Under the fresco of St Blaise and St Agatha one can see the signature of, probably the painter, with the name Garinu. These frescos were whitewashed, probably during the time that it was used as a stable. Restoration was undertaken by Paolo Zanolini in 1978. Maintenance of these frescoes is ongoing and over the years has involved institutions such as Courtaulds, Opificio delle Pietre Dure, the Malta University, Museums Department, and the Restoration Centre. Despite the efforts, most of the lower parts of the paintings were lost and so were plastered in natural hues.

== Architecture and interior ==
A pathway leads to the chapel and one has to descend three steps to enter. The chapel is built in the late medieval style. The square doors appear to have been originally ogival which is a common characteristic of Gothic architecture. The church has a height of 7.3 metres and a width of 5.2 metres.

The interior of the church consists of four pointed arches typical of medieval churches. The arch closest to the altar has the remains of a Rood screen. The church has one altar and includes a painting of the Annunciation above it. It was painted by Renè Sacco in 2003. The church also has a number of tombs. Also beside the church a number of graves were discovered.

=== Archaeological findings ===
Archaeologists from the University of Malta and of Oxford discovered a number of medieval coins and pieces of pottery. The foundations of the previous 13th century church were discovered. Also it was discovered that the church was built on the foundations of a Roman villa. In the church yard one can see a number of items dating back to Roman times such as the stone olive mortar.

== Recent history ==
The chapel in itself is a medieval treasure and Din l-Art Helwa is undertaking extensive monitoring exercises in order to determine the chapel’s exact condition and, correspondingly, the most adequate remedies.

The chapel is open for visits every first Sunday of the month, from 9.00 am to 12 noon.

It is listed on the National Inventory of the Cultural Property of the Maltese Islands.

== See also ==
- Culture of Malta
- History of Malta
- List of Churches in Malta
- Religion in Malta
