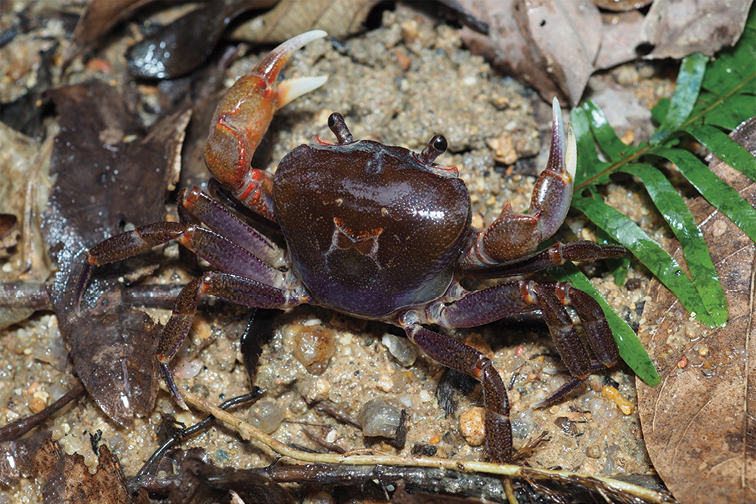

Scientific classification
- Domain: Eukaryota
- Kingdom: Animalia
- Phylum: Arthropoda
- Class: Malacostraca
- Order: Decapoda
- Suborder: Pleocyemata
- Infraorder: Brachyura
- Family: Potamidae
- Genus: Nanhaipotamon
- Species: N. macau

Binomial name
- Nanhaipotamon macau Huang, Wong & Ahyong, 2018

= Nanhaipotamon macau =

Species of crab

Nanhaipotamon macau, the Coloane hill crab, is a species of freshwater crab found solely in twelve hill streams on the island of Coloane in Macao. A member of the genus Nanhaipotamon, it was first described in December 2018 and is closely related to other land crabs such as Nanhaipotamon hongkongense.

== Discovery ==
A scientific study, commissioned by the Civic and Municipal Affairs Bureau of Macao and the University of New South Wales, was conducted in 2018 with the aim of surveying the freshwater crabs resident in the country of Macao and neighboring parts of China, as well as redescribing the Wuping Crab (Nanhaipotamon wupingense), a closely related species of land crab whose original type specimen was lost after being described in insufficient detail. One preserved specimen thought to represent the Wuping Crab, collected in Macao in 2010, was examined in the course of this study and subsequently described as an entirely new species of crab, Nanhaipotamon macau, on the basis of morphological differences between it and the Wuping Crab, which is now considered endemic to Xiaba in the province of Fujian.

== Distribution ==
The Coloane hill crab has an extremely restricted distribution encompassing 12 hill streams on the Macanese island of Coloane, occurring across approximately 5.3 square kilometres of territory (excluding sea area) of which only 3 square kilometres are believed to be occupied by the crab. Nevertheless, although not evaluated for conservation status by the IUCN, it is not considered threatened, as it is abundant throughout its habitat, none of the streams it occupies are threatened with development, the crab is not collected for food or as an aquarium specimen, and it inhabits a protected area, specifically the Ka-Ho Reservoir Freshwater Wetland.
