= Minutomon =

Scientific classification
- Domain: Eukaryota
- Kingdom: Animalia
- Phylum: Arthropoda
- Class: Malacostraca
- Order: Decapoda
- Suborder: Pleocyemata
- Infraorder: Brachyura
- Family: Potamidae
- Subfamily: Potamiscinae
- Genus: Minutomon; C.Huang, S.Y.Mao & J.R.Huang, 2014
- Species: M. shanweiense

Binomial name
- Minutomon shanweiense C.Huang, S.Y.Mao & J.R.Huang, 2014

Genus of crabs

Minutomon is a monotypic genus of freshwater crabs in the subfamily Potamiscinae, found in Shanwei, south China, and first described in 2014. The only species is Minutomon shanweiense. It superficially resembles Sinopotamon.

Minutomon is a small, 1–1.4 cm wide crab, that inhabits fast-flowing mountain streams. It is inconspicuous, rarely leaving the large rocks under which it hides. Juveniles are possibly predated by fishes such as Rhinogobius zhoui and Rhinogobius duospilus. It shares its habitat with crabs of the genus Nanhaipotamon.
