= Yuexipotamon =

Scientific classification
- Domain: Eukaryota
- Kingdom: Animalia
- Phylum: Arthropoda
- Class: Malacostraca
- Order: Decapoda
- Suborder: Pleocyemata
- Infraorder: Brachyura
- Family: Potamidae
- Subfamily: Potamiscinae
- Genus: Yuexipotamon; Huang and Mao, 2014
- Species: Y. arcophallus

Binomial name
- Yuexipotamon arcophallus Huang and Mao, 2014

Genus of crabs

Yuexipotamon is a monotypic genus of freshwater crabs in the subfamily Potamiscinae, found in the Heishiding Nature Reserve in Zhaoqing, south China, and first described in 2014. The only species is Yuexipotamon arcophallus. It superficially resembles Huananpotamon.

Yuexipotamon is a mostly aquatic, about 2 cm wide crab. The natural habitat of Yuexipotamon is small water streams or water-saturated terrain in a tropical/subtropical evergreen forest of broad-leaved plants. In daytime, it can be found under rocks on in Y-shaped burrows with two openings. It shares its habitat with other, larger potamid freshwater crab species, such as Chinapotamon depressum and Nanhaipotamon pingyuanense, that possibly prey on it.
