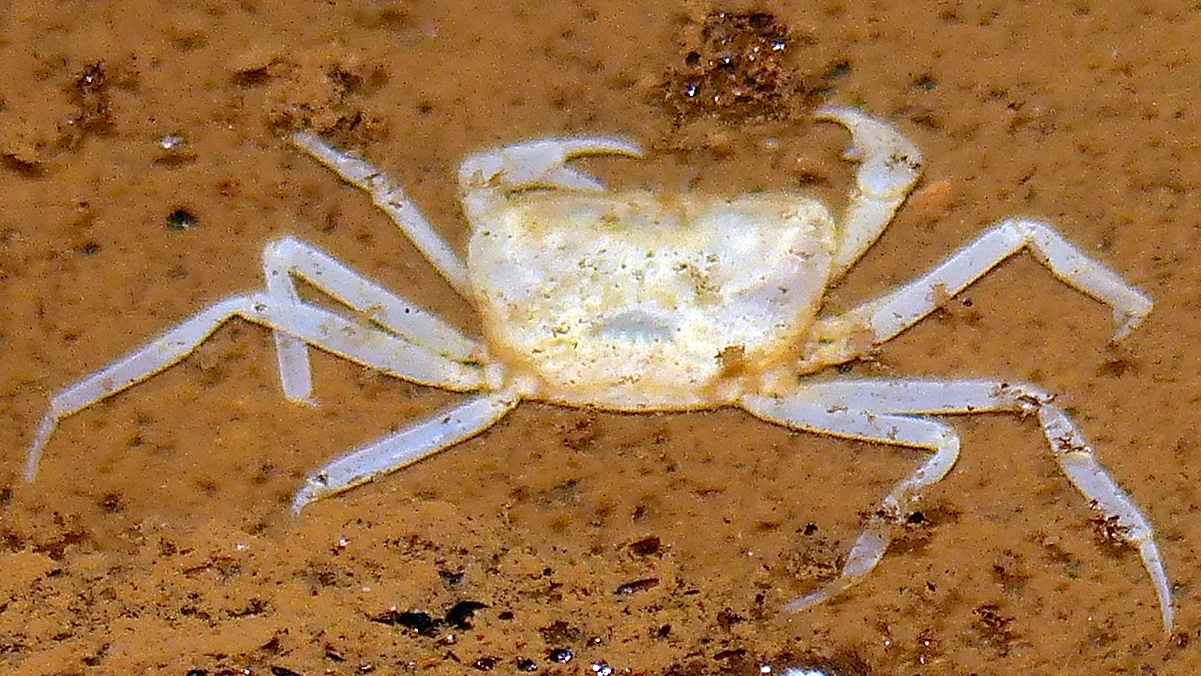
- Cerberusa caeca from Lagang Cave, Mulu NP, Sarawak (Malaysia)

Scientific classification
- Domain: Eukaryota
- Kingdom: Animalia
- Phylum: Arthropoda
- Class: Malacostraca
- Order: Decapoda
- Suborder: Pleocyemata
- Infraorder: Brachyura
- Family: Potamidae
- Subfamily: Potamiscinae
- Genus: Cerberusa; Holthuis, 1979

= Cerberusa =

Genus of crabs

Cerberusa is a genus of blind troglobite freshwater crabs, in the subfamily Potamiscinae. It has been found in caves of Borneo. Crabs of the genus Cerberusa had been originally first collected in the Deer Cave, Green Cave, Clearwater cave and Wonder Cave in Sarawak.

The species C. caeca has strongly reduced eyes, filling less than half the orbit; it was originally found only in completely dark sections of the caves. It is one of the few species of blind cave potamid crabs known, along with Diyutamon cereum and Phasmon typhlops.

The original description cites that «These crabs move very little, except when the water of their pools is disturbed, or when a bright light is shone on them, they then scuttle away. Despite their blindness, they are light sensitive. When placed in an unfamiliar container, the chelae are used constantly to explore the objects and other crabs that they contact — much as hermit crabs do when they first contact an unfamiliar gastropod shell. The rearing up — chelae outstretched threat display typical of most crabs when threatened was never seen, though they attempted to nip a finger placed on the carapace.»

== Species ==
- Cerberusa caeca Holthuis, 1979
- Cerberusa tipula Holthuis, 1979
