= Deer Cave =

Cave in Sarawak, Malaysia

Coordinates: 4.1319°N 114.9189°E

- Gua Rusa
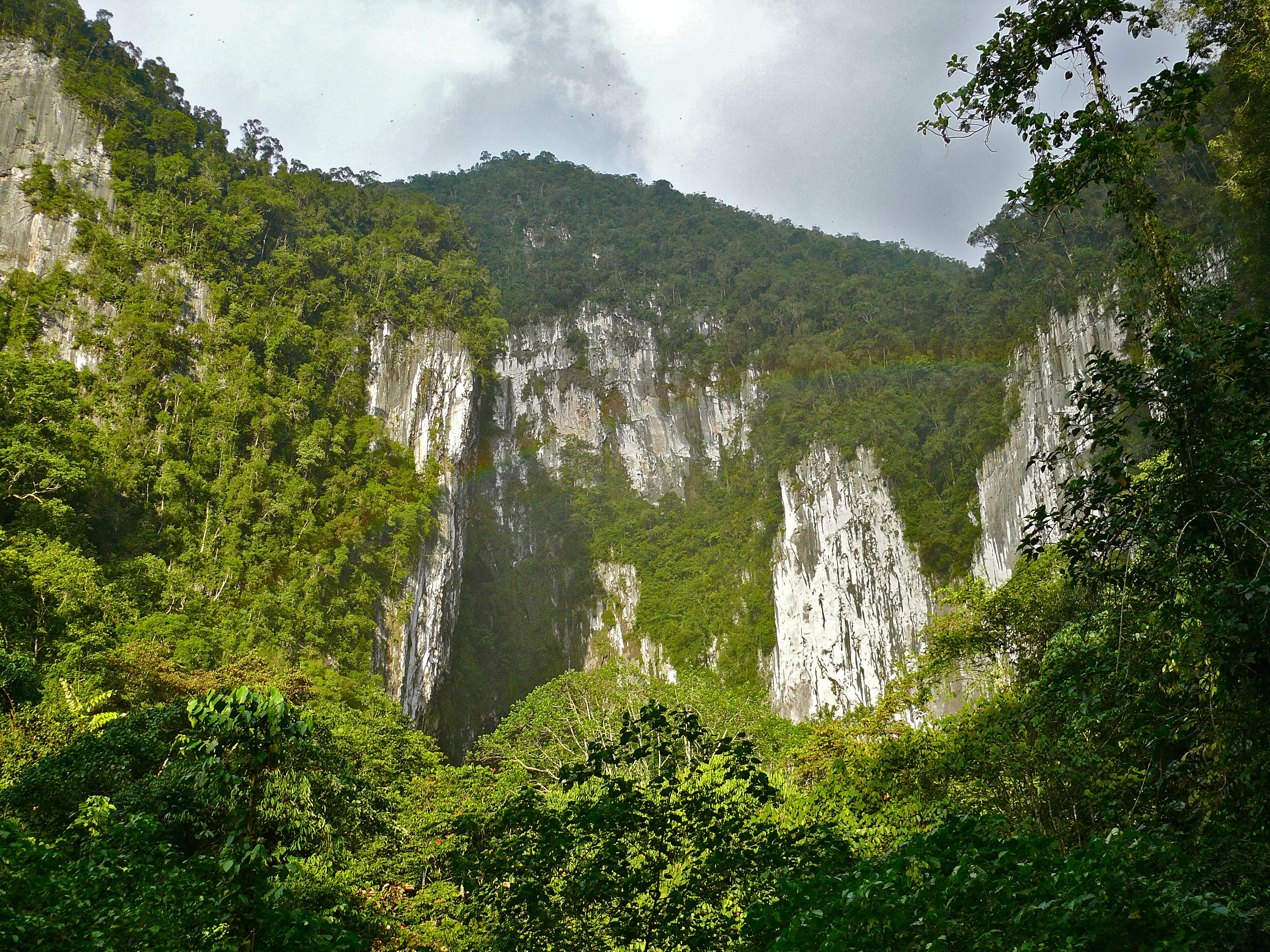
- Deer Cave entrance
- Interactive map of Deer Cave
- Location: Gunung Mulu National Park, Sarawak
- Length: 2,160 m (7,090 ft)
- Height variation: 196.64 m (645.1 ft)
- Discovery: 1961
- Entrances: 1
- Access: public
- Show cave opened: 1985
- Features: Second largest cave passage in the world; largest known before the discovery of Sơn Đoòng in 2009
- Website: Official website

Deer Cave (Malay: Gua Rusa), located near Miri, Sarawak, Malaysia, is a show cave attraction of Gunung Mulu National Park. It was surveyed in 1961 by G. E. Wilford of the British Borneo Geological Survey, who predicted that Mulu would yield many more caves in the future. The cave, which is also known as Gua Payau or Gua Rusa by the local Penan and Berawan people, is said to have received its name because of the deer that go there to lick salt-bearing rocks and shelter themselves.

== Description and survey history ==
The cave was extensively mapped by a Royal Geographical Society expedition in 1978. They produced measurements of 174 m (571 ft) wide and 122 m (400 ft) high in one section that passed through the mountain for a distance of 1 km (0.62 mi). The next survey in 2009 increased the acknowledged passage length to 4.1 km (2.5 mi) and connected Lang Cave, another show cave within the park, to the Deer Cave System. This survey, made by the Hoffman Institute at Western Kentucky University, revealed the maximum cross-sectional area to be in the large southern passage. This was documented at 169 m wide with a ceiling height of 125 m (410 ft). The northern passage registered the greatest ceiling height at 148 m (486 ft) with a cross-sectional width of 142 m (466 ft). The main entrance of Deer Cave was measured at 146 m (479 ft).

== Geologic history ==
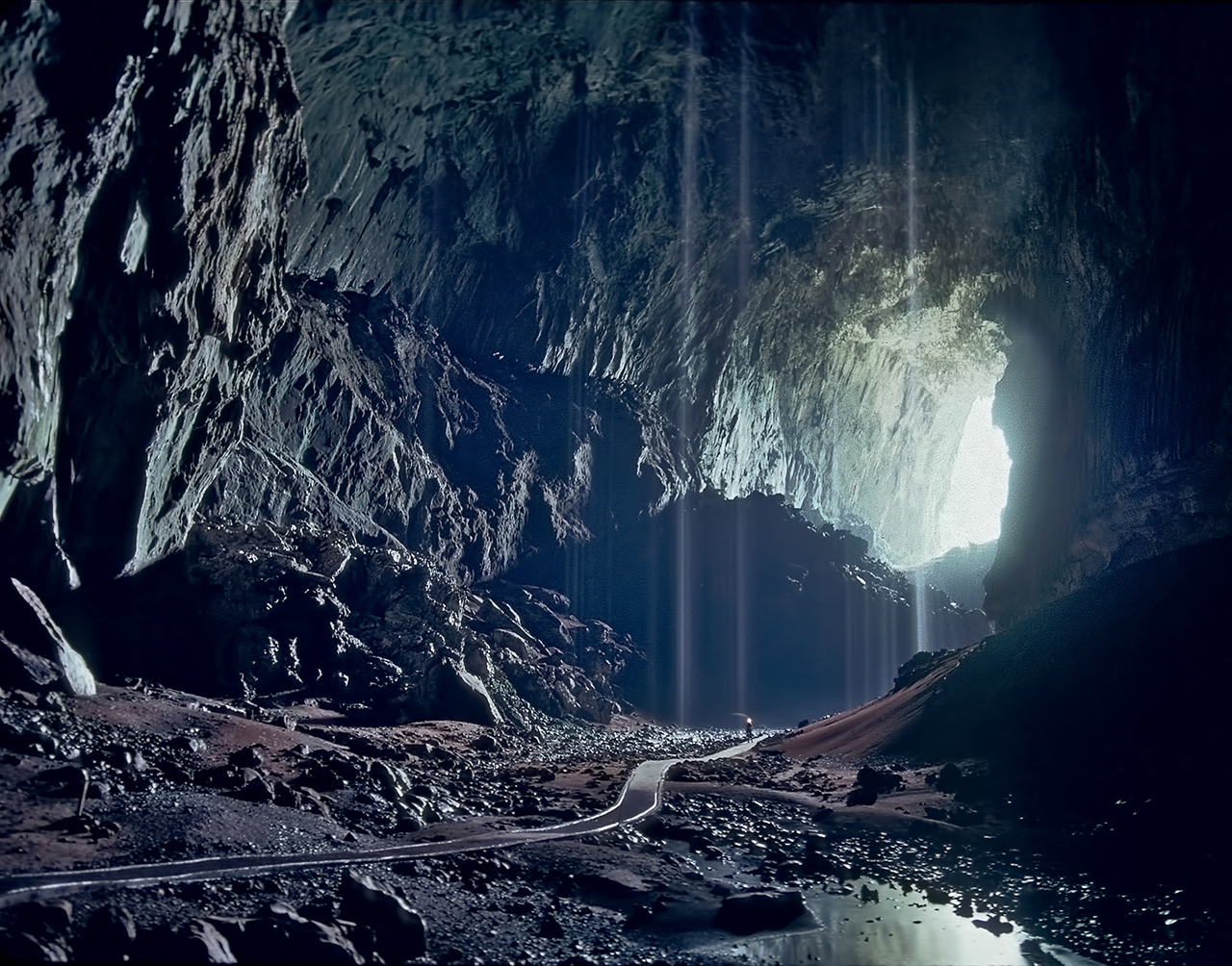
Main passage inside Deer Cave, showing waterfalls cascading from the ceiling over 122 m (400 ft) high.

An explanation of the cave's formation is strongly interconnected with the geological history of the island of Borneo itself. Between 40,000,000 BC and 20,000,000 BC, a 1,500 m (4,900 ft) thick layer of sedimentary rocks known as limestone, composed largely of compressed sea shells, developed in lagoons created by coral reefs. The movement of the Asian and Australian tectonic plates caused the crust to buckle and elevate the land once more, giving birth to the island of Borneo and the Mulu mountains, around five million years ago. Since then, the landscape was hacked by constant erosion from precipitations and winds.

The mountain’s surface is composed mostly of limestone, which dissolves when in contact with fresh water, and thus has been slowly sculpted into a karst. Rainwater also infiltrates the porous sedimentary rocks after going through the soil and progressively dissolves the limestone, widening the pores and cracks and creating caves of impressive dimensions such as the Deer Cave. This natural process, which is still working, will cause the cave to widen even more in the future.

== Access and tourism ==
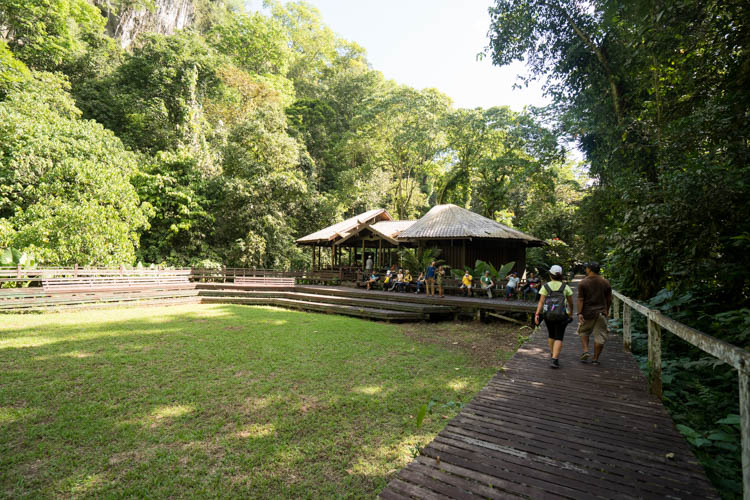
Bat observatory in front of the Deer Cave entrance.

Tourism access to the cave (and to the entire park) was opened in 1984. The landscape attracts around 25,000 visitors from countries all over the world every year.

To access Deer Cave, one must first enter the Gunung Mulu National Park, by way of Kota Kinabalu or the nearby city of Miri. Malaysia Airlines operates flights of approximately 30 minutes from Miri to Mulu. The park can also be reached by boat from Marudi, but a special booking must be made since no regular boat covers that area.

Access to Deer Cave from the National Park entrance is via a 3 km (1.9 mi) plank walkway which passes through regions of lowland and limestone tropical rainforest with immense trees and limestone outcrops. This walk is considered an additional attraction to visitors as it takes them through the rainforest (of about 55,000 ha (140,000 acres)) and by an ancient Penan Burial Cave.

Some artificial lighting is provided within the cave, but flashlights are recommended for personal use in darker areas. Visitor attention may be drawn to a specific formations - unique stalagmites and also to a specific formation near the cave entrance which bears a distinct resemblance to the profile of Abraham Lincoln.

To the northeast the cave opens into the so-called Garden of Eden, an approximately 1 km (0.62 mi) wide, circular depression encircled with 150–300 m (490–980 ft) tall limestone walls from three sides and a mountain slope from the fourth. The Garden of Eden is a karst valley or sinkhole with a volume of 150 million cubic meters, its bottom is covered with rainforest.

== Fauna ==
In 2008, Prince Albert II of Monaco visited the Gunung Mulu National Park to launch a new camera system as part of the Bat Observatory, which is located near the entrance of the Deer Cave. Known as the Bat Cam, the surveillance technology allows visitors and scientists to observe approximately 3 million bats (over 30 species) that live inside the Deer Cave without affecting their habitat or habits, providing a valuable tool for the study of cave fauna. A viewing area has also been built outside, below the cave entrance, so that visitors can view the nightly "bat exodus" as they exit the cave and stream away in tight formation.

At least 12 bat species are found in Deer Cave.

- Cave nectar bat (Eonycteris spelaea)
- Greater sheath-tailed bat (Emballonura alecto)
- Bornean horseshoe bat (Rhinolophus borneensis)
- Philippine horseshoe bat (Rhinolophus philippinensis)
- Cantor's roundleaf bat (Hipposideros galeritus)
- Fawn roundleaf bat (Hipposideros cervinus)
- Dayak roundleaf bat (Hipposideros dyacorum)
- Diadem roundleaf bat (Hipposideros diadema)
- Lesser tail-less roundleaf bat (Coelops robinsoni)
- Lesser bentwing bat (Miniopterus australis)
- Naked bat (Cheiromeles torquatus)
- Free-tail or wrinkle-lipped bat (Mops plicatus)

Deer Cave derives its name from the sambar deer (Cervus unicolor), an uncommon species of deer native to Malaysia, which make their home largely in the immediate area of the cave. Additionally, many other animals such as the rhinoceros hornbill, bearded pig, sun bear, and gibbon are native to the local area.

It hosts also troglobiont freshwater crabs of the genus Cerberusa.

== Surroundings ==
Deer Cave was believed to be the largest cave passage in the world until the discovery of Sơn Đoòng cave in Phong Nha-Kẻ Bàng National Park in Vietnam in 2009. It is part of the Gunung Mulu National Park, a UNESCO World Heritage Site characterised by amazing caves and karst formations in a mountainous equatorial rainforest setting.

The Clearwater cave, with approximately 60 km (37 mi) of known passages, is considered the longest cave system in Southeast Asia. It is recognised for its clear underground stream, popular with tourists. The Wind cave is located on the same trail leading to Clearwater cave, and is known for its blowing wind. It contains a chamber dubbed King’s Room, a cavern containing huge columns of stone on both the ceiling and the floor. The Lang cave is the smallest of the caves open to the public. However, its size allows up-close opportunities to see some of the common cave inhabitants such as bats and swiftlets.
