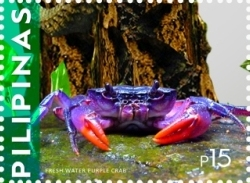
- Insulamon palawanense on a 2015 stamp of the Philippines

Scientific classification
- Domain: Eukaryota
- Kingdom: Animalia
- Phylum: Arthropoda
- Class: Malacostraca
- Order: Decapoda
- Suborder: Pleocyemata
- Infraorder: Brachyura
- Family: Potamidae
- Genus: Insulamon
- Species: I. palawanense

Binomial name
- Insulamon palawanense Freitag, 2012

= Insulamon palawanense =

Species of crab

Insulamon palawanense, or the Palawan purple crab is a species of freshwater crab from the Philippines described in 2012. They are 2.5–5.3 centimetres (1.0–2.1 in) wide and are a striking purple colour.

== History ==
The species was described by Hendrik Freitag of the Senckenberg Museum of Zoology in Dresden, Germany, having previously been included in a wider circumscription of I. unicorn. The species is endemic to the island of Palawan, where it has a wide distribution. The striking iridescent purple coloration may help the crabs to recognise others of its species, or may serve no purpose.
