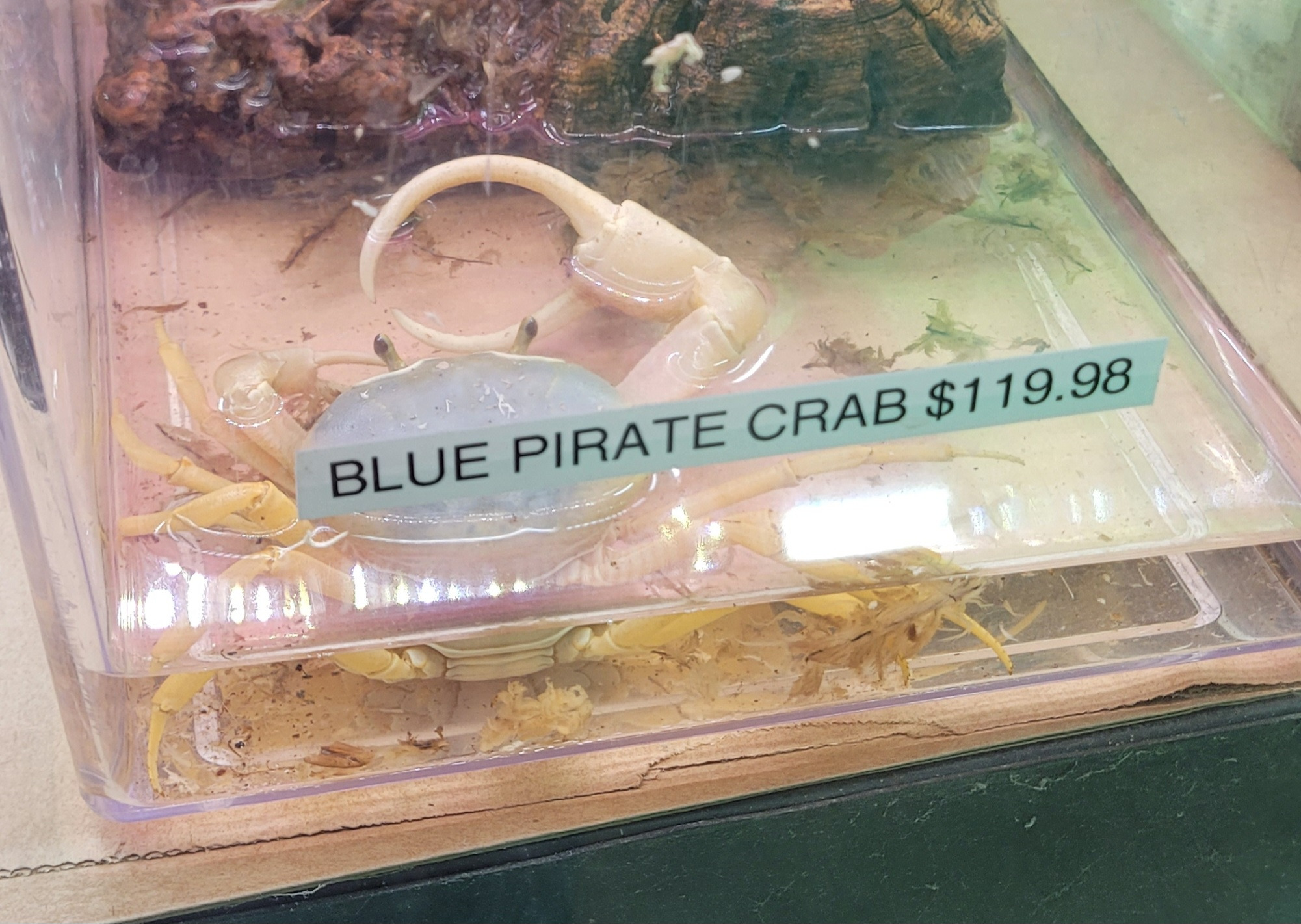
- Blue pirate crab for sale in a United States pet store

Scientific classification
- Domain: Eukaryota
- Kingdom: Animalia
- Phylum: Arthropoda
- Class: Malacostraca
- Order: Decapoda
- Suborder: Pleocyemata
- Infraorder: Brachyura
- Family: Potamidae
- Genus: Vietorientalia
- Species: V. rubra

Binomial name
- Vietorientalia rubra Đăng & Trần, 1992

Synonyms
- Orientalia rubra; Hainanpotamon rubrum

= Vietorientalia rubra =

Species of crab

Vietorientalia rubra, formerly known as Hainanpotamon rubrum and Orientalia rubra, is an extant species of freshwater crab native to Vietnam. Although many of the individuals currently for sale are wild caught, there has been some success with breeding these crabs in captivity.
