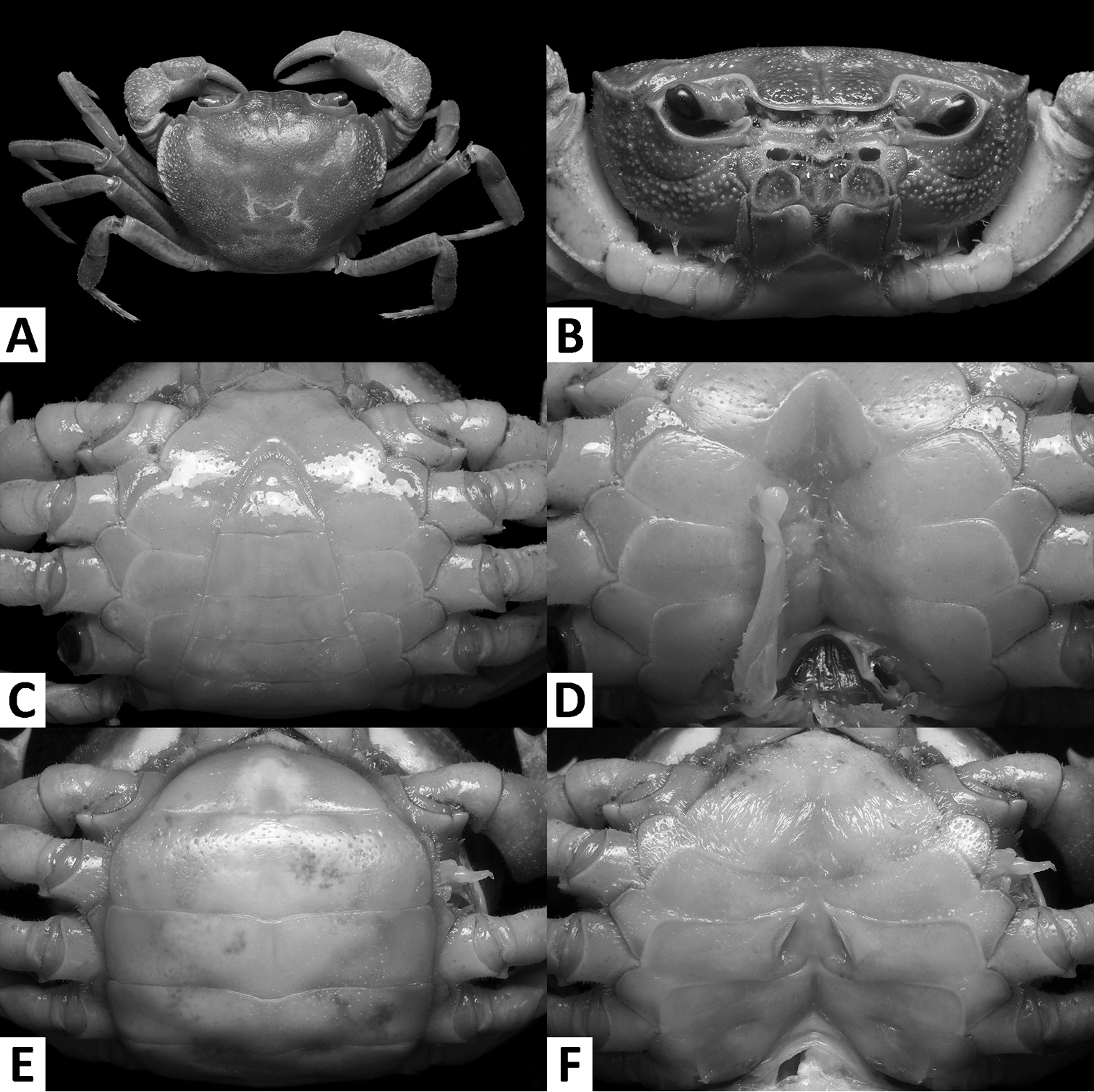

Scientific classification
- Kingdom: Animalia
- Phylum: Arthropoda
- Class: Malacostraca
- Order: Decapoda
- Suborder: Pleocyemata
- Infraorder: Brachyura
- Family: Potamidae
- Genus: Nanhaipotamon
- Species: N. wupingense

Binomial name
- Nanhaipotamon wupingense Y.-Z. Cheng, W.-C. Yang, Zhong & L. Li, 2003

= Nanhaipotamon wupingense =

Species of crab

Nanhaipotamon wupingense, the Wuping crab, is a species of freshwater crab in the genus Nanhaipotamon, known only to inhabit the locality of Xiaba in Wuping County, Fujian Province, China, and formerly believed to have a disjunct population in Macao. First described in 2003, the type specimen was subsequently lost, and with the crab not having been described initially in sufficient detail, an effort was made in 2018 to redescribe the species using a specimen collected in Macao. This study, however, concluded that the Macao population was actually a different species, Nanhaipotamon macau, endemic to the country.
