= Terrapotamon =

Scientific classification
- Kingdom: Animalia
- Phylum: Arthropoda
- Class: Malacostraca
- Order: Decapoda
- Suborder: Pleocyemata
- Infraorder: Brachyura
- Family: Potamidae
- Genus: Terrapotamon; Ng, 1996

Type species
- Terrapotamon abbotti Rathbun, 1898

Species
- T. abbotti; T. longitarsus; T. palian; T. phaibuli; T. thungwa

Genus of crabs

Terrapotamon, derived from the Latin word terra, meaning "land", and the Greek word ποταμός (potamós), meaning "river", is a genus in the freshwater crab family, Potamidae, as well as in the subfamily, Potamiscinae.

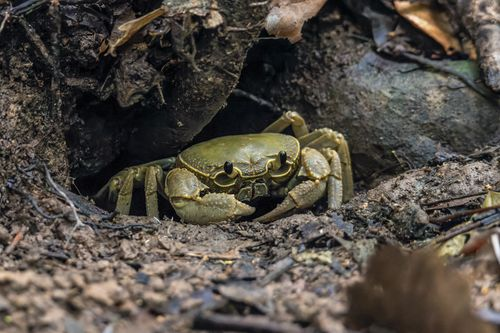
Terrapotamon phaibuli

== Description ==
Freshwater crabs in the genus Terrapotamon are terrestrial and endemic to Thailand and the Malay Peninsula.

Members in this genus can be distinguished from related genera found in the same locales by a raised carapace, inflation of the branchial and sub-branchial regions, acutely triangular external orbital angles, and either the absence of a flagellum on the exopod of the third maxilliped, among other features. First male gonopods are usually tapered and conically shaped, with tightly appressed ventral and dorsal folds.

Different species in the genus Terrapotamon vary in size. Adult T. abbotti specimens can reach carapace lengths of up to 45mm, while adult T. palian specimens, for instance, only grow to as large as 25mm.

Different species also have different habits and niches, with some preferring moister habitats than others; T. longitarsus and T. thungwa are known to live in karst landscapes among rocks and crevices. Their long appendages seem to have evolved to adapt to these environments, allowing these species to be more agile when climbing on rocks. Other Terrapotamon species live in typical forest habitats, digging burrows in the soil for shelter.

== Taxonomy ==
The genus Terrapotamon was first introduced in 1986 by Singaporean carcinologist and ichthyologist at the National University of Singapore, Peter Ng Kee Lin, in Volume 20 of the Journal of Natural History. The type species was designated as Terrapotamon abbotti by Mary J. Rathbun in 1898.

== Species ==
The genus includes the following five species:

- Terrapotamon abboti (Rathbun, 1898)
- Terrapotamon longitarsus (Lheknim & Ng, 2016)
- Terrapotamon palian (Ng & Naiyenetr, 1998)
- Terrapotamon phaibuli (Leelawathanagoon, Lheknim & Ng, 2010)
- Terrapotamon thungwa (Promdam, Yeesin & Ng, 2017)
