= Insulamon =

Scientific classification
- Domain: Eukaryota
- Kingdom: Animalia
- Phylum: Arthropoda
- Class: Malacostraca
- Order: Decapoda
- Suborder: Pleocyemata
- Infraorder: Brachyura
- Family: Potamidae
- Subfamily: Potamiscinae
- Genus: Insulamon; Ng & Takeda, 1992

Type species
- Insulamon unicorn Ng & Takeda, 1992

Species
- Insulamon johannchristiani Freitag, 2012; Insulamon magnum Freitag, 2012; Insulamon palawanense Freitag, 2012; Insulamon porculum Freitag, 2012; Insulamon unicorn Ng & Takeda, 1992

Genus of crabs

Insulamon is genus of freshwater crabs, comprising four species:

- Insulamon unicorn Ng & Takeda, 1992
- Insulamon palawanense Freitag, 2012
- Insulamon magnum Freitag, 2012
- Insulamon johannchristiani Freitag, 2012
