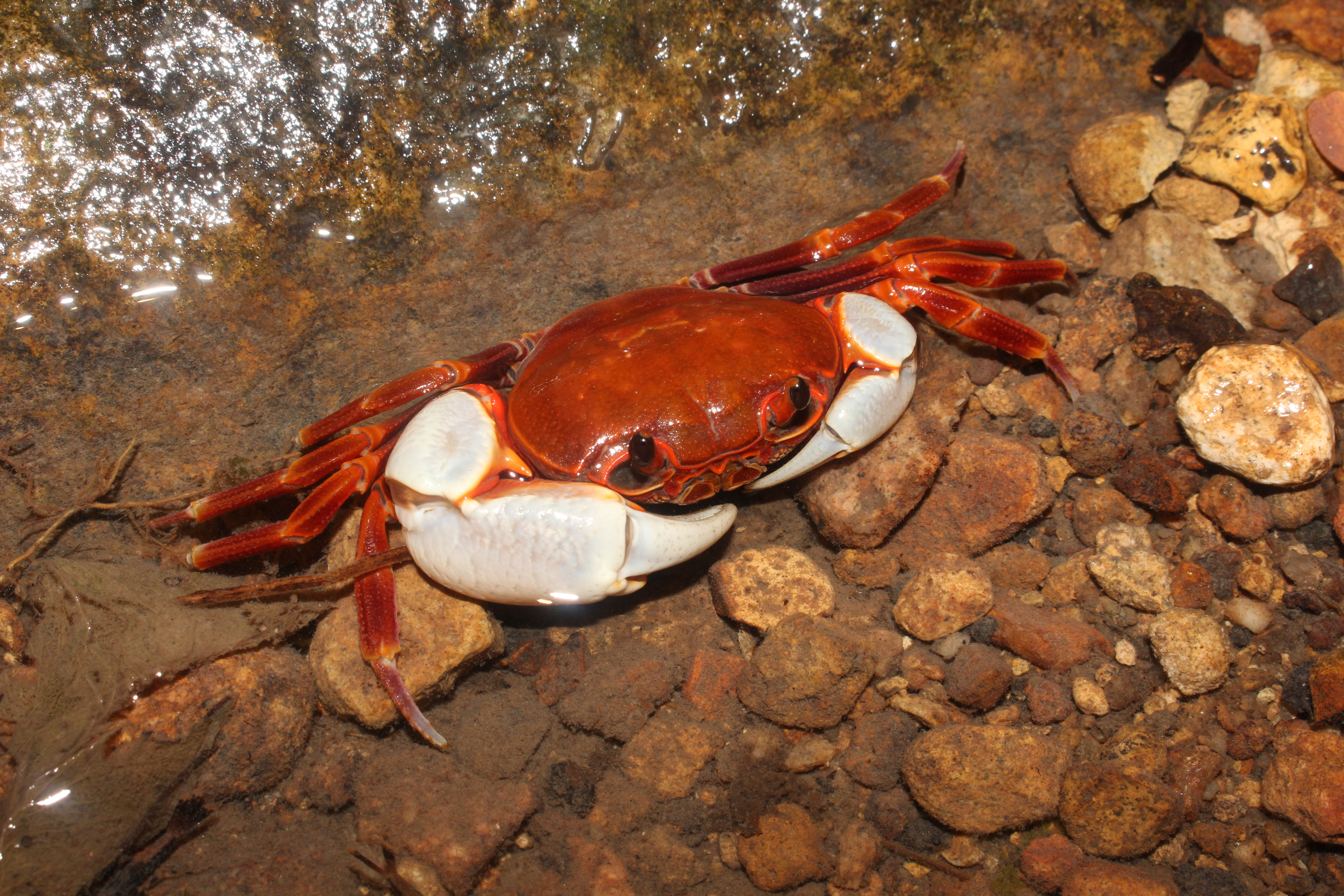

Conservation status
- Least Concern (IUCN 3.1)

Scientific classification
- Kingdom: Animalia
- Phylum: Arthropoda
- Class: Malacostraca
- Order: Decapoda
- Suborder: Pleocyemata
- Infraorder: Brachyura
- Family: Potamidae
- Genus: Nanhaipotamon
- Species: N. hongkongense

Binomial name
- Nanhaipotamon hongkongense (Shen, 1940)

= Nanhaipotamon hongkongense =

Species of crab

Nanhaipotamon hongkongense is a species of freshwater crab of the genus Nanhaipotamon, known to occur in Hong Kong (Hong Kong Island, New Territories, Lantau Island and a few smaller islands) and adjacent areas in Shenzhen and Dongguan, Mainland China.

== Description and life history ==
Nanhaipotamon hongkongense is a burrowing species that digs burrows into muddy banks of small rivers and creeks or moist soil. It is a nocturnal species that mostly stays in its burrow during the day and comes out at night or after heavy rainfalls. Offspring hatch as miniature versions of adult crabs after direct development, like with all potamid crabs.

== Distribution and habitat ==
This species is semiterrestrial and inhabits the banks of hillstreams, but can also be found in places far away from running water, such as moist areas were groundwater seeps through the soil, generally in secondary evergreen broadleaf forests. Whereas adults are rarely reported from actual aquatic habitats, juveniles and small adults may be found under stones or leaves in small ditches, creeks and ponds. N. hongkongense occurs from 17 to 514 meters above sea level. Although it has been known to tolerate certain amounts of pollution, such as plastic trash, it is not abundant in modified landscapes and in or close to densely populated human settlements, there is, however, anecdotal evidence of single crabs in schools and residential areas. First considered to be a Hong Kong endemic, it was recorded from cities bordering Hong Kong, namely Shenzhen and Dongguan.

== Conservation ==
As of 2008, N. hongkongense is assessed to be "Least Concern" by the IUCN, Major threats to the species include habitat destruction and pollution. Researchers reckon that there may exist several isolated sub-populations due to habitat fragmentation, since many natural water courses have been piped or channelized in their downstream sections. The close proximity of habitats with large cities and the expected growth of them may put pressure on existing populations in the future. Currently, N. hongkongense is present in several protected areas in Hong Kong.

== See also ==
- Species first discovered in Hong Kong
