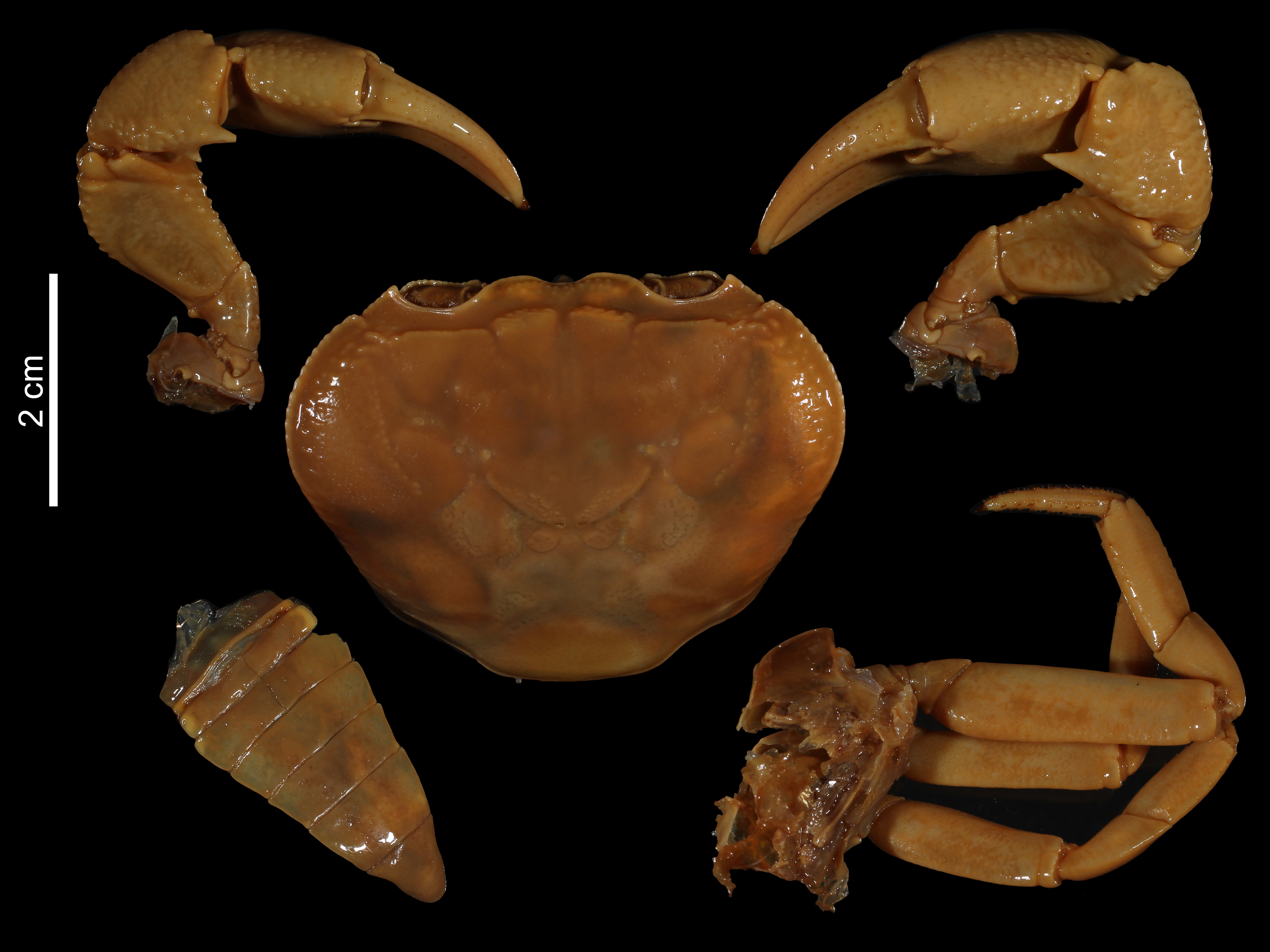
- Neolarnaudia botti

Scientific classification
- Kingdom: Animalia
- Phylum: Arthropoda
- Clade: Pancrustacea
- Class: Malacostraca
- Order: Decapoda
- Suborder: Pleocyemata
- Infraorder: Brachyura
- Family: Potamidae
- Subfamily: Potamiscinae
- Genus: Neolarnaudia; Türkay & Naiyanetr (1987)

= Neolarnaudia =

Genus of crabs

Neolarnaudia is a genus of freshwater crabs, in the subfamily Potamiscinae and found in Vietnam. Data are deficient concerning their IUCN Red List of Threatened Species status.

== Species ==
- Neolarnaudia botti Türkay & Naiyanetr, 1987
- Neolarnaudia phymatodes (Kemp, 1923)
