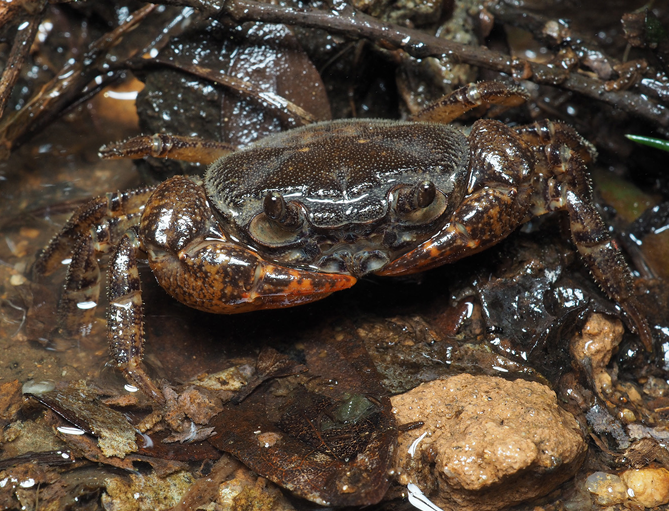

Scientific classification
- Domain: Eukaryota
- Kingdom: Animalia
- Phylum: Arthropoda
- Class: Malacostraca
- Order: Decapoda
- Suborder: Pleocyemata
- Infraorder: Brachyura
- Family: Potamidae
- Genus: Qianguimon
- Species: Q. yuzhouense

Binomial name
- Qianguimon yuzhouense Wang, Zhang & Zou, 2020

= Qianguimon yuzhouense =

Species of crab

Qianguimon yuzhouense is a species of crab in the family Potamidae.
