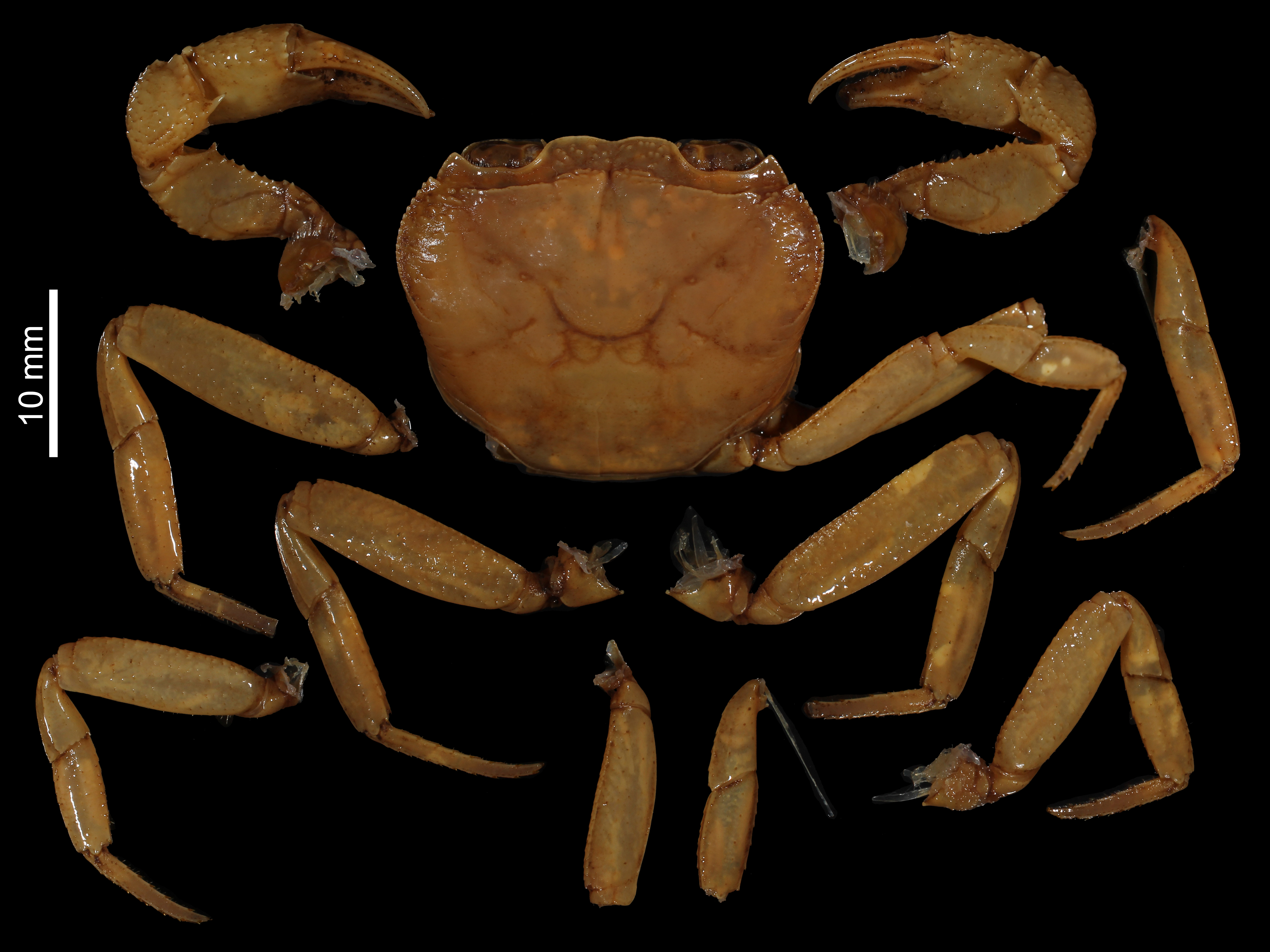
- Eosamon brousmichei

Scientific classification
- Domain: Eukaryota
- Kingdom: Animalia
- Phylum: Arthropoda
- Class: Malacostraca
- Order: Decapoda
- Suborder: Pleocyemata
- Infraorder: Brachyura
- Family: Potamidae
- Subfamily: Potamiscinae
- Genus: Eosamon; Yeo & Ng (2007)

= Eosamon =

Genus of crabs

Eosamon is a genus of freshwater crabs in the subfamily Potamiscinae, found in East and South-East Asia.

== Species ==
- Eosamon boonyaratae (Naiyanetr, 1987)
- Eosamon brousmichei (Rathbun, 1904): Vietnam
- Eosamon hafniense (Bott, 1966)
- Eosamon lushuiense (Dai & G.-X. Chen, 1985)
- Eosamon nominathuis Yeo, 2010
- Eosamon paludosum (Rathbun, 1904)
- Eosamon phuphanense (Naiyanetr, 1992)
- Eosamon smithianum (Kemp, 1923)
- Eosamon tengchongense (Dai & G.-X. Chen, 1985)
- Eosamon tumidum (Wood-Mason, 1871)
- Eosamon yotdomense (Naiyanetr, 1984)
