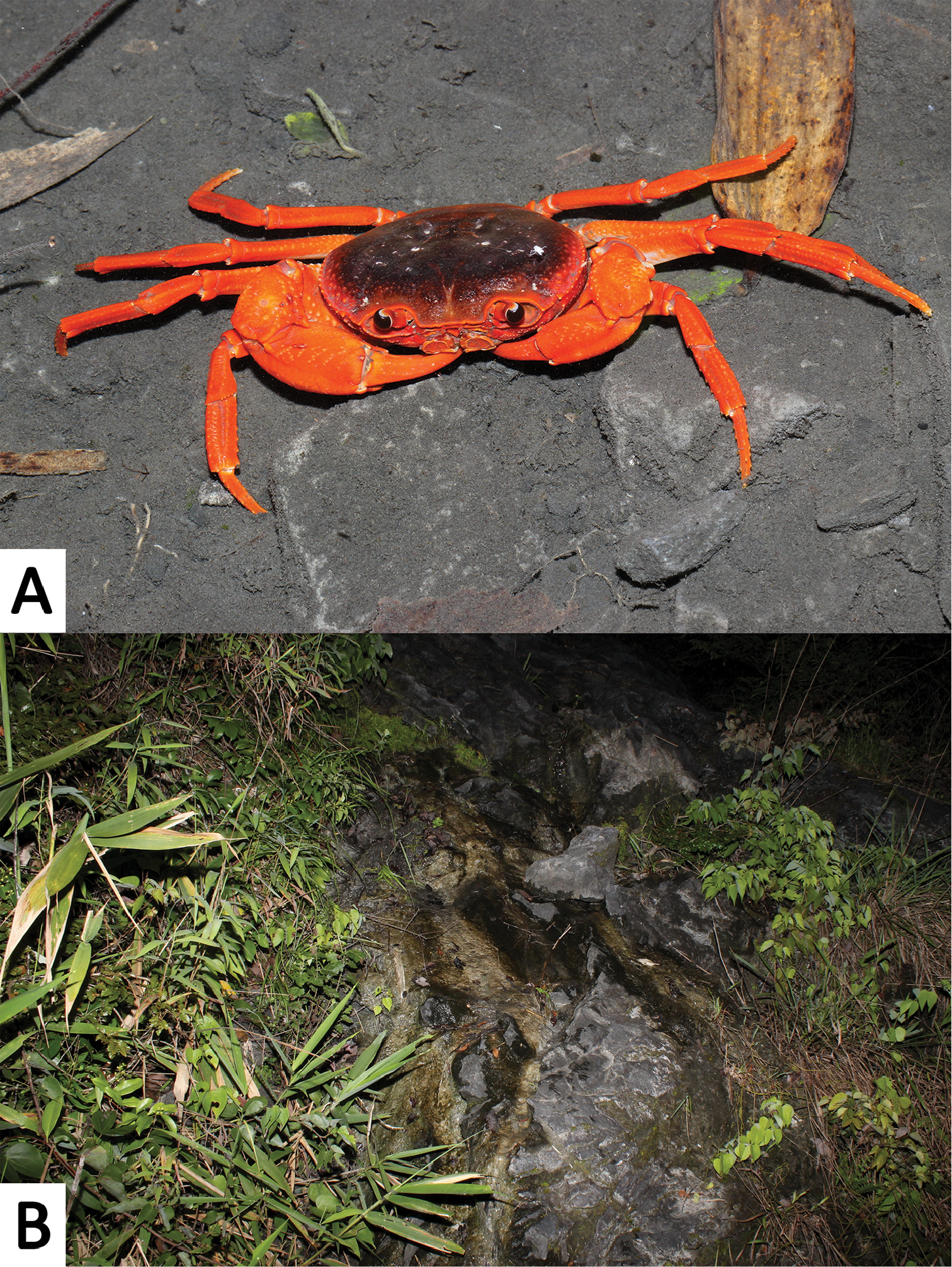
- A male Yuebeipotamon calciatile

Scientific classification
- Domain: Eukaryota
- Kingdom: Animalia
- Phylum: Arthropoda
- Class: Malacostraca
- Order: Decapoda
- Suborder: Pleocyemata
- Infraorder: Brachyura
- Family: Potamidae
- Genus: Yuebeipotamon; Huang, Shih & Mao, 2016
- Species: Y. calciatile

Binomial name
- Yuebeipotamon calciatile Huang, Shih & Mao, 2016

= Yuebeipotamon =

Genus of crabs

Yuebeipotamon calciatile is a species of potamid crab from hill streams and pools in north Guangdong, China. Although essentially a freshwater crab, its long legs are believed to allow it to easily walk over land between streams. It was first discovered in a Chinese pet market. It is the only species in the genus Yuebeipotamon. The legs and claws are bright red to purplish and the carapace, which typically is between 17 and 41 mm (0.7–1.6 in) wide, is mainly maroon to dark brown.
