= Qianguimon =

Scientific classification
- Kingdom: Animalia
- Phylum: Arthropoda
- Class: Malacostraca
- Order: Decapoda
- Suborder: Pleocyemata
- Infraorder: Brachyura
- Family: Potamidae
- Subfamily: Potamiscinae
- Genus: Qianguimon; Huang, 2018

Genus of crabs

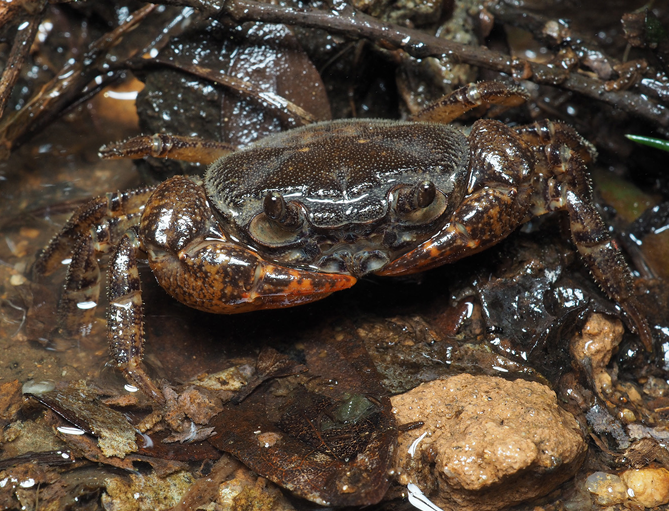

Qianguimon is a genus of freshwater or semiterrestrial crabs endemic to Southern China, containing the following species.

- Qianguimon aflagellum Dai, Song, Li & Liang, 1980
- Qianguimon elongatum Huang, 2018
- Qianguimon rongxianense Wang, Huang & Zou, 2019
- Qianguimon splendidum Huang, 2018
- Qianguimon yuzhouense Wang, Zhang & Zou, 2020
