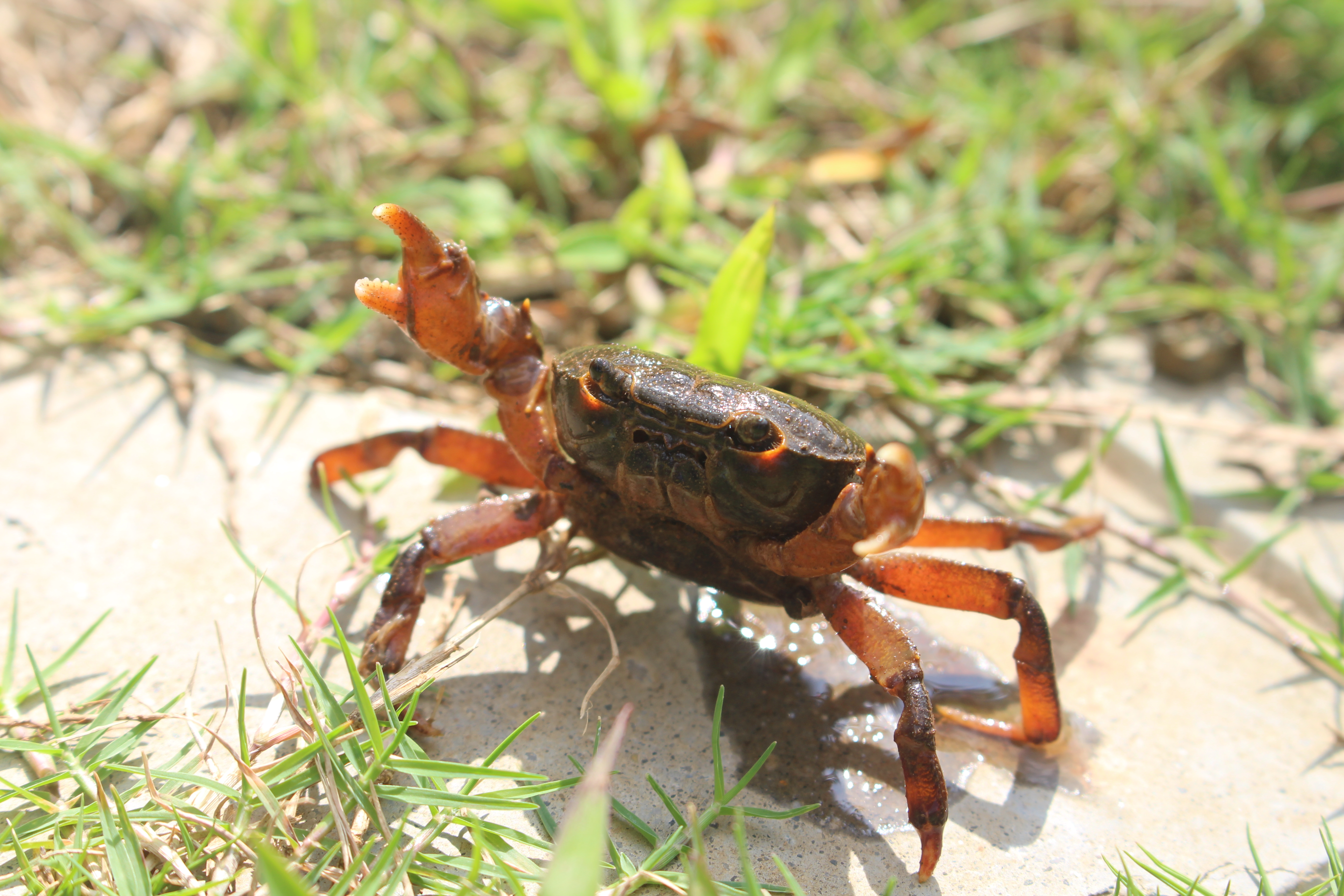

Scientific classification
- Domain: Eukaryota
- Kingdom: Animalia
- Phylum: Arthropoda
- Class: Malacostraca
- Order: Decapoda
- Suborder: Pleocyemata
- Infraorder: Brachyura
- Family: Potamidae
- Subfamily: Potamiscinae
- Genus: Arquatopotamon; Chu, Zhou & Sun, 2017
- Species: A. jizushanense

Binomial name
- Arquatopotamon jizushanense Chu, Zhou & Sun, 2017

= Arquatopotamon =

Genus of crabs

Arquatopotamon jizushanense is a freshwater crab species found in Yunnan, China, and the only species of the genus Arquatopotamon. Its carapace is normally darkish brown and the walking legs and chelipeds more reddish brown.

== Range and habitat ==
Arquatopotamon jizushanense was described 2017 by Chu, Zhou & Sun and is only known from the type locality, few small hill streams in Jizushan Town, Binchuan County, Dali City, at an altitude of 1778 meters above sea level.
