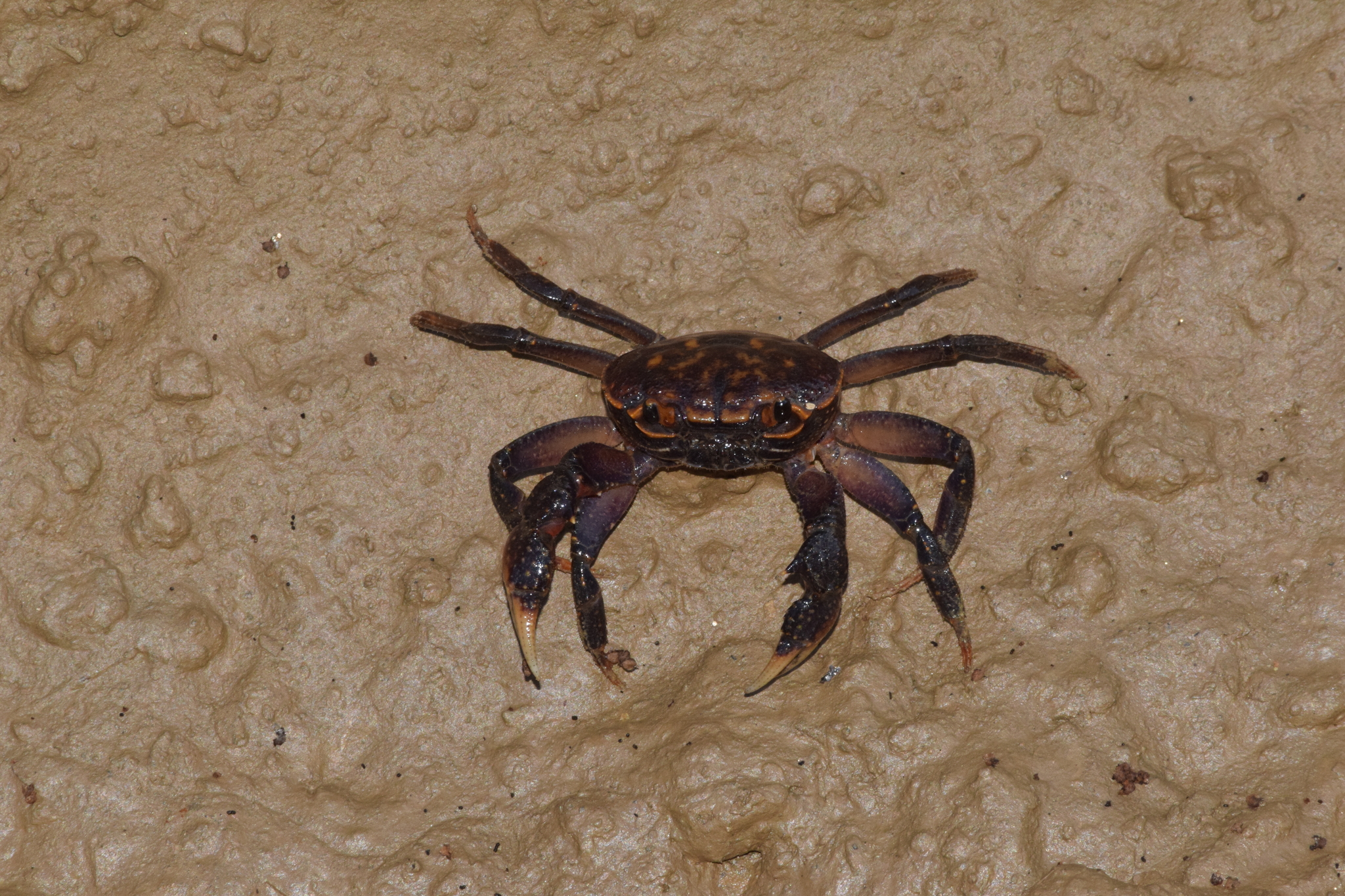
- Potamiscus palelense

Scientific classification
- Domain: Eukaryota
- Kingdom: Animalia
- Phylum: Arthropoda
- Class: Malacostraca
- Order: Decapoda
- Suborder: Pleocyemata
- Infraorder: Brachyura
- Family: Potamidae
- Subfamily: Potamiscinae
- Genus: Potamiscus; Alcock, 1909

Synonyms:
- Potamicus Alcock, 1909; Ranguna Bott, 1966

= Potamiscus =

Genus of freshwater crabs

External image
- Images at iNaturalist

Potamiscus is the type genus of freshwater crabs in the subfamily Potamiscinae: recorded from Asian countries including China and Vietnam.

== Species ==
The Global Biodiversity Information Facility lists:

1. Potamiscus annandalii Alcock, 1909 - type species
2. Potamiscus cangyuanensis Dai, 1999
3. Potamiscus chizami Pati, 2021
4. Potamiscus crassus Naruse, Chia & Zhou, 2018
5. Potamiscus decourcyi (Kemp, 1913)
6. Potamiscus elaphrius Dai & Chen, 1990
7. Potamiscus fumariatus Naruse, Chia & Zhou, 2018
8. Potamiscus loshingense (Wu, 1934)
9. Potamiscus loshingensis (HW Wu, 1934)
10. Potamiscus mima Pati, 2021
11. Potamiscus montosus Dai, Song, He, Cao, Xu & Zhong, 1975
12. Potamiscus motuoense Dai, 1990
13. Potamiscus motuoensis Dai, 1990
14. Potamiscus palelense Mitra & Waikhom, 2019
15. Potamiscus rangoonense (Rathbun, 1904)
16. Potamiscus rangoonensis (Rathbun, 1904)
17. Potamiscus rongjingense Dai, Chen, Liu, Luo, Yi, Liu, Gu & Liu, 1990
18. Potamiscus rongjingensis Dai & Chen, 1990
19. Potamiscus takedai Pati, Mitra & Ng, 2020
20. Potamiscus tumidulus (Alcock, 1909)
21. Potamiscus whitteni Ng, Hla Htoo & Win Mar, 2020
22. Potamiscus yiwuensis Dai & Cai, 1998
23. Potamiscus yongshengense Dai & Chen, 1985
24. Potamiscus yongshengensis Dai & Chen, 1985
25. Potamiscus yunnanensis (Kemp, 1924)
