= Indochinamon =

Scientific classification
- Domain: Eukaryota
- Kingdom: Animalia
- Phylum: Arthropoda
- Class: Malacostraca
- Order: Decapoda
- Suborder: Pleocyemata
- Infraorder: Brachyura
- Family: Potamidae
- Subfamily: Potamiscinae
- Genus: Indochinamon; Yeo & Ng (2007)

Genus of crabs

External image
- Images at iNaturalist

Indochinamon is a genus of freshwater crabs, typically found in the Indo-China region.

== Species ==
- Indochinamon andersonianum (Wood-Mason, 1871)
- Indochinamon asperatum (Alcock, 1909)
- Indochinamon bavi Naruse, Nguyen & Yeo, 2011
- Indochinamon beieri (Pretzmann, 1966)
- Indochinamon bhumibol (Naiyanetr, 2001)
- Indochinamon boshanense (Dai & G.-X. Chen, 1985)
- Indochinamon changpoense (Dai, 1995)
- Indochinamon chinghungense (Dai, Y. Z. Song, He, Cao, Z. B. Xu & Zhong, 1975)
- Indochinamon cua (Yeo & Ng, 1998)
- Indochinamon dangi Naruse, Nguyen & Yeo, 2011
- Indochinamon daweishanense (Dai, 1995)
- Indochinamon edwardsii (Wood-Mason, 1871)
- Indochinamon flexum (Dai, Y. Z. Song, L. L. Li & Liang, 1980)
- Indochinamon gengmaense (Dai, 1995)
- Indochinamon guttum (Yeo & Ng, 1998)
- Indochinamon hirtum (Alcock, 1909)
- Indochinamon hispidum (Wood-Mason, 1871)
- Indochinamon jianchuanense (Dai & G.-X. Chen, 1985)
- Indochinamon jinpingense (Dai, 1995)
- Indochinamon kimboiense (Dang, 1975)
- Indochinamon lipkei (Ng & Naiyanetr, 1993)
- Indochinamon manipurense (Alcock, 1909)
- Indochinamon menglaense (Dai & Cai, 1998)
- Indochinamon mieni (Dang, 1967)
- Indochinamon orleansi (Rathbun, 1904)
- Indochinamon ou (Yeo & Ng, 1998)
- Indochinamon phongnha Naruse, Nguyen & Yeo, 2011
- Indochinamon prolatum (Brandis, 2000)
- Indochinamon tannanti (Rathbun, 1904)
- Indochinamon tritum (Alcock, 1909)
- Indochinamon villosum (Yeo & Ng, 1998)
- Indochinamon xinpingense (Dai & Bo, 1994)
- Indochinamon yunlongense (Dai, 1995)
