= Himalayapotamon atkinsonianum =

Conservation status
- Least Concern (IUCN 3.1)

Scientific classification
- Kingdom: Animalia
- Phylum: Arthropoda
- Clade: Pancrustacea
- Class: Malacostraca
- Order: Decapoda
- Suborder: Pleocyemata
- Infraorder: Brachyura
- Family: Potamidae
- Genus: Himalayapotamon
- Species: H. atkinsonianum

Binomial name
- Himalayapotamon atkinsonianum (Wood-Mason, 1871)

Synonyms
- Potamon atkinsonianum (Wood-Mason, 1871); Potamon (Himalayapotamon) atkinsonianum subsp. janetscheki Pretzmann, 1966; Telphusa atkinsoniana Wood-Mason, 1871 (basionym)

Species of freshwater crab

Himalayapotamon atkinsonianum is a species of freshwater crab in the family Potamidae. It is found in Nepal and parts of Northeastern India. It can be distinguished from other related species by the morphology of its gonopods.
