= Lophopotamon =

Conservation status
- Data Deficient (IUCN 3.1)

Scientific classification
- Domain: Eukaryota
- Kingdom: Animalia
- Phylum: Arthropoda
- Class: Malacostraca
- Order: Decapoda
- Suborder: Pleocyemata
- Infraorder: Brachyura
- Family: Potamidae
- Genus: Lophopotamon; Dai, 1999
- Species: L. yenyuanense

Binomial name
- Lophopotamon yenyuanense (Dai et al., 1990)

Genus of crabs

Lophopotamon is a genus of freshwater crab in the family Potamidae, containing only a single species, L. yenyuanense.

== Distribution & habitat ==
Lophopotamon yenyuanense lives in rivers and streams in China's inland wetlands of Yanyuan.

== Conservation ==
The species is currently classified as "Data Deficient" by the IUCN Red List, as its population size is unknown.
