= Vietopotamon =

Scientific classification
- Kingdom: Animalia
- Phylum: Arthropoda
- Clade: Pancrustacea
- Class: Malacostraca
- Order: Decapoda
- Suborder: Pleocyemata
- Infraorder: Brachyura
- Family: Potamidae
- Subfamily: Potamiscinae
- Genus: Vietopotamon; Dang & Hô (2002)

Genus of crabs

Vietopotamon is a genus of freshwater crabs, recorded from Thailand (V. phuluangense) and Vietnam (V. aluoiense). Both are known from single localities and are on the IUCN Red List of Threatened Species.

== Species ==
- Vietopotamon aluoiense Dang & Hô, 2002
- Vietopotamon phuluangense (Bott, 1970)
