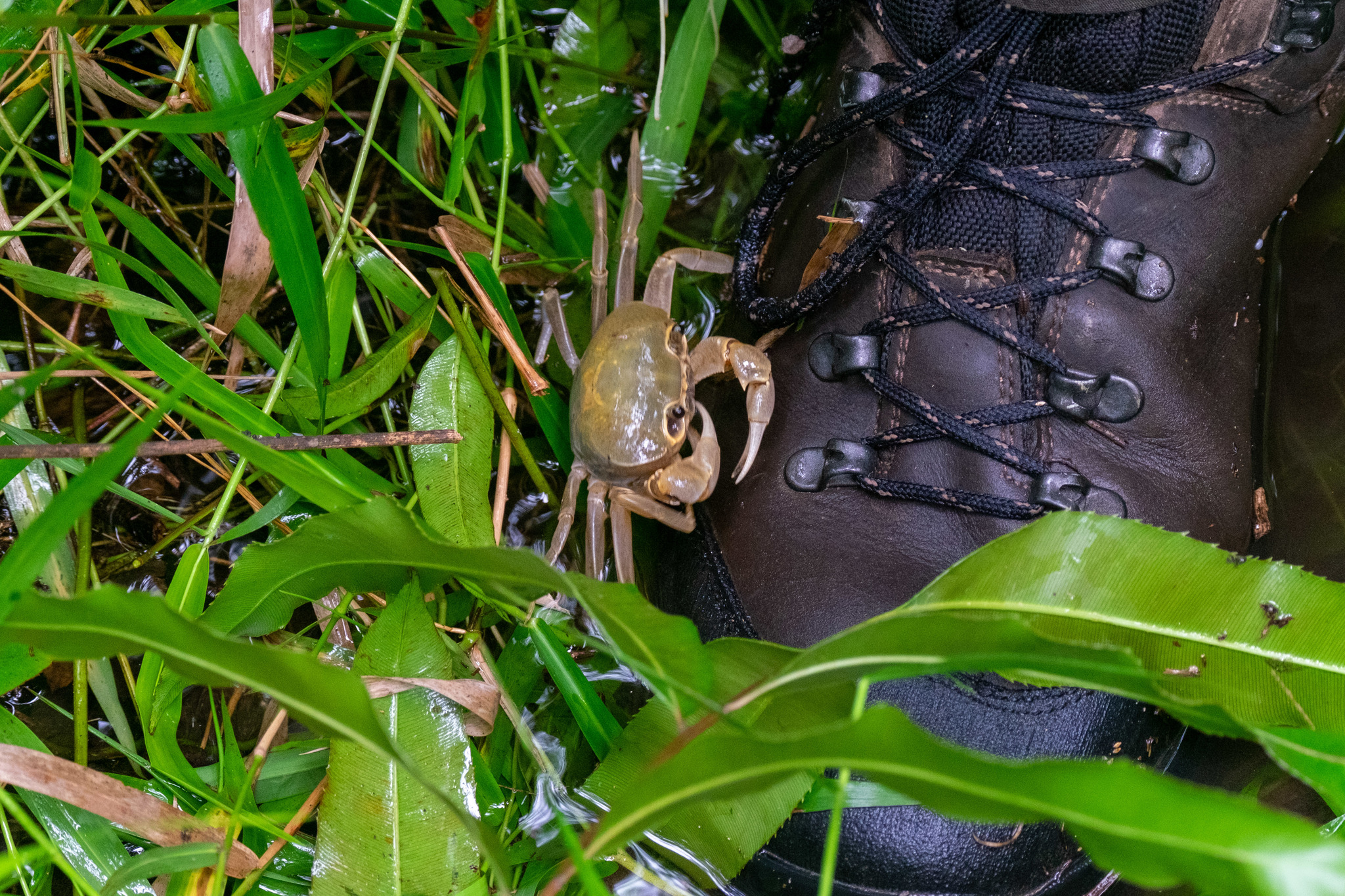

Scientific classification
- Kingdom: Animalia
- Phylum: Arthropoda
- Class: Malacostraca
- Order: Decapoda
- Suborder: Pleocyemata
- Infraorder: Brachyura
- Family: Potamidae
- Subfamily: Potamiscinae
- Genus: Laevimon; Yeo & Ng (2005)

= Laevimon =

Genus of crabs

External image
- Images at iNaturalist

Laevimon is a genus of freshwater crabs, found in Vietnam. Data are deficient concerning their IUCN Red List of Threatened Species status.

== Species ==
- Laevimon kottelati Yeo & Ng, 2005
- Laevimon tankiense (Dang & Tran, 1992)
