= Balssipotamon =

Scientific classification
- Domain: Eukaryota
- Kingdom: Animalia
- Phylum: Arthropoda
- Class: Malacostraca
- Order: Decapoda
- Suborder: Pleocyemata
- Infraorder: Brachyura
- Family: Potamidae
- Subfamily: Potamiscinae
- Genus: Balssipotamon; Đăng & Hồ, 2008

Type species
- Potamon (Potamonautes) fruhstorferi Balss, 1914

Genus of crabs

Balssipotamon is a genus of freshwater crabs, found in Vietnam. Data are deficient concerning their IUCN Red List of Threatened Species status, but B. fruehstorferi is considered to be vulnerable.

== Species ==
- Balssipotamon fruehstorferi (Balss, 1914)
- Balssipotamon tre Marin, 2023
- Balssipotamon ungulatum (Đăng & Hồ, 2003)
