= Dalatomon =

Scientific classification
- Kingdom: Animalia
- Phylum: Arthropoda
- Class: Malacostraca
- Order: Decapoda
- Suborder: Pleocyemata
- Infraorder: Brachyura
- Family: Potamidae
- Subfamily: Potamiscinae
- Genus: Dalatomon; Đăng & Hồ, 2007

Type species
- Dalatomon soni Đăng & Hồ, 2007

Genus of crabs

Dalatomon is a genus of freshwater crabs, named after the Dalat area, where it is found in Vietnam. Data are deficient concerning their IUCN Red List of Threatened Species status.

== Species ==
- Dalatomon laevior (Kemp, 1923)
- Dalatomon loxophrys (Kemp, 1923)
