= Villopotamon =

Scientific classification
- Domain: Eukaryota
- Kingdom: Animalia
- Phylum: Arthropoda
- Class: Malacostraca
- Order: Decapoda
- Suborder: Pleocyemata
- Infraorder: Brachyura
- Family: Potamidae
- Subfamily: Potamiscinae
- Genus: Villopotamon; Dang & Hô (2003)

Genus of crabs

Villopotamon is a genus of freshwater crabs, recorded from Thailand and Vietnam. Data are deficient concerning their IUCN Red List of Threatened Species status.

== Species ==
- Villopotamon klossianum (Kemp, 1923)
- Villopotamon sphaeridium (Kemp, 1923)
- Villopotamon thaii Đăng & Hồ, 2003
