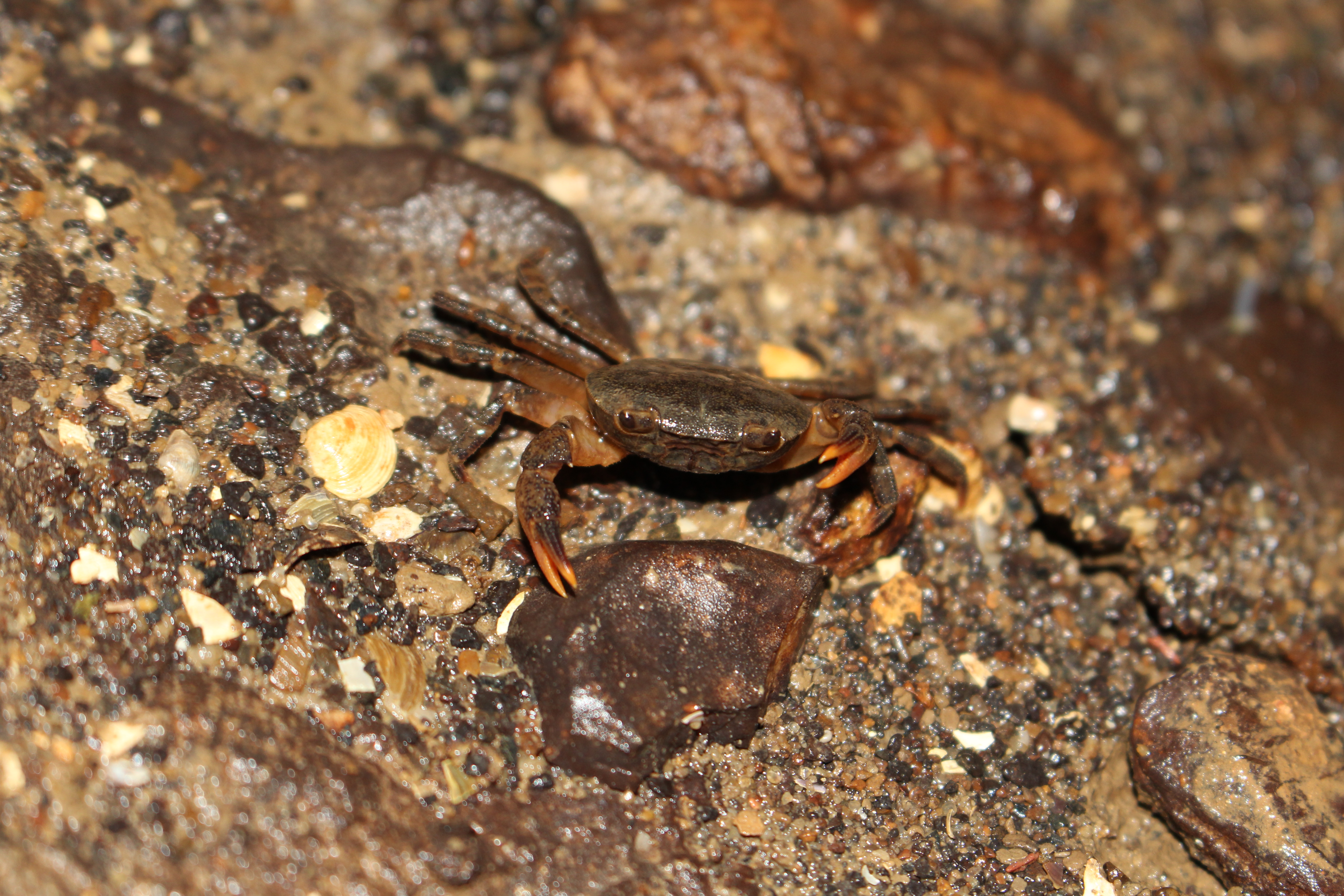

Conservation status
- Least Concern (IUCN 3.1)

Scientific classification
- Kingdom: Animalia
- Phylum: Arthropoda
- Class: Malacostraca
- Order: Decapoda
- Suborder: Pleocyemata
- Infraorder: Brachyura
- Family: Potamidae
- Genus: Daipotamon
- Species: D. minos

Binomial name
- Daipotamon minos Ng & Trontelj, 1996

= Daipotamon =

Daipotamon minos

Species of crab

Daipotamon minos is a cavernicolous freshwater crab species found in a single limestone cave near La Tai village in Libo county, Guizhou province at an altitude of about 600 m above sea level, where it inhabits slowly flowing or stagnant parts of a subterranean river. It is the only species of the genus Daipotamon.
