= Vietorientalia =

Scientific classification
- Domain: Eukaryota
- Kingdom: Animalia
- Phylum: Arthropoda
- Class: Malacostraca
- Order: Decapoda
- Suborder: Pleocyemata
- Infraorder: Brachyura
- Family: Potamidae
- Subfamily: Potamiscinae
- Genus: Vietorientalia; Đăng & Trần, 1992

Species
- Vietorientalia glabra; Vietorientalia rubra

Genus of crabs

Vietorientalia is a genus of freshwater crabs native to Vietnam. There are two described extant species.

== Extant species ==
- Vietorientalia glabra (Đăng, 1967)
- Vietorientalia rubra (Đăng & Trần, 1992)
