= Diyutamon =

Scientific classification
- Kingdom: Animalia
- Phylum: Arthropoda
- Clade: Pancrustacea
- Class: Malacostraca
- Order: Decapoda
- Suborder: Pleocyemata
- Infraorder: Brachyura
- Family: Potamidae
- Genus: Diyutamon; Huang, Shih & Ng, 2017
- Species: D. cereum

Binomial name
- Diyutamon cereum Huang, Shih & Ng, 2017

Genus of crabs

Diyutamon cereum is a species of potamoid freshwater crab discovered in 2017 from a cave in Guizhou, China. It is the only species of the genus Diyutamon.

It is a troglobiont, with a pale body coloration and strongly reduced eyes.
