= Himalayapotamon =

Scientific classification
- Kingdom: Animalia
- Phylum: Arthropoda
- Clade: Pancrustacea
- Class: Malacostraca
- Order: Decapoda
- Suborder: Pleocyemata
- Infraorder: Brachyura
- Family: Potamidae
- Subfamily: Potaminae
- Genus: Himalayapotamon; Pretzmann, 1966

Type species
- Telphusa atkinsoniana Wood-Mason, 1871

Synonyms
- Potamon (Himalayapotamon) Pretzmann, 1966

Genus of freshwater crabs

Himalayapotamon is a genus of freshwater crabs. There are 18 species assigned to this genus:

- Himalayapotamon ambivium (Alcock, 1909)
- Himalayapotamon atkinsonianum (Wood-Mason, 1871)
- Himalayapotamon babaulti (Bouvier, 1918)
- Himalayapotamon bifarium (Alcock, 1909)
- Himalayapotamon chambaensis Mitra & Valarmathi, 2017
- Himalayapotamon emphyseteum (Alcock, 1909)
- Himalayapotamon garhwalense Pati & Singh, 2017
- Himalayapotamon jammuense Kour, Langer, Mitra, Sharma, Devi & Narain, 2024
- Himalayapotamon jorethangense Mitra & Khamo, 2024
- Himalayapotamon kasaulis (Pretzmann, 1966)
- Himalayapotamon koolooense (Rathbun, 1904)
- Himalayapotamon kumaunense Mitra & Khamo, 2024
- Himalayapotamon marinellii (Pretzmann, 1963)
- Himalayapotamon monticola (Alcock, 1910)
- Himalayapotamon pretzmanni Mitra, 2019
- Himalayapotamon robertsianum Klaus & Brandis, 2019
- Himalayapotamon sunkoshiense Brandis & S Sharma, 2005
- Himalayapotamon valmiki Mitra & Khamo, 2024
