= Hainanpotamon =

Scientific classification
- Domain: Eukaryota
- Kingdom: Animalia
- Phylum: Arthropoda
- Class: Malacostraca
- Order: Decapoda
- Suborder: Pleocyemata
- Infraorder: Brachyura
- Family: Potamidae
- Subfamily: Potamiscinae
- Genus: Hainanpotamon; Dai, 1995

Type species
- Potamon (Potamon) orientale Parisi, 1916

Synonyms
- Orientalia Dang, 1975, non Radoman, 1972

Genus of crabs

Hainanpotamon is a genus of freshwater crabs, containing the following species:

- Hainanpotamon auriculatum Yeo & Naruse, 2008
- Hainanpotamon daiae Yeo & Naruse, 2008
- Hainanpotamon directum Yeo & Naruse, 2008
- Hainanpotamon fuchengense Dai, 1995
- Hainanpotamon helense Dai, 1995
- Hainanpotamon orientale (Parisi, 1916)

The genus was originally described in 1975 by Dang as Orientalia but that name was a junior homonym of the mollusc genus Orientalia, established by Radoman in 1972. The first available name is therefore Hainanpotamon, independently established by Dai in 1995.
