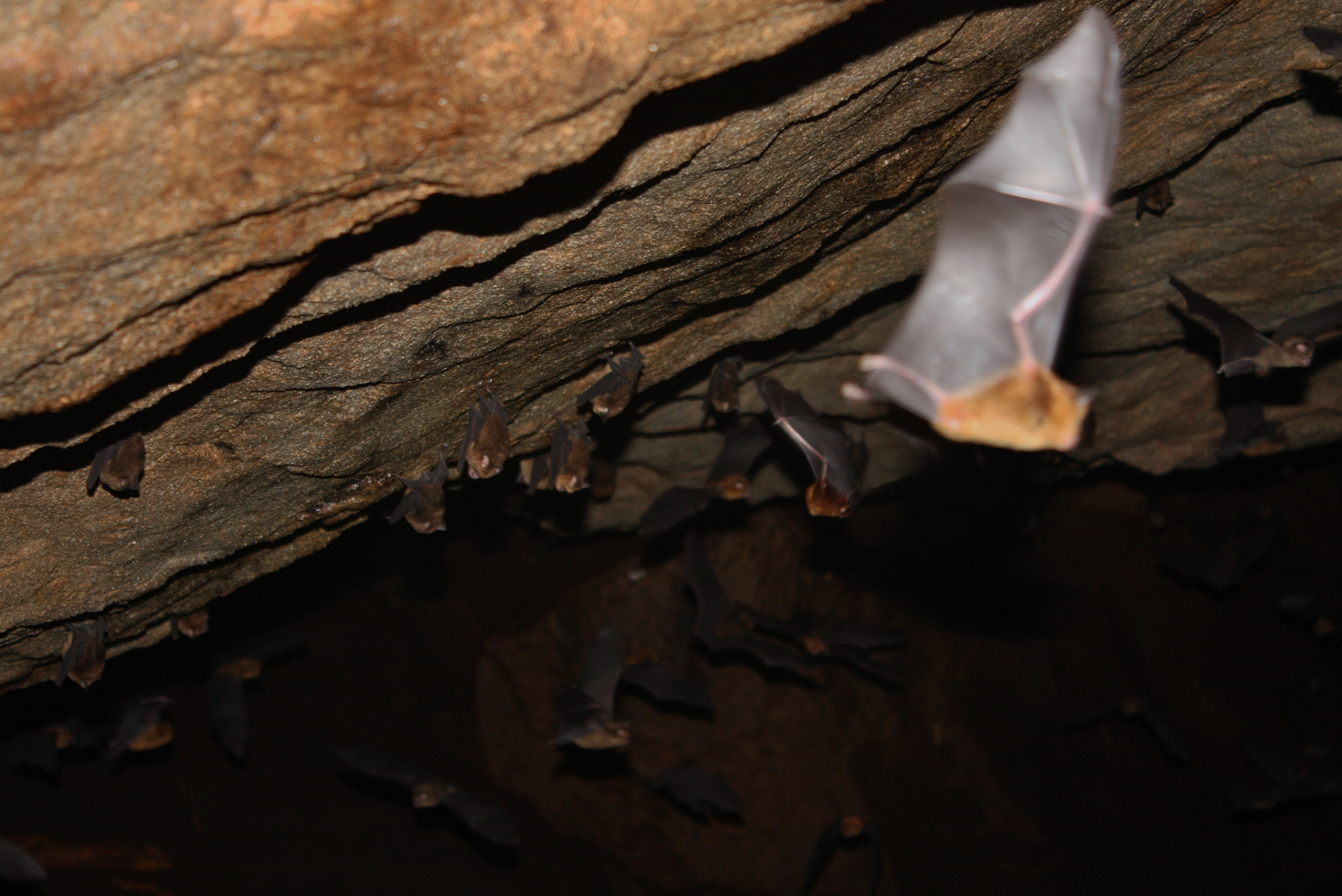

Conservation status
- Least Concern (IUCN 3.1)

Scientific classification
- Kingdom: Animalia
- Phylum: Chordata
- Class: Mammalia
- Order: Chiroptera
- Family: Rhinolophidae
- Genus: Rhinolophus
- Species: R. borneensis

Binomial name
- Rhinolophus borneensis Peters, 1861
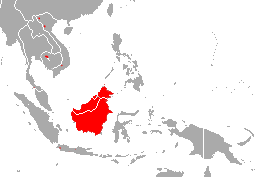
- Bornean horseshoe bat range

= Bornean horseshoe bat =

Species of bat

The Bornean horseshoe bat (Rhinolophus borneensis) is a species of bat in the family Rhinolophidae. It is found in Brunei, Cambodia, Indonesia, Laos, Malaysia, and Vietnam.

== Taxonomy ==
The Bornean horseshoe bat was described as a new species in 1861 by German naturalist Wilhelm Peters. Peters recognized the type locality of the species as Labuan, Borneo. The specimen used to describe the species had been collected on an expedition by Fedor Jagor. Mammal Species of the World 3rd edition recognized four subspecies of R. borneensis:

- R. borneensis borneensis Peters, 1861 - Borneo
- R. borneensis chaseni Sanborn, 1939 - mainland SE Asia
- R. borneensis importunus Chasen, 1939 - Java
- R. borneensis spadix Miller, 1901 - Karimata Islands

== Description ==
It has a forearm length of 41.2–43.7 mm (1.62–1.72 in). Its ears have a length of 16–17 mm (0.63–0.67 in).
