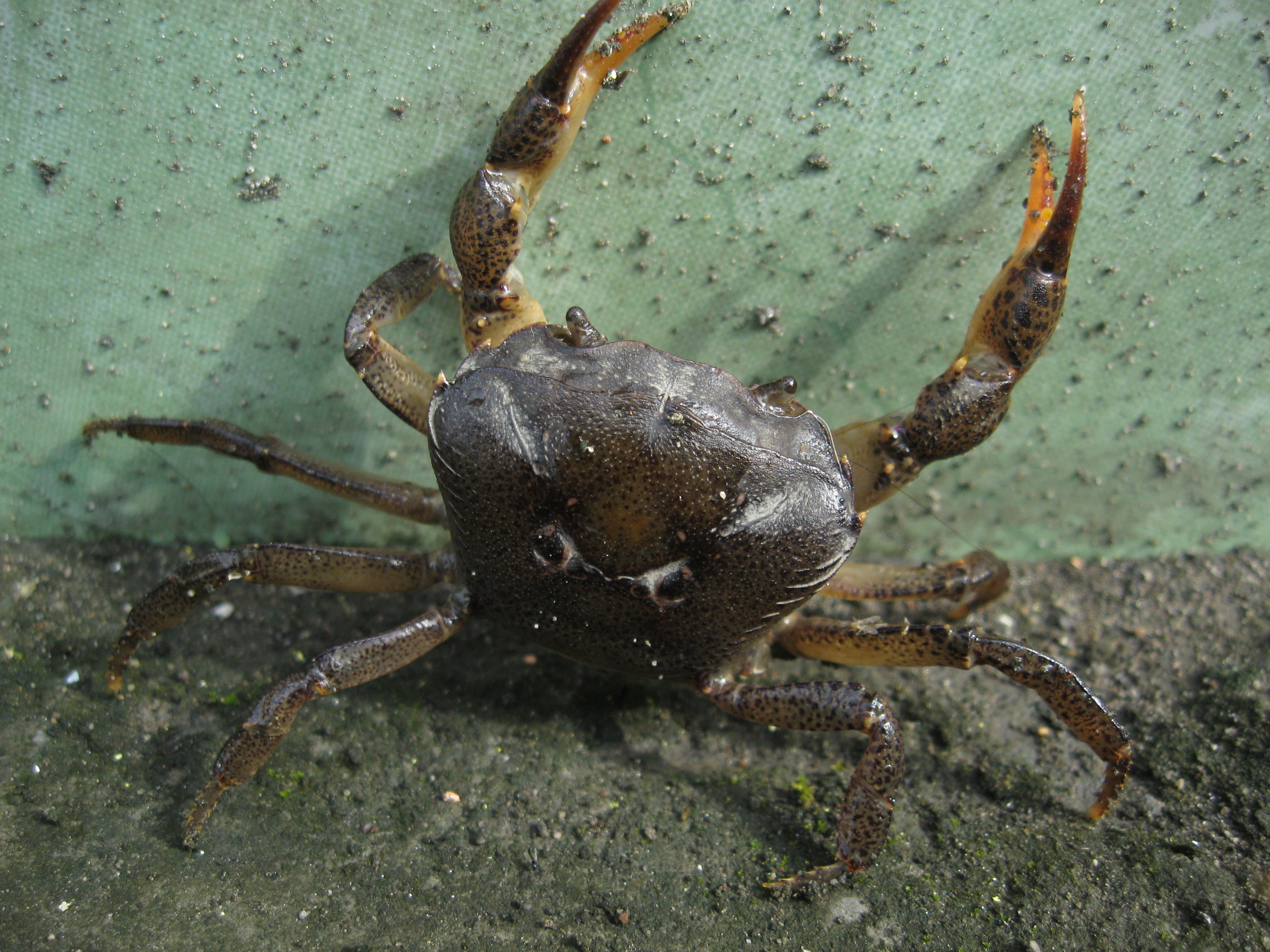

Conservation status
- Data Deficient (IUCN 3.1)

Scientific classification
- Kingdom: Animalia
- Phylum: Arthropoda
- Class: Malacostraca
- Order: Decapoda
- Suborder: Pleocyemata
- Infraorder: Brachyura
- Family: Gecarcinucidae
- Genus: Parathelphusa
- Species: P. convexa

Binomial name
- Parathelphusa convexa (De Man, 1879)

Synonyms
- Cancer (Thelphusa) convexus Herklots, 1861; Paratelphusa convexa De Man, 1879; Parathelphusa dentipes Heller, 1862

= Parathelphusa convexa =

Species of gecarcinucid crab

The yuyu (Parathelphusa convexa) is a species of gecarcinucid crab. It is native to Java, and lives on rice paddies and rivers. They are often preyed upon by storks, ducks, large fish, toads and asian water monitors.

== Description ==
They have a dark brown trapezium-shaped carapace with three teeth and small eyes, with the third maxilliped closed shut.

== Uses ==
The corpses of this crab is used as a pest control as its smell attracts Leptocorisa oratoria, which eats rice ears.
