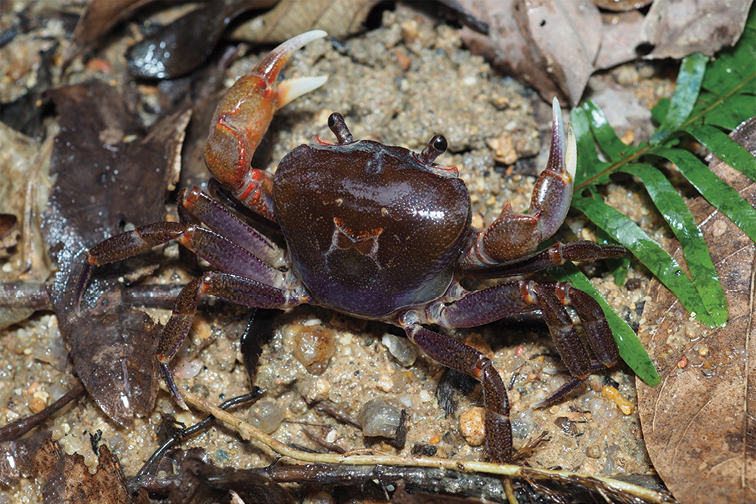
- Nanhaipotamon macau

Scientific classification
- Domain: Eukaryota
- Kingdom: Animalia
- Phylum: Arthropoda
- Class: Malacostraca
- Order: Decapoda
- Suborder: Pleocyemata
- Infraorder: Brachyura
- Family: Potamidae
- Subfamily: Potamiscinae
- Genus: Nanhaipotamon; Bott, 1968

Type species
- Nanhaipotamon formosanum (Parisi, 1916)

= Nanhaipotamon =

Genus of crabs

Nanhaipotamon is a genus of freshwater crabs, in the subfamily Potamiscinae, found in southern China and Taiwan. As of 2018, 18 species have been described. The genus is named after the South China Sea (Chinese: 南海; pinyin: Nánhǎi; literally: 'South Sea'), for it occurs mostly in coastal areas. The genus was first described by R. Bott in 1968 as Isolapotamon (Nanhaipotamon), i.e., a subgenus of Isolapotamon.

== Description ==
These crabs are relatively large, with a carapace breadth of up to 50 mm (2.0 in). Depending on the species, the carapace may be vividly coloured, especially in males of N. hongkongense (orange to red), N. aculatum (dark blue) and N. zhuhaiense (light blue). Chelipeds are usually unequal, more so in larger males, where one cheliped is relatively much larger than the other. This may be of use in territorial fights, as the crabs are very aggressive towards conspecifics.

== Distribution and habitat ==
Crabs of the genus Nanhaipotamon inhabit the banks of small to medium-sized hill streams, paddy fields and swamps. Although not particularly a lowland species, they usually do not occur above approximately 500 meters above sea level. Most species are nocturnal, leaving their burrows at night to forage. Species belonging to this genus have been recorded from Hong Kong, Macau, Guangdong, Fujian, Zhejiang, Taiwan and Dongyin Island.

== Conservation ==
Although crabs of the genus Nanhaipotamon are subject to the pet trade, not much is known about the population status of most species, and many are only known from their respective type locality. Of the 18 currently accepted species, only three have meaningful IUCN assessments, the rest all being data deficient. Nearly a third of known species were described in the last ten years, and yet there is evidence that a lot more may be discovered in the near future. The gambling hub of Macau is one of the most densely populated places in the world, and a new species has been described there as recently as 2018. The rapid urbanization of coastal regions, habitat destruction, impacts on water quality and collection for consumption and the pet trade, pose serious threats to most known species.

== Health ==
Nanhaipotamon fujianense is known to be an intermediate host for the lung fluke species Paragonimus skrjabini.

== Species ==
- Nanhaipotamon aculatum Dai, 1997
- Nanhaipotamon dongyinense Shih, Chen & Wang, 2005
- Nanhaipotamon formosanum (Parisi, 1916)
- Nanhaipotamon fujianense Lin, Cheng & Chen, 2013
- Nanhaipotamon guangdongense Dai, 1997
- Nanhaipotamon hepingense Dai, 1997
- Nanhaipotamon hongkongense (Shen, 1940)
- Nanhaipotamon huaanense Dai, 1997
- Nanhaipotamon macau Huang, Wong & Ahyong, 2018
- Nanhaipotamon nanriense Dai, 1997
- Nanhaipotamon pinghense Dai, 1997
- Nanhaipotamon pingtanense Lin, Cheng & Chen, 2012
- Nanhaipotamon pingyuanense Dai, 1997
- Nanhaipotamon wenzhouense Dai, 1997
- Nanhaipotamon wupingense Cheng, Yang, Zhong & Li, 2003
- Nanhaipotamon xiapuense Cheng, Li & Zhang, 2009
- Nanhaipotamon yongchuense Dai, 1997
- Nanhaipotamon zhuhaiense Huang, Huang & Ng, 2012

== Gallery ==
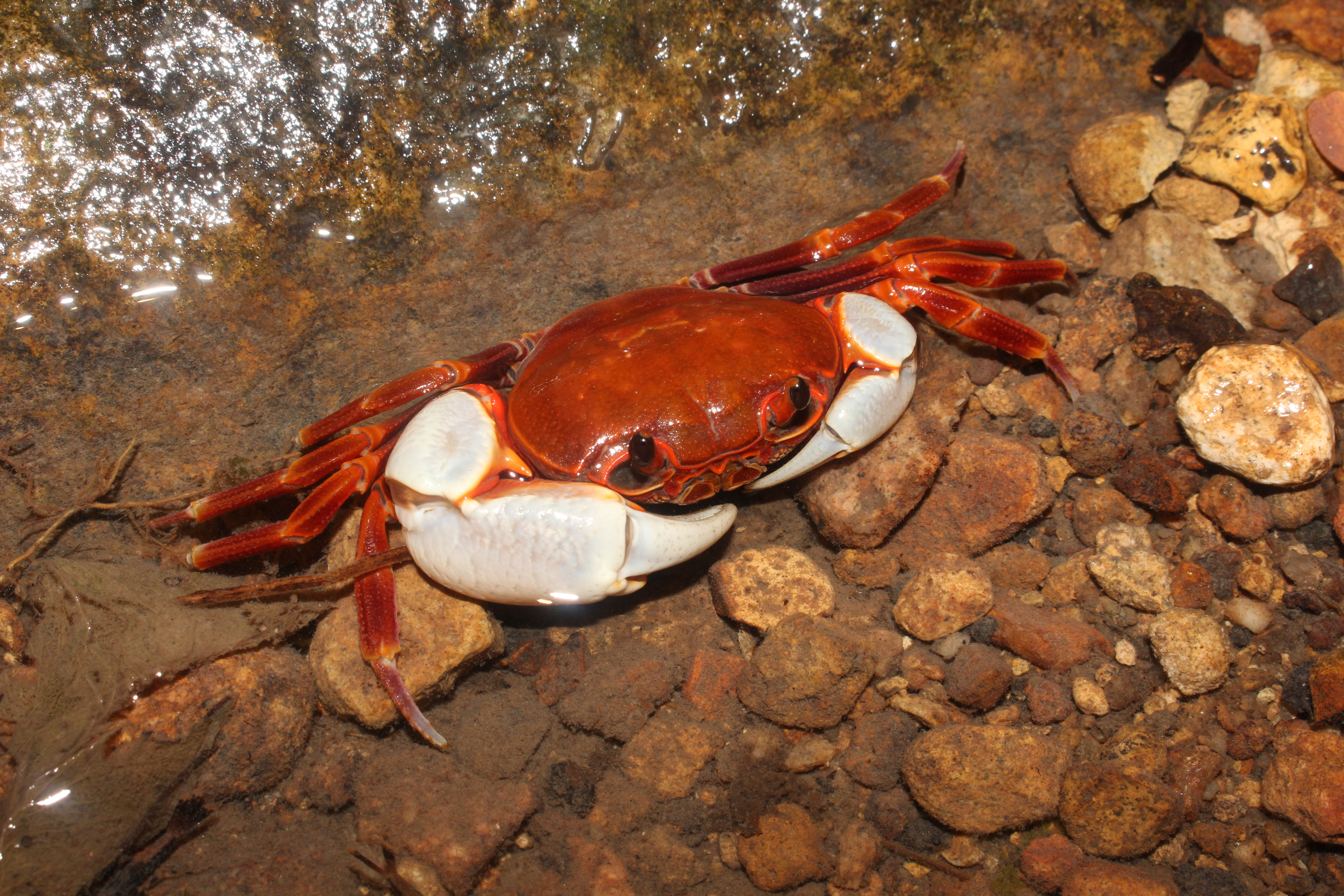
Nanhaipotamon hongkongense

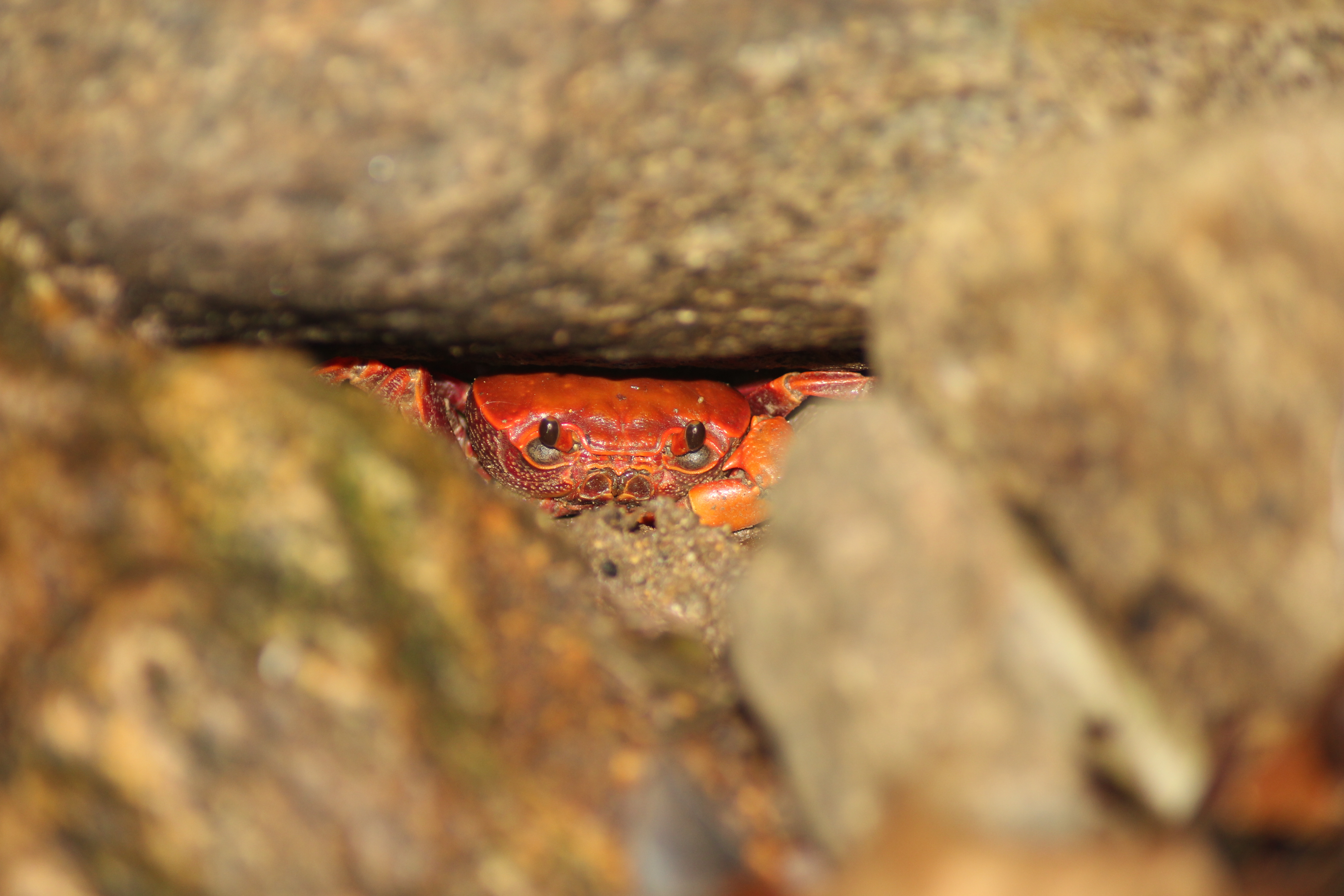
Nanhaipotamon hongkongense

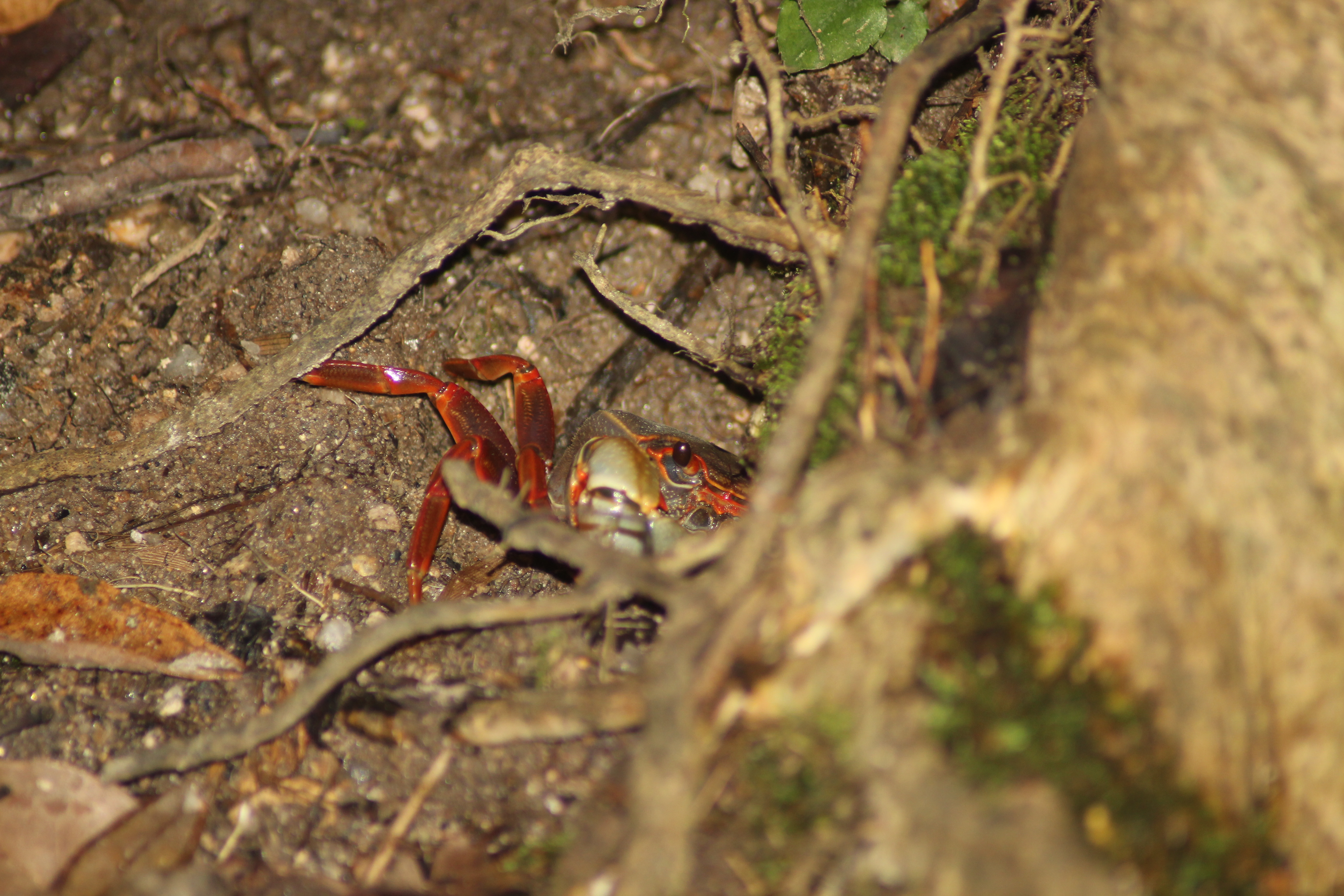
Nanhaipotamon aculatum

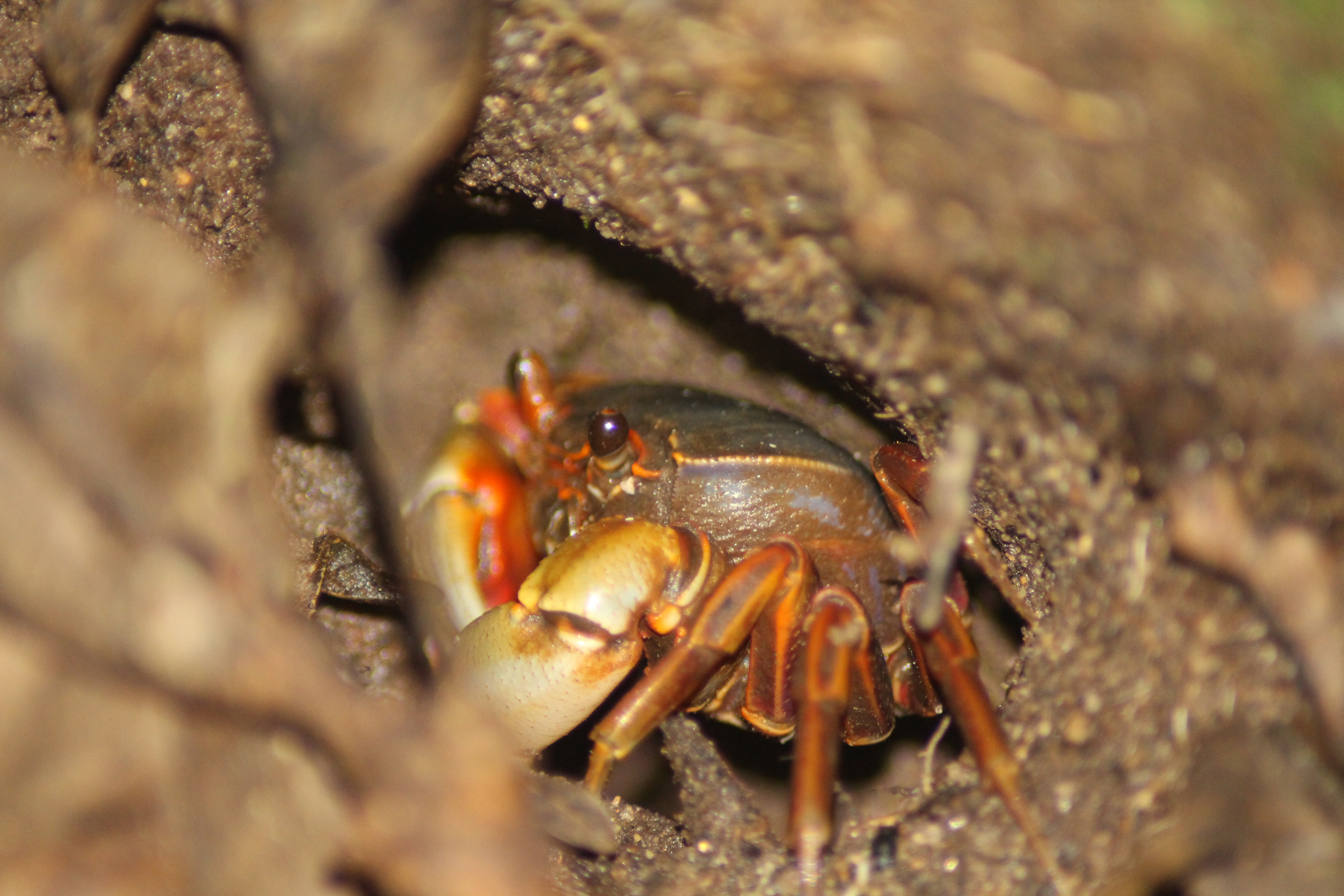
Nanhaipotamon aculatum

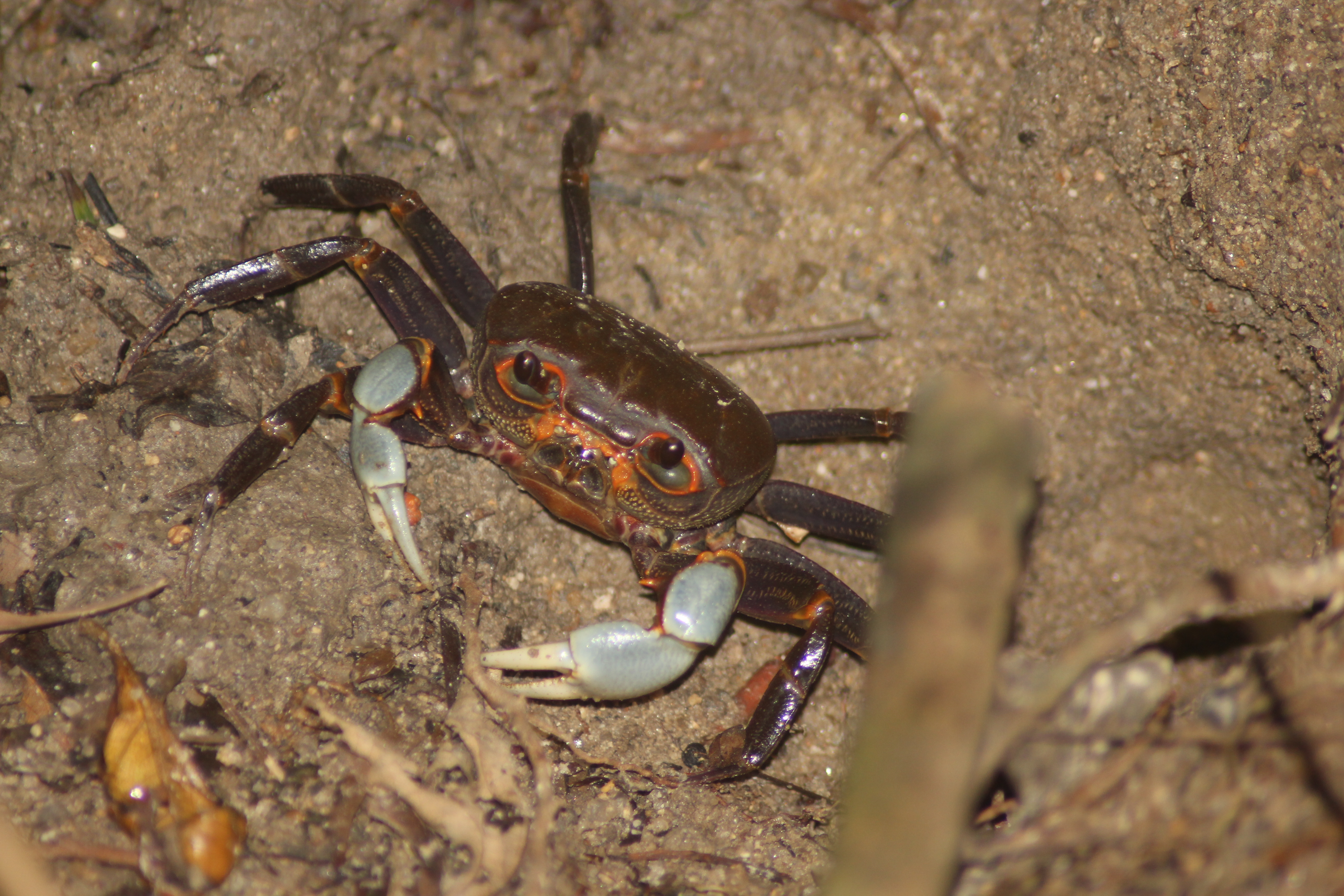
Nanhaipotamon guangdongense
