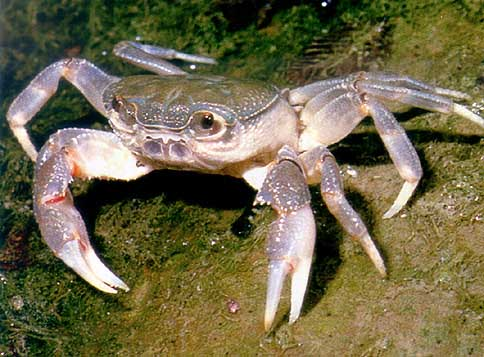
- Potamon fluviatile

Scientific classification
- Kingdom: Animalia
- Phylum: Arthropoda
- Clade: Pancrustacea
- Class: Malacostraca
- Order: Decapoda
- Suborder: Pleocyemata
- Infraorder: Brachyura
- Superfamily: Potamoidea
- Family: Potamidae; Ortmann, 1896

Subfamilies
- Potaminae; Potamiscinae

= Potamidae =

Potamidae Temporal range: Paleocene-recent

Family of crabs

Potamidae is a family of freshwater crabs. It includes more than 650 species and nearly 100 genera, which are placed into two subfamilies: Potaminae and Potamiscinae.

== Subfamily Potaminae ==
The Potaminae Ortmann, 1896 are distributed around the Mediterranean Sea, on Socotra and eastwards to Northern India.

- Acanthopotamon Kemp, 1918
- Alcomon Yeo & Ng, 2007
- Himalayapotamon Pretzmann, 1966
- Lobothelphusa Bouvier, 1917
- Paratelphusula Alcock, 1909
- Potamon Savigny, 1816
- Socotra Cumberlidge & Wranik, 2002
- Socotrapotamon Apel & Brandis, 2000

== Subfamily Potamiscinae ==
The Potamiscinae Bott, 1970 are found in East Asia and Southeast Asia.

- Acartiapotamon Dai, 1999
- Allopotamon Ng, 1988
- Amamiku Naruse, Segawa & Shokita, 2004
- Aparapotamon Dai & G. X. Chen, 1985
- Apotamonautes Dai & Xing, 1993
- Artopotamon Dai & G. X. Chen, 1985
- Arquatopotamon Chu, Zhou & Sun, 2017
- Aspermon Yeo & Ng, 2007
- Badistemon Yeo & Ng, 2007
- Balssipotamon Dang & Ho, 2008
- Beccumon Yeo & Ng, 2007
- Bottapotamon Türkay & Dai, 1997
- Candidiopotamon Bott, 1967
- Carpomon S. H. Tan & Ng, 1998
- Cerberusa Holthuis, 1979
- Chinapotamon Dai & Naiyanetr, 1994
- Cryptopotamon Ng & Dudgeon, 1992
- Daipotamon Ng & Trontelj, 1996
- Dalatomon Dang & Ho, 2007
- Demanietta Bott, 1966
- Diyutamon Huang, Shih & Ng, 2017
- Doimon Yeo & Ng, 2007
- Donopotamon Dang & Ho, 2005
- Dromothelphusa Naiyanetr, 1992
- Eosamon Yeo & Ng, 2007
- Erebusa Yeo & Ng, 1999
- Esanpotamon Naiyanetr & Ng, 1997
- Eurusamon Huang, 2018
- Flabellamon Ng, 1996
- Geothelphusa Stimpson, 1858
- Hainanpotamon Dai, 1995
- Heterochelamon Türkay & Dai, 1997
- Huananpotamon Dai & Ng, 1994
- Ibanum Ng, 1995
- Indochinamon Yeo & Ng, 2007
- Inlethelphusa Yeo & Ng, 2007
- Insulamon Ng & Takeda, 1992
- Iomon Yeo & Ng, 2007
- Isolapotamon Bott, 1968
- Johora Bott, 1966
- Kanpotamon Ng & Naiyanetr, 1993
- Kukrimon Yeo & Ng, 2007:
- Lacunipotamon Dai et al., 1975
- Laevimon Yeo & Ng, 2005
- Larnaudia Bott, 1966
- Latopotamon Dai & Türkay, 1997
- Longpotamon Shih, Huang & Ng, 2016
- Lophopotamon Dai, 1999
- Malayopotamon Bott, 1968
- Mediapotamon Türkay & Dai, 1997
- Megacephalomon Yeo & Ng, 2007
- Mindoron Ng & Takeda, 1992
- Minpotamon Dai & Türkay, 1997
- Minutomon Huang & Mao, 2014
- Nakhonsimon Promdam, Nabhitabhata & Ng, 2014
- Nanhaipotamon Bott, 1968
- Neilupotamon Dai & Türkay, 1997
- Nemoron Ng, 1996
- Neolarnaudia Türkay & Naiyanetr, 1986
- Neotiwaripotamon Dai & Naiyanetr, 1994
- Ovitamon Ng & Takeda, 1992
- Parapotamonoides Dai, 1990
- Parapotamon De Man, 1907
- Pararanguna Dai & G. X. Chen, 1985
- Parvuspotamon Dai & Bo, 1994
- Phaibulamon Ng, 1992
- Phasmon Huang, Ahyong & Shih, 2020
- Pilosamon Ng, 1996
- Planumon Yeo & Ng, 2007
- Potamiscus Alcock, 1909
- Pudaengon Ng & Naiyanetr, 1995
- Pupamon Yeo & Ng, 2007
- Qianguimon Huang, 2018
- Qianpotamon Dai, 1995
- Quadramon Yeo & Ng, 2007
- Rathbunamon Ng, 1996
- Ryukyum Ng & Shokita, 1995
- Setosamon Yeo & Ng, 2007
- Shanphusa Yeo & Ng, 2007
- Sinolapotamon Tai & Sung, 1975
- Sinopotamon Bott, 1967
- Stelomon Yeo & Naiyanetr, 2000
- Stoliczia Bott, 1966
- Takpotamon Brandis, 2002
- Tenuilapotamon Dai et al., 1984
- Tenuipotamon Dai, 1990
- Teretamon Yeo & Ng, 2007
- Terrapotamon Ng, 1986
- Thaiphusa Ng & Naiyanetr, 1993
- Thaipotamon Ng & Naiyanetr, 1993
- Tiwaripotamon Bott, 1970
- Tomaculamon Yeo & Ng, 1997
- Trichopotamon Dai & G. X. Chen, 1985
- Vadosapotamon Dai & Türkay, 1997
- Vietopotamon Dang & Ho, 2002
- Vietorientalia Đăng, 2012
- Villopotamon Dang & Ho, 2003
- Yarepotamon Dai & Türkay, 1997
- Yuebeipotamon Huang, Shih & Mao, 2016
- Yuexipotamon Huang & Mao, 2014
