= Freshwater crab =

Common name for a non-marine crab

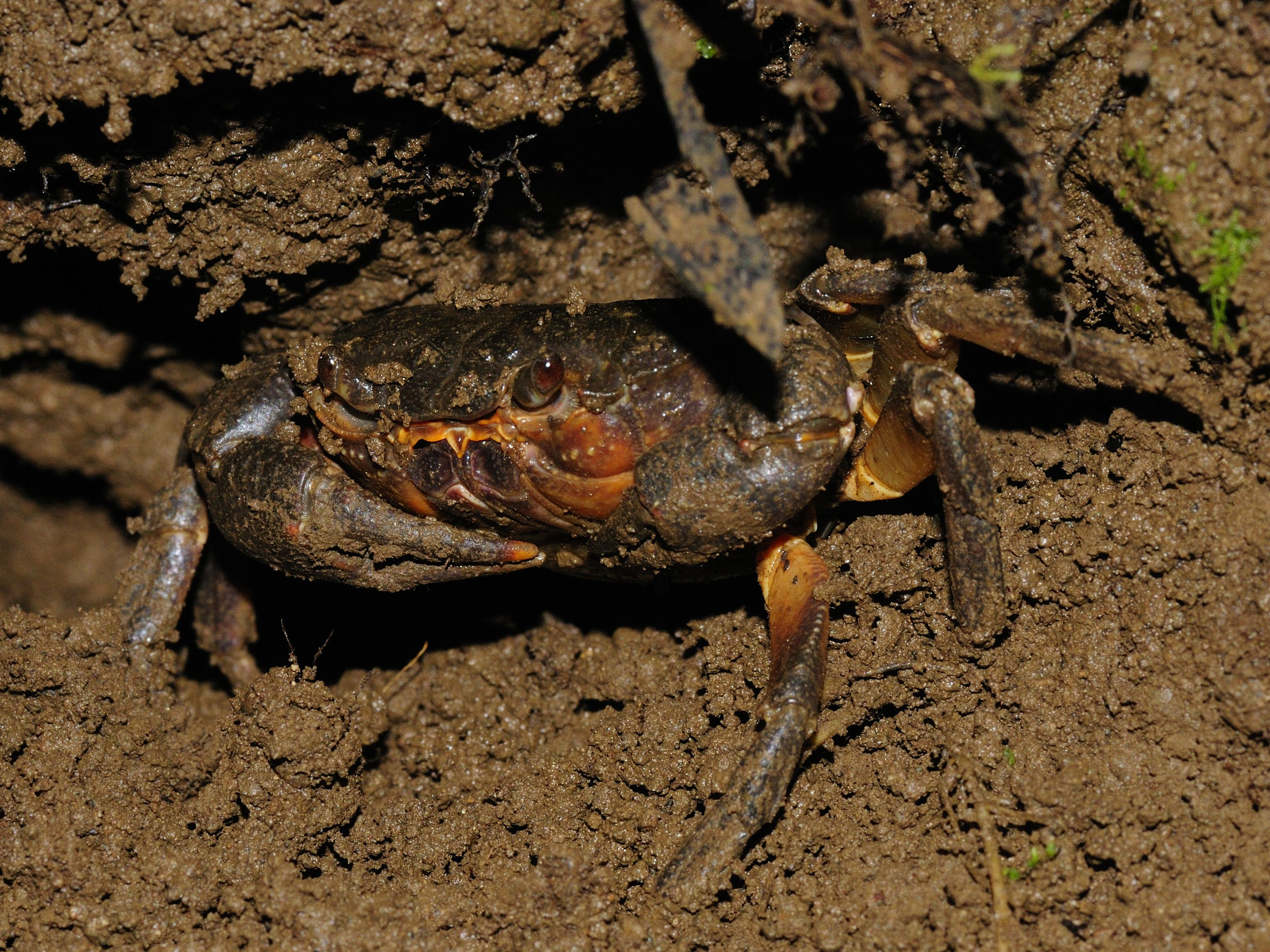
Potamon ibericum (Potamidae) in Georgia

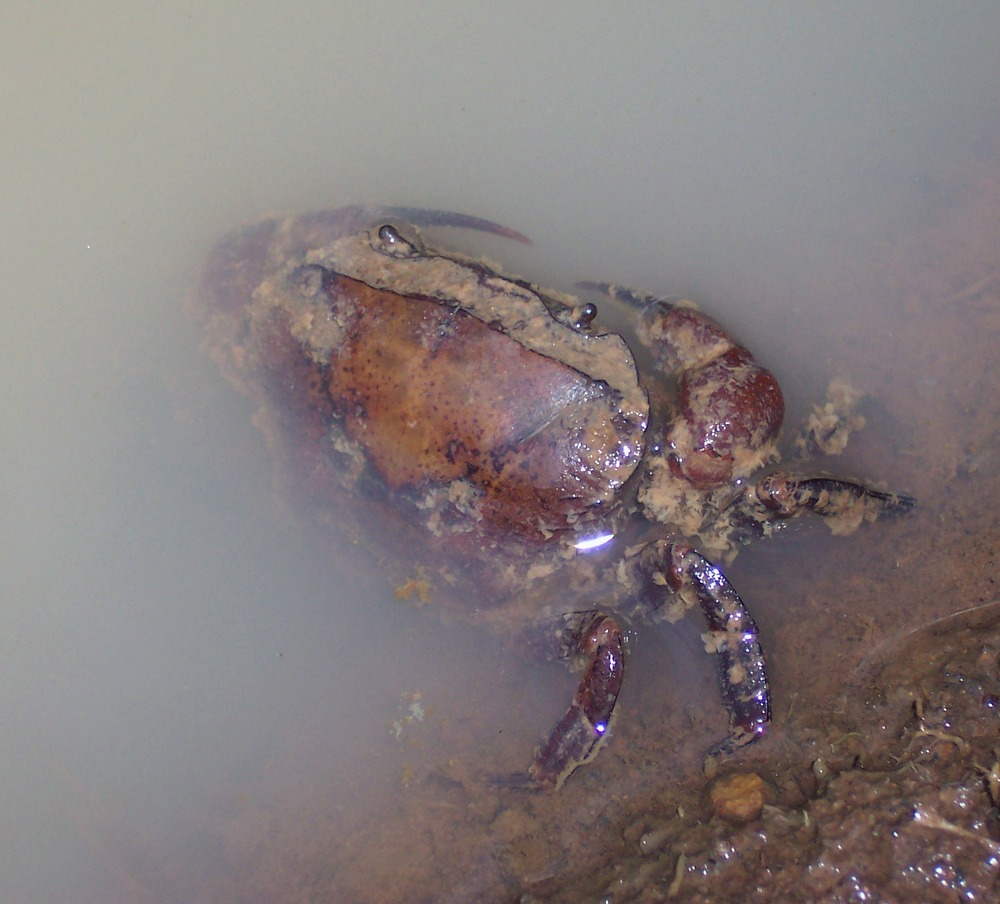
Parathelphusa convexa (Parathelphusidae) in Indonesia

Geothelphusa dehaani in Hakone, Japan

Around 1,300 species of freshwater crabs are distributed throughout the tropics and subtropics, divided among eight families. They show direct development and maternal care of a small number of offspring, in contrast to marine crabs, which release thousands of planktonic larvae. This limits the dispersal abilities of freshwater crabs, so they tend to be endemic to small areas. As a result, a large proportion are threatened with extinction.

== Systematics ==
More than 1,300 described species of freshwater crabs are known, out of a total of 6,700 species of crabs across all environments. The total number of species of freshwater crabs, including undescribed species, is thought to be up to 65% higher, potentially up to 2,155 species, although most of the additional species are currently unknown to science. They belong to eight families, each with a limited distribution, although various crabs from other families are also able to tolerate freshwater conditions (euryhaline) or are secondarily adapted to fresh water. The phylogenetic relationships between these families is still a matter of debate, so how many times the freshwater lifestyle has evolved among the true crabs is unknown. The eight families are:

Superfamily Trichodactyloidea

- Trichodactylidae (Central America and South America)

Superfamily Potamoidea

- Potamidae (Mediterranean Basin and Asia)
- Potamonautidae (Africa, including Madagascar)
- Deckeniidae (East Africa and Seychelles) – also treated as part of Potamonautidae
- Platythelphusidae (East Africa) – also treated as part of Potamonautidae

Superfamily Gecarcinucoidea

- Gecarcinucidae (Asia)
- Parathelphusidae (Asia and Australasia) – nowadays treated as a junior synonym of Gecarcinucidae

Superfamily Pseudothelphusoidea

- Pseudothelphusidae (Central America and South America)

The fossil record of freshwater organisms is typically poor, so few fossils of freshwater crabs have been found. The oldest is Tanzanonautes tuerkayi, from the Oligocene of East Africa, and the evolution of freshwater crabs is likely to postdate the break-up of the supercontinent Gondwana.

Members of the family Aeglidae and Clibanarius fonticola are also restricted to fresh water, but these "crab-like" crustaceans are members of the infraorder Anomura (true crabs are Brachyura).

== Description and lifecycle ==
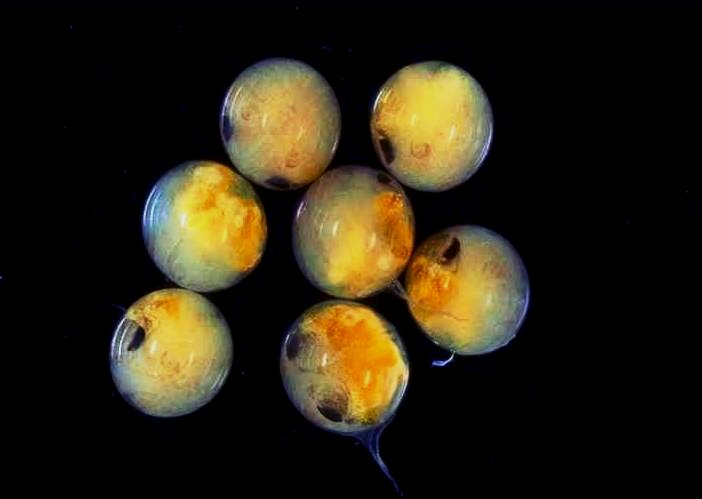
Eggs of Potamon fluviatile containing fully formed juvenile crabs

The external morphology of freshwater crabs varies very little, so the form of the gonopod (first abdominal appendage, modified for insemination) is of critical importance for classification. Development of freshwater crabs is characteristically direct, where the eggs hatch as juveniles, with the larval stages passing within the egg. The broods comprise only a few hundred eggs (compared to hundreds of thousands for marine crabs), each of which is quite large, at a diameter around 1 mm (0.04 in).

The colonisation of fresh water has required crabs to alter their water balance; freshwater crabs can reabsorb salt from their urine, and have various adaptations to reduce the loss of water. In addition to their gills, freshwater crabs have a "pseudolung" in their gill chamber that allows them to breathe in air. These developments have preadapted freshwater crabs for terrestrial living, although freshwater crabs need to return to water periodically to excrete ammonia.

== Ecology and conservation ==
Freshwater crabs are found throughout the tropical and subtropical regions of the world. They live in a wide range of water bodies, from fast-flowing rivers to swamps, as well as in tree boles or caves. They are primarily nocturnal, emerging to feed at night; most are omnivores, although a small number are specialist predators, such as Platythelphusa armata from Lake Tanganyika, which feeds almost entirely on snails. Some species provide important food sources for various vertebrates. A number of freshwater crabs (for example species from the genus Nanhaipotamon) are secondary hosts of flukes in the genus Paragonimus, which causes paragonimiasis in humans.

The majority of species are narrow endemics, occurring in only a small geographical area. This is at least partly attributable to their poor dispersal abilities and low fecundity, and to habitat fragmentation caused by the world's human population. In West Africa, species that live in savannas have wider ranges than species from the rainforest; in East Africa, species from the mountains have restricted distributions, while lowland species are more widespread.

Every species of freshwater crab described so far has been assessed by the International Union for Conservation of Nature; of the species for which data are available, 32% are threatened with extinction. For instance, all but one of Sri Lanka's 50 freshwater crab species are endemic to that country, and more than half are critically endangered.
