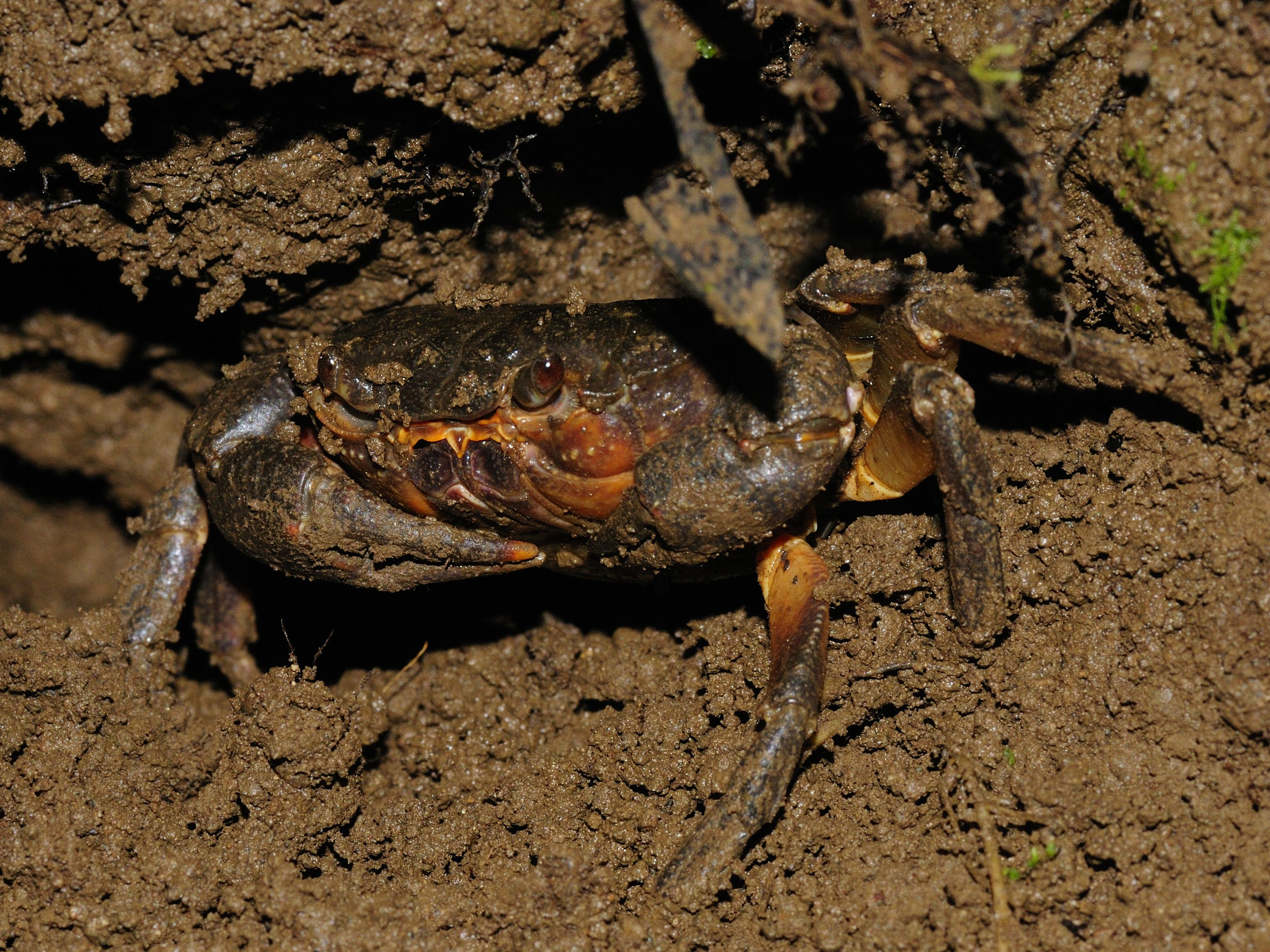

Conservation status
- Near Threatened (IUCN 3.1)

Scientific classification
- Kingdom: Animalia
- Phylum: Arthropoda
- Class: Malacostraca
- Order: Decapoda
- Suborder: Pleocyemata
- Infraorder: Brachyura
- Family: Potamidae
- Genus: Potamon
- Species: P. ibericum

Binomial name
- Potamon ibericum (Bieberstein, 1808)

Synonyms
- Cancer ibericum Bieberstein, 1808

= Potamon ibericum =

Species of crab

The Iberian freshwater crab (Potamon ibericum) is a Eurasian species of freshwater crab. It is an omnivore that feeds on land, but returns regularly to the water, and can survive short periods of drought in burrows and under stones. Its natural range stretches from north-eastern Greece, around both sides of the Black Sea and to beyond the Caspian Sea; populations have also been introduced to southern France. It is included as a near threatened species on the IUCN Red List, and is included in the Red Data Book for Ukraine.

== Description ==
Potamon ibericum differs from other species in the genus in the form of the first pleopod of the males – the organ used to transfer spermatophores. In P. ibericum, the flexible zone of this appendage is widest near the middle, rather than V-shaped (as in P. fluviatile and P. rhodium) or bilobed (as in P. potamios).

== Ecology and behaviour ==
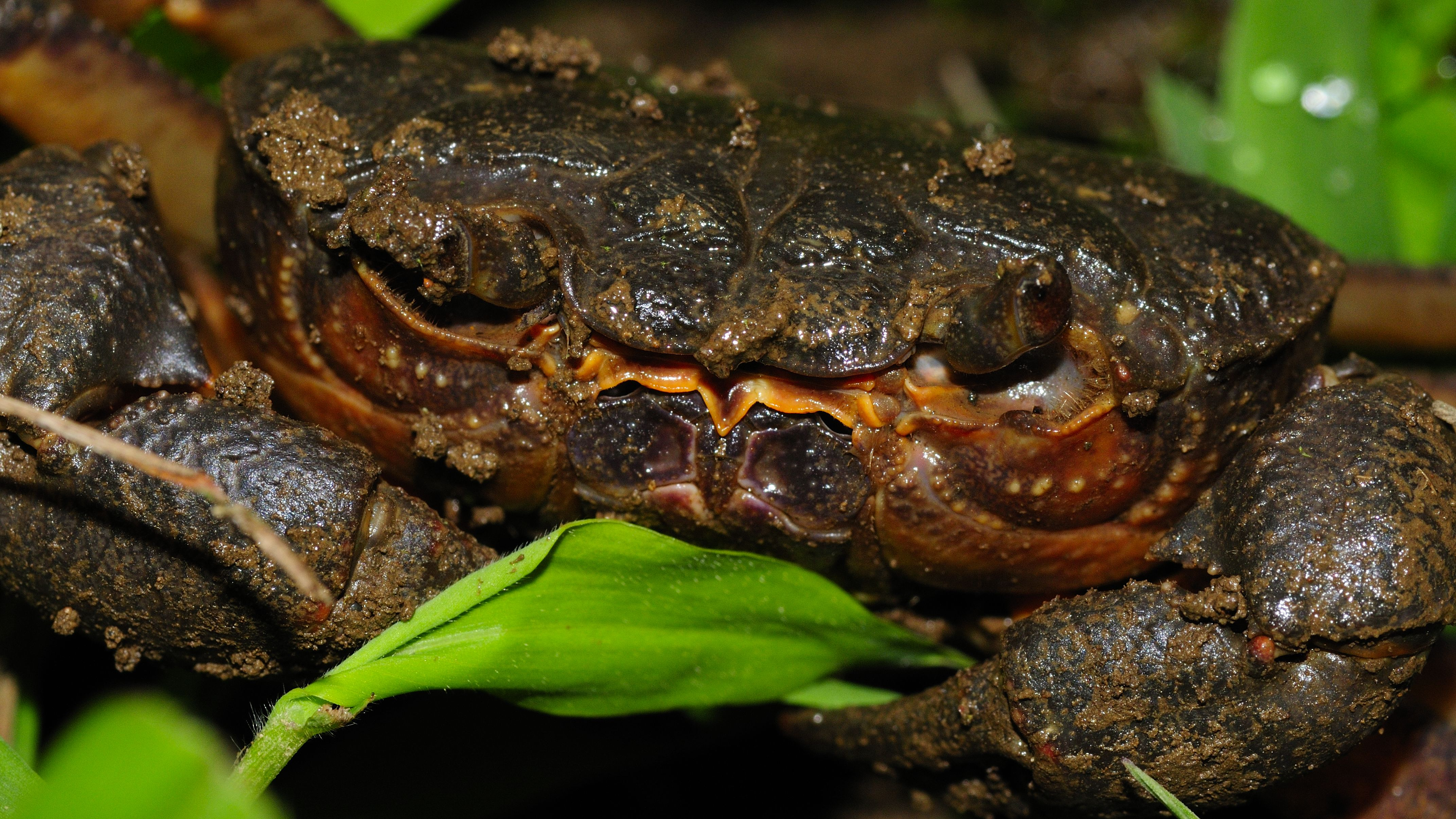
P. ibericum is an omnivore.

The continued survival of P. ibericum generally requires a permanent body of water, although the crabs can survive short periods of drought by retreating under stones, or into deep burrows. These burrows may be several kilometres from the nearest body of water. They only breed in moving water, with copulation occurring in the warmer months, from June to October.

Potamon ibericum is an omnivore, eating detritus, filamentous algae, and plant matter, as well as a variety of animals, including worms, amphipod crustaceans, aquatic insect larvae, molluscs, frogs and tadpoles, fish, and carrion. It feeds on land during the night, and if the air is humid enough, also during the day. In the areas where it occurs, P. ibericum is a major food item for the European otter, Lutra lutra, alongside a variety of fish species.

== Distribution ==
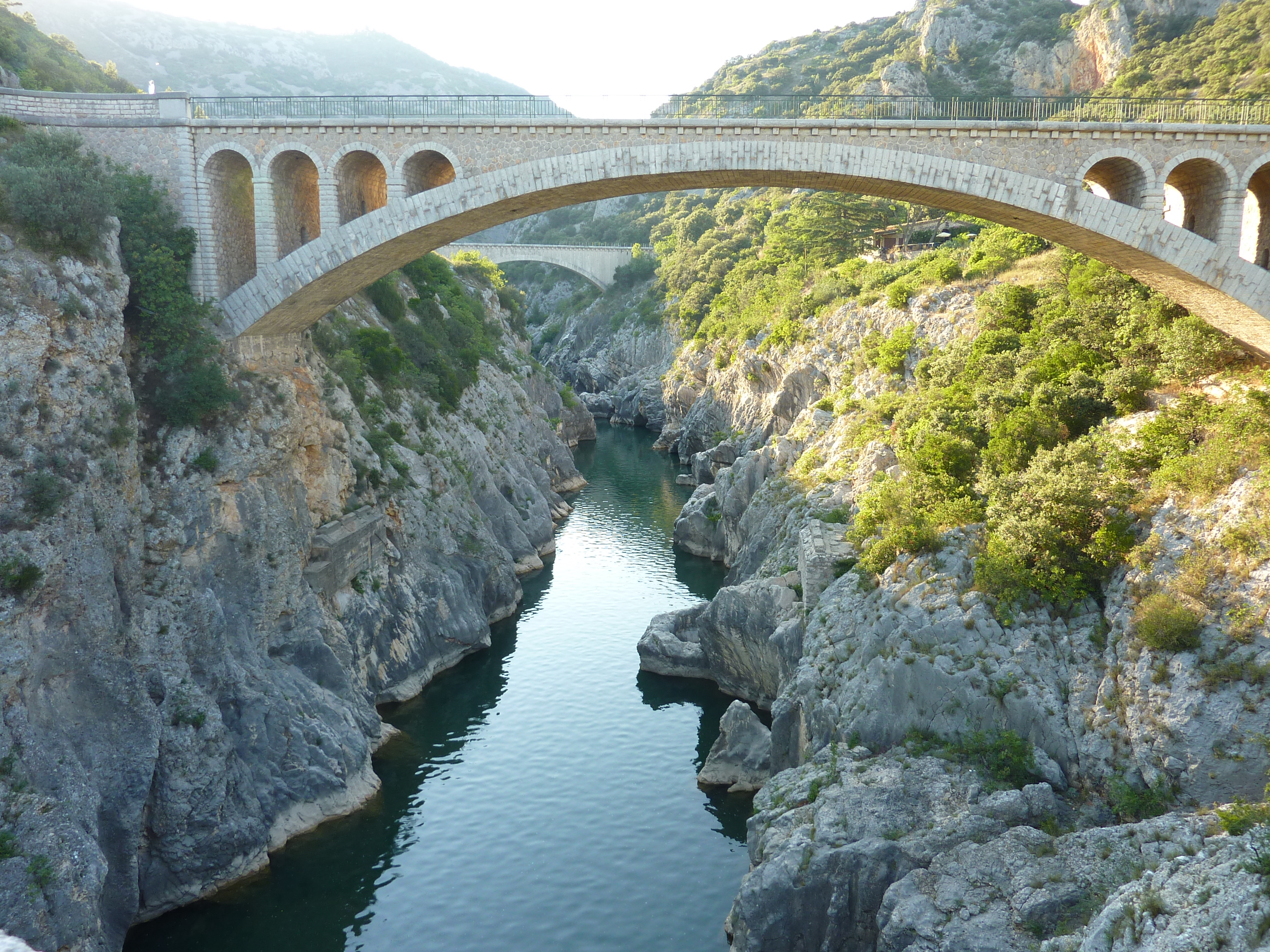
The Hérault River near Saint-Guilhem-le-Désert houses an introduced population of P. ibericum.

The natural range of P. ibericum is wide, but highly fragmented. In Europe, it is present in the Danube and its tributaries in Bulgaria, as well as rivers in North Macedonia, north-eastern Greece (east of the Axios River), Cyprus and the European part of Turkey, and around the coast of the Black Sea through Ukraine to the Caucasus. Despite the specific epithet ibericum, the species does not occur on the Iberian Peninsula, which has no native freshwater crabs, but to Caucasian Iberia. The Asian part of its range extends across Turkey to Iran and Turkmenistan. Some sites that formerly held populations of P. ibericum have been subject to occasional desiccation, and the crab populations have been reduced or extirpated. The northern limit of the species, like that of its western relative, P. fluviatile is close to the 0 °C (32 °F) January isotherm.

Potamon ibericum was introduced to the Cagne River in southern France between 1975 and 1983, when crayfish of the species Astacus leptodactylus were imported for aquaculture from Turkey. It is now found some 6 km (3.7 mi) downstream of that site, at the entrance to a series of gorges, in a part of the river that rarely dries out. A second population was discovered in the 1990s, 300 km (190 mi) from the Cagne site, in the Hérault River near Saint-Guilhem-le-Désert. Neither population is considered invasive. Another species of Potamon – P. fluviatile – has also been introduced to France, in the vicinity of Nice.

Fossil crabs assigned to the species "P. antiquum" have been discovered in sediments of Pliocene–Pleistocene age in northern Hungary. That species was previously thought to represent the ancestor of several extant species, including P. fluviatile and P. ibericum, but its young age and geographical location suggests that "P. antiquum" may represent specimens of P. ibericum from former populations beyond the species' current northern limit. Fossils assigned to P. ibericum from Vallesian sediments at Richardhof in the Vienna Basin suggest that the crabs in those sediments were predators of an extinct snail in the genus Melanopsis.

== Conservation ==
Despite its wide geographical range, P. ibericum is classified as near threatened on the IUCN Red List, as "it is possible that populations of P. ibericum in parts of its range might be in danger of extirpation in the future, especially those on islands or near centres of human population on the mainland". It may even approach a classification of vulnerable. The species is listed in the Red Data Book for Ukraine.
