= Baħrija =

Baħrija Il-Baħrija
- Administrative Committee
- Kumitat Amministrattiv tal-Baħrija
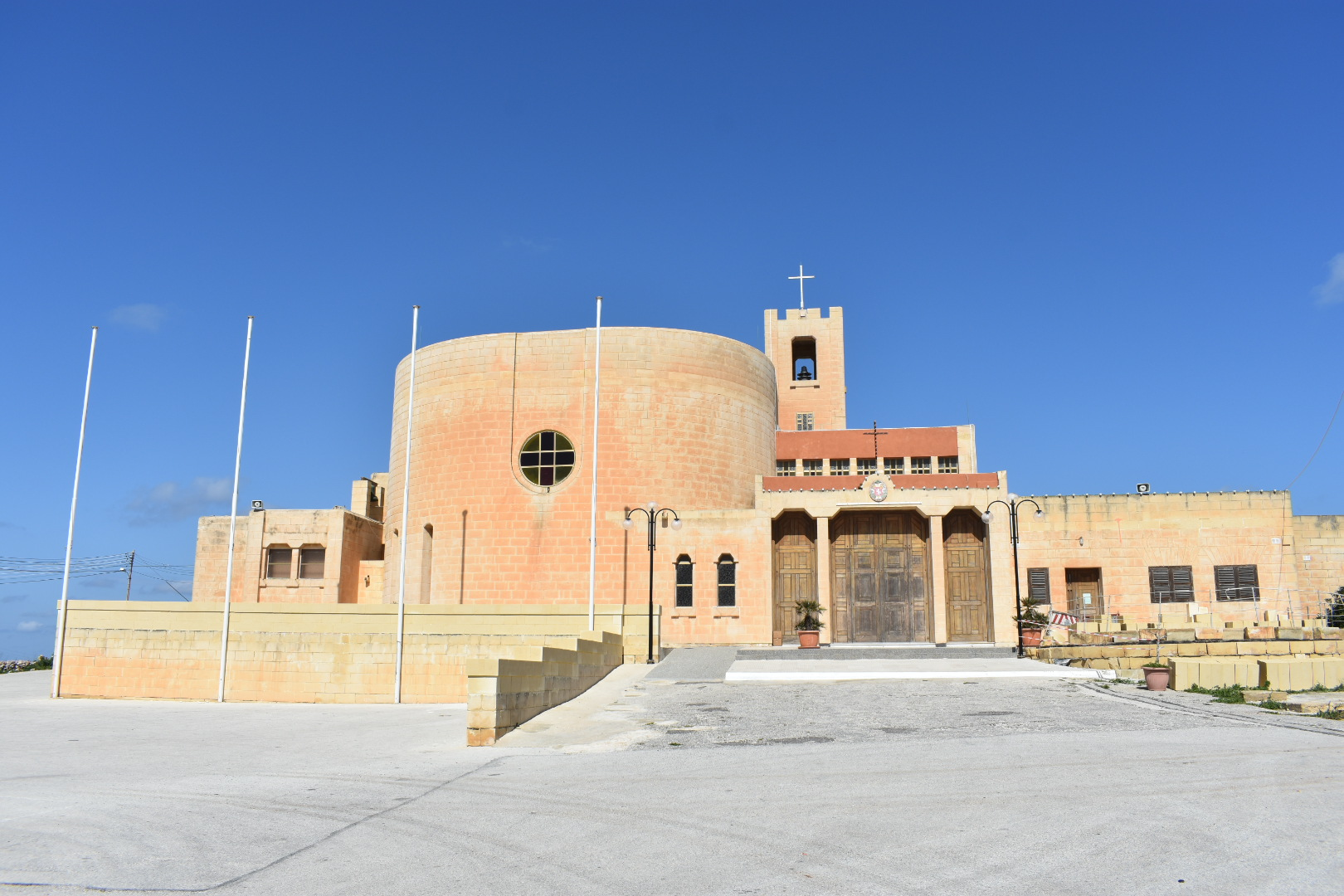
- Baħrija Parish Church of St Martin of Tours

- Location within Malta
- Coordinates: 35°53′41″N 14°20′54″E
- Country: Malta
- Island: Malta Island
- Suburb of: Rabat, Malta
- Demonym: Tal-Baħrija
- Time zone: UTC+1 (CET)
  - Summer (DST): UTC+2 (CEST)
- Postal code: RBT
- Dialing code: 356
- Patron saint: Saint Martin (nearest Sunday to 11 November)
- Day of festa: Sunday near November 11

Baħrija is a village in Rabat, western Malta, with a low population density. The name Baħrija means moth in Maltese. It is also known in English as Baħria, of which the Counts Moscati had owned the fiefdom that was granted by the Grand Master of Malta.

== Overview ==
Two churches are present in Baħrija, an old one (which was re-inaugurated on Saturday 19 October 2013), and the newer church, built in 1984, which is dedicated to Saint Martin of Tours and is currently in use.

The main feast in Baħrija is that of Saint Martin of Tours, which is celebrated annually on 11 November. This feast is associated with an old tradition where a bagful of an assortment of nuts, sweets and fresh fruit is given to young children on the day.

Another tradition present exclusively in Baħrija is the annual fair which is held on the Sunday before the feast, where assortments of goods are given away in a number of lotteries.

Baħrija is also famous for its rabbit-cooking restaurants.

Baħrija is one of the highest places in Malta, therefore the weather here is cooler than at lower elevations (it is also exposed to the cold northern winds coming over the sea). Most of the north of Malta is visible from this village, but the south west of Gozo (including Xlendi) is also visible, and on clear still nights, a line of streetlights is visible on the horizon to the north, where Sicily is.

Although Baħrija has little rich soil, much of its land is used for agriculture, mostly growing grape vines and other common fruit that can withstand the harsh heat of the summer and the lack of soil.

Baħrija is a good place to search for walks. For a cliff climb, there is the Fomm ir-Rih walk, or for Maltese heritage, the Victoria Lines start at Kunċizzjoni.

== Baħrija's zones ==
- Fomm ir-Riħ
- Il-Misraħ
- Iż-Żinżla
- Kunċizzjoni
- Ta' Fantin
- Ta' Gerżuma
- Ta' Namura
- Ta' Sirena
- Tal-Marġa
- Ras ir-Raħeb
- Wied Gerżuma
- Wied il-Baħrija
- Wied iż-Żebbuġ
- Wied Rini
- Wied tal-Marġa

== Baħrija Main Roads ==
- Triq Fomm ir-Riħ (Fomm ir-Riħ Road)
- Triq il-Palazz (Palace Street)
- Triq is-Sajf ta' San Martin (St Martin's Summer Street)
- Triq L-Imtaħleb (Mtaħleb Road)
