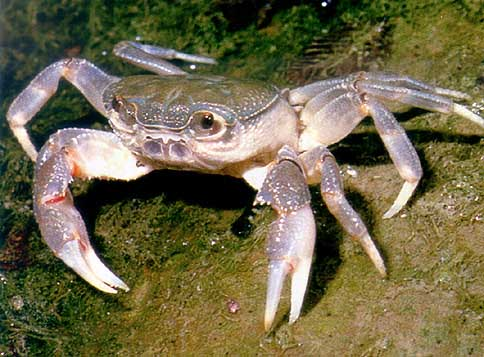

Conservation status
- Near Threatened (IUCN 3.1)

Scientific classification
- Kingdom: Animalia
- Phylum: Arthropoda
- Clade: Pancrustacea
- Class: Malacostraca
- Order: Decapoda
- Suborder: Pleocyemata
- Infraorder: Brachyura
- Family: Potamidae
- Genus: Potamon
- Species: P. fluviatile

Binomial name
- Potamon fluviatile (Herbst, 1785)
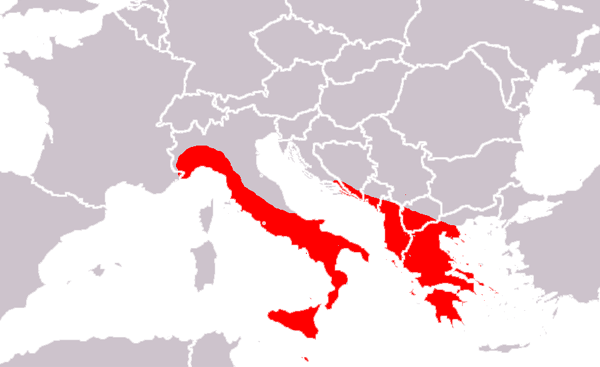

Synonyms
- Potamophilus edule; Potamon edule; Potamon edulis; Thelphusa fluviatilis; Cancer fluviatilis

= Potamon fluviatile =

Species of crab

Potamon fluviatile is a freshwater crab found in or near wooded streams, rivers and lakes in Southern Europe. It is an omnivore with broad ecological tolerances, and adults typically reach 50 mm (2 in) in size during their 10–12 year lifespan. They inhabit burrows and are aggressive, apparently outcompeting native crayfish.

P. fluviatile has been harvested for food since classical antiquity, and is now threatened by overexploitation. Many of the island populations are particularly vulnerable, and the Maltese subspecies has become a conservation icon. A population in Rome may have been brought there before the founding of the Roman Empire.

== Description ==
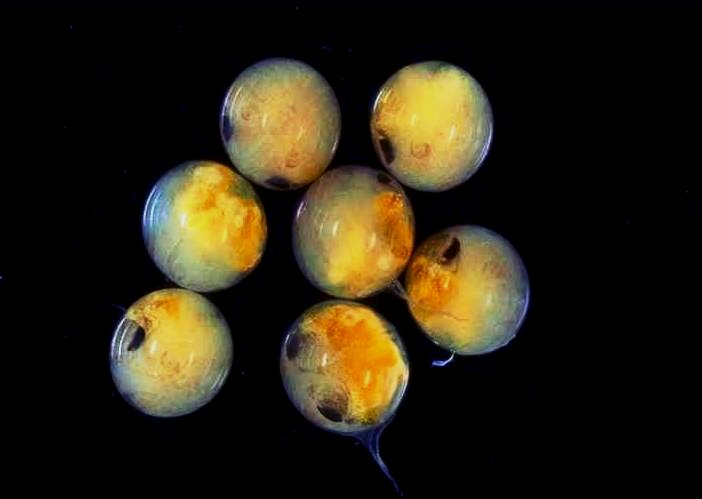
Eggs containing fully formed juvenile crabs

Adult Potamon fluviatile may reach a carapace length of 50 millimetres (2.0 in), with females being generally smaller than males. As with other crabs, the body is roughly square, with the reduced abdomen tucked beneath the thorax. The thorax bears five pairs of legs, the first of which is armed with large claws.

The life span of P. fluviatile is typically 10–12 years. Moulting does not occur in winter. Mating lasts between 30 min and 21 hours, with spawning usually taking place in August. Females carry the eggs on their pleopods (appendages on the abdomen) until they hatch directly into juvenile crabs, having passed through the larval stages inside the egg.

Potamon fluviatile is edible, as indicated by its alternative specific epithet edulis, and was known to the ancient Greeks; it is probably this species which they depicted on medals found at Agrigento, Sicily. More recently, the species was depicted on the 5¢ coin in the last series of Maltese coins before the introduction of the Euro there in 2007.

== Ecology ==
Potamon fluviatile has a generalist diet, feeding on vegetable debris, scraping algae from surfaces, or preying on frogs, tadpoles, and various invertebrates, such as insect larvae, snails or worms. No predator seems to specialise on P. fluviatile, but a number of animals take it opportunistically, including rats, foxes, weasels, wild pigs, otters, birds of prey and jays. The most significant predator may be mankind, with individual prospectors able to catch 3,000 to 10,000 in one season.

Adults occupy burrows, while smaller individuals shelter under stones. The entrances to the burrows may be more than 5 m (16 ft) from the stream's edge and are always above water level. The burrows may be more than 80 cm (31 in) long, and probably serve to protect the crabs from extreme cold.

Potamon fluviatile is an aggressive species, mostly attacking with the larger right claw, since 90% of individuals are right-handed.

In the Tosco-Emilian Apennines, P. fluviatile is only found south of the watershed, in contrast with the crayfish Austropotamobius pallipes, which occurs on both sides on the mountains. Although their ranges overlap, the two species do not inhabit the same water courses, apparently because the crab outcompetes the crayfish, which is therefore forced to live in less favourable locations where the crab cannot survive. Non-indigenous crayfish may pose a greater threat to P. fluviatile than native crayfish, although the greatest threats remain pollution, overfishing and the draining of wetlands.

== Distribution ==
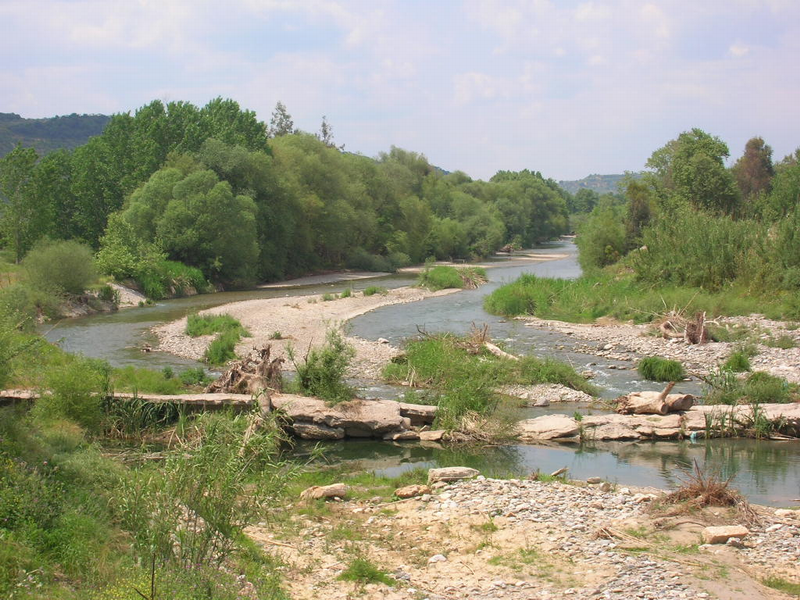
The Evrotas River, near Sparta – habitat for Potamon fluviatile

The natural range of Potamon fluviatile is highly fragmented, and covers parts of many countries with a Mediterranean coastline. It is found in mainland Italy and on the Balkan Peninsula from Dalmatia to the Axios River in Greece. It is also found on a number of islands, including Sicily, Malta and Gozo, the Ionian Islands, Aegean Islands, Sporades and Andros in the Cyclades. Although the species as a whole is widespread, it is declining in numbers, and these insular populations are particularly vulnerable.

=== Italy ===
Potamon fluviatile is widely distributed in much of mainland Italy, especially in the regions of Lombardy, Veneto, Liguria, Tuscany, Umbria, Lazio, Campania, Apulia, and Calabria, as well as on the island of Sicily. Although it used to be found as far north as Lake Garda, P. fluviatile no longer occurs north of the River Po.

In 1997 a population of P. fluviatile was discovered under the ruins of Trajan's Forum in the heart of Rome, living in canals built by the Etruscans which connect to the Cloaca Maxima. Based on a genetic analysis, which demonstrated that these crabs were similar to those in Greece, researchers believe that they had been brought by the Greeks before the founding of the city, some 3000 years ago. The crabs' unusual size, up to 12 cm (4.7 in), and longevity (up to 15 years) are also interpreted as evidence of a long-established population, by analogy with island gigantism.

=== Malta ===
On the island of Malta, Potamon fluviatile is rare and restricted to a few locations in the west of the island. On Gozo, there is a single population which inhabits part of a valley only 700 metres (770 yd) long.

=== Balkans ===
In the Balkan Peninsula, Potamon fluviatile is known to occur in Croatia, Montenegro, North Macedonia, Albania and Greece. There are four species of Potamon in the Balkans, and P. fluviatile is replaced by Potamon ibericum in northeastern Greece. In mainland Greece, P. fluviatile is found in the drainages of the Axios, Thyamis, Aheron and Arachthos, Pineiós, Piros-Tethreas, Pamisos and Evrotas rivers.

In the Ionian Islands, P. fluviatile is known to occur at only one site on Corfu, as well as on Kefalonia, Lefkada and Zakynthos. In the Aegean Islands, it is found on Skiathos and Skopelos (Sporades), on Euboea and Skyros, and at a single site on Andros in the Cyclades.

== Taxonomy ==
Potamon fluviatile is at the western distributional limit of the genus Potamon. Other species in the genus occur through Eastern Europe and the Middle East, and across Central Asia as far east as northwestern India. The populations of P. fluviatile on the Peloponnese, Kefalonia, and Zakynthos may represent a separate, cryptic species, and the population from the Peloponnese was described in 2010 as P. pelops.

P. fluviatile was formerly divided into three subspecies: P. f. algeriense, P. f. berghetripsorum and P. f. fluviatile. The first two of these live in North Africa, and were later combined and separated from P. fluviatile as the species Potamon algeriense. By 1983, the nominate subspecies (equivalent to the current circumscription of the species P. fluviatile) had been divided into six nationes, or "tribes". Natio fluviatilis was found in northern Italy, natio tarantium in southern Italy, and nationes thessalonis, kühnelti and laconis were found in parts of Greece. The geographical distribution of natio leucosis was not reported, and it was suggested that a further (undescribed) tribe inhabited the Greek island of Andros. Despite this wealth of infraspecific taxa, they are rarely used by scientists, and some have questioned directly the value of defining infraspecific taxa within P. fluviatile. In 1990, the population on Malta was described as a separate subspecies, Potamon fluviatile lanfrancoi, and that taxon has become a conservation icon in Malta following its legal protection in 1993, although not all scientists recognise the taxon.
