= Coins of the Maltese lira =

Defunct currency

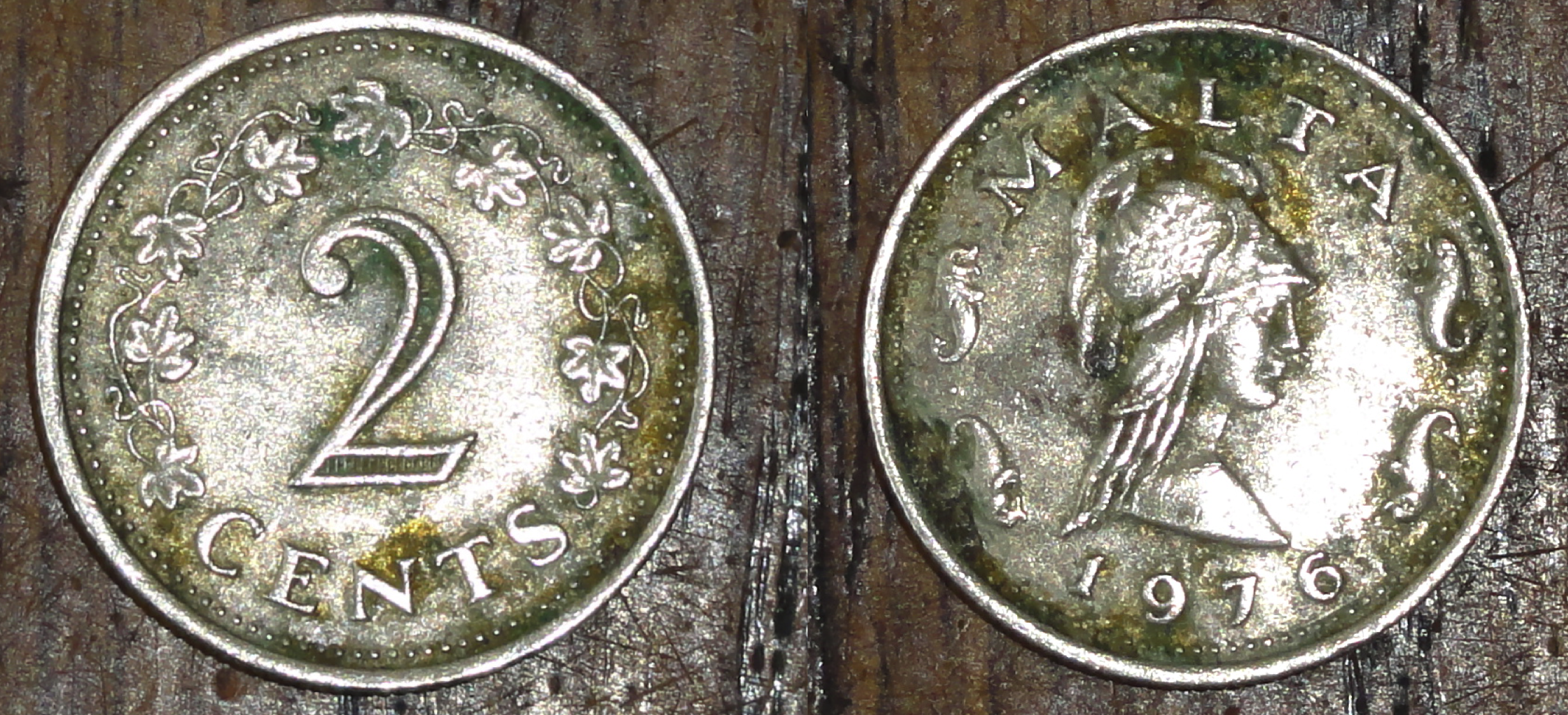
2 cents coin (1976)

Coins of the Maltese lira have been struck from when Malta adopted decimal currency in 1972, to 2007, after which Malta adopted the euro. There were 10 mils in one cent, and 100 cents in one Maltese lira.

== First series (1972–1982) ==
The coins in this series replaced the pre-decimal Pound Sterling which had been in use in Malta since 1825. Therefore, the sizes for some coins were similar to their pre-decimal equivalents, for example the 5c was similar to the shilling and the 10c to the two shillings. These coins were designed by Christopher Ironside OBE.

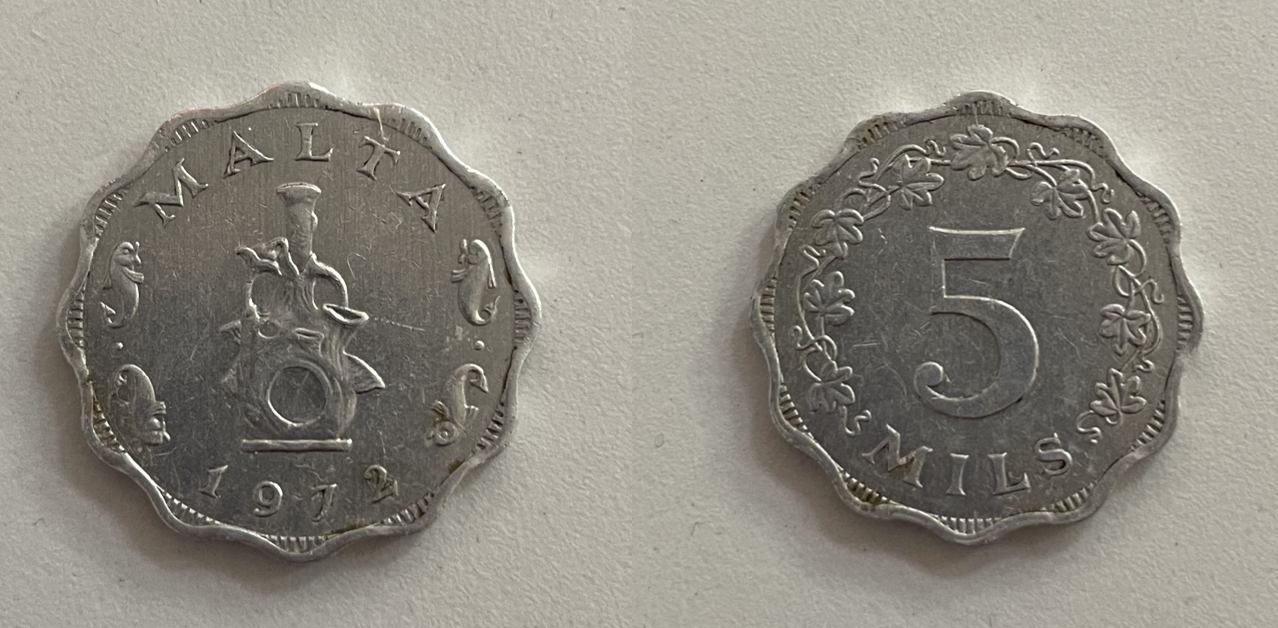
5 Mils coin

In June 1975 an octagonal 25 cent coin was introduced to commemorate Malta becoming a republic within the Commonwealth of Nations on 13 December 1974. The new emblem appeared on the obverse side, and the 25c coin was the first coin to depict the new republican emblem.

First series
Value	Technical parameters			Description			Issued from	Withdrawn
Value	Diameter (mm)	Mass (g)	Composition	Edge	Obverse	Reverse	Issued from	Withdrawn
2 mils	20.30 (scalloped)	0.95	Aluminium	Smooth	Maltese cross	Value	1972	1986
3 mils	23.25 (scalloped)	1.45	Aluminium	Smooth	A bee on a honeycomb	Value	1972	1986
5 mils	26.00 (scalloped)	2.41	Aluminium	Smooth	A lampstand	Value	1972	1986
1 cent	25.90	7.13	Bronze	Smooth	George Cross	Value	1972–1982	1986
2 cent	17.75	2.23	Cupronickel	Reeded	Penthesilea	Value	1972–1982	2008
5 cent	23.60	5.65	Cupronickel	Reeded	Megalithic altar	Value	1972–1977	1986
10 cents	28.50	11.37	Cupronickel	Reeded	Maltese galley	Value	1972	1986
25 cents	30.00 (octagonal)	10.00	Brass	Smooth	Emblem of Malta	Value	1975	1994
50 cents	32.95 (decagonal)	13.60	Cupronickel	Smooth	Great Siege Monument	Value	1972	1994

== Second series (1986–2007) ==
A new series was issued on 19 May 1986, which consisted of 1, 2, 5, 10, 25, 50 cents and 1 lira, all depicting local flora and fauna on the obverse and the republican emblem on the reverse. The 1 lira coin was introduced in this series, replacing a former banknote. In 1988 a new coat of arms was adopted showing a heraldic representation of the Maltese flag, a mural crown and a wreath of olive and palm trees. The coin series of 1991 depicted the new coat of arms, but the reverse side remained the same.

1986

1991-2007

This series remained in use until 2007, being withdrawn in January 2008 upon the introduction of the euro. They were demonetised in 2010.

Second series
Image	Value	Technical parameters			Description			Issued from	Withdrawn	Lapse
Image	Value	Diameter (mm)	Mass (g)	Composition	Edge	Obverse	Reverse	Issued from	Withdrawn	Lapse
	1 c	18.51	2.81	Nickel silver: Cu: 79% Zn: 20% Ni: 1%	Smooth	Coat of arms; year of issue	Ballottra (weasel)	1986; 1991–2007	31 January 2008	1 February 2010
	2 c	17.78	2.26	Cupronickel: Cu: 75% Ni: 25%	Reeded	Coat of arms; year of issue	Zebbuga (olive tree)	1986; 1991–2005	31 January 2008	1 February 2010
	5 c	19.78	3.51	Cupronickel: Cu: 75% Ni: 25%	Reeded	Coat of arms; year of issue	il-Qabru (Maltese freshwater crab)	1986; 1991–2005	31 January 2008	1 February 2010
	10 c	21.78	5.01	Cupronickel: Cu: 75% Ni: 25%	Reeded	Coat of arms; year of issue	Lampuki (Dolphin fish)	1986; 1991–2005	31 January 2008	1 February 2010
	25 c	24.95	6.19	Cupronickel: Cu: 75% Ni: 25%	Security	Coat of arms; year of issue	Ghirlanda (Evergreen rose)	1986; 1991–2005	31 January 2008	1 February 2010
	50 c	27.00	8.00	Cupronickel: Cu: 75% Ni: 25%	Lettering: BANK CENTRALI TA' MALTA •	Coat of arms; year of issue	Tulliera (Maltese fleabane)	1986; 1991–2001	31 January 2008	1 February 2010
	Lm 1	29.82	13.00	Nickel	Lettering: BANK CENTRALI TA' MALTA •	Coat of arms; year of issue	Merill (Blue rock thrush)	1986; 1991–2001	31 January 2008	1 February 2010
For table standards, see the coin specification table.

== Museum collections ==
Specimens of Maltese lira coins are preserved in several public collections in Malta. The Currency Museum at the Central Bank of Malta in Valletta exhibits a chronological overview of the islands’ monetary history, including coins and banknotes issued during the decimal period (1972–2007) when the Maltese lira was in circulation.

The Numismatic Collection of the National Museum of Archaeology also contains examples of Maltese coinage, displayed alongside earlier and foreign issues in rotating exhibitions.
