= Xlendi =

- Suburb
- Ix-Xlendi
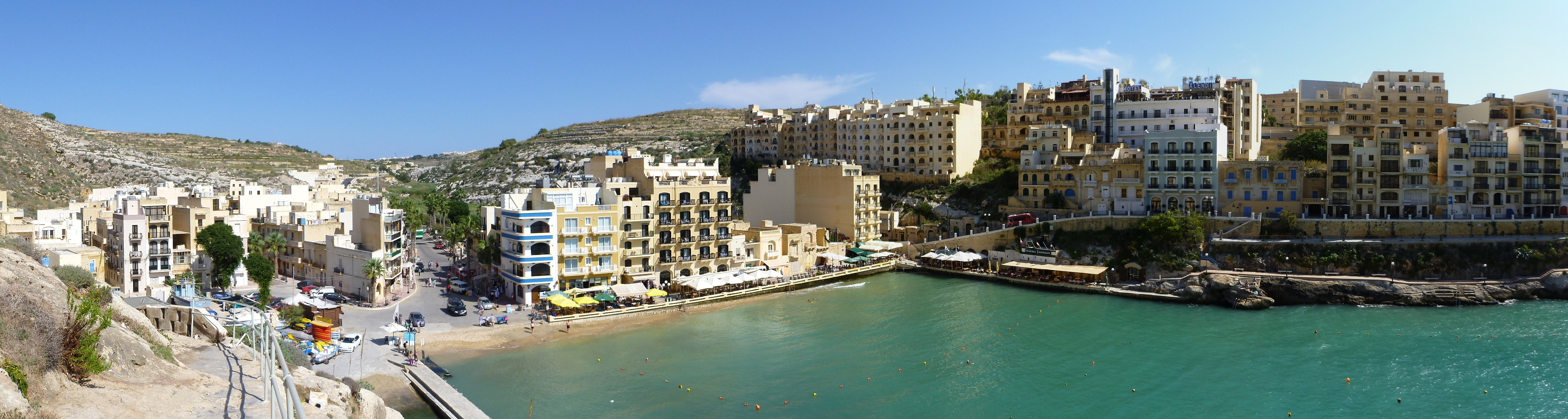
- A panoramic view of Xlendi

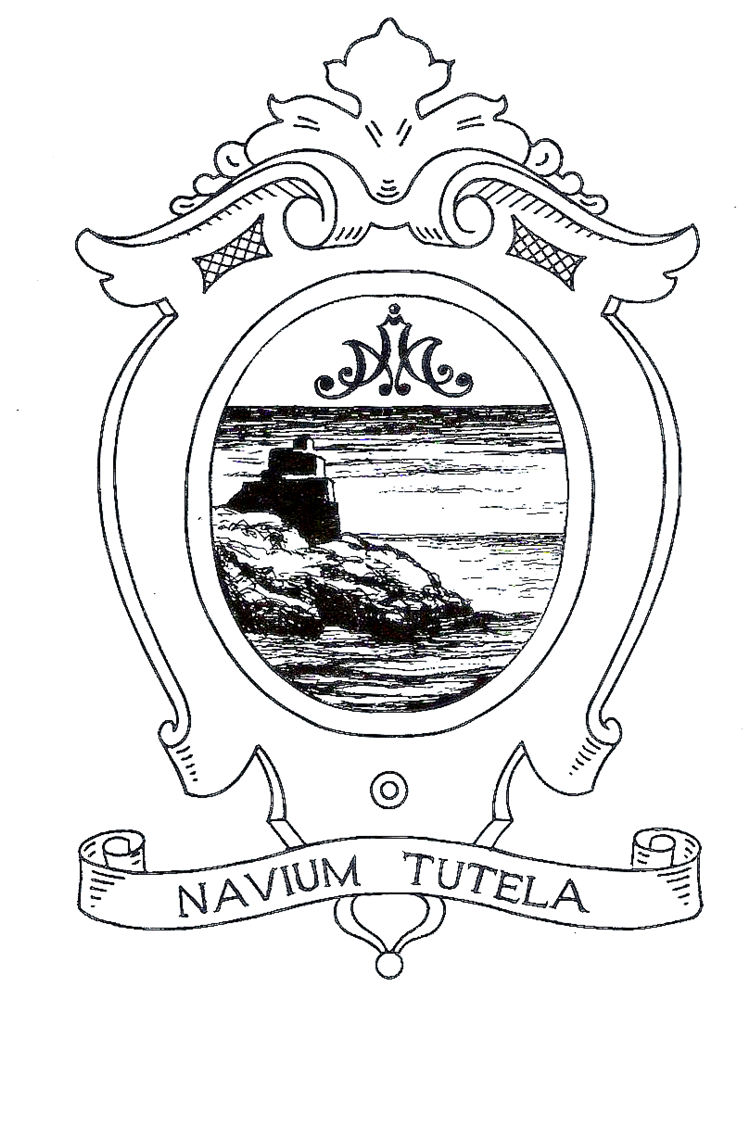
- Coat of arms
- Motto: Navium Tutela
- Location within Malta
- Coordinates: 36°1′47″N 14°13′8″E
- Country: Malta
- Island: Gozo
- Suburb of: Munxar
- Demonym: Xlendin
- Time zone: UTC+1 (CET)
  - Summer (DST): UTC+2 (CEST)
- Postal code: XLN
- Dialing code: 356
- Patron saint: Our Lady of Mount Carmel
- Website: Munxar Local Council

Xlendi is an urban village in the southwest of the island of Gozo, Malta. It is bordered by the villages of Munxar, Fontana, and Kerċem. The village is administered by the Munxar Local Council, but has its own coat of arms and motto. Since March 2010, Xlendi has had a five-member "mini council" responsible for managing local activities and affairs.

== Etymology ==
The name Xlendi is of Byzantine origin. It is said to derive from a galley, the Shilandi, which was wrecked along the coast near the mouth of the bay and rediscovered in the 1960s. The wreck has since become a diving site.

== Historical places ==
=== Punic tombs ===
Tombs dating from the Punic–Byzantine period have been discovered in Xlendi, some at St. Simon Point, beneath St. Simon Street, and others in Xlendi Valley. The port was used by the Romans, as the surrounding cliffs provided protection from strong winds. The bay contains a reef that has caused numerous shipwrecks, leaving a significant number of Roman amphorae on the seabed.

=== Xlendi Tower ===
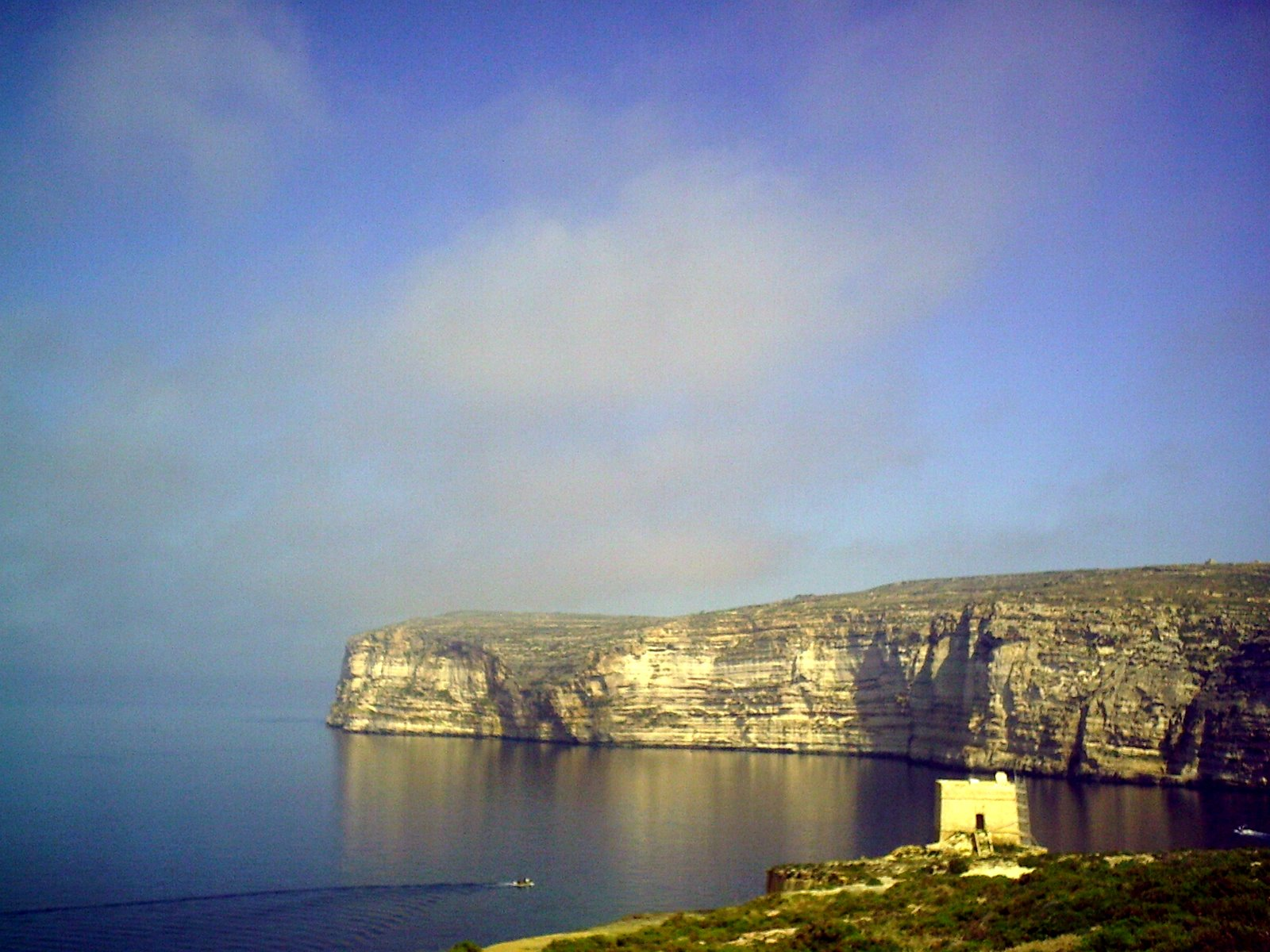
A view of Xlendi

The Xlendi Tower, which guards the mouth of the bay, was constructed by Grand Master Juan de Lascaris-Castellar on 29 June 1650 to prevent pirate and Ottoman incursions from the bay. The tower remains standing, although it had been abandoned and had sustained substantial damage to its outer walls. Responsibility for its upkeep was transferred to the local council and Din l-Art Ħelwa in 2010. As of August 2020, restoration work had begun on its external structure. The tower was used by the British Army in Malta, as it was the only defensive tower in the southwest of Gozo. It was designated "Tower B", indicating its relative importance.

=== Chapels ===
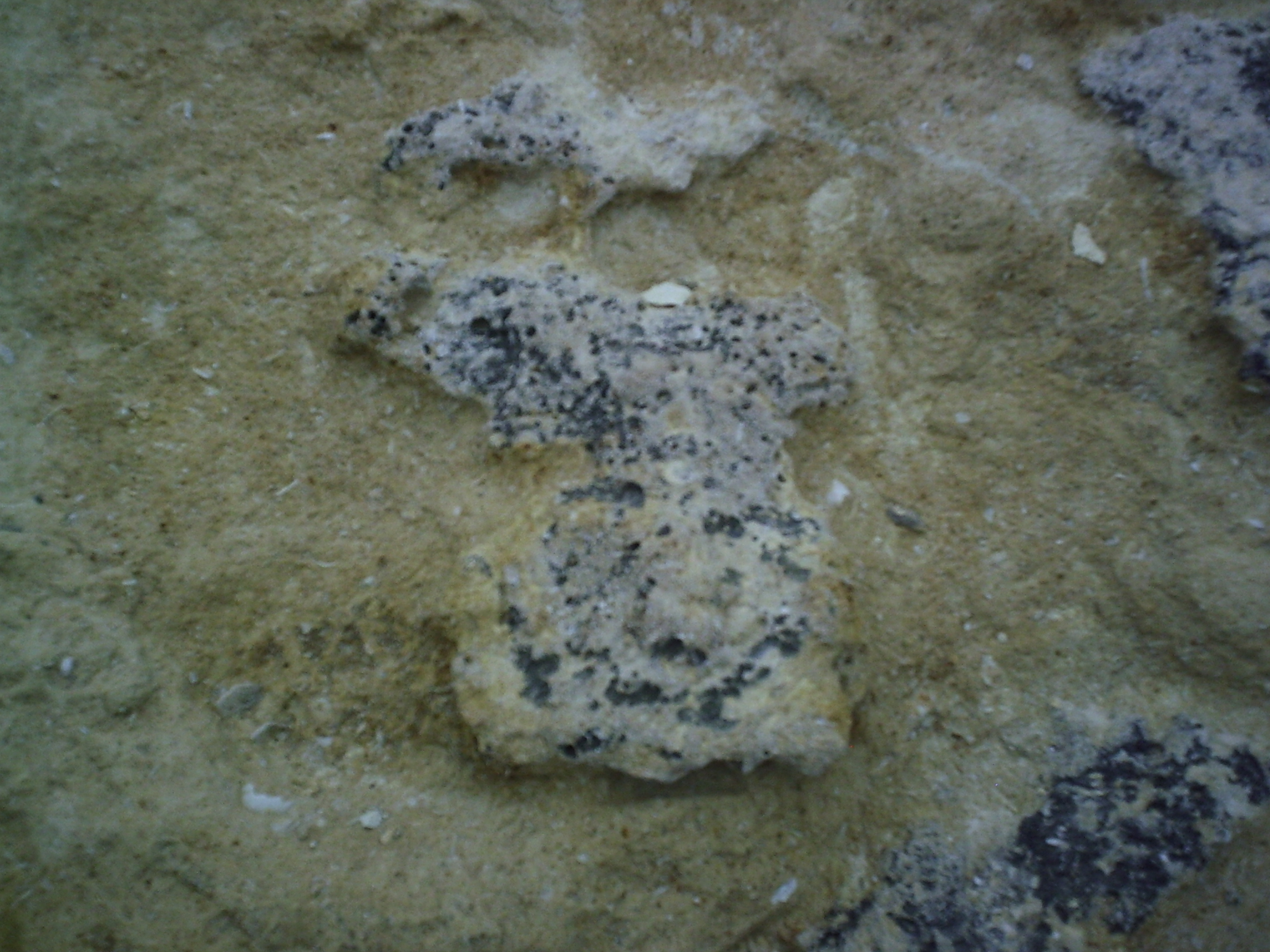
A cross carved in the rock, marking the ruins of a cemetery

During the mid-17th century, Xlendi had four chapels:

- St. Simon Chapel at St. Simon Point, which also had a cemetery. After it was profaned, the bishop ordered a stone cross to be carved into the rocks to mark the site.
- St. Domenica, an underground chapel located on the cliffs overlooking Xlendi Valley on the Munxar side. It was difficult to access and was soon profaned after its establishment.
- St. Catherine, situated above Xlendi on the cliffs on the side of the village of Kerċem. The chapel was built over a cliff of the same name and is believed to have served a small community in the area.
- Vizitazzjoni ta' Forn il-Gir, located between Munxar and Xlendi. It was reportedly not well frequented, and little information about it survives.

All four chapels were profaned between the 1650s and 1680s.

The current church, dedicated to Our Lady of Mount Carmel, was consecrated in 1974, although parts of the building date back to 1868. Each year, on the first Sunday of September, a feast in honour of the patron saint is celebrated. Afternoon festivities include water games held in the bay and the traditional 'gostra', a greasy-pole competition in which participants attempt to reach a flag. In the evening, a procession with the statue of Our Lady of Mount Carmel takes place around the village.

A statue of Saint Andrew (Sant Indrija), patron saint of fishermen, was erected and inaugurated in 1882 in the section of Xlendi Bay used for storing boats during the winter months. Each year, on 30 November, the statue is decorated with lights and flowers.

=== Underground emergency mill ===
In 1955, an underground emergency mill was excavated into the cliffs behind the Mount Carmel church. The project involved constructing an entrance tunnel approximately 30 metres (98 ft) long, 2.5 metres (8.2 ft) high, and 3 metres (9.8 ft) wide, leading to a large chamber divided into three levels for storage, grinding, and milling operations. At the rear of the complex was a silo with a storage capacity of about 1,000 tonnes of wheat, connected to the milling machinery by mechanical augers. Power was supplied by an 80 hp diesel engine and alternator. The silo could also be accessed from the upper ground level.

The mill was built during the Cold War period, when the threat of nuclear conflict prompted the construction of such facilities. Although designed to be nuclear-resistant, the mill was never used after its completion.

== Topography ==
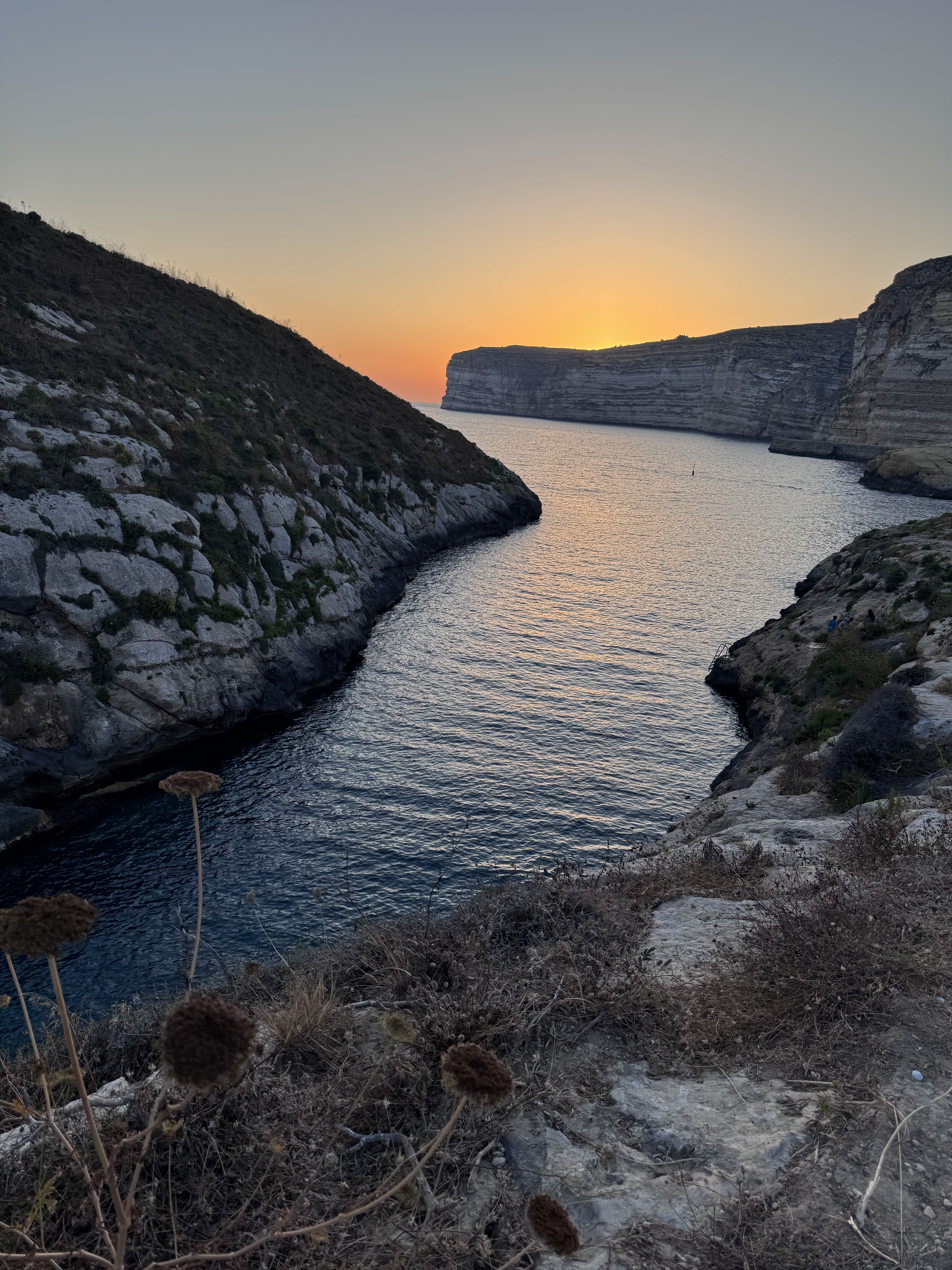
Il-Kantra, the cliffs and inlet near Xlendi

Xlendi has steep cliffs on either side and a valley at the rear, which channels rainwater from the surrounding villages of Kerċem, Munxar, Fontana, and Victoria into the bay.

=== Xlendi Bay ===
During the period of British rule, Xlendi Bay was sandy. Over time, the combined effects of water flow from the valley and human activity transformed it into a pebbly bay. The area is known for its rocky formations, particularly on the left side of the bay, which are used for sunbathing and diving.

=== Valleys ===
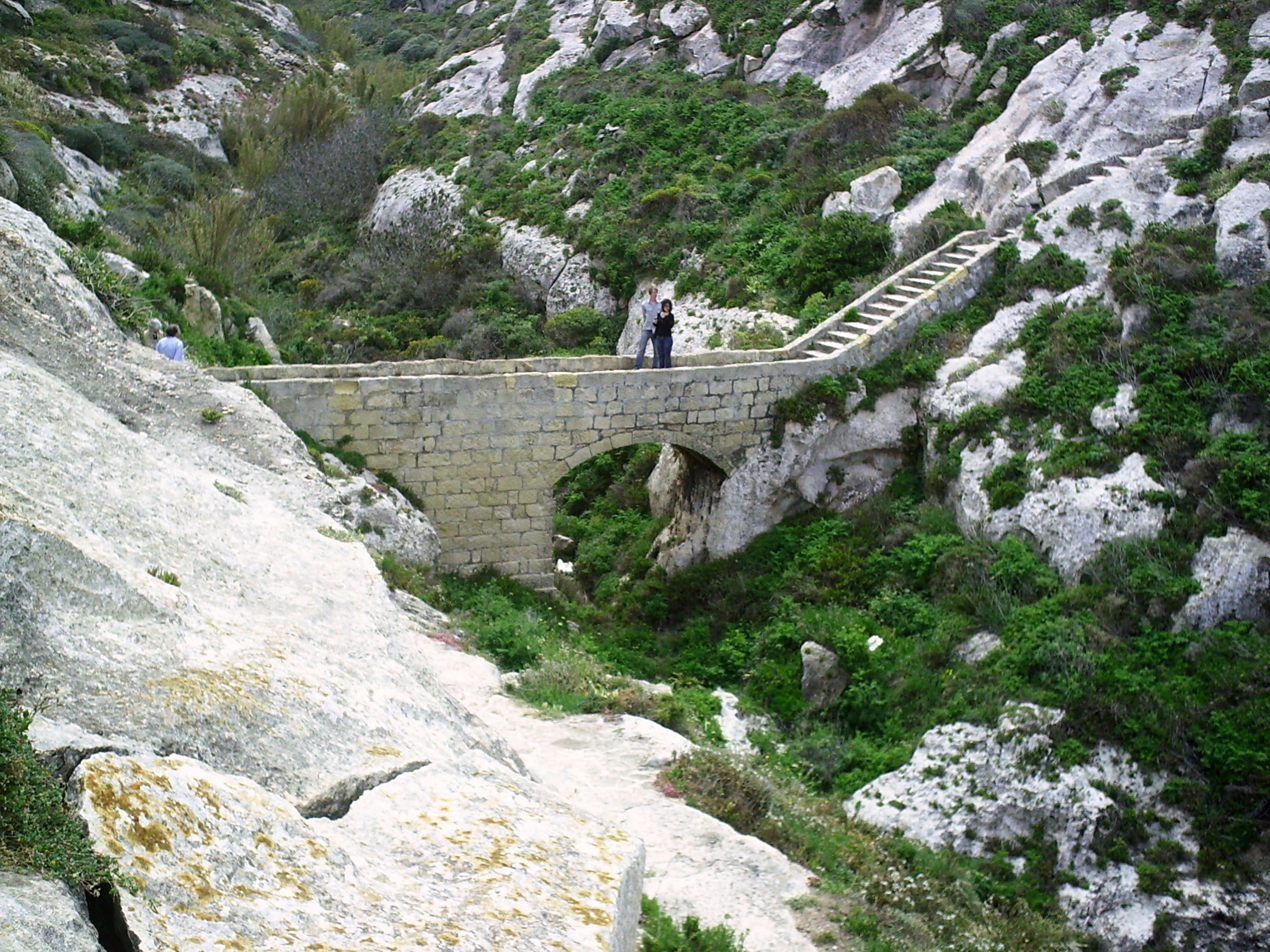
A bridge built during the Knights' period connecting the cliffs to the rest of Xlendi

Xlendi Valley begins in Fontana, continuing from Lunzjata Valley and Wied l-Għawdxija, and flows into the bay. The valley collects most of the rainwater from the neighbouring villages of Kerċem, Munxar, and Fontana. Heavy rainfall can lead to fast-flowing water through Xlendi, occasionally isolating residents and causing flooding in buildings along the main road. The valley is one of the few remaining habitats of the Maltese freshwater crab.

Il-Kantra is another valley situated to the left of the bay, near the Xlendi Tower. The name Kantra derives from the Spanish–Sicilian term Alcantara, which refers to the valley's arch-like shape when viewed from its entrance. Because of its relative inaccessibility, the area supports a diverse range of flora and fauna. The Knights of St. John constructed a bridge across Kantra Valley to provide access to Xlendi Tower.

=== Caves ===
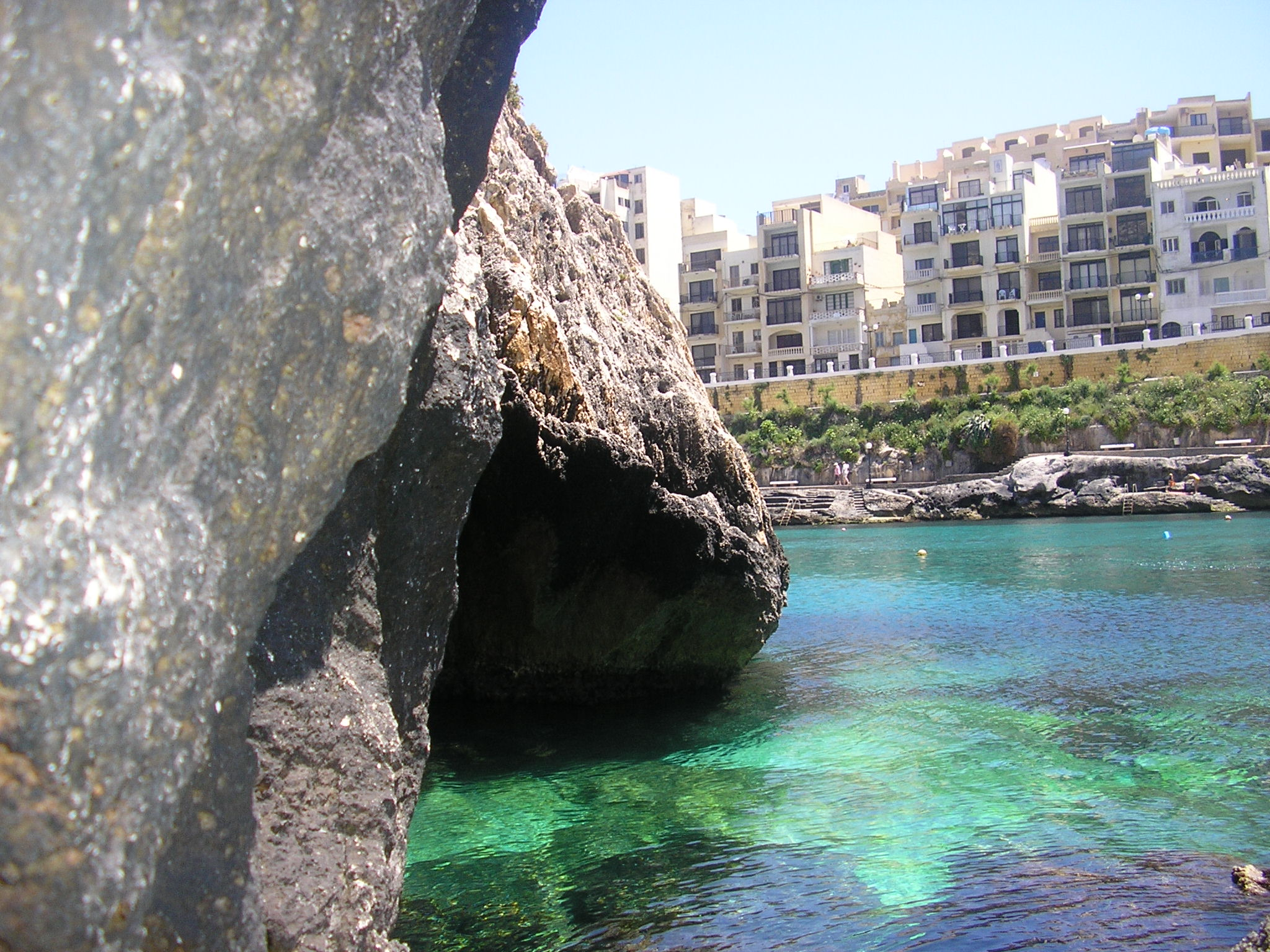
Entrance to Caroline Cave, Xlendi

Numerous caves, both large and small, are located along the sides of the bay. The most notable are:

- Caroline Cave — Located on the right-hand cliffs of the bay, the cave once belonged to Caroline Cauchi, a wealthy woman from Victoria. Cauchi later founded the Augustinian Sisters in Gozo and donated most of her property, including the cave. The sisters used it as a private bathing area during the summer months. It was accessible only by stairs, which provided privacy.
- Catherine of Siena Cave — Situated outside the bay on the right-hand side, this cave is known for its clear blue water. In the 17th century, people lived in the surrounding area and built a church above the cave dedicated to Catherine of Siena, from whom the cave takes its name.

=== Nature ===
The undeveloped areas surrounding Xlendi support a range of flora and fauna, some of which are rare. Species found in the area include gulls, the Maltese freshwater crab, and the endemic plant widnet il-baħar. However, rapid development in recent decades has been reported to affect local biodiversity. The 3 km (1.9 mi) stretch of cliffs from Xlendi Bay westward to Wardija Point forms the Xlendi Bay to Wardija Point Cliffs Important Bird Area, identified by BirdLife International as a key breeding site for two species of shearwaters.

=== Feast in Xlendi Bay ===
Each September, the Xlendi community holds an annual feast featuring music, fireworks, traditional food, and games. The celebrations include water sports competitions such as swimming, paddle boating, and kayaking races in the bay.
