= Xlendi Bay to Wardija Point Cliffs Important Bird Area =

Conservation area in Malta

Coordinates: 36°02′N 14°12′E

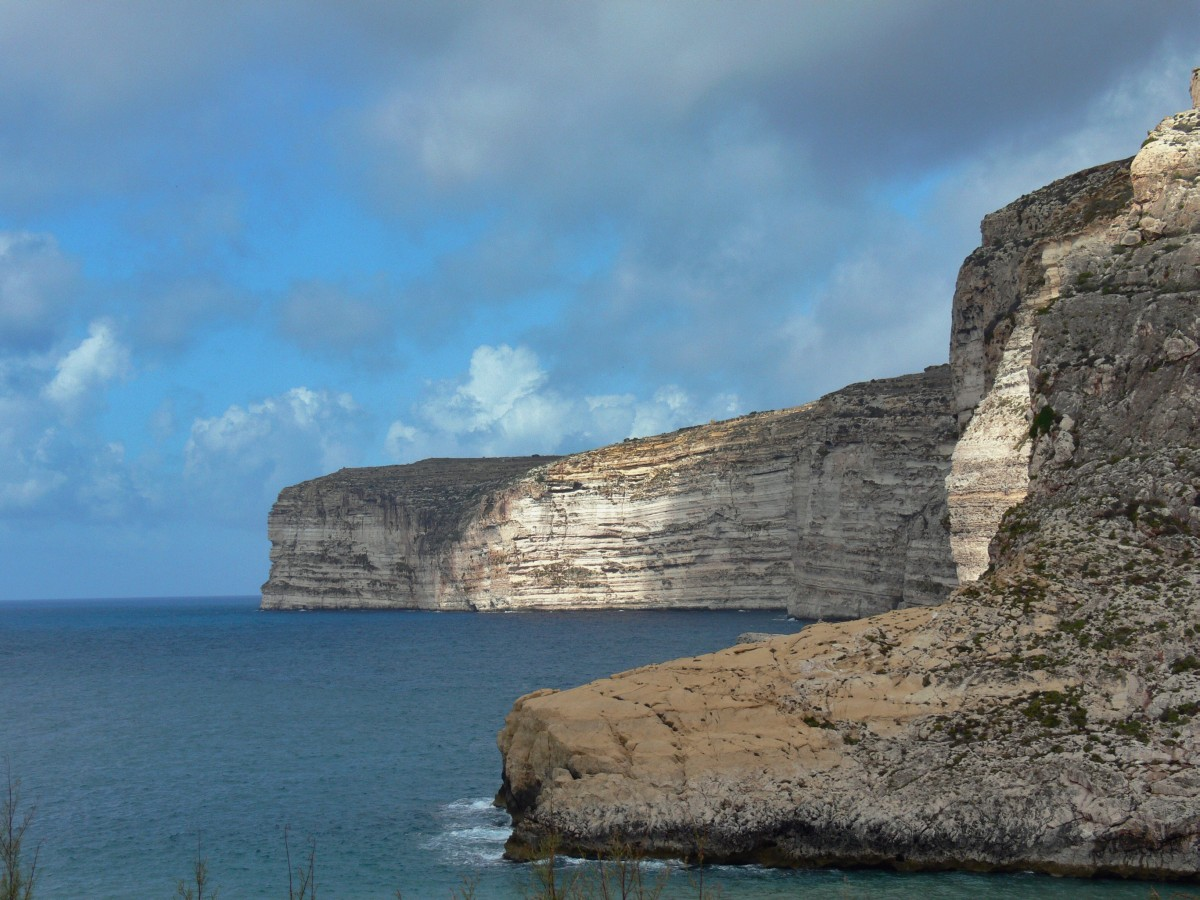
Part of the IBA

The Xlendi Bay to Wardija Point Cliffs Important Bird Area comprises a 32 ha, linear strip of cliffed coastline on the southern coast of the island of Gozo in the Maltese archipelago of the Mediterranean Sea. It extends from Wardija Point in the west for about 3 km to Xlendi Bay in the east, with the steep and rugged cliffs rising from sea level to a height of 105 m. It was identified as an Important Bird Area (IBA) by BirdLife International because it supports 350–500 breeding pairs of Cory's shearwaters and 30–50 pairs of vulnerable yelkouan shearwaters.

== See also ==
- List of birds of Malta
