= Ras ir-Raħeb =

Limestone promontory in north western Malta

Ras ir-Raħeb Megalithic temple and Punic-Roman remains
- Ras ir-Raħeb (Maltese)
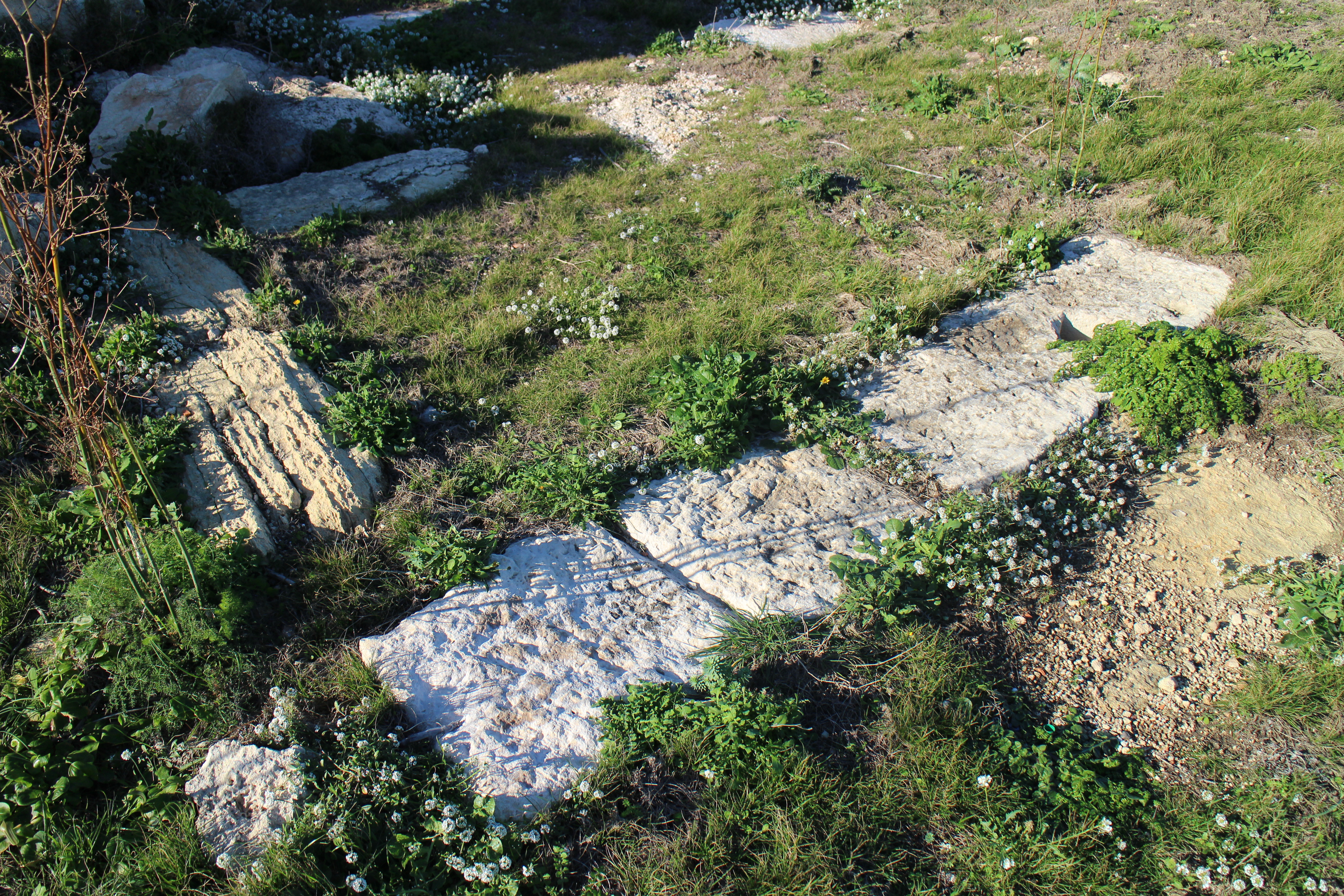
- Foundation stones at Ras ir-Raħeb

- Location within Malta
- 35°54′24″N 14°19′41″E
- Type: Settlement
- Periods: Late Bronze–Early Byzantine
- Cultures: Borġ in-Nadur phase, Phoenician, Roman
- Location: Baħrija, Rabat, Malta

Site notes
- Owner: Mixed private and public
- Public access: Open
- Partly unexcavated, on headland by sheer cliffs

Ras ir-Raħeb, known also as Ras il-Knejjes is a scenic limestone promontory in north-western Malta, close to the hamlet of Baħrija. The headland is located in the administrative area of the council of Rabat. Ras ir-Raħeb lies in the north-western corner of the Rabat-Dingli-Mdina plateau, just off Fomm ir-Riħ Bay. It rises to 45 metres above sea level. The peak allows views of the west coast of the island, as far as the cliffs of Ta' Ċenċ in Gozo. A wide variety of vegetation grows on the headland, including large populations of esparto grass on the clay slopes in the area. The headland also serves as a navigational marker.

The headland incorporates the ruins of a megalithic temple, as well as Punic-Roman remains. Scholars have been arguing about the function of these remains for decades. Interpretations differ from a domestic villa to a small religious shrine, as well as a major temple dedicated to Heracles. The headland is also a popular diving site, which also includes a cave. The Ras ir-Raħeb coastline forms part of the Rdum Majjiesa to Ras ir-Raħeb marine protected area, the first marine area to be protected in Malta, in 2005.

== Toponymy and geography ==
The two Maltese toponyms, Hermit's Headland (Maltese: Ras ir-Raħeb) and Churches' Headland (Maltese: Ras il-Knejjes), may indicate that the site had an established religious significance in the late Middle Ages. The coast between Rdum Majjiesa and Ras ir-Raħeb was earmarked and proposed for protection, in a number of local environmental heritage management documents, including The Structure Plan for the Maltese Islands and the UNEP/MAP Coastal Area Management Programme (CAMP) Report for Malta.

Due to their relative inaccessibility and the shelter they provide, the cliffs and the coastline at Ras ir-Raħeb provide refuge for several species of Maltese flora and fauna. The inaccessibility increases the ornithological importance of the coastal cliff habitat, given urban development decreased the habitats formerly used for breeding, feeding and wintering purposes, activities now mainly restricted to cliffs on the western coasts of Malta and Gozo.

The area also hosts representatives of the main marine habitat types occurring in the Maltese islands with many species and ecosystems of conservation importance. These include meadows of Posidonia seagrass, which support a large variety of organisms for conservation interest such as the noble pen clam. The extensive sandbanks found in inlets along this coast and beyond the seagrass meadows support diverse aquatic animals that live on the seabed. This site is a Natura 2000 protected area.

Ras ir-Raħeb's status as a marine protected area and its geological structure, with caves and posidonia meadows, have made it a unique and popular diving site. An underwater trail for divers, marked with signs, is also present.

== Archaeological excavations ==
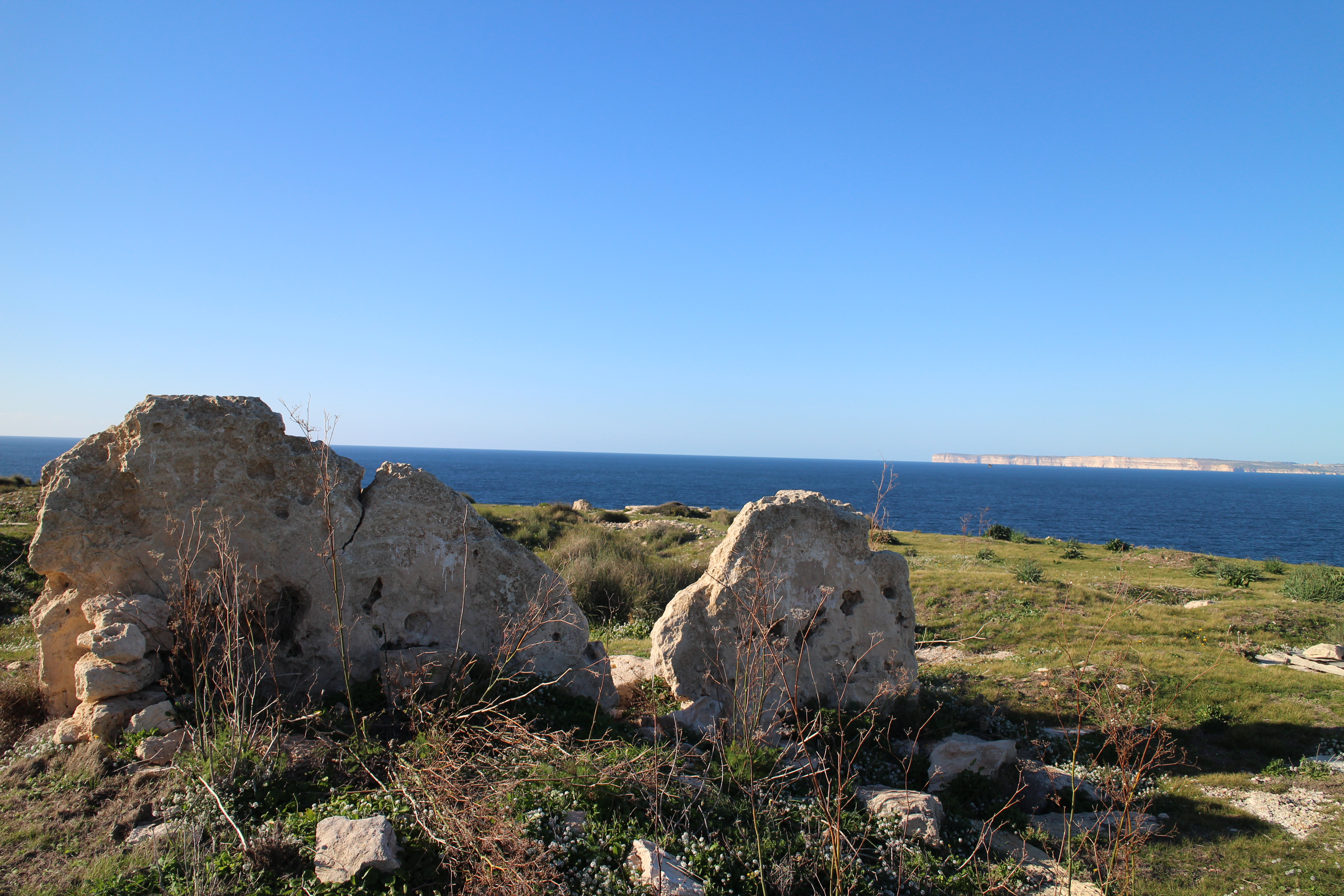
Megaliths at Ras ir-Raħeb

The archaeological importance of Ras ir-Raħeb was known since the late sixteenth century, with attempts to identify these remains with the Fanum Iunonis temple mentioned by Cicero. Other Renaissance historians did not agree with this view, describing only the existence of "ruins and ancient factories." (Note: (in Italian) "Rovine e anticaglie di fabriche.")

In 1922, the remains were brought to the notice of the Maltese archaeologist Themistocles Żammit by the owner of the land. A large, square area paved with "very regularly laid" small, baked tiles, was discovered by the farmer who tilled the field. The archaeologist unearthed "a frame of stonework" as well as the remains of a door-sill. The amount of household pottery, betrayed "a numerous settlement." Żammit went on to state that "the site should be kept in mind as one that could be studied and excavated with profit."

The site was partly excavated by a team of Royal Navy officers under Capt. D. Scott and Sgn. Comdr. P. Pugh. However, the exposed masonry as well as contemporary deposits had been almost completely eroded, making the interpretation of the archaeological remains very difficult. Work began in November 1961 and finished in May 1962, when a party of naval divers explored the seabed off the headland, reaching a depth of over 60 metres. A few scattered stone blocks lying in the sand were noted. The report of this excavation is brief, with the published plan of the site being inaccurate. The team was of the opinion that the place "was used as a sacred site from Neolithic times to about the 4th century AD."

The site itself suggests a building complex of importance, commanding extensive sea views. It was surrounded, on at least three sides, by an esplanade delimited by a semicircular wall which extended from east to west and can be followed for a length of about 62 metres. (Note: The esplanade and its wall are not mentioned in the Museum Annual Report accounts, nor are they listed on the excavations plan. However, they are referenced in the report Excavations at Ras ir-Raħeb.) Today, only the foundation stones, cut in squared limestone blocks, survive but a plan of the cluster of rectangular rooms grouped round a central courtyard can still be made out. The pavement of small white marble cubes embedded in concrete, and a few diamond-shaped tiles survived in one of the rooms until 1977, but by 1988, these had disappeared. In the centre of the main room, there are two well dressed oblong stones, which were thought to form part of an altar.

In the north-eastern corner, there is a long and narrow rectangular cistern. It has a circular opening dug into a block of limestone, with an opening for rainwater at one end. Although no water source feeds the cistern, the permanent spring of Għajn Bierda, which flows a hundred yards to the south-east, may have been deviated to lower ground, providing the buildings with a year-round supply of fresh water.

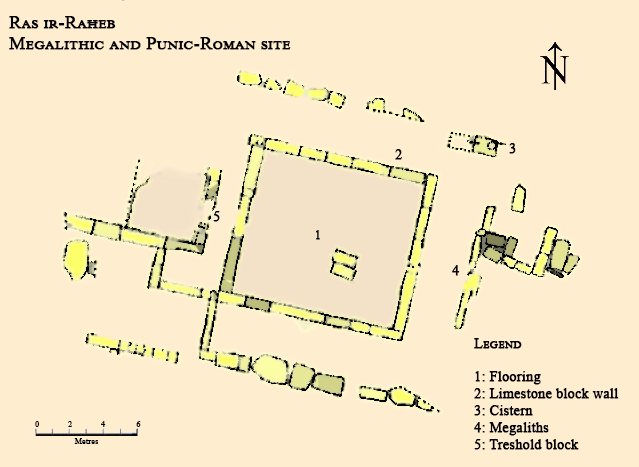
Site plan of the Megalithic and Punic-Roman remains at Ras ir-Raħeb

A main point of interest of the remains at Ras ir-Raħeb is the integration of two rough stone megaliths within the Punic-Roman structure. These are the remains of an earlier, prehistoric structure. The only other instance in Malta of the reuse of the remains of a prehistoric building is at Tas-Silġ where the rear-apse of a megalithic temple was included in building of a Punic-Roman sanctuary. These two sites share a number of similarities, such as the position of the courtyard with respect to the rest of the building – leading to the hypothesis that the Ras ir-Raħeb site may have also had a religious meaning. A reassessment of Ptolemy’s descriptions attempted to link this site with a temple to Heracles, but the arguments are not conclusive.

During the 1962 excavation, a coin of Constantius II was found, hinting at a long life of the building and its possible use in early Christian times. A "great quantity of pottery" found in the cistern included the whole range of the Roman occupation. Four other coins found at the site were in an advanced stage of corrosion, with two of them being classified as Siculo-Punic.

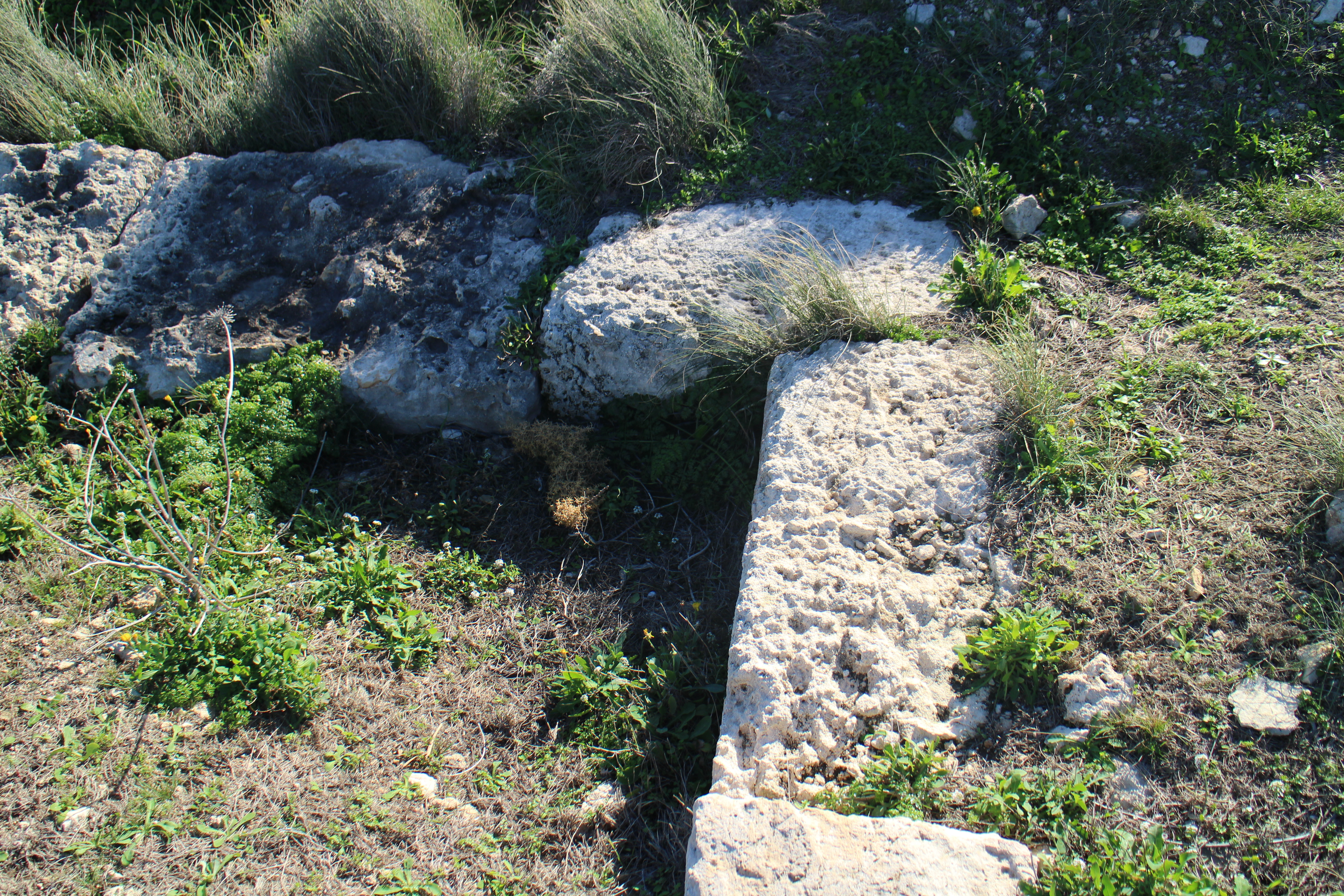
Limestone blocks at the site

Of greater interest is an ivory plaque, with a low relief of a crouching boar that is not of Classical Greek influence and may indicate the survival of Punic culture. Two clay satyr masks on vessel legs were also found, and classified as Punic. The remains of a clay figurine of a nude male youth, broken from the waist upwards, however, is probably a late Hellenistic work. Several other pieces of clay figurines, including another male nude and a draped female holding a small pyxes, a small grotesque head of a bald and bearded old man, and a fragment of a cloaked figure were collected from among the debris. Fragments of incense stands were also found. In addition to this site, a small quarry of unknown age lies south of these remains. It is possible that it provided the stone for the building of the complex.

== Legal status and state of conservation ==
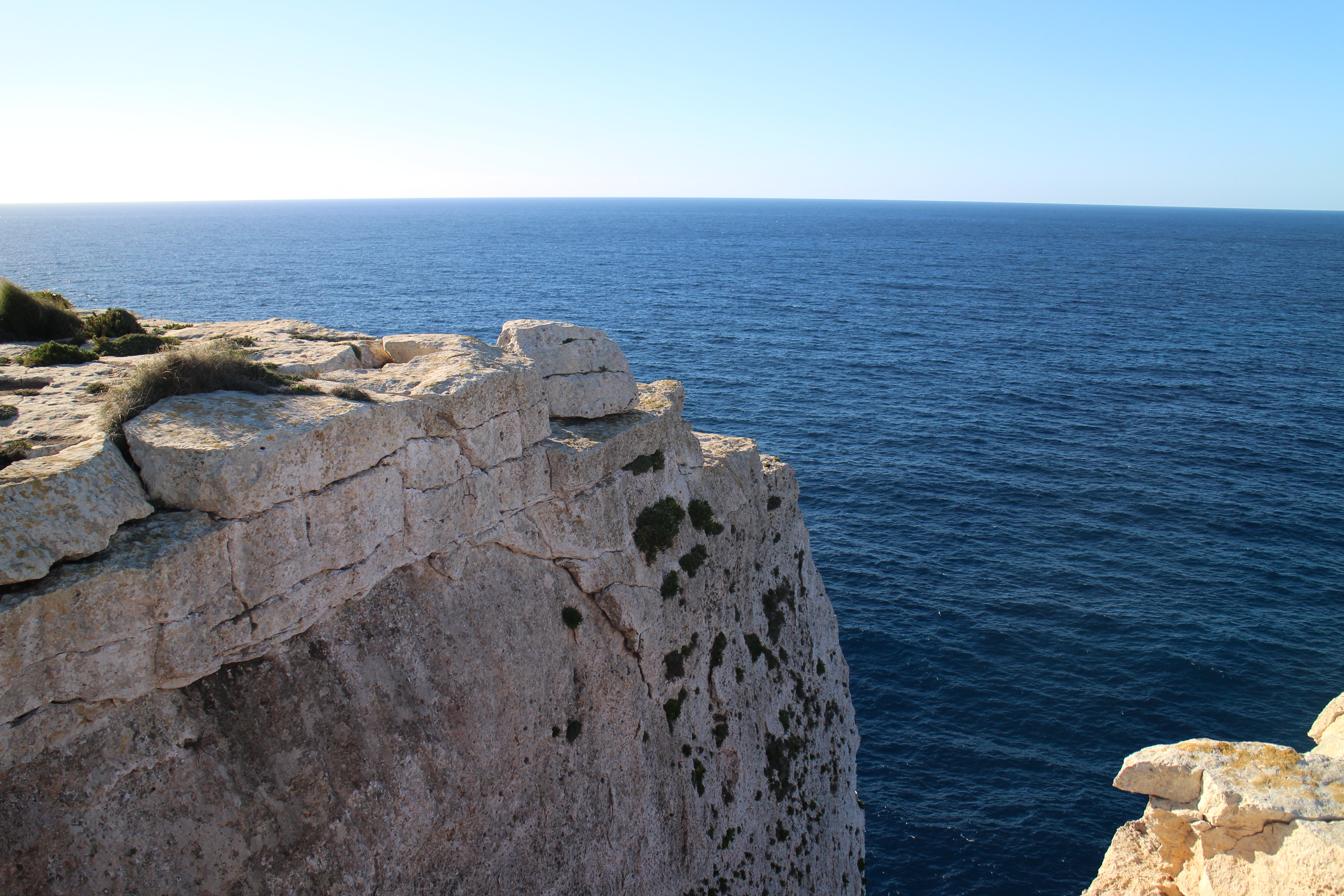
Seaview from Ras ir-Raħeb

The beauty and relative inaccessibility of Ras ir-Raħeb have made it a popular stop for ramblers. However, this has not been without controversy, as the legal ownership of the headland is unclear. A group of ramblers were evicted from the promontory by a local hunter in late 2004. The ramblers included a number of archaeologists who wrote to the Estate Management Department asking how such an important archaeological site was out of bounds to the public.

The department stated that "the land in question is in course of expropriation [...] which was expropriated by Government Notice 498 dated July 29, 1975. As such, legally land in question is still privately-owned since deed of transfer is not finalised." However, a ministerial declaration in 2006, by Tonio Borġ, who was then Minister of Justice and Home Affairs, concluded that "areas that have been taken over by Government through a President's proclamation prior to 1994, even though not paid for by the Government, such as Ras ir-Raħeb, can be legally accessed by the public and not even the owner can prohibit access." The Punic-Roman remains were officially scheduled in 1998.

A large wildfire burnt a significant swathe of the coastline in 2007, with various NGOs calling the general public to be vigilant and report abuse, in an area plagued by vandalism and illegal construction. Some of the ancient limestone remains found on site were vandalised in 2016. Holes were drilled into the blocks, with steel rods and hooks inserted into the remains to allow rock climbing along the nearby cliffs.

In 2016, five tumoli of land forming part of the Ras ir-Raħeb headland was placed for sale - including the ancient remains found on the site. Heritage experts declared that while ownership of the land in questions appeared to be unclear, the recent introduction of a public domain law in Malta ought to exclude the purchase or sale of sites like Ras ir-Raħeb. In July 2016, Friends of the Earth, a local environmental committee, filed an application requesting that Ras ir-Raħeb along with six other sites be designated officially as public domain.

== See also ==
- Tas-Silġ
- Geography of Malta
- Outline of Malta
- Endemic Maltese wildlife

== Notes and references ==
Notes

Bibliography

- Abela, G.F. (1647). Della Descrittione di Malta. Malta.
- Axiaq, M.A. (1610). Relazione della nuova e grandissima devotione introdotta nella S. Grotta di S. Paolo nell'Isola di Malta. Malta.
- Culican, W. (1980). Leeds University Oriental Society – Near Eastern Researches II – Oriental Studies. Leiden, The Netherlands: E. J. Brill. ISBN 90-04-05966-0.
- Bosio, G. (1621–29). Historia della Sacra Religione et Illustrissima Militia di San Giovanni Gierosolimitano, di nuovo ristampata e dal medesimo autore ampliata et illustrata. Rome.
- Lewis, H. (1977). Ancient Malta – A Study of its Antiquities. Gerrards Cross, Buckinghamshire: Colin Smythe.
- Sagona, C. (2006). Punic Antiquities of Malta and Other Ancient Artefacts Held in Ecclesiastic and Private Collections. Belgium: Peeters Publishers.
