= Fomm ir-Riħ =

Coordinates: 35.907°N 14.340°E

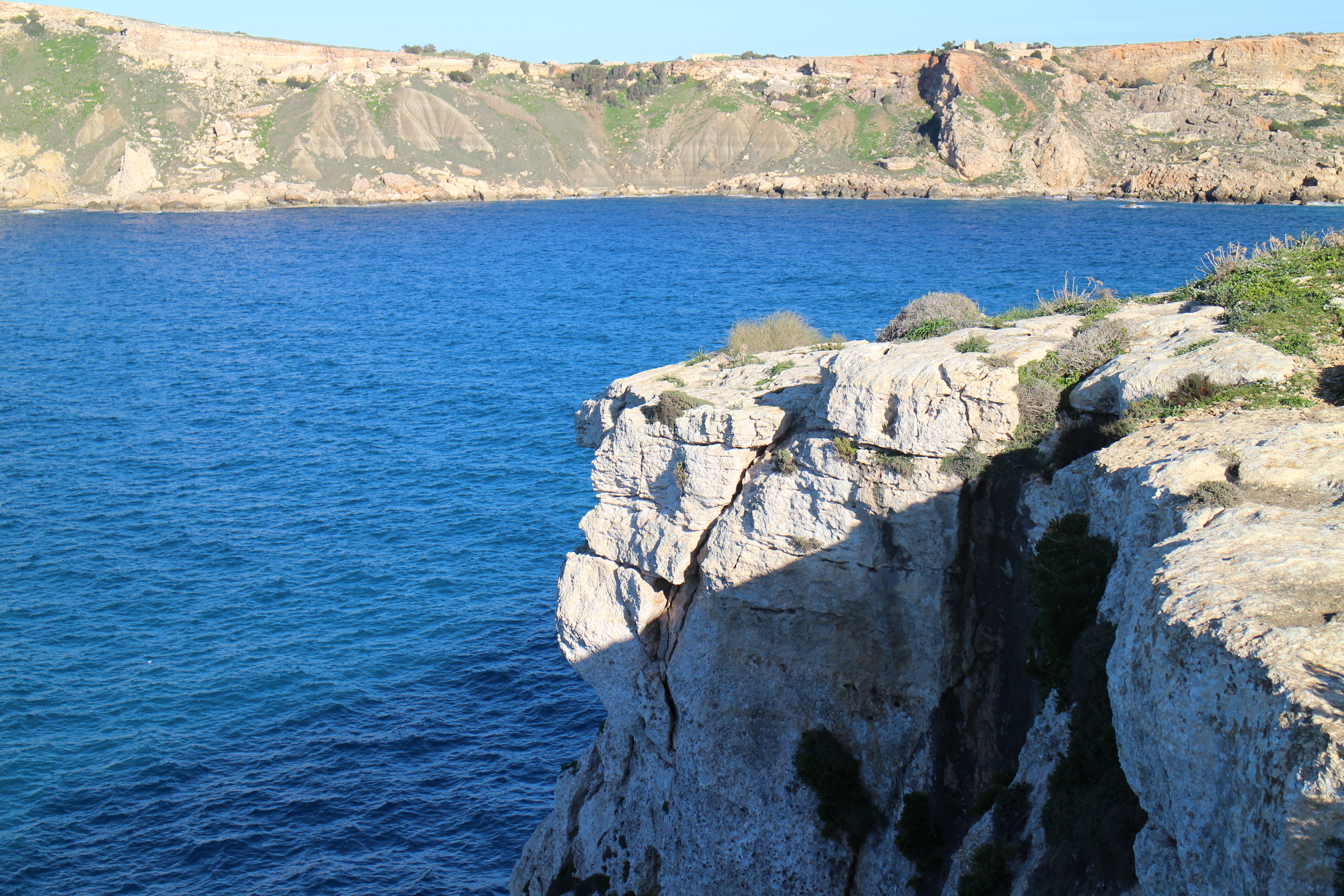
Fomm ir-Riħ Bay, as seen from Ras ir-Raħeb

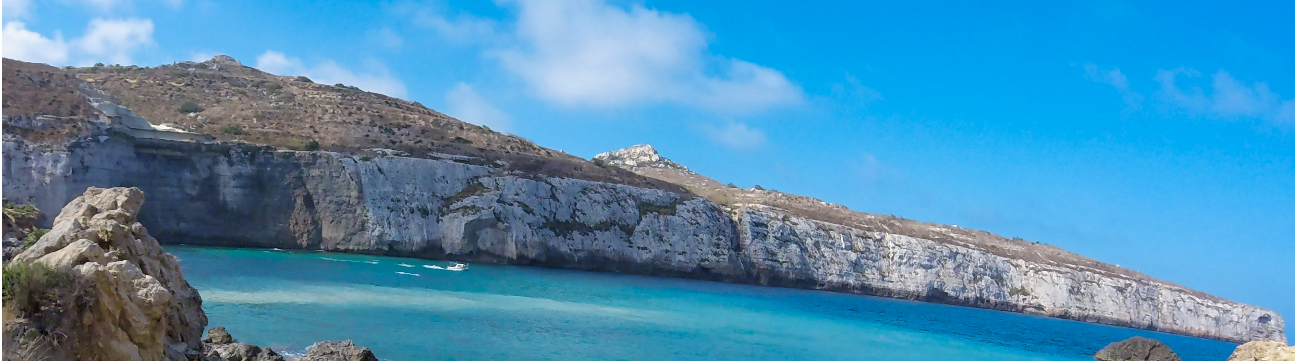
The Cliffs

Fomm ir-Riħ (meaning mouth of the wind in Maltese) is a small bay in the limits of Mġarr on the western side of the island of Malta. The area is characterised by a fault line which creates an interesting landscape with vertical cliffs and a pebble beach. There is also an unusual syncline behind the beach.

The bay and headlands form one of the most stunning scenic views and varied geology on the Maltese islands.

Public access to the quiet pebble beach is disputed with only one road which is currently illegally blocked and has led to protests by the Ramblers Association of Malta to highlight problems of accessibility. Access to the beach is now a narrow path cut into the side of the steep cliff and a climb down to the beach.

The area is also famous for its Maltese freshwater crab that makes its home high above the bay and the sea.

In the mid-17th century, Blat Mogħża Tower was built near Fomm ir-Riħ, but it collapsed in the 18th century and it was never rebuilt. In the 19th century, a redoubt was built in the area as part of the Victoria Lines.

== Cart ruts ==
On Ras il-Pellegrin, the headland north of Fomm ir-Riħ Bay, there are puzzling cart ruts that lead off the cliff top.
