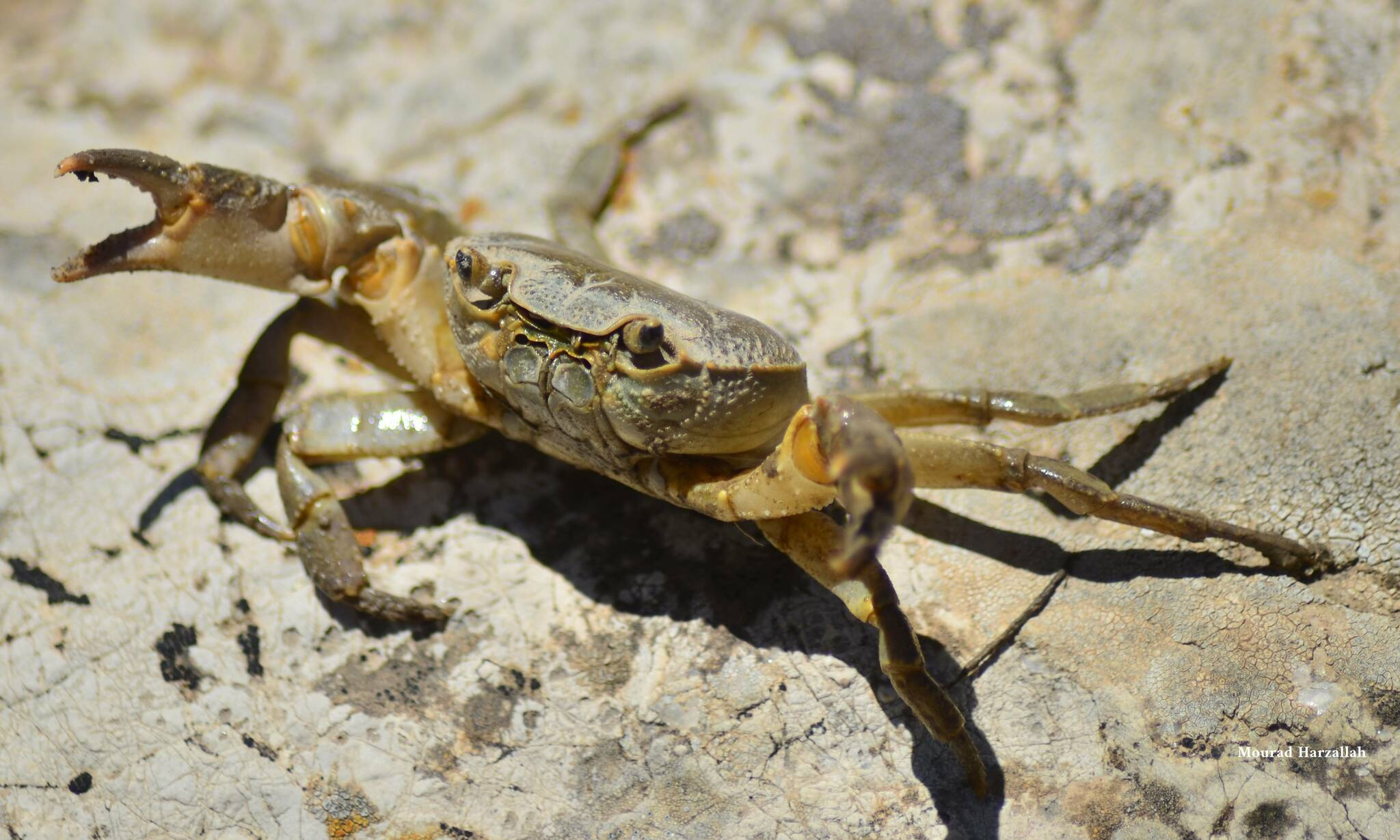

Conservation status
- Least Concern (IUCN 3.1)

Scientific classification
- Kingdom: Animalia
- Phylum: Arthropoda
- Class: Malacostraca
- Order: Decapoda
- Suborder: Pleocyemata
- Infraorder: Brachyura
- Family: Potamidae
- Genus: Potamon
- Species: P. algeriense

Binomial name
- Potamon algeriense Bott, 1967

Synonyms
- Potamon fluviatile algeriensis Bott, 1967; Potamon fluviatile berghetripsorum Pretzmann, 1976

= Potamon algeriense =

Species of crab

Potamon algeriense is a freshwater crab found in North Africa.

== Systematics ==
Potamon algeriense is a close relative of the European species Potamon fluviatile, of which it was formerly considered a subspecies.

== Biogeography ==
Potamon algeriense has a wide but patchy distribution across Tunisia (Jendouba, Béja, Kairouan and Gafsa Governorates), Algeria (Algiers, Médéa and Béjaïa Provinces) and Morocco (Kénitra and Fes Provinces).

Potamon algeriense is the only member of the freshwater crab family Potamidae in mainland Africa, which is otherwise dominated by the family Potamonautidae. It is presumed to have arrived from Italy during the Messinian salinity crisis 5–7 million years ago.

Potamon algeriense is mostly located in North Africa and is slowly becoming extinct in the Morocco and Moulouya watershed areas due to a lack of biodiversity and conservation status . These organisms are having a difficult time surviving due to the overwhelming rate of pollution in these areas. Some still reside in the Moulouya watershed because of their high oxygenated water and low conductivity (Taybi, 2018).
