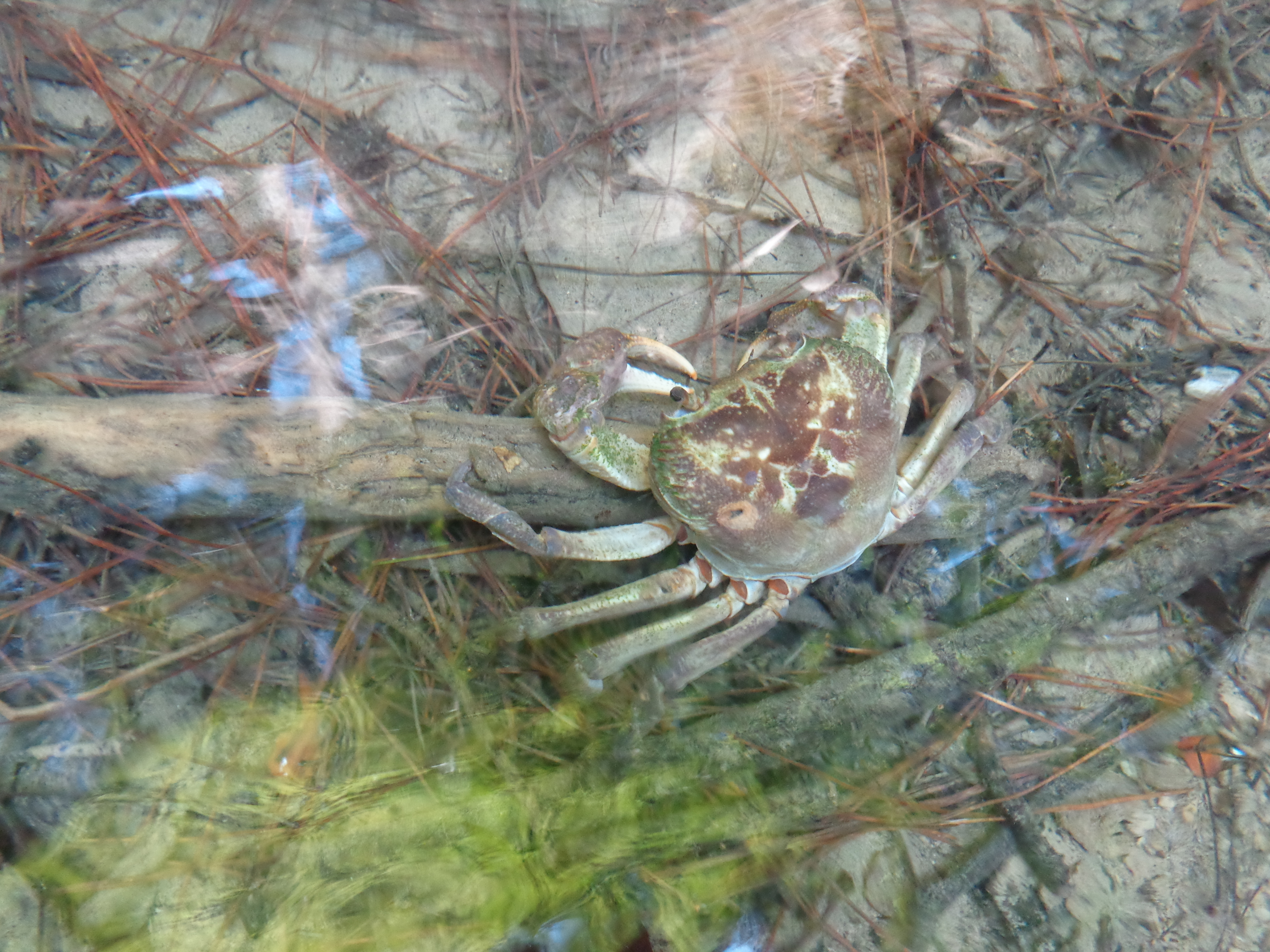

Conservation status
- Near Threatened (IUCN 3.1)

Scientific classification
- Kingdom: Animalia
- Phylum: Arthropoda
- Clade: Pancrustacea
- Class: Malacostraca
- Order: Decapoda
- Suborder: Pleocyemata
- Infraorder: Brachyura
- Family: Potamidae
- Genus: Potamon
- Species: P. rhodium

Binomial name
- Potamon rhodium (Parisi, 1913)

= Potamon rhodium =

Species of crab

Potamon rhodium, commonly known as the Rhodes freshwater crab and locally known as the Valley crab, is a semi-terrestrial crab endemic to the island of Rhodes, Greece. The unique pattern on the carapace seems to mimic a moth.

Like other crabs in the family Potamidae, it is an omnivorous species, and males are larger than females.
