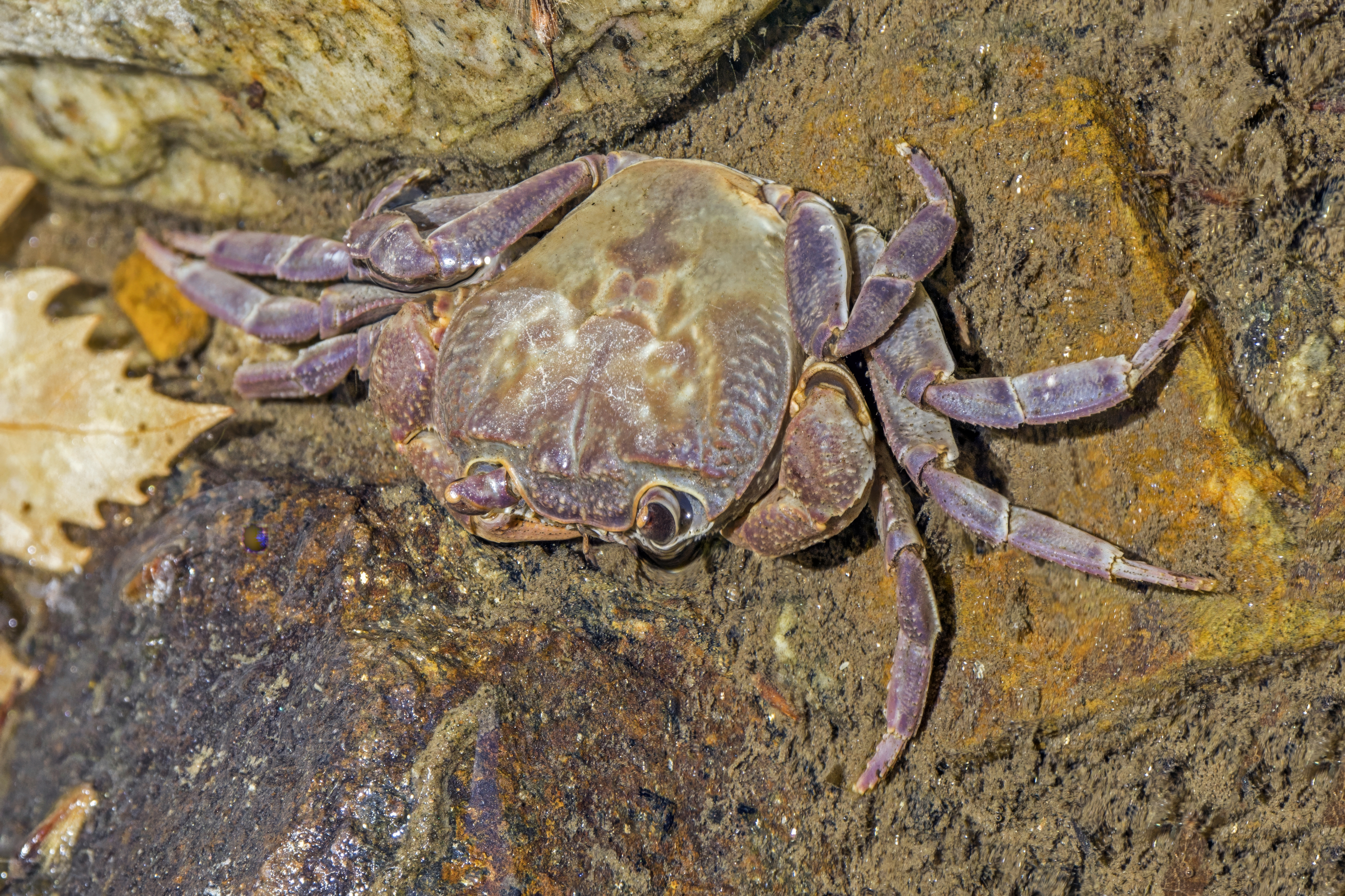

Conservation status
- Near Threatened (IUCN 3.1)

Scientific classification
- Kingdom: Animalia
- Phylum: Arthropoda
- Class: Malacostraca
- Order: Decapoda
- Suborder: Pleocyemata
- Infraorder: Brachyura
- Family: Potamidae
- Genus: Potamon
- Species: P. potamios

Binomial name
- Potamon potamios (Olivier, 1804)

= Potamon potamios =

Species of crab

Potamon potamios, the Levantine freshwater crab, is a semi-terrestrial crab occurring around the eastern Mediterranean, including many Mediterranean islands, extending as far south and west as the Sinai Peninsula.

== Description ==
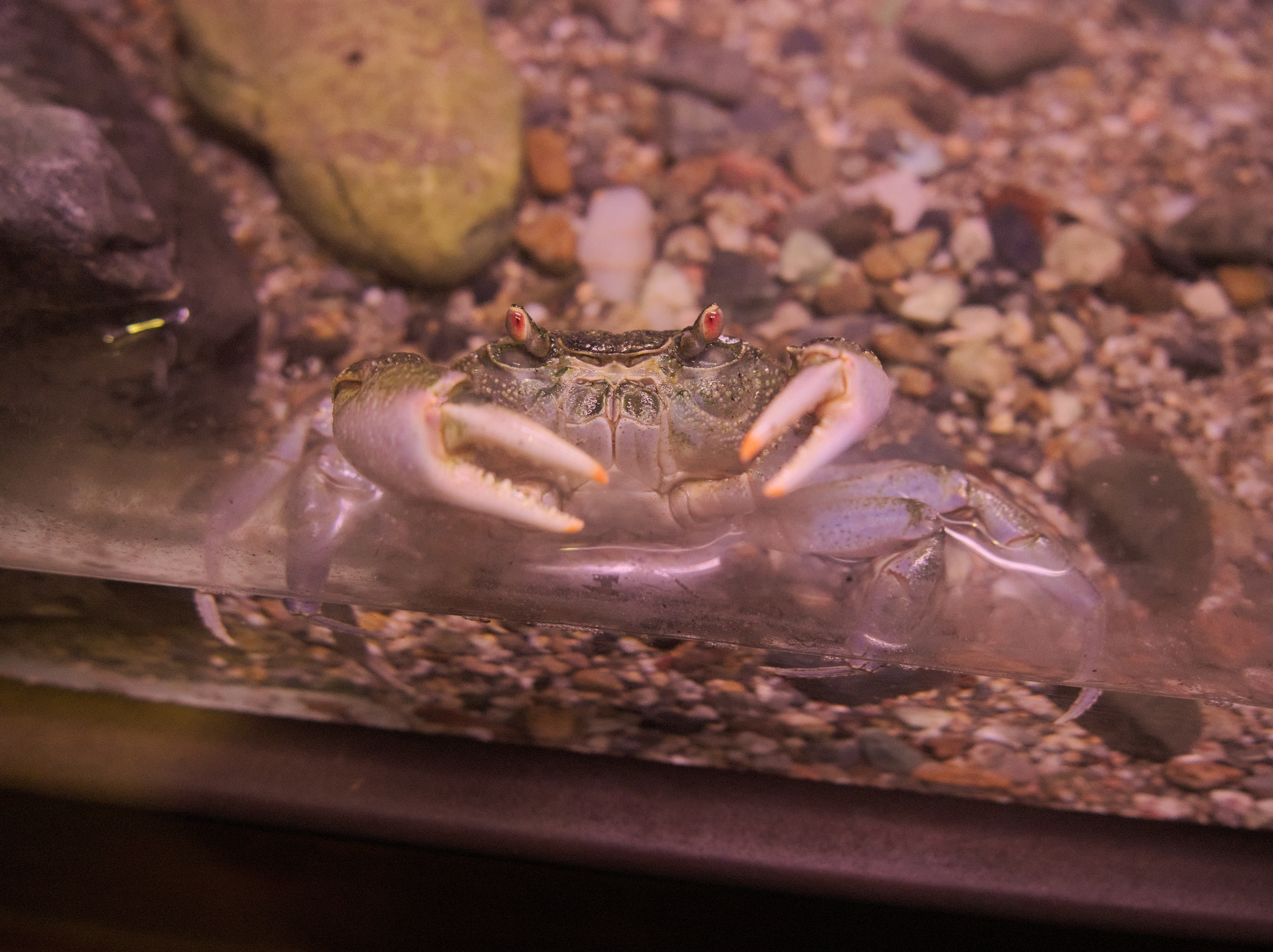
A young Levantine freshwater crab in captivity at the NHMC in Greece

Levantine freshwater crabs have an average leg span of 10 to 15 centimeters (4 to 6 inches) and the males are typically larger than the females. Their carapace is slightly arched, smooth, and concave; and has a size 5 to 7 cm (2 to 3 in). Their two claws are large and unequal in size, and their first gonopod is conical or slender.

== Distribution and habitat ==
The Levantine freshwater crab can be found in Syria, Lebadon, Israel and Palestine, Cyprus, Jordan, southern Turkey, as well as the Sinai peninsula of Egypt and some islands in Greece; such as Crete, Karpathos, Naxos and more. It also occurs in some areas in Iraq near its border with Syria and in Saudi Arabia near its border with Jordan. Its range lies within many ecoregions, like the Eastern Mediterranean conifer-broadleaf forests, the Aegean and Western Turkey sclerophyllous and mixed forests and the Cyprus Mediterranean forests. This crab's habitat includes various environments, though it is usually found in streams, rivers and lakes. It prefers areas with muddy substrates and rocks so it can dig borrows and hide.

== Behavior ==
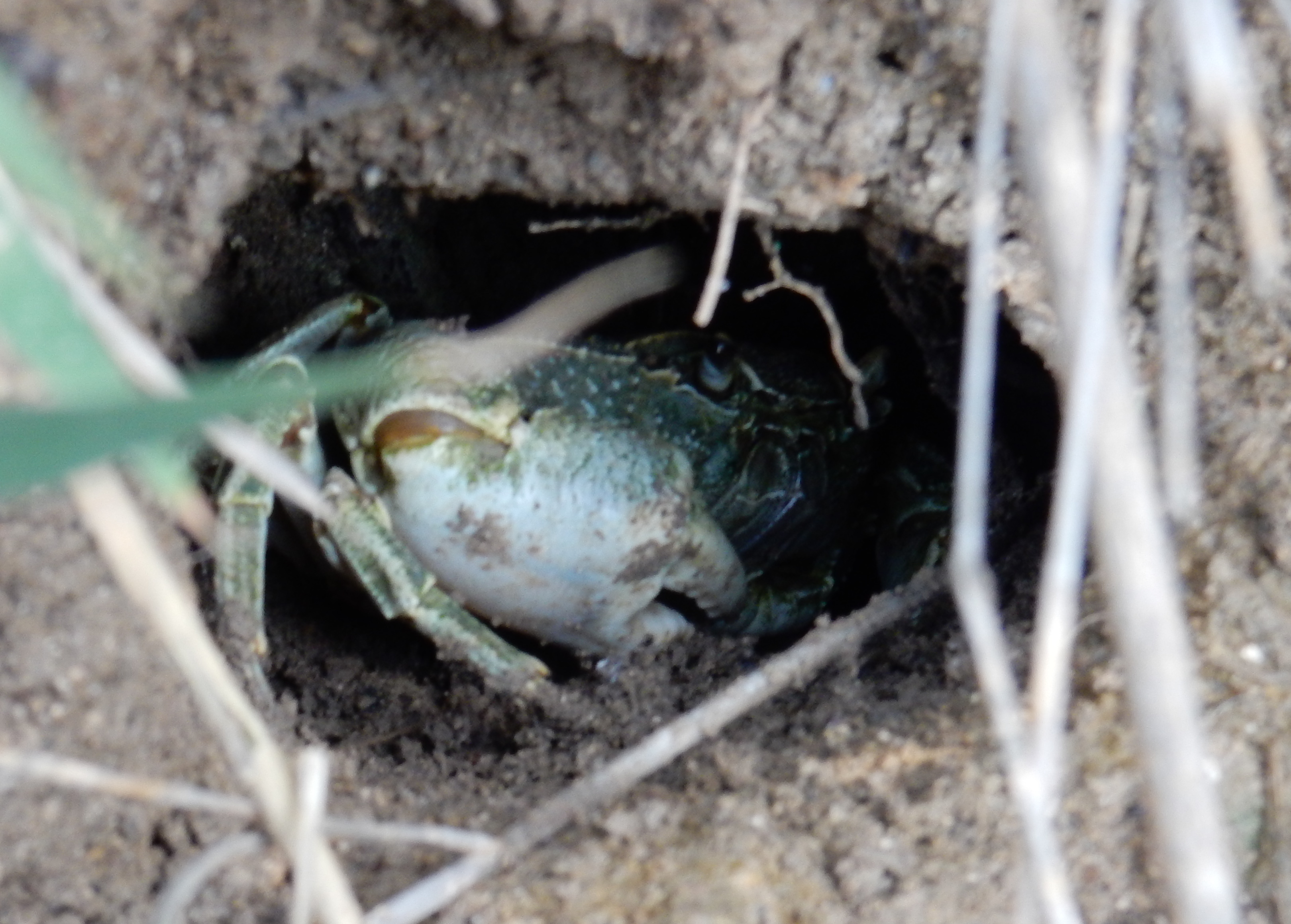
A Levantine freshwater crab in a burrowing near the Jordan River

The Levantine freshwater crab is a semi-terrestrial species that is very active both on land and in the water. They are not social and they exhibit aggressive and territorial behavior, especially during breeding season. In this species, medium-sized individuals are nocturnal, whereas the larger ones are diurnal. During the night, some males spread over the surrounding terrestrial habitats; straying up to 40 metres (130 ft) away from the water. Levantine freshwater crabs are also known for digging burrows in muddy surfaces.

=== Diet ===
Levantine freshwater crabs are omnivorous and they actively prey on small invertebrates and sometimes frogs and fish, while they also scrap surfaces covered with algae and eat dead leaves and plants. Cannibalism is also present in this species in individuals that have a noticeable size difference.
