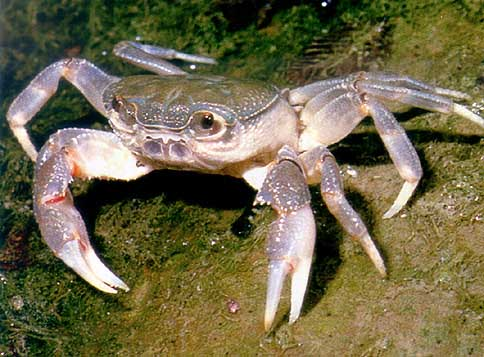
- Potamon fluviatile

Scientific classification
- Domain: Eukaryota
- Kingdom: Animalia
- Phylum: Arthropoda
- Class: Malacostraca
- Order: Decapoda
- Suborder: Pleocyemata
- Infraorder: Brachyura
- Family: Potamidae
- Subfamily: Potaminae
- Genus: Potamon; Savigny, 1816

Type species
- Potamon fluviatile (Herbst, 1785)

= Potamon =

Genus of crabs

Potamon is a genus of freshwater or semiterrestrial crabs mainly found from Southern Europe through the Middle East, and as far east as north-western India. The only exception is the North African P. algeriense, which also is the only potamid of mainland Africa. Twenty species are currently recognised. These crabs are omnivores that have a broad ecological tolerance. The adult Potaman reach up to 50 mm in size during their 10-12 year life span.

- Potamon algeriense Bott, 1967
- Potamon bileki Pretzmann, 1971
- Potamon bilobatum Brandis, Storch & Türkay, 2000
- Potamon fluviatile (Herbst, 1785)
- Potamon gedrosianum Alcock, 1909
- Potamon hippocratis Ghigi, 1929
- Potamon hueceste Pretzmann, 1983
- Potamon ibericum (Bieberstein, 1808)
- Potamon magnum Pretzmann, 1962
- Potamon mesopotamicum Pretzmann, 1962
- Potamon monticola Alcock, 1910
- Potamon pelops Jesse et al., 2010
- Potamon persicum Pretzmann, 1962
- Potamon potamios (Olivier, 1804)
- Potamon rhodium Parisi, 1913
- Potamon ruttneri Pretzmann, 1962
- Potamon setigerum Rathbun, 1904
- Potamon strouhali Pretzmann, 1962
- Potamon transcaspicum Pretzmann, 1962
- Potamon ilam Keikhosravi & Schubart, 2014
- Potamon elbursi Pretzmann, 1962

Many other taxa from Indochina, originally described as species of Potamon, are now placed in other genera, such as Himalayapotamon, Beccumon, Eosamon, and Takpotamon.
