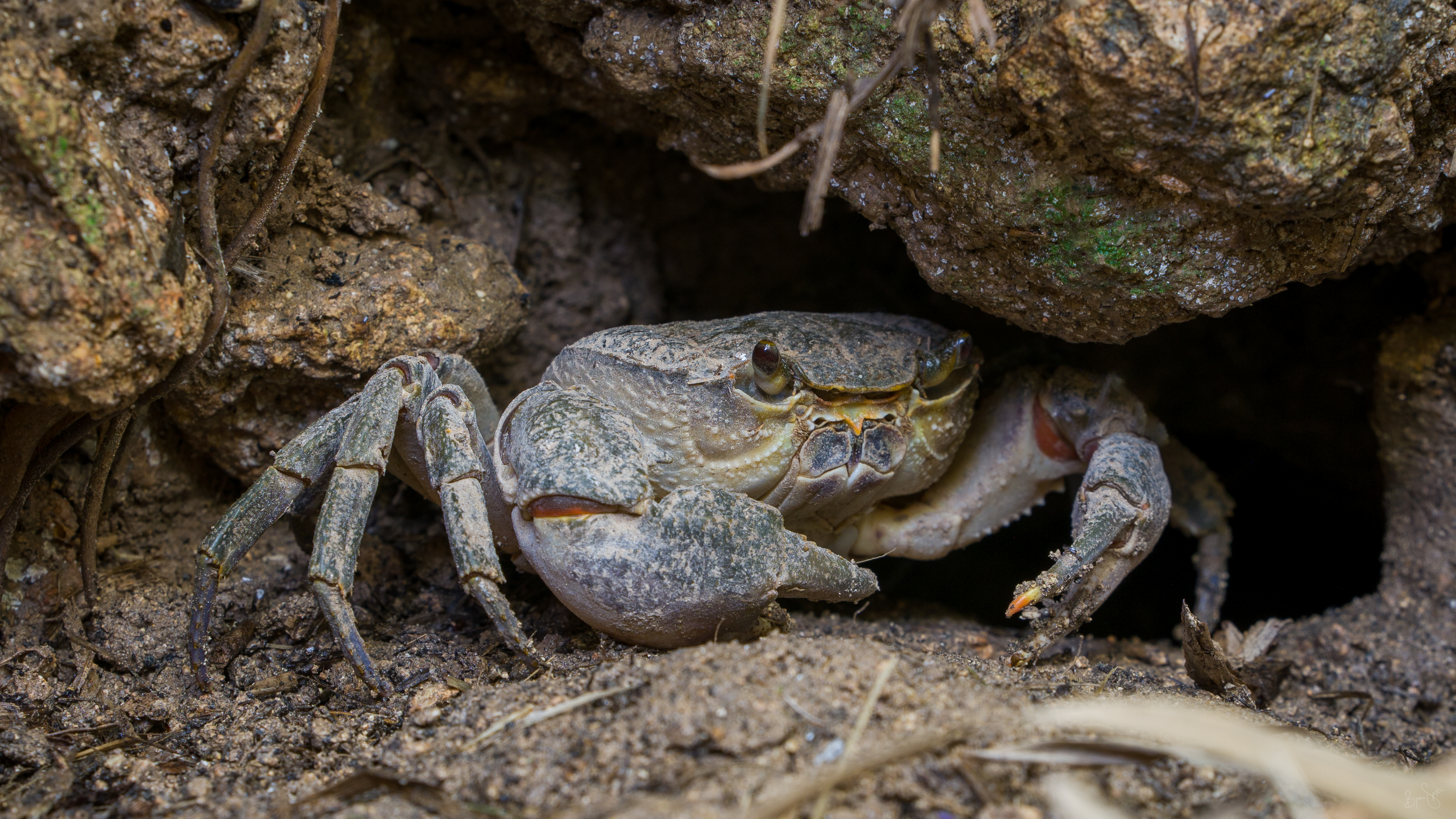
- Potamon fluviatile lanfrancoi (Qabru) in Baħrija

Scientific classification
- Kingdom: Animalia
- Phylum: Arthropoda
- Class: Malacostraca
- Order: Decapoda
- Suborder: Pleocyemata
- Infraorder: Brachyura
- Family: Potamidae
- Genus: Potamon
- Species: P. fluviatile
- Subspecies: P. f. lanfrancoi

Trinomial name
- Potamon fluviatile lanfrancoi Capolongo & Cilia, 1990

= Maltese freshwater crab =

Subspecies of crab

The Maltese freshwater crab (Potamon fluviatile lanfrancoi) is a subspecies of freshwater crab, endemic to certain areas within the Maltese Islands. It is very rare and its numbers have been decreasing in recent years.

== General features ==
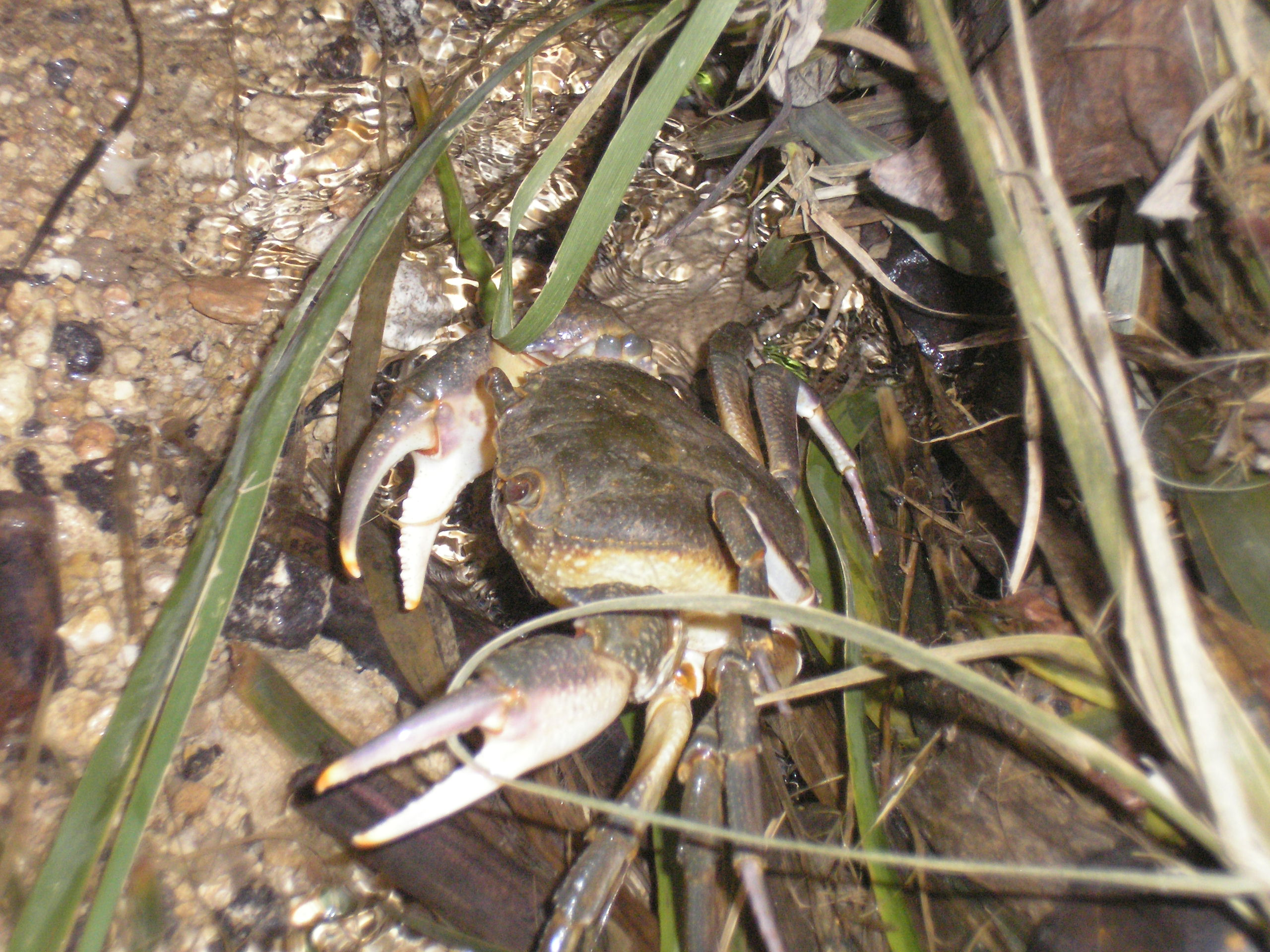
Freshwater crab in a stream in Baħrija

The Maltese freshwater crab (known as the Qabru in Maltese) is a decapod (a crustacean with 10 legs). It can grow up to 80 millimetres (3 in) in width. It is greenish-grey with some occasional orange-yellow patches, and an overall purple hue on the legs.

== Habitat ==
The Maltese freshwater crab is found where fresh water / running water is present throughout the year although it does live near pools and springs too. It is found in Imtaħleb, Baħrija, Għajn Żejtuna in Mellieħa and San Martin in Malta and in Lunzjata Valley in Gozo.

When threatened, the crab takes shelter by hiding under rocks or stones in the water and among vegetation, or by entering the burrows it digs. These burrows are dug in mud or clay and can be more than 50 cm deep. Part of the burrow is normally flooded.

== Food ==
The Maltese freshwater crab is carnivorous and feeds on other smaller animals such as tadpoles. It usually feeds after sunset.

== Population ==
The numbers of this freshwater crab are steadily declining as a result of pollution of water, drying up of streams and because of its capture by humans.

== See also ==
- Endemic Maltese wildlife
