= Triq il-Wiesgħa Tower =

- Torri ta' Triq il-Wiesgħa
- Part of the De Redin towers
- Żabbar, Malta
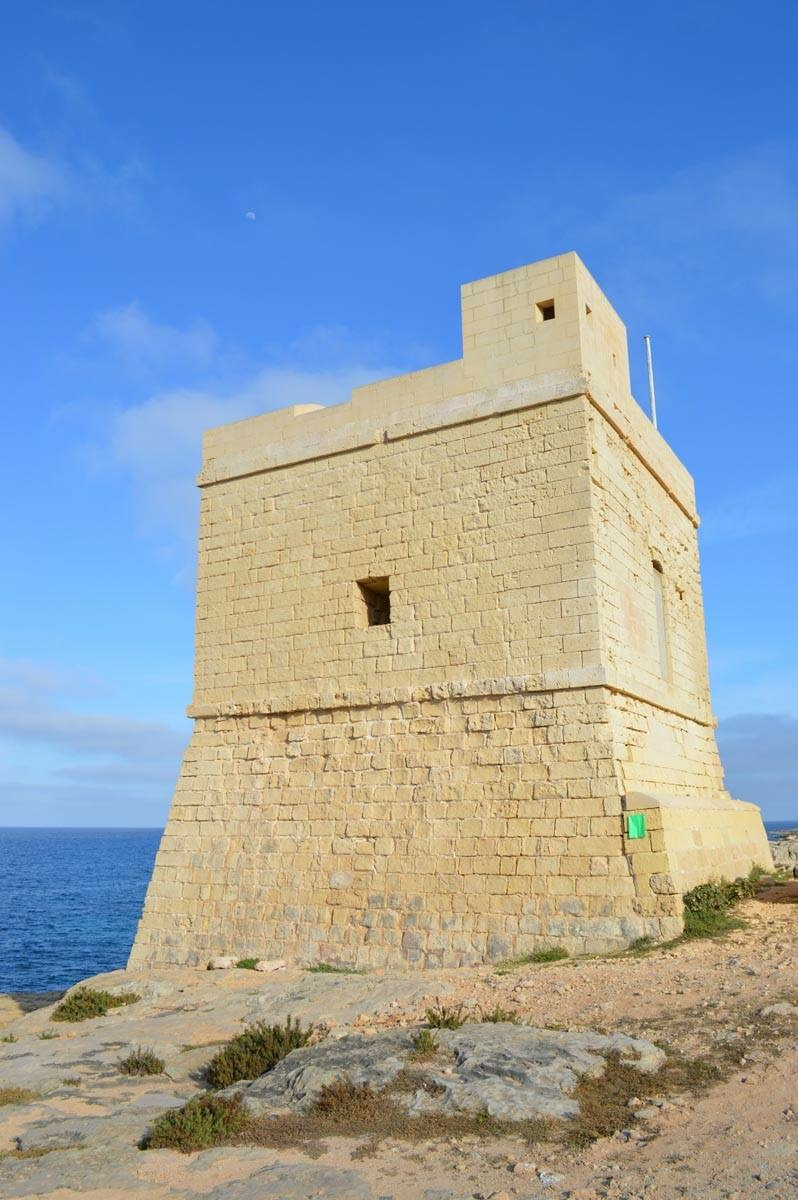
- Triq il-Wiesgħa Tower

Site information
- Type: Coastal watchtower
- Owner: Government of Malta
- Controlled by: Fondazzjoni Wirt Artna
- Open to the public: No
- Condition: Intact

Location
- Coordinates: 35°52′40.7″N 14°33′51.4″E

Site history
- Built: 1659
- Built by: Order of Saint John
- Materials: Limestone

Triq il-Wiesgħa Tower (Maltese: Torri ta' Triq il-Wiesgħa), originally known as Torre della Giddida and also called Mwejġel Tower (Maltese: Torri ta' Mwejġel or Torri tal-Imwiegħel), is a small watchtower near Żabbar, Malta. It was built in 1659 as the ninth of the thirteen De Redin towers. The tower suffered extensive damage in the 20th century, with parts of the structure being demolished, but it was restored in 2008 and 2009 and is now in good condition.

== History ==
Triq il-Wiesgħa Tower was built in 1659 on the shore east of the Grand Harbour. Its name means "Wide Street", because of the wide stretch of coastline it had to defend. It follows the standard design of the De Redin towers, having a square plan with two floors and a turret on the roof. Triq il-Wiesgħa Tower had Santa Maria delle Grazie Tower in its line of sight to the west, and Żonqor Tower to the east, but these no longer exist as they were both demolished by the British military.

In the 1870s, Fort Leonardo was built about 350 m (1,150 ft) away from the tower. The fort was on high ground and Triq il-Wiesgħa Tower did not fall in its line of fire. Had the tower fell within the line of fire, it would have most probably been demolished, as was done in other cases such as Delimara Tower and Bengħisa Tower, which were demolished to clear the lines of fire of Fort Delimara and Fort Benghisa respectively.

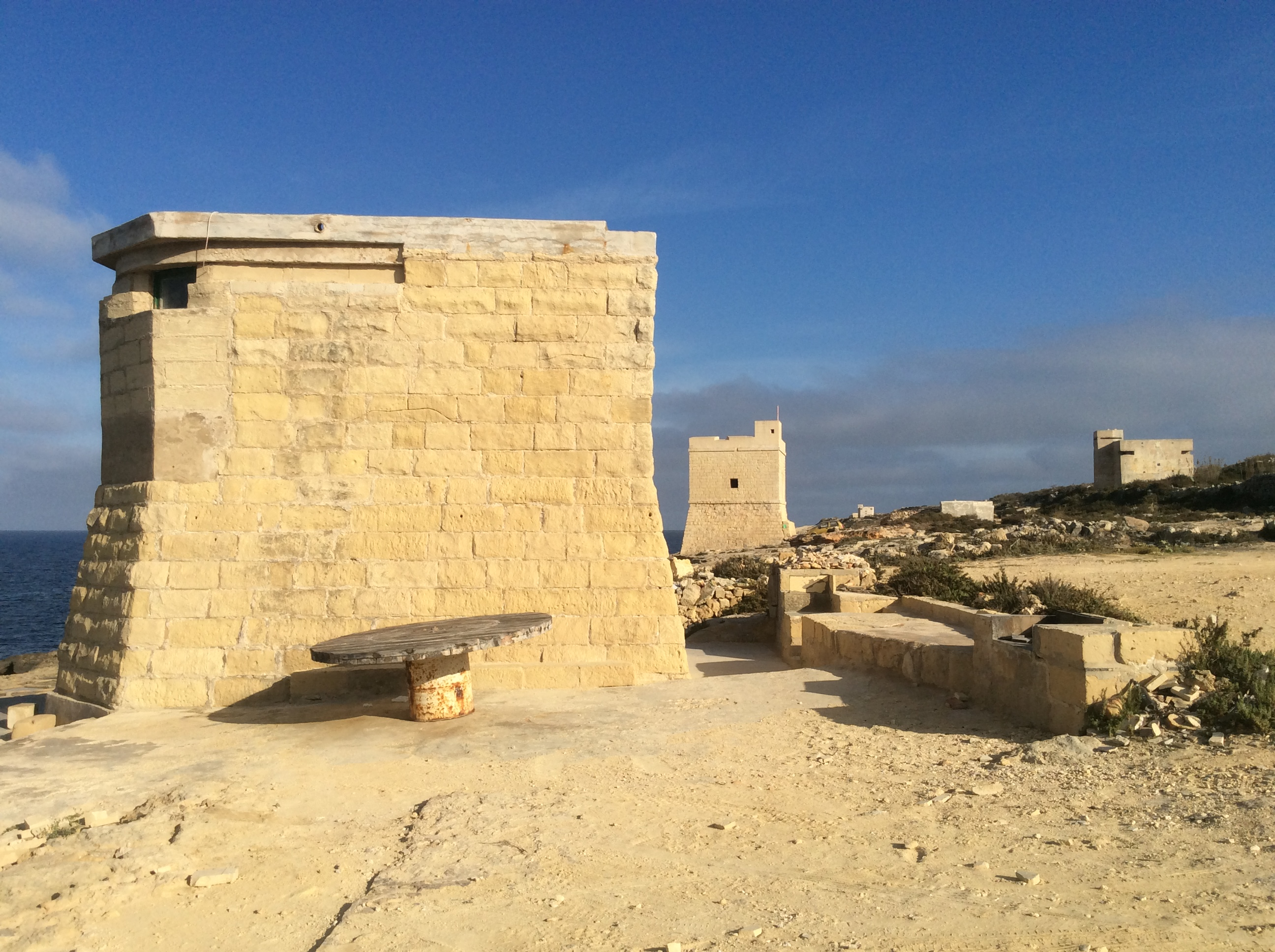
World War II-era pillboxes near the tower

By the early 20th century, the rear part of the tower had collapsed and the tower was in ruins, but it was restored in the 1930s. The tower's parapet and turret were removed in World War II, and pillboxes were built in its vicinity. The tower was further damaged when an aircraft crashed nearby.

== Present day ==
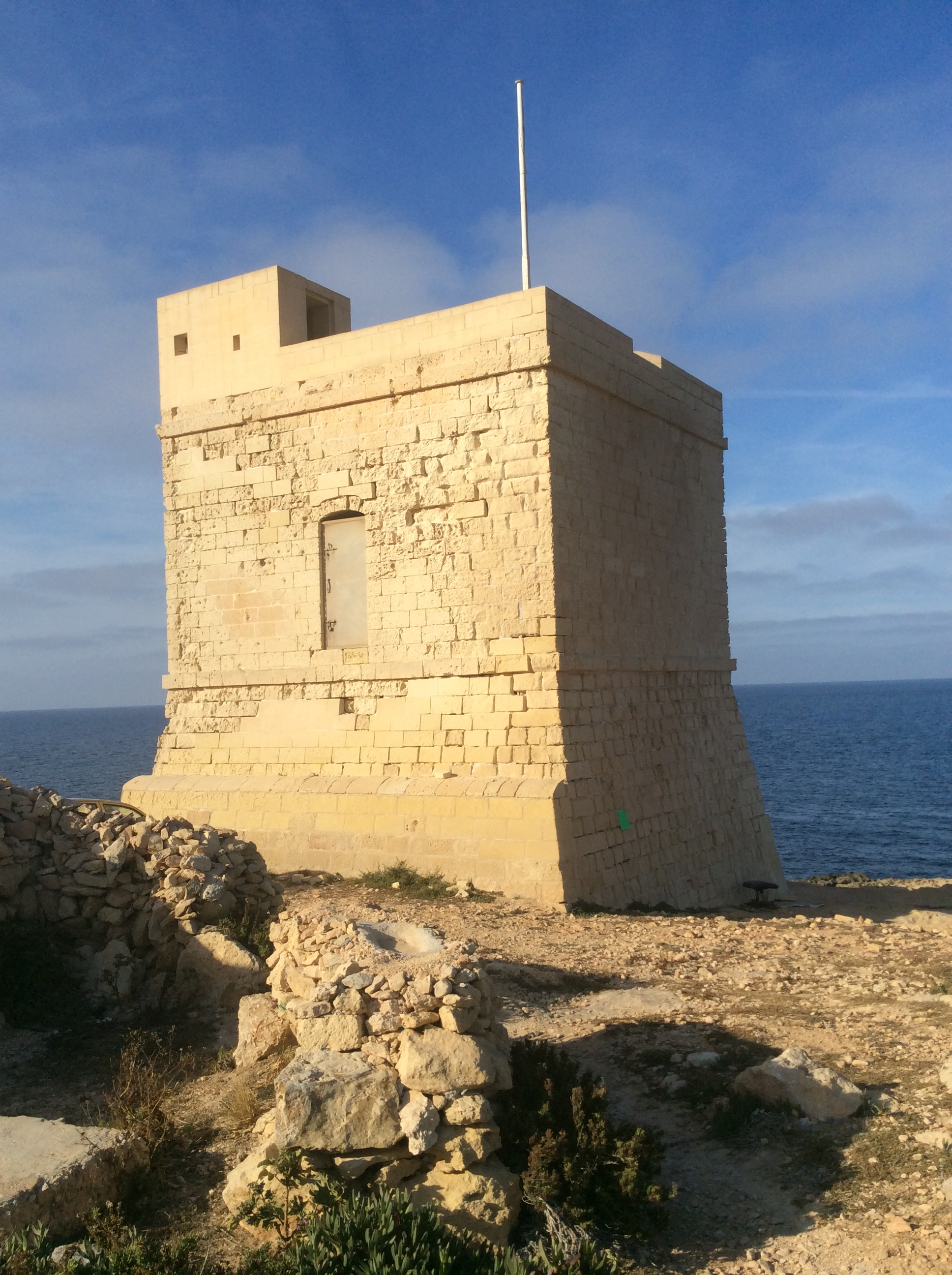
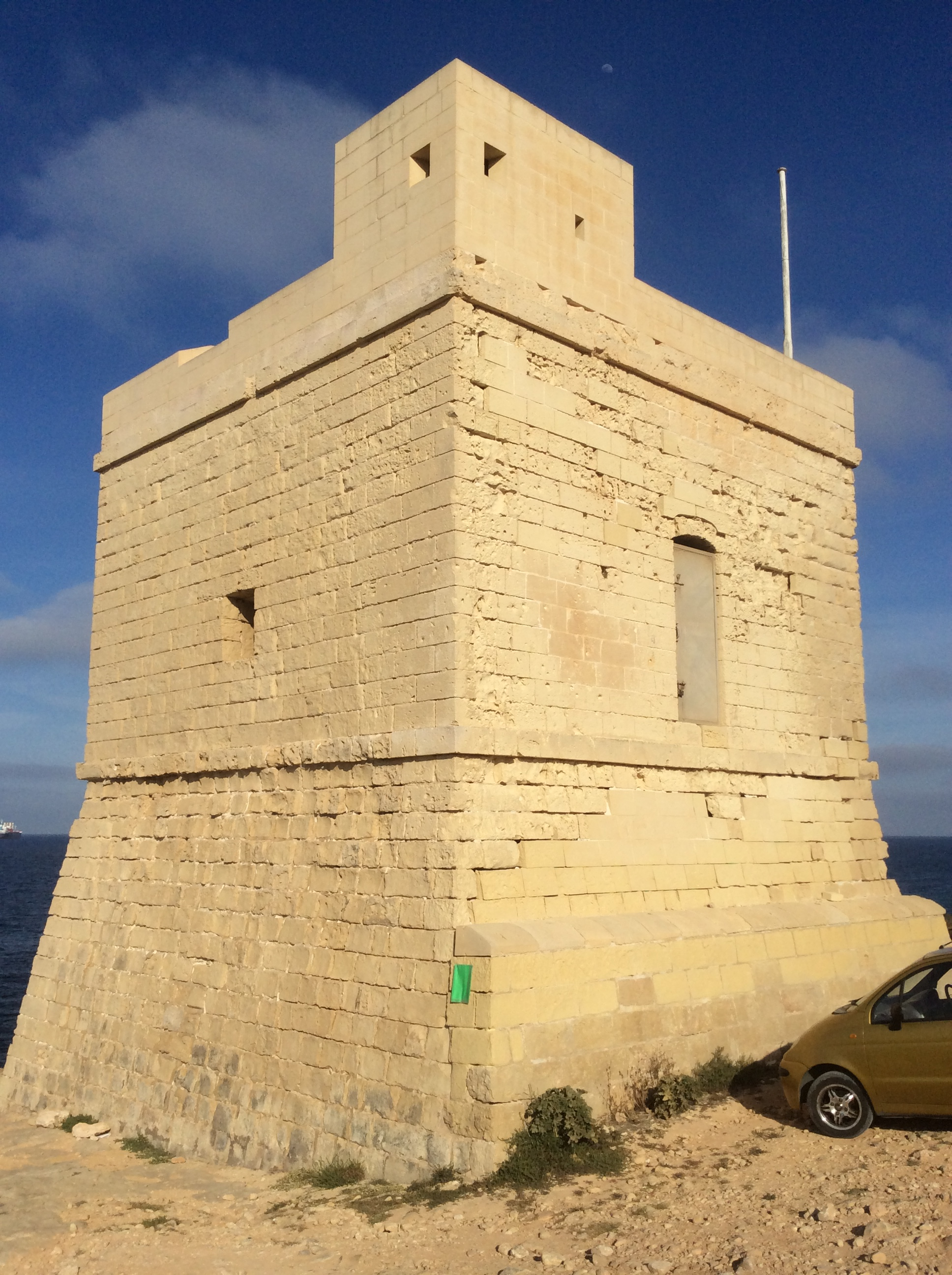
Two views of the tower after restoration

After the war, the tower fell again into a state of disrepair, with part of its foundations having collapsed. In 2004, it was handed to Fondazzjoni Wirt Artna. Restoration began four years later in September 2008, and was complete by March 2009. During the restoration, the features removed during World War II were also rebuilt.
