= Għajn Ħadid Tower =

- Torri ta' Għajn Ħadid
- Part of the De Redin towers
- Mellieħa, Malta
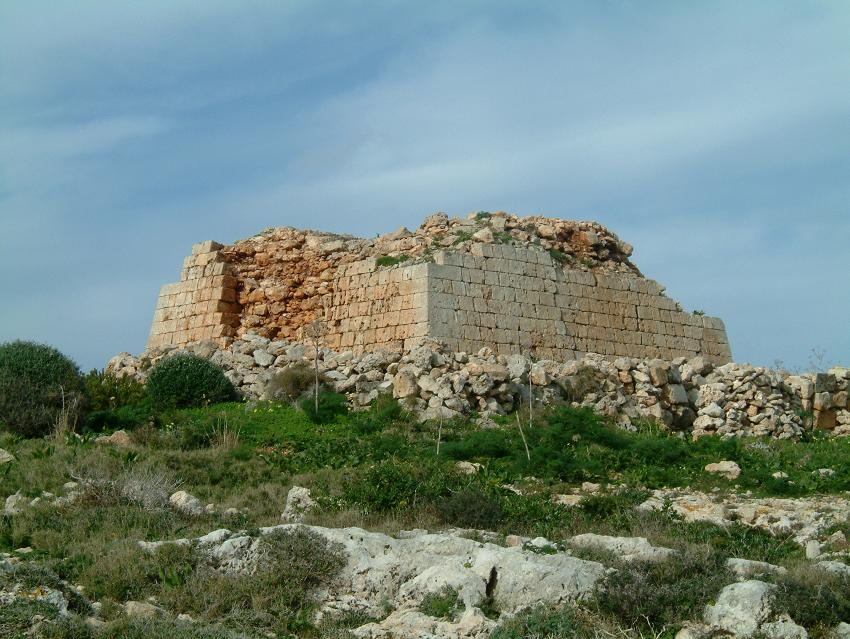
- Ruins of Għajn Ħadid Tower

Site information
- Type: Coastal watchtower
- Owner: Government of Malta
- Condition: Ruins

Location
- Coordinates: 35°58′4.1″N 14°23′6″E

Site history
- Built: 1658
- Built by: Order of Saint John
- Materials: Limestone
- Fate: Collapsed, 1856

Għajn Ħadid Tower (Maltese: Torri ta' Għajn Ħadid), originally known as Torre di Salomone and known by locals as Xagħra Tower (Maltese: It-Torri tax-Xagħra), is a ruined watchtower in Selmun, limits of Mellieħa, Malta. It was built in 1658 as the first of the De Redin towers. The tower has been in ruins since its upper floor collapsed in an earthquake in 1856.

== History ==
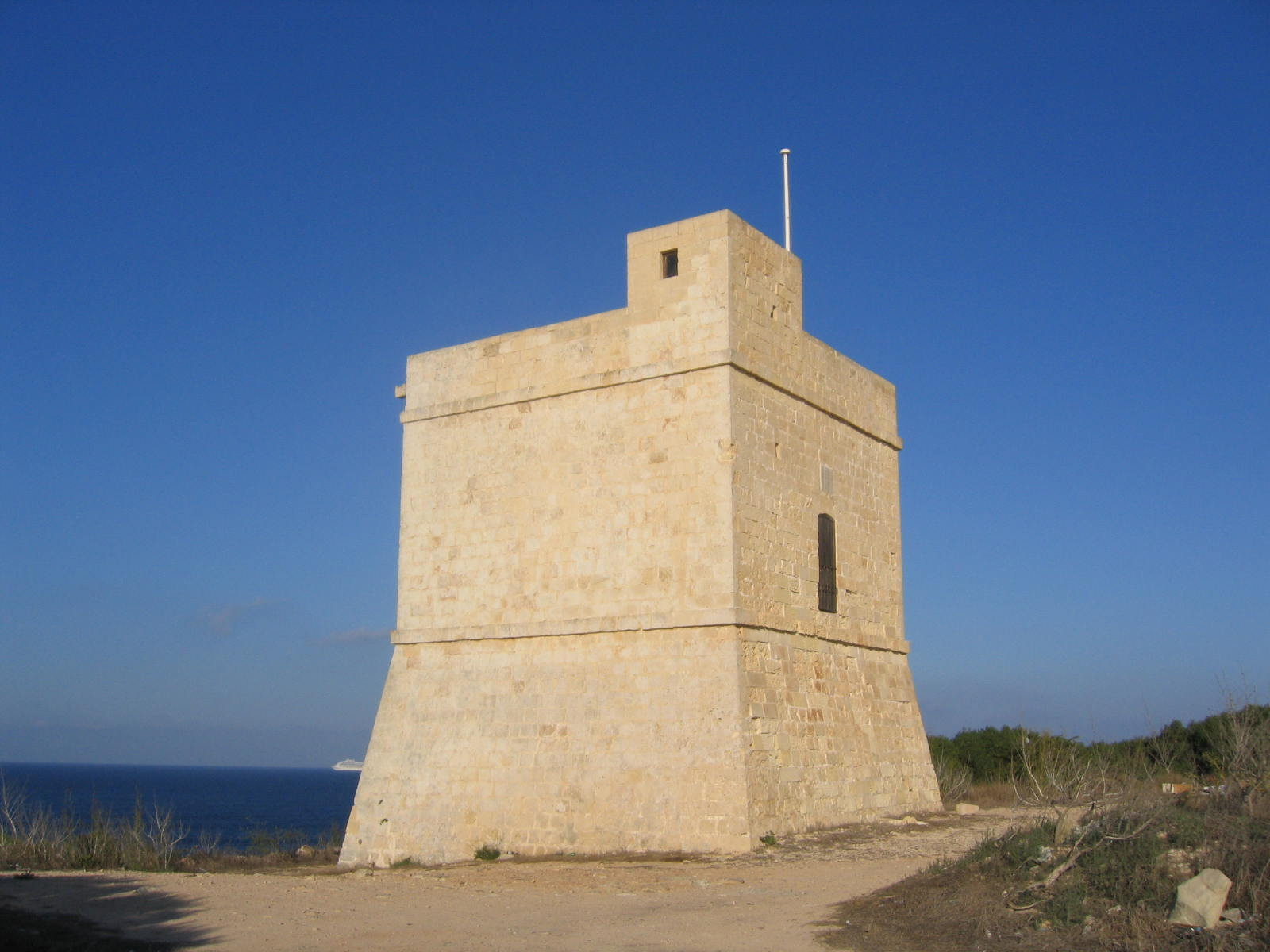
View of Għallis Tower, showing what Għajn Ħadid Tower looked like before its collapse in 1843

Għajn Ħadid Tower was the first De Redin tower to be built, between March and May 1658. The total cost of construction was 529 scudi, 2 tari and 8 uqija. It was built on a cliff face overlooking Mġiebaħ Bay, having views of l-Aħrax tal-Mellieħa, Comino, Gozo, St. Paul's Bay and Baħar iċ-Ċagħaq.

The design of the tower was based on the Sciuta Tower, which had been built in 1638 in Wied iż-Żurrieq. It had a square plan with two floors and a turret on the roof, with the entrance being a doorway located on the first floor, that could only be reached by a retractable ladder. The design continued to be used for all the other De Redin towers in Malta.

According to a 1743 report in which all coastal towers were inspected due to the fear of a plague, the tower was armed with two bronze cannons, gun wheels and stock, eighteen cannonballs, fifteen rotolos of gunpowder, four muskets and twelve rotolos of musket balls. It was manned by six people.

The area around the tower contains a number of fields with rubble walls that were used to grow crops and house animals. A well dug into solid rock is also found a couple of metres away from the tower. Both the fields and the well were probably used by the militia stationed in the tower since the tower was in a remote location and was difficult to supply. The tower was therefore self-sufficient. A small defensible room pierced by musketry loopholes is located nearby, but it is not known if this predates the tower or if it was built after it. The remains of a small sentry room can also be seen in the area. All these features are unique to Għajn Ħadid Tower.

== Collapse ==
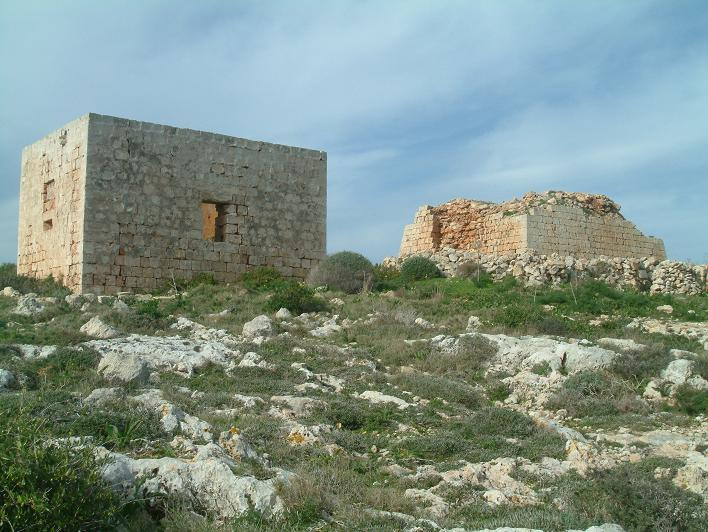
The ruined tower and the nearby defensible room

Għajn Ħadid Tower was severely damaged in an earthquake on 12 October 1856, when its upper floor collapsed. Most of the stones were then removed to be used in other buildings, but part of the scarped base still exists. The defensible room near the tower survived the earthquake, and still exists today. Despite the tower's collapse, its ruins are still important as they clearly show elements of the tower's architecture which are not normally visible in the still standing towers. Since the other De Redin towers are almost identical, more information about their construction can be found by studying Għajn Ħadid Tower.

The commemorative plaque that was originally on the tower is on public display at a garden in Tas-Salib Square in Mellieħa. The tower's 6-pound cannon was retrieved in 1975 by the Historical Society of Mellieħa, and it is now displayed along with the plaque at the same garden.

On the plaque it is written:

FR. D. MARTINVS DE REDIN MAGNO S. R. H. MAGISTRO

SEXTAM SPEULAM. PRO GARINARVM. AC INCOLARVM TUTIORI
STATIONE, ERIGENTI, MELITEN S. POPVLVS PRINCIPI SVO CLEMENT
PRO. VT IN CORDE. SIC IN L…RIDE GRATES
DEBITAS REDDEBAT AN. 1658.
