= Ħamrija Tower =

Watchtower in Qrendi, Malta

- Torri tal-Ħamrija
- Part of the De Redin towers
- Qrendi, Malta
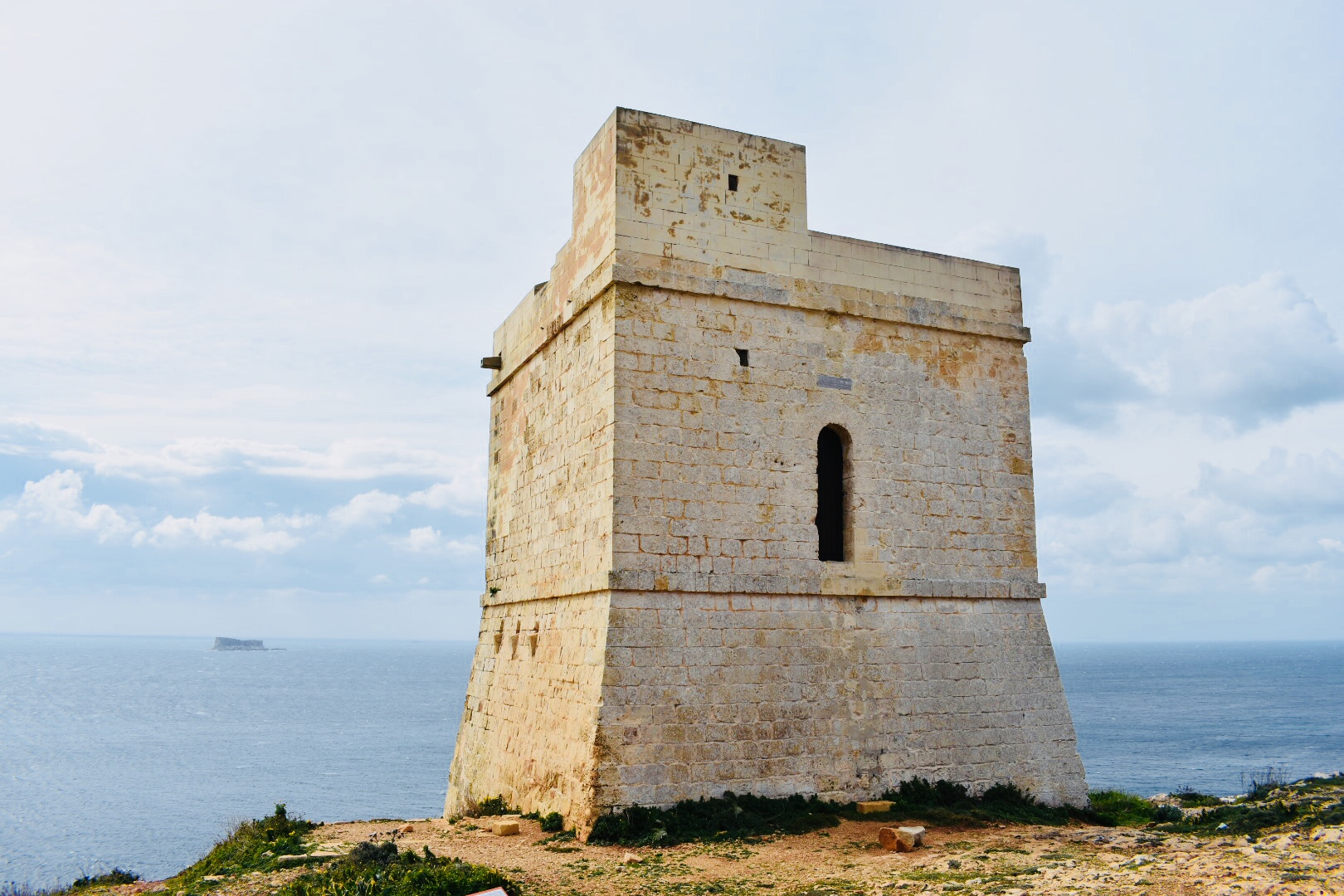
- Ħamrija Tower with Filfla in the background

Site information
- Type: Coastal watchtower
- Owner: Government of Malta
- Controlled by: Heritage Malta
- Condition: Intact

Location
- Coordinates: 35°49′28.2″N 14°26′23.8″E

Site history
- Built: 1659
- Built by: Order of Saint John
- Materials: Limestone

Ħamrija Tower (Maltese: Torri tal-Ħamrija), originally known as Torre della Pietra Nigra (Maltese: Torri tal-Ħaġra s-Sewda) and also known locally as Torri ta' Rsejjen, is a small watchtower in Qrendi, Malta. It was completed in 1659 as the twelfth of the De Redin towers. The tower was restored by Heritage Malta and it is now in good condition.

== History ==
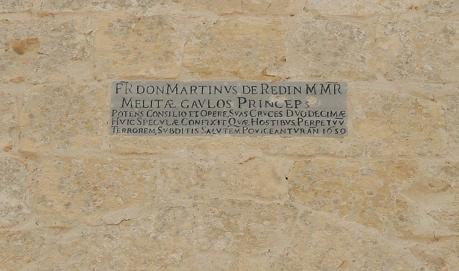
Plaque on the Ħamrija Tower

Ħamrija Tower was built in 1659 on a cliff on the southwestern coast of Malta, on the site of a medieval watch post. It is located between Għar Lapsi, which is part of Siġġiewi, and Wied iż-Żurrieq, which is part of Qrendi. From the tower, one can see Filfla. The tower is located a few hundred metres from two Neolithic temple sites, Mnajdra and Ħaġar Qim, although these had not yet been discovered when it was built.

The tower's structure is similar to the other De Redin towers, having a square base with two floors. The entrance is on the upper floor, which can be reached by a retractable ladder.

The nearest tower in the chain is the Sciutu Tower to the southeast. Ħamrija Tower is the last tower on the southwest coast, so it has no other towers in its line of sight. It was originally armed with a 3-pounder gun and a ½-pounder gun, which were mainly used to signal to the other towers.

== Present day ==
The tower was recently restored and partially rebuilt after parts of its external revetments collapsed. These works involved the reconstruction of the spiral staircase, along with the shaft and parapet. It now forms part of the Ħaġar Qim and Mnajdra Archaeological Park, which includes the temples, the tower, a memorial to Sir Walter Congreve, a visitor centre and the surrounding area.
