= Delimara Tower =

Tower in Malta

Delimara Tower & Battery
- Torri u Batterija ta' Delimara
- Part of the De Redin towers
- Marsaxlokk, Malta
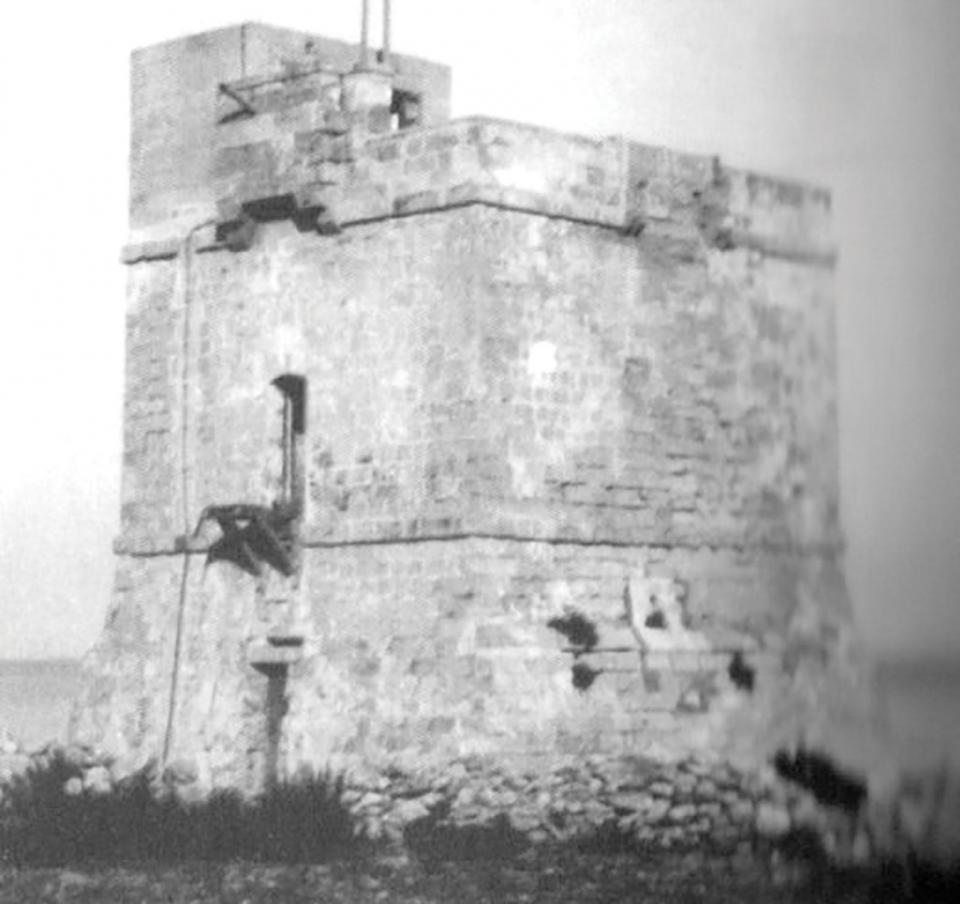

Site information
- Type: Coastal watchtower Artillery battery

Location
- Coordinates: 35°49′13.5″N 14°33′39.5″E

Site history
- Built: 1659 (tower); 1793 (battery)
- Built by: Order of Saint John
- Materials: Limestone
- Fate: Demolished

Delimara Tower (Maltese: Torri ta' Delimara), originally known as Torre della Limara, was a small watchtower on the Delimara Peninsula, in the limits of Marsaxlokk, Malta. It was built in 1659 as the tenth De Redin tower, and an artillery battery was later built nearby in 1793. Both the tower and the battery have been demolished.

== History ==
Delimara Tower was built in 1659 at the tip of Delimara Point. It followed the standard design of the De Redin towers, having a square plan with two floors and a turret on the roof. A feature unique to Delimara Tower was that it had machicolations. It also had a buttress at the base, implying that it had some structural weaknesses. A similar buttress still exists at Triq il-Wiesgħa Tower.

Each De Redin tower had two neighbouring towers in its line of sight, so that signals could be sent from one tower to another, in order to maintain a communication link. Delimara Tower had Xrobb l-Għaġin Tower in its line of sight to the northeast, and Bengħisa Tower to the southwest. A mortar battery was built near the tower in 1793.

Both the tower and battery were demolished by the British to clear the line of fire of the nearby Fort Delimara.
