= Saint Mark's Tower =

Watchtower in Baħar iċ-Ċagħaq, Malta

- Torri ta' Qalet Marku
- Part of the De Redin towers
- Baħar iċ-Ċagħaq, Naxxar, Malta
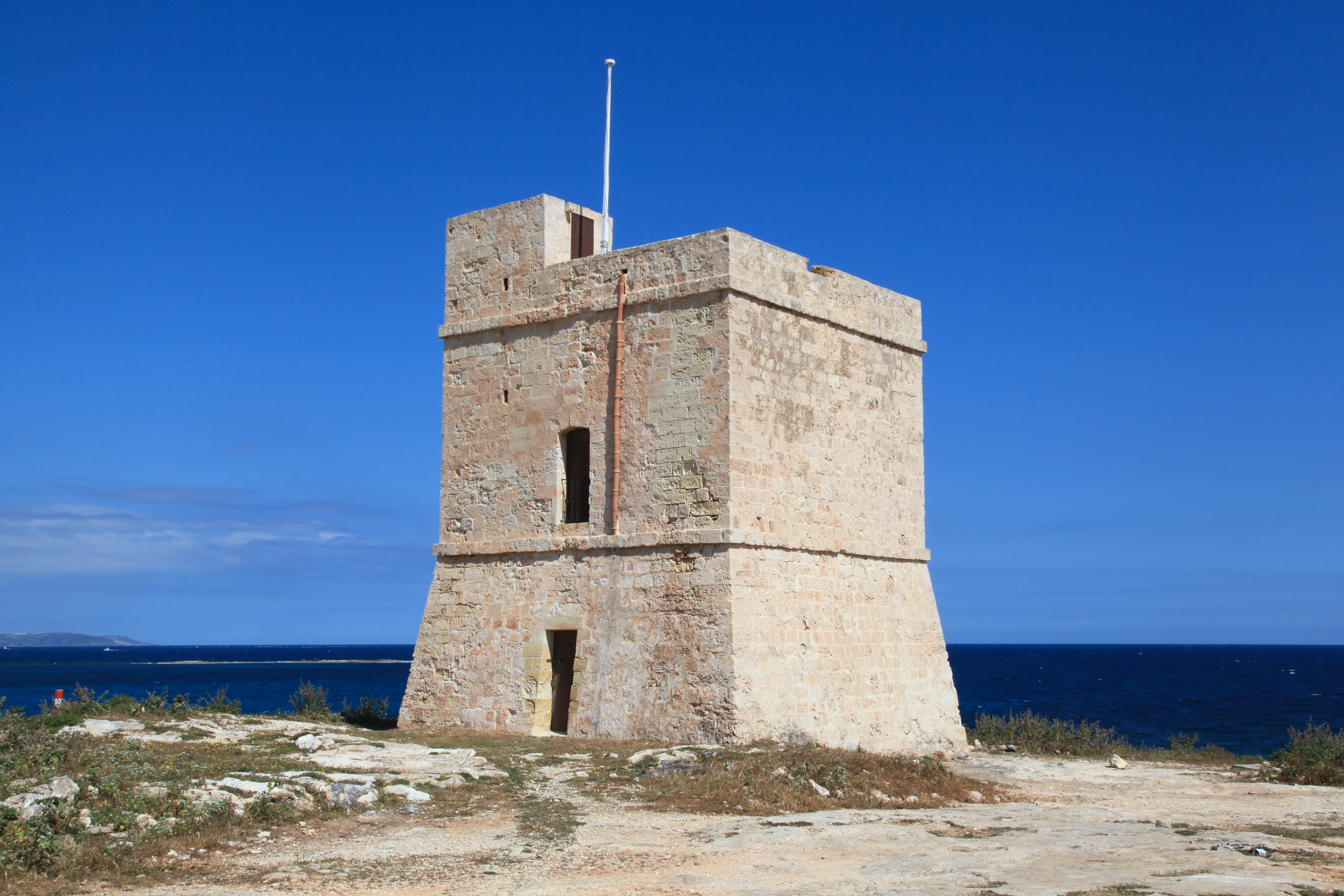
- Saint Mark's Tower viewed from the south

Site information
- Type: Coastal watchtower
- Owner: Government of Malta
- Controlled by: Din l-Art Ħelwa
- Open to the public: Yes (by appointment)
- Condition: Intact

Location
- Coordinates: 35°56′47.3″N 14°27′12″E

Site history
- Built: 1658
- Built by: Order of Saint John
- Materials: Limestone

Saint Mark's Tower (Maltese: Torri ta' San Mark), originally known as Torre del Cortin and also known as Qalet Marku Tower (Maltese: Torri ta' Qalet Marku), is a small watchtower in Baħar iċ-Ċagħaq, limits of Naxxar, Malta. It was completed in 1658 as the third of the De Redin towers. Today, the tower is in good condition.

== History ==
Saint Mark's Tower was built in 1658 on Qrejten Point in Baħar iċ-Ċagħaq, on the north shore of Malta. It was built on or near the site of a medieval watch post. It has sight of Għallis Tower to the west, and Madliena Tower to the east. Construction of the tower cost 408 scudi. The tower follows the standard design of the De Redin towers, having a square plan with two floors and a turret on the roof.

In 1741, a fougasse was built close to the tower, and it was believed to have been lost until it was rediscovered during road works in the area in 2014.

The tower was no longer operational by 1743, however in 1792 the Congregation of War ordered that the tower be rearmed with a 3-pounder iron gun. The British built a small guard room in front of the tower, but this is now in ruins.

== Present day ==
Saint Mark's Tower is managed by Din l-Art Ħelwa, who restored it in 1997. The tower is in good condition, but the area around it has been criticized for the amount of litter left there, mainly by people camping on the peninsula.

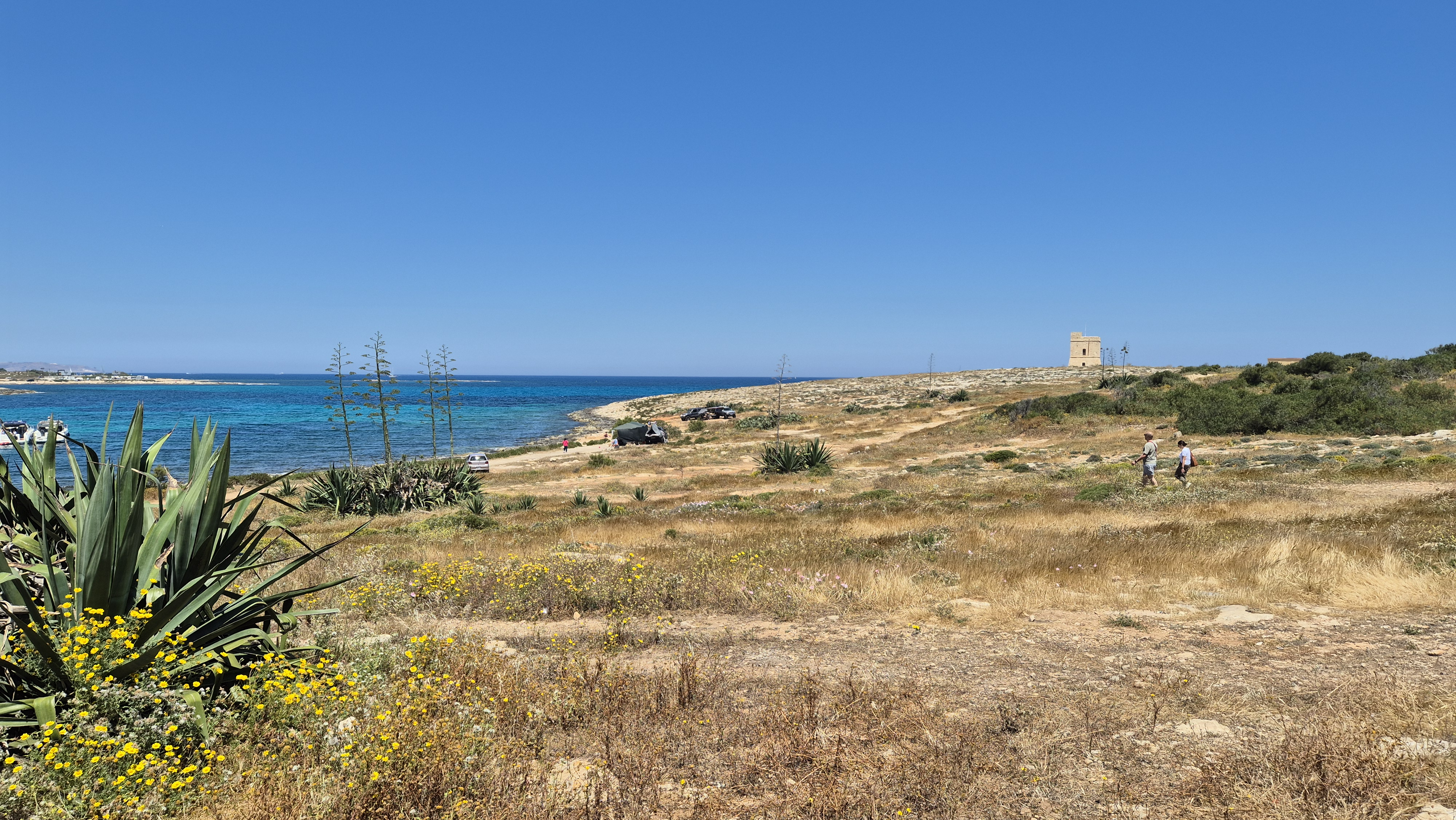
St Mark's Tower, Qalet Marku

The tower is open to the public by appointment.
