= Wardija Tower =

- Torri tal-Wardija
- Part of the De Redin towers
- Żurrieq, Malta
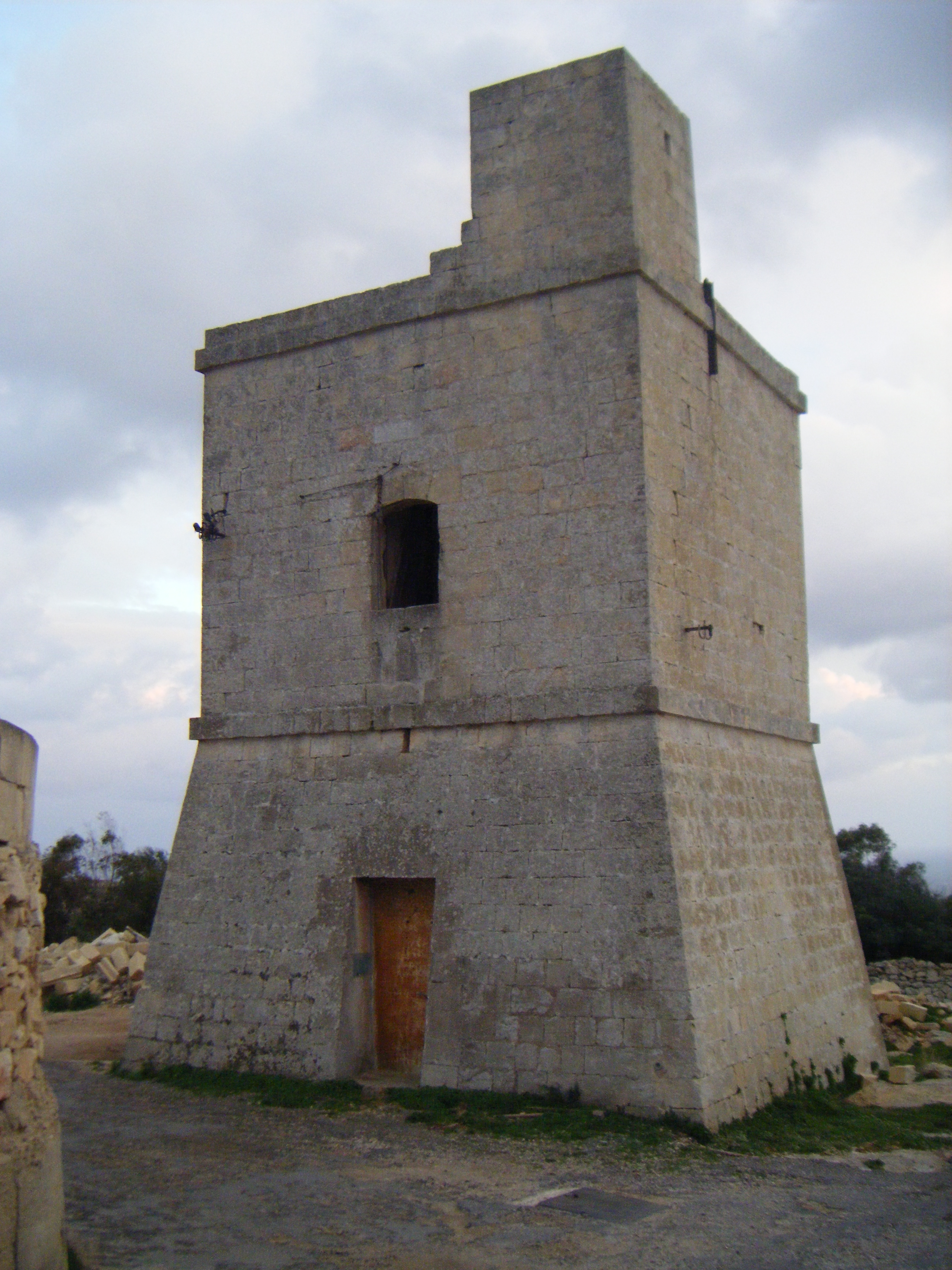
- Wardija Tower prior to restoration, viewed from the north

Site information
- Type: Coastal watchtower
- Owner: Government of Malta
- Controlled by: Private tenant
- Open to the public: No
- Condition: Intact

Location
- Coordinates: 35°49′9.5″N 14°28′23.2″E

Site history
- Built by: Order of Saint John
- Materials: Limestone

Wardija Tower (Maltese: Torri tal-Wardija), originally known as Torre della Guardia di Giorno and also known as Bubaqra Tower (Maltese: Torri ta' Bubaqra), is a small watchtower in the limits of Żurrieq, Malta. It was completed in June 1659 as the last of the thirteen De Redin towers.

Wardija Tower was the last coastal watchtower to be built on the main island of Malta. It is situated between Żurrieq and Ħal Far, with the nearest tower to it being Sciuta Tower to the west. The tower follows the standard design of the De Redin towers, having a square plan with two floors and a turret on the roof, but it is slightly smaller. It was originally armed with 2 cannons and 2 mortars.

After the British period, the tower became abandoned and fell into disuse. In June 2022, the tower was restored by the Restoration Directorate, a scheme set up by the Żurrieq Local Council in order to carry out restoration projects on various sites in Żurrieq.

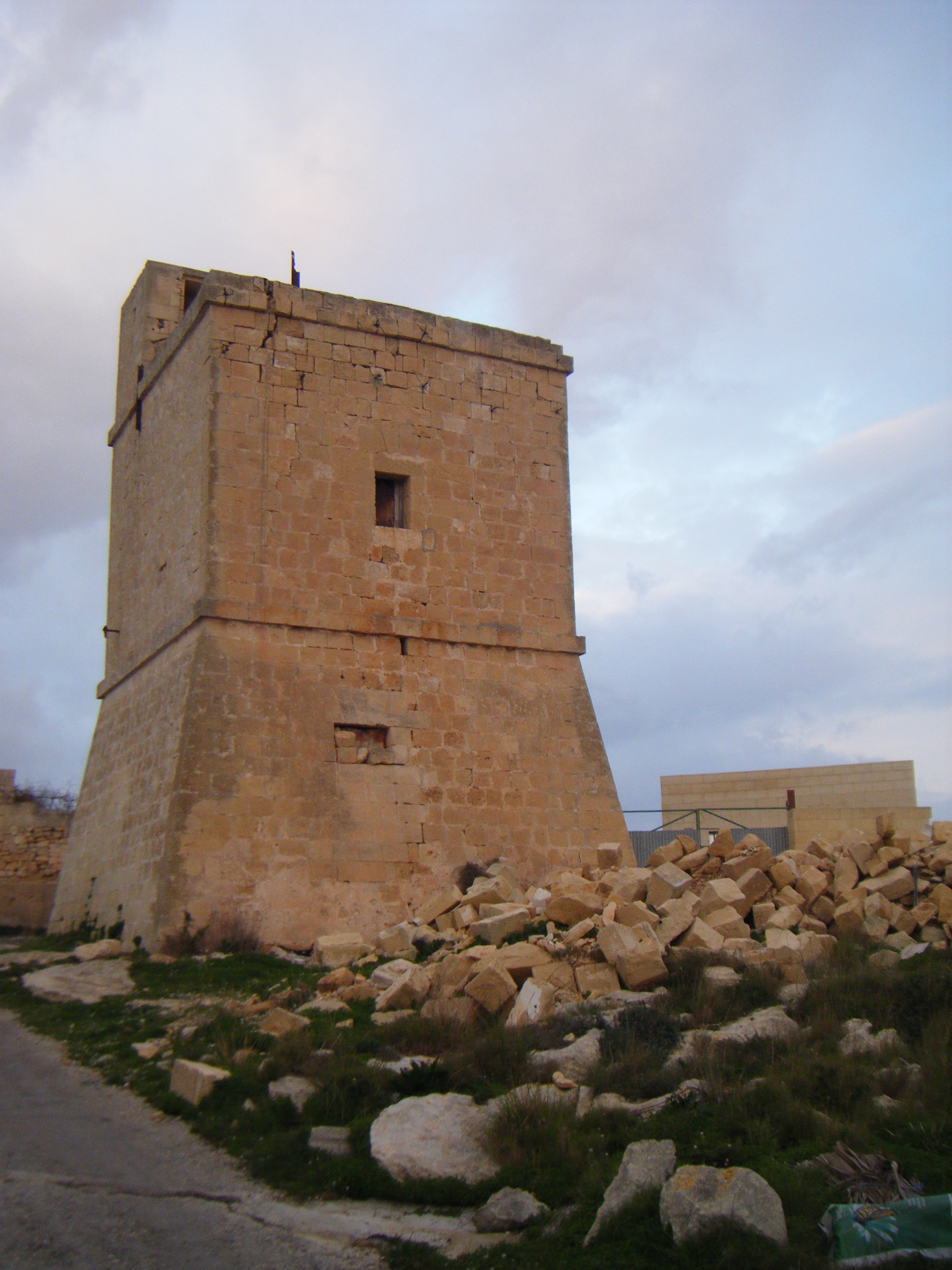
Wardija Tower viewed from the south
