= Saint Julian's Tower =

Tower in Malta

Saint Julian's Tower & Battery
- Torri u Batterija ta' San Ġiljan
- Part of the De Redin towers
- Sliema, Malta
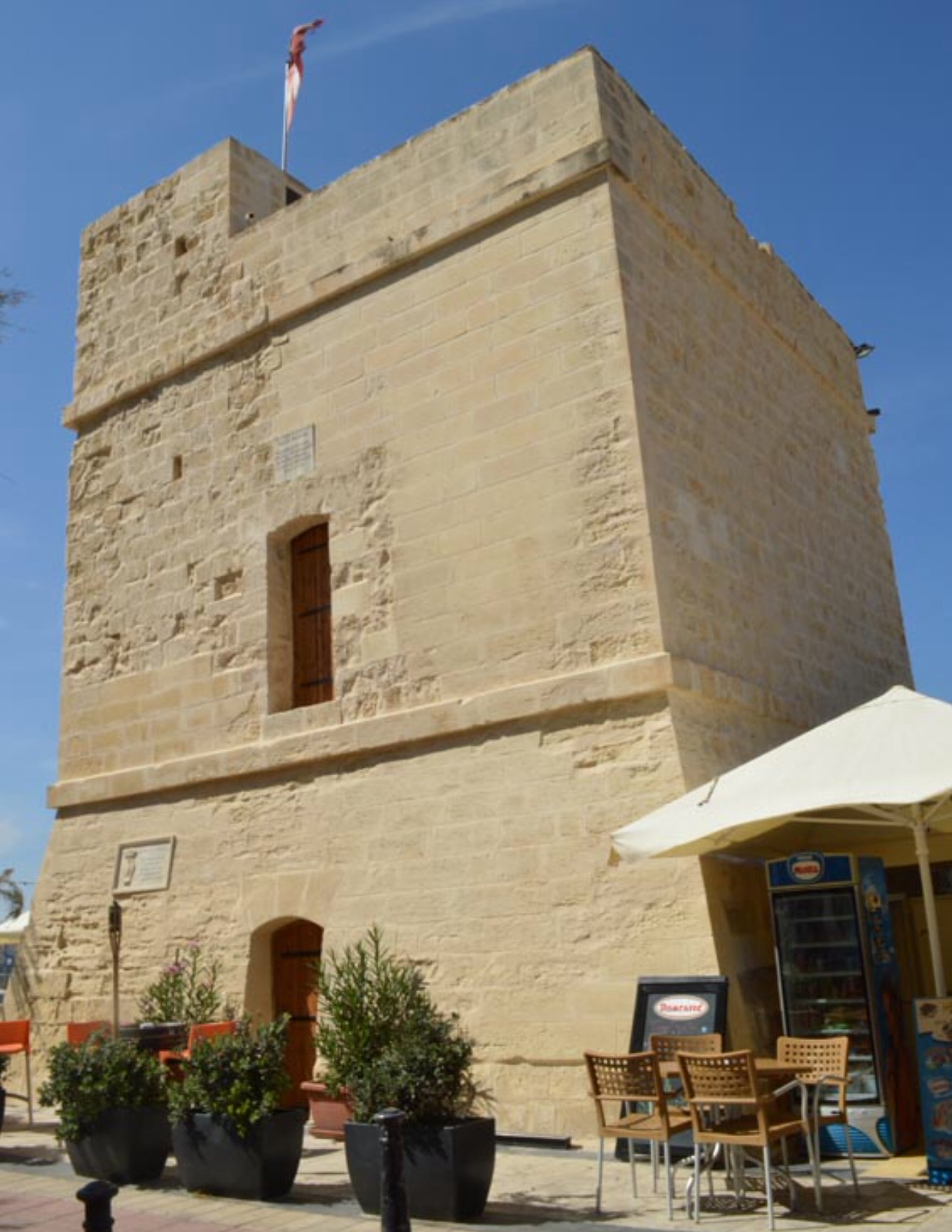
- Saint Julian's Tower

Site information
- Type: Coastal watchtower Artillery battery
- Owner: Government of Malta
- Controlled by: It-Torri Restaurant
- Open to the public: Yes (as a restaurant)
- Condition: Tower intact Battery partly intact
- Website: ittorri.com

Location
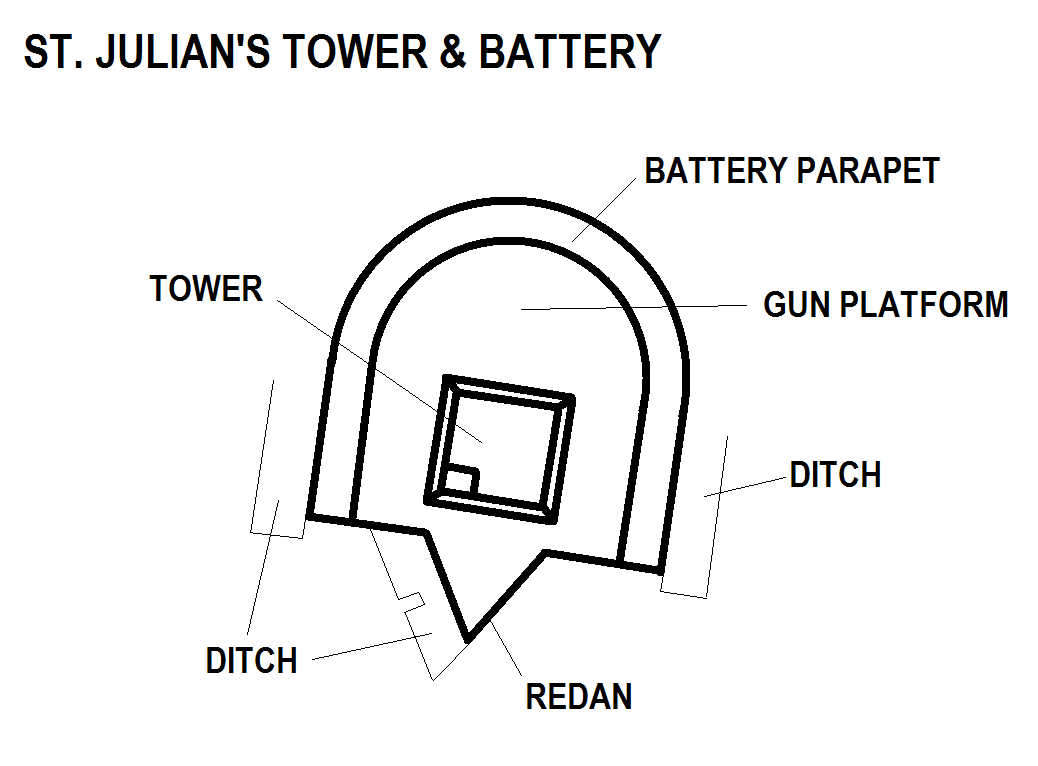
- Map of St. Julian's Tower & Battery before most of the battery was dismantled
- Coordinates: 35°55′4.1″N 14°29′57.1″E

Site history
- Built: 1658 (tower); 1715 (battery)
- Built by: Order of Saint John
- Materials: Limestone
- Battles/wars: Siege of Malta (1798–1800)

Saint Julian's Tower (Maltese: Torri ta' San Ġiljan), originally known as Torre di San Giuliano and also known as Sliema Tower (Maltese: Torri tas-Sliema), is a small watchtower in Sliema, Malta. It was completed in 1658 as the fifth of the 13 De Redin towers. An artillery battery was built around the tower in 1715. Today, the tower and the remains of the battery are a restaurant.

== History ==
Saint Julian's Tower was built in 1658 to protect St. Julian's Bay. It follows the standard design of the De Redin towers, having a square plan with two floors and a turret on the roof. It has Saint George's Tower in its line of sight to the west, and the capital Valletta to its east.

In 1715, a semi-circular artillery battery was built around the seaward side of the tower. Part of the battery had a parapet with four embrasures, with the rest of the parapet being en barbette. A free standing wall and a redan pierced with musketry loopholes enclosed the tower's land front, which was also protected by a shallow rock hewn ditch.

In 1798, during the Maltese uprising against the French, insurgents led by Vincenzo Borg captured Saint Julian's Tower and Battery. Later on during the blockade, the battery's guns were transferred to other insurgent fortifications such as the Corradino Batteries, in order to bombard the French in Valletta.

The tower gave its name to Tower Road, today one of Malta's most popular seaside promenades. In 1951, the Government of Malta affixed a marble plaque on the tower with the coat-of-arms of the GrandMaster who built it.

== Present day ==
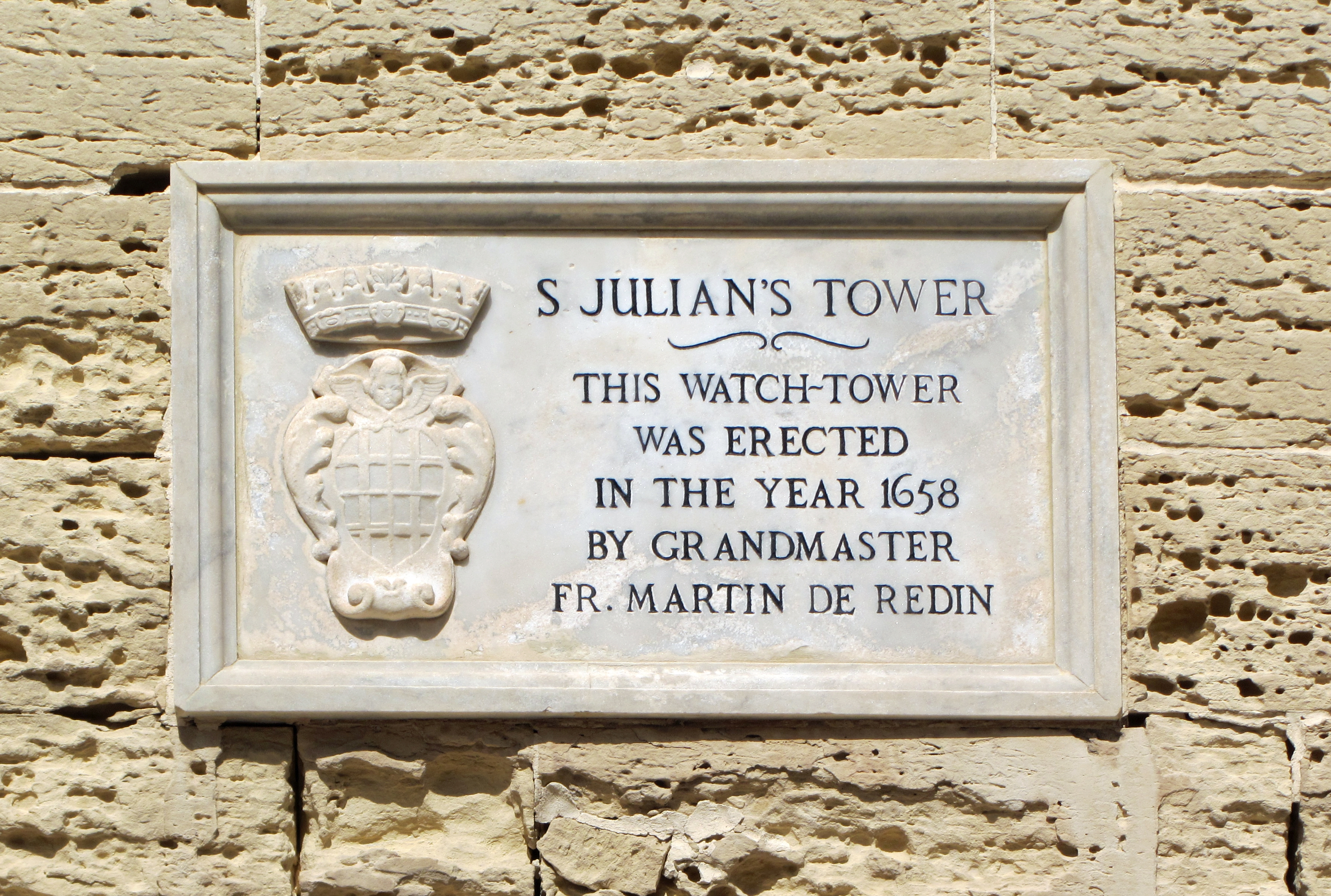
Plaque at St. Julian's Tower

Today, the tower is intact and in good condition. The battery is missing its land front and redan, which have been replaced by a promenade. In addition, the parapet with embrasures has been demolished and replaced by a low boundary wall.

The tower and battery are now used as a restaurant, known as It-Torri Restaurant.
