= De Redin towers =

Series of coastal watchtowers built on Malta in the 1650s

De Redin Towers
- Various locations in Malta and Gozo
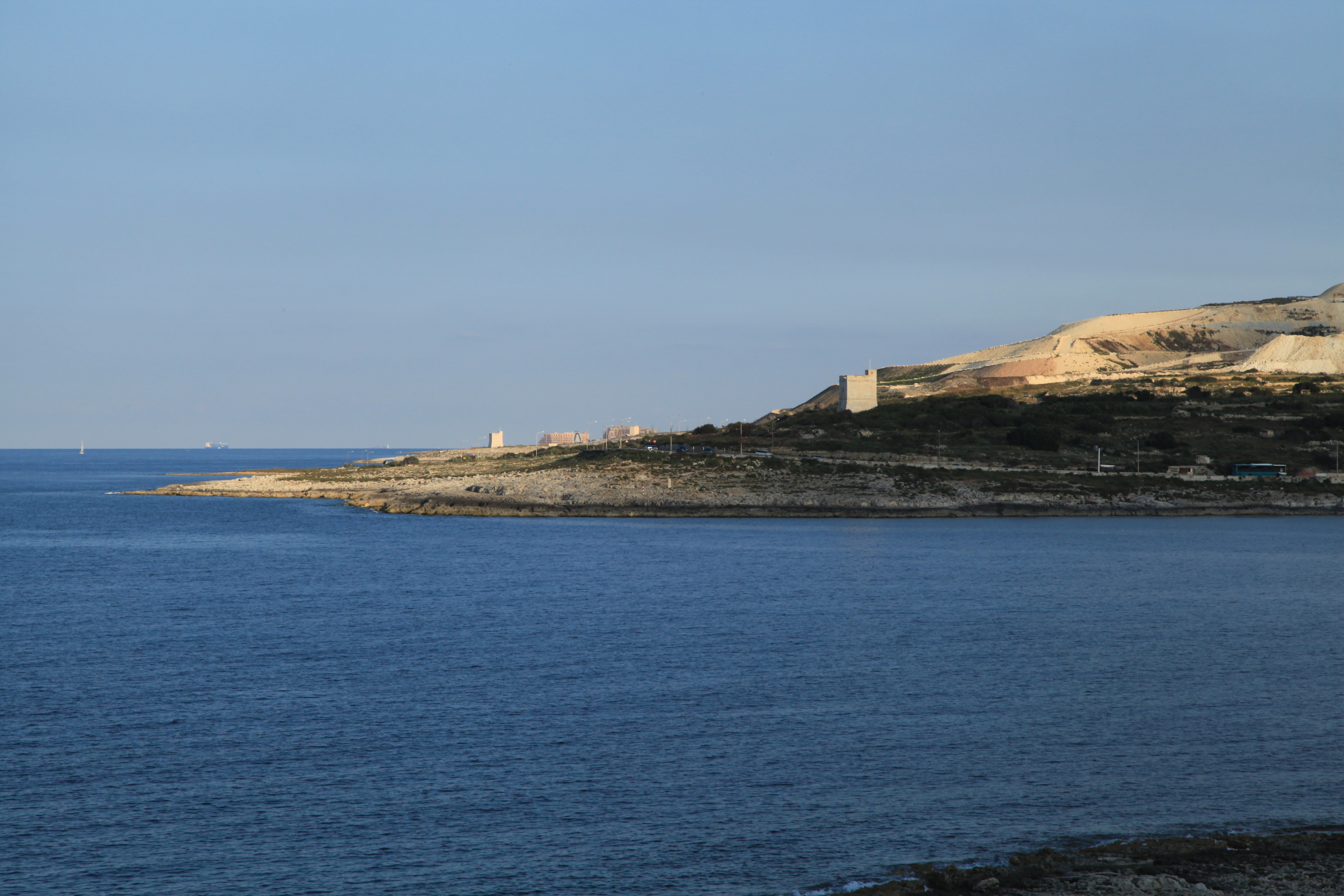
- View of Naxxar's coastline, with three De Redin towers visible (Għallis, St. Mark's and Madliena Towers)

Site information
- Type: Coastal watchtowers
- Condition: 8 intact 2 in ruins 3 destroyed

Site history
- Built: 1658–1659
- Built by: Order of Saint John
- In use: 1658–1940s
- Materials: Limestone
- Battles/wars: Siege of Malta (1798–1800); World War II

The De Redin Towers (Maltese: Torrijiet ta' De Redin) are a series of small coastal watchtowers built in Malta by the Order of Saint John between 1658 and 1659. Thirteen towers were built around the coast of mainland Malta to act as watchtowers. Eight of the towers still survive.

The Mġarr ix-Xini Tower, which was built on Gozo in 1661 after the death of de Redin, has a design similar to the De Redin towers.

== History ==
=== Background and construction ===
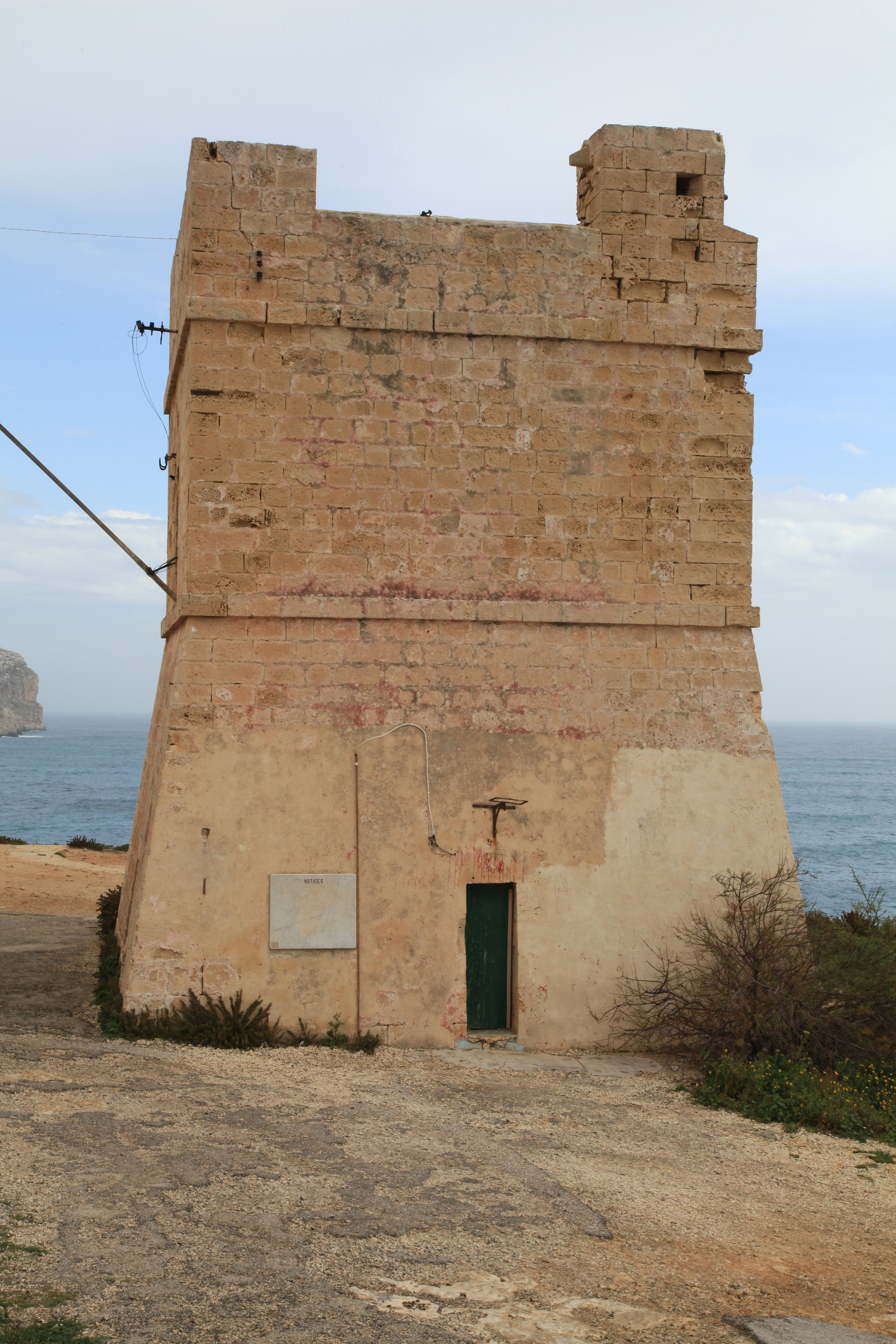
The De Redin towers are based on Sciuta Tower, which was built in 1638.

The Spanish knight Martin de Redin was elected Grand Master of the Order of St. John on 17 August 1657. In March 1658, he contributed 6428 scudi for the construction of 13 new watchtowers to strengthen the existing coastal defence system, which consisted mainly of the Wignacourt and Lascaris towers.

The design of the new towers was based on the Sciuta Tower, one of the Lascaris towers, which had been built in Wied iż-Żurrieq in 1638. Each tower had a square base with two floors, with a turret on the roof. The entrance was on the top floor, and was reached by a retractable ladder. The upper room was used as the living quarters for the garrison of four men, while the bottom room was used for storage. Two cannon were mounted on the roof of each tower.

Each tower also had two neighbouring towers in its line of sight, so that signals could be sent from one tower to another, in order to maintain a communication link between Gozo and the Grand Harbour. The signals consisted of smoke or cannon shots by day, or fire by night.

Construction of the first tower, located at Għajn Ħadid in Selmun, began in March 1658, and it was complete within two months. Twelve other towers were built within the following year, with the last tower being complete by July 1659.

In 1661, shortly after the death of de Redin, Mġarr ix-Xini Tower was built on the island of Gozo. Its design is very similar to the thirteen towers and it is sometimes considered to be one of the De Redin towers.

The De Redin towers were the last series of coastal watchtowers to be built in Malta. The only tower built after them was Isopu Tower, which was completed in 1667.

=== Eighteenth century ===
In around 1715, as part of a programme to improve Malta's coastal defences, Aħrax Tower and Saint Julian's Tower were upgraded into coastal batteries. A gun platform was built around the seaward face of the tower, which served as a blockhouse. Both batteries still survive, although they are either in a dilapidated state or extensively altered.

Fougasses were dug in the ground near some of the towers in the 1740s. Today, fougasses still exist near Madliena Tower and Saint Mark's Tower. In the 1760s, entrenchments were also built close to some towers, but many of these were demolished in the early 20th century. A small mortar battery was built close to Delimara Tower in 1793.

The De Redin towers did not play a role during the French capture of Malta in 1798, since by this time they were obsolete. However, St. Julian's Tower was involved in the subsequent Maltese uprising, when it was captured by Maltese insurgents.

=== British period ===
The upper floor of Għajn Ħadid Tower collapsed on 12 October 1856 during an earthquake, but the ruins of its base have survived to this day.

Most of the other towers were decommissioned in the 19th century. The only exception was Madliena Tower, which was modified to have a role similar to the Martello towers. A battery was built nearby in 1908, and it remained in use until World War II.

In the late 19th or early 20th centuries, the British demolished Bengħisa Tower, Delimara Tower and Żonqor Tower to clear the line of fire of new forts or batteries.

=== Conservation and restoration ===
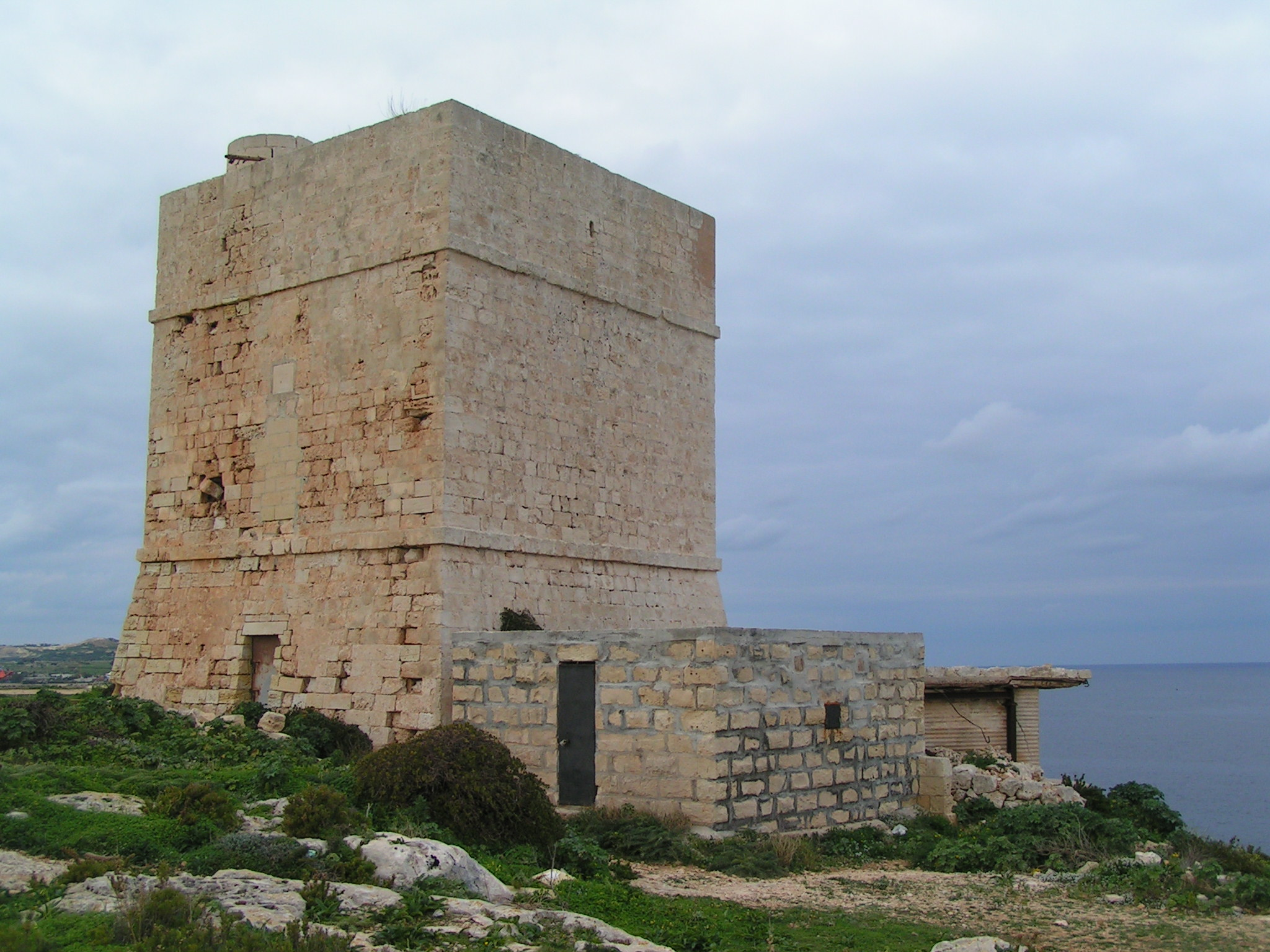
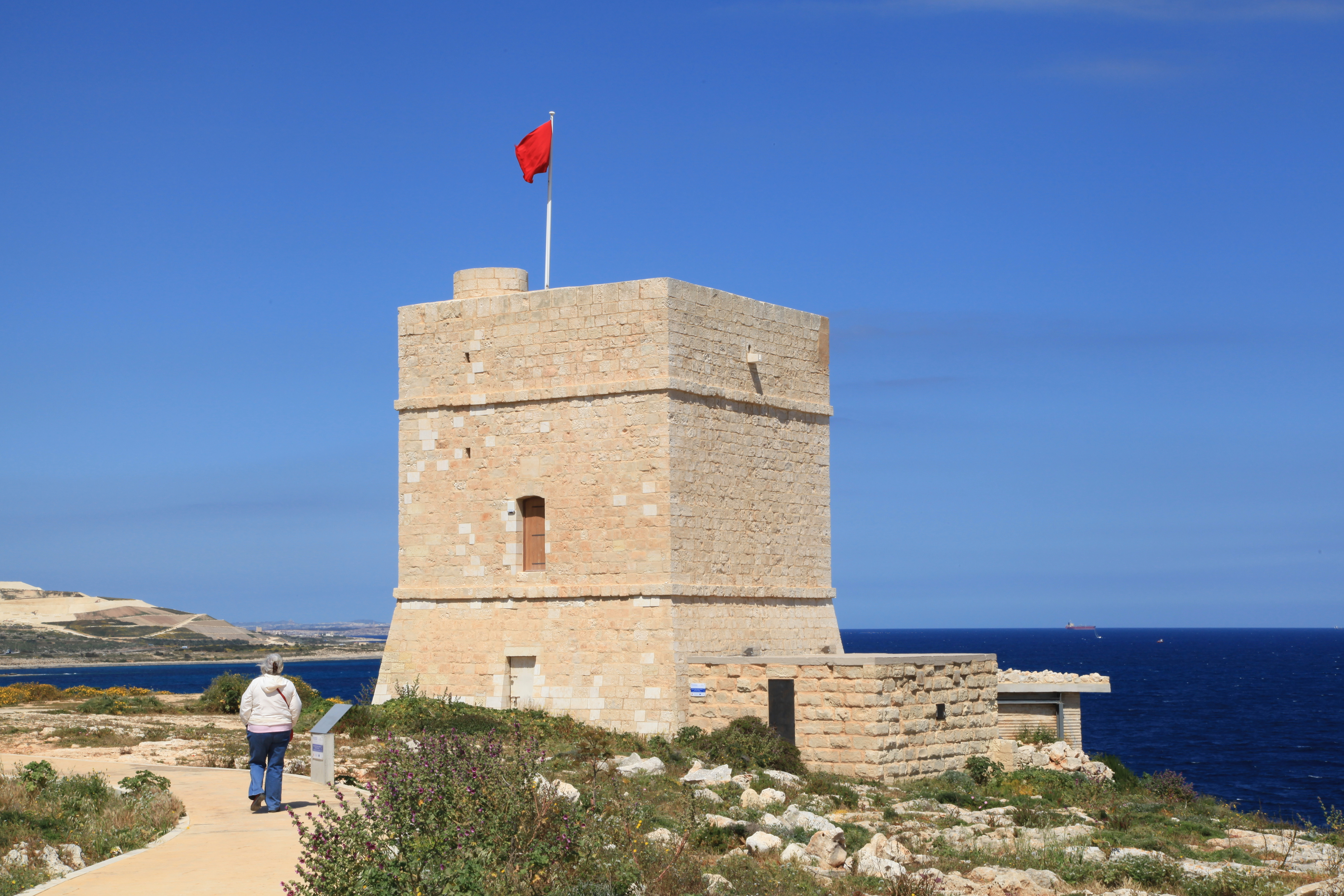
Madliena Tower in 2011 and 2014, before and after restoration

By the end of the 20th century, there were nine surviving De Redin towers. Most of these were intact but rather dilapidated. Triq il-Wiesgħa Tower and Ħamrija Tower were in a very bad state, and were in danger of collapsing.

The first restoration work was carried out by Din l-Art Ħelwa on Għallis Tower and Saint Mark's Tower between 1995 and 1997. Since 2008, Fondazzjoni Wirt Artna has restored Triq il-Wiesgħa Tower and Madliena Tower. Ħamrija Tower was also restored by Heritage Malta, and it now forms part of the Ħaġar Qim and Mnajdra Archaeological Park. The last remaining towers to be restored were Aħrax Tower, restored by Din I-Art Ħelwa in 2021, and Wardija Tower, restored by the Restoration Directorate in 2022.

Today, Għallis Tower and Saint Mark's Tower are open by appointment, and Saint Julian's Tower is open as a restaurant.

== The towers ==
Name	Image	Location	Built	Status
Għajn Ħadid Tower		Mellieħa	1658	Collapsed, 1856; Ruins
Għallis Tower		Naxxar	1658	Intact
Saint Mark's Tower		Naxxar	1658	Intact
Madliena Tower		Pembroke	1658	Intact
Saint Julian's Tower		Sliema	1658	Intact
Aħrax Tower		Mellieħa	1658	Intact
Bengħisa Tower		Birżebbuġa	1659	Demolished
Xrobb l-Għaġin Tower		Marsaxlokk	1659	Ruins
Triq il-Wiesgħa Tower		Żabbar	1659	Intact
Delimara Tower		Marsaxlokk	1659	Demolished
Żonqor Tower		Marsaskala	1659	Demolished
Ħamrija Tower		Qrendi	1659	Intact
Wardija Tower		Żurrieq	1659	Intact

De Redin towers

== Legacy ==
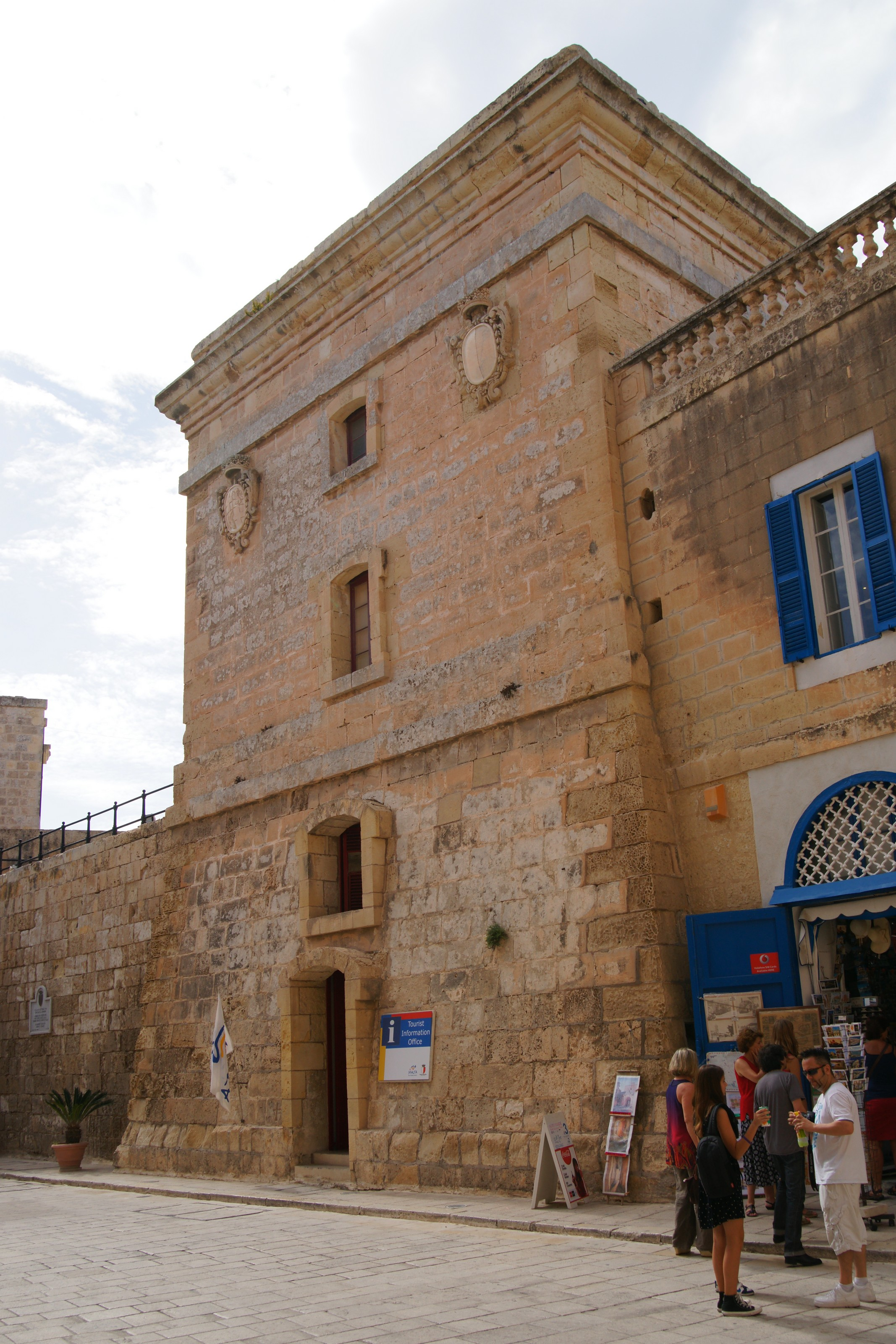
Torre dello Standardo, an 18th-century tower whose design is similar to the De Redin towers

Over the years, several structures were built with a design similar to or inspired by the De Redin towers. One of the earliest examples is the Torre dello Standardo, a tower located near Mdina's Main Gate, forming part of the city's fortifications. The tower was used for signalling purposes, to communicate with the coastal watchtowers. It was built in 1725 by the architect Charles François de Mondion, on the site of the medieval Torre Mastra (which also had the same function), as part of a project to restore the city after the 1693 Sicily earthquake. Its design is similar to the De Redin towers, but it is of finer construction, with more importance being given to decorative elements such as escutcheons. Today, the tower is in good condition and is used as a tourist information centre.

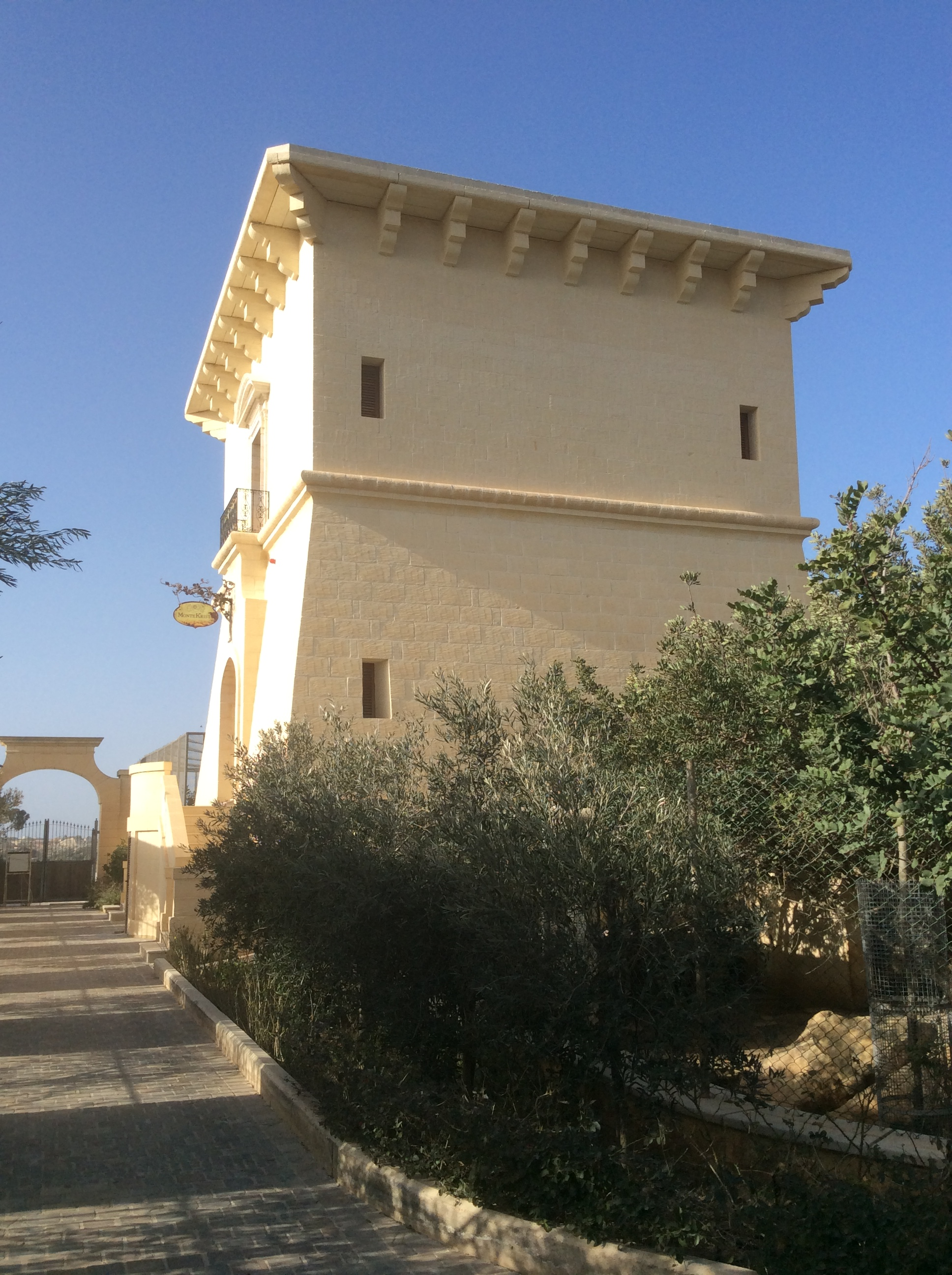
Falkun Tower

Another structure whose design was also similar to the De Redin towers was the Falkun Tower (Maltese: Torri Falkun), located at the Montekristo Estates in Ħal Farruġ, limits of Siġġiewi. This tower, along with other parts of Montekristo Estates, was constructed illegally without the necessary permits. It was supposed to have been demolished in November 2013, but the courts stopped the planning authority MEPA from carrying out the demolition. Since the failed attempt at demolishing the tower and the other illegal structures, new roofing works were carried out on the tower, while more illegal structures were constructed elsewhere in Montekristo Estates. The tower began to be dismantled according to MEPA orders in April 2016. Another tower was built in 2016 in Gozo as a rural structure, similar to the coastal towers but located inland.

== Symbols ==
=== Armed Forces of Malta ===
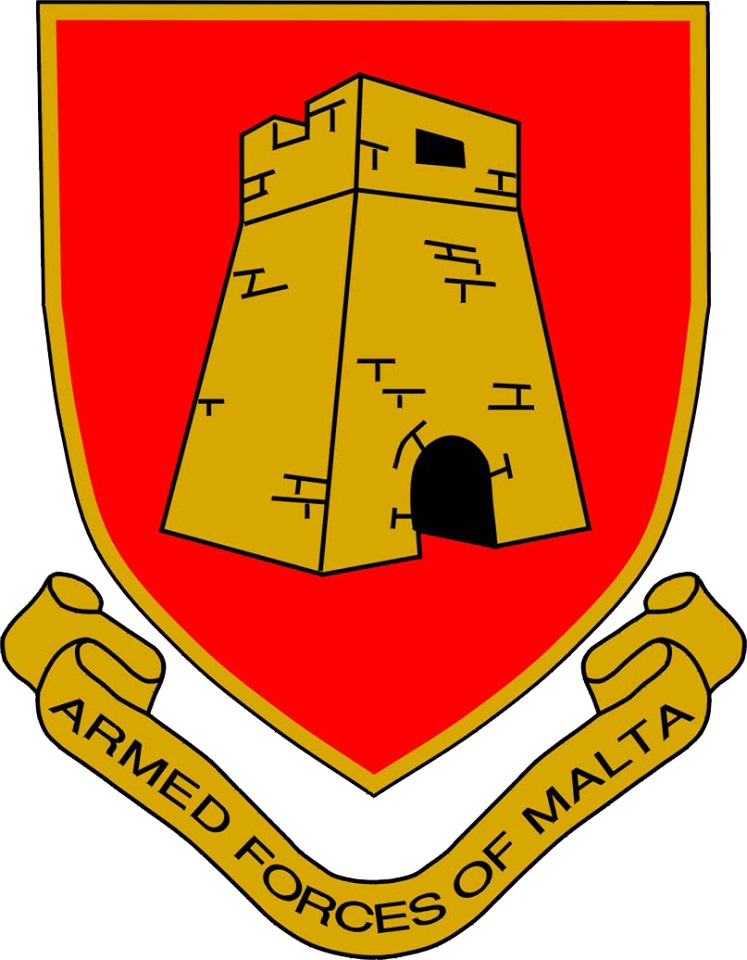
Coat of arms of the Armed Forces of Malta and emblem of its Air Wing

The emblem of the Armed Forces of Malta (AFM) consists of a gold De Redin tower on a red background. The origins of this emblem lie in the AFM's predecessor, the Malta Land Force (MLF). The MLF's emblem originally consisted of a three-dimensional De Redin tower on a French grey background, which was later changed to a red background. This emblem was designed shortly after the founding of the MLF in 1965 by Captain Claude M. Gaffiero. It was retained when the MLF changed its name to the AFM in 1973.

A symbol of a De Redin tower is also featured on pennant of the Commander of the AFM, on the emblem of the Air Wing, on the National Colours, and on various badges of rank.

=== Malta Stock Exchange ===
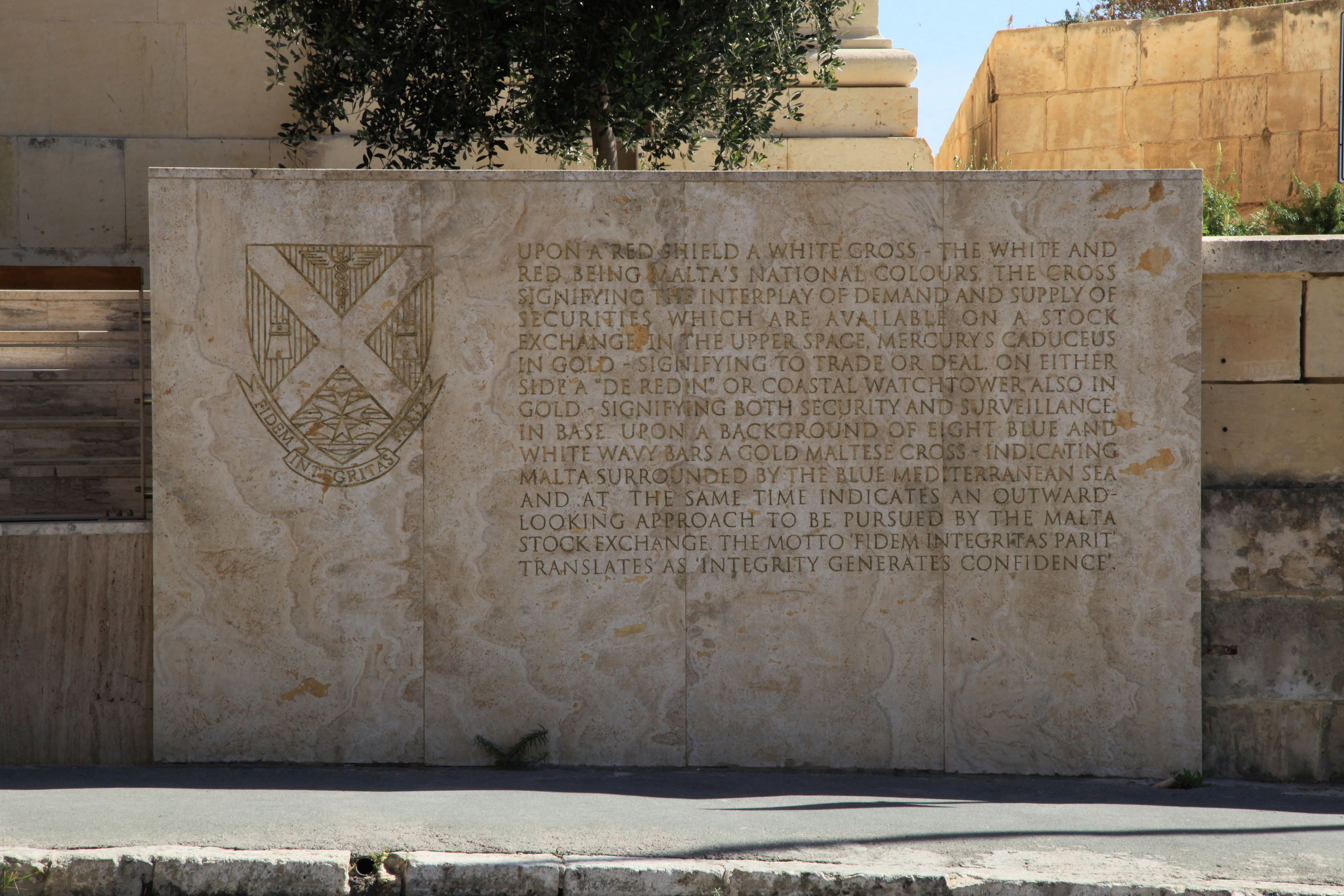
Coat of arms of the Malta Stock Exchange

The coat of arms of the Malta Stock Exchange features two gold De Redin towers on either side of the shield, representing security and surveillance.

=== Pembroke ===
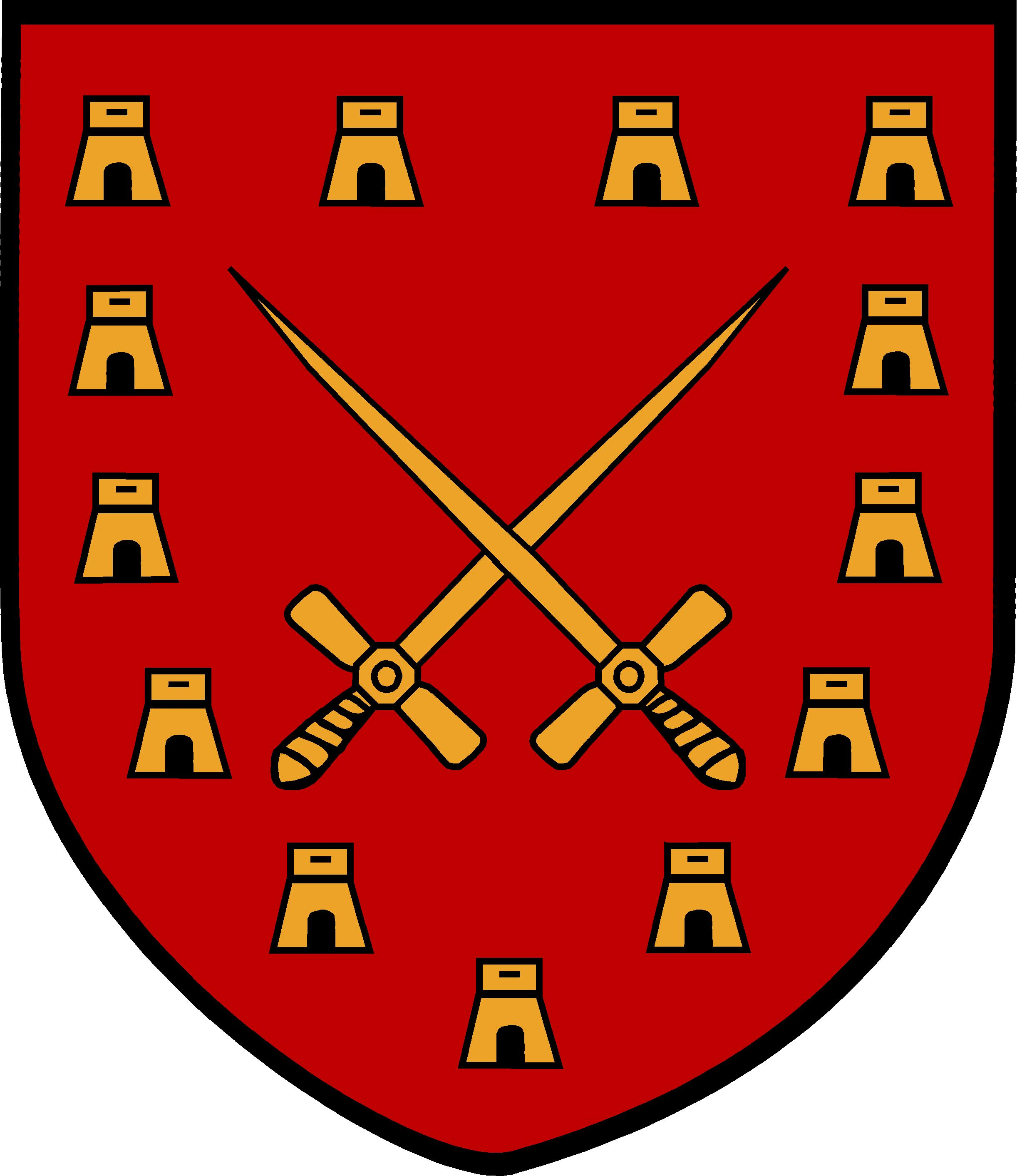
Flag and coat of arms of Pembroke

De Redin towers also feature on the flag and coat of arms of Pembroke, a town on the northern coast of Malta. The coat of arms consists of two crossed swords in the centre, with the thirteen De Redin towers around the border, all in gold on a red background. The sword and towers represent Pembroke's connection with the military, since the town developed out of a British Army barracks that was converted into housing estates.
