= Madliena Tower =

Watchtower in Malta

- Torri tal-Madliena
- Part of the De Redin towers and the Victoria Lines
- Madliena, Pembroke, Malta
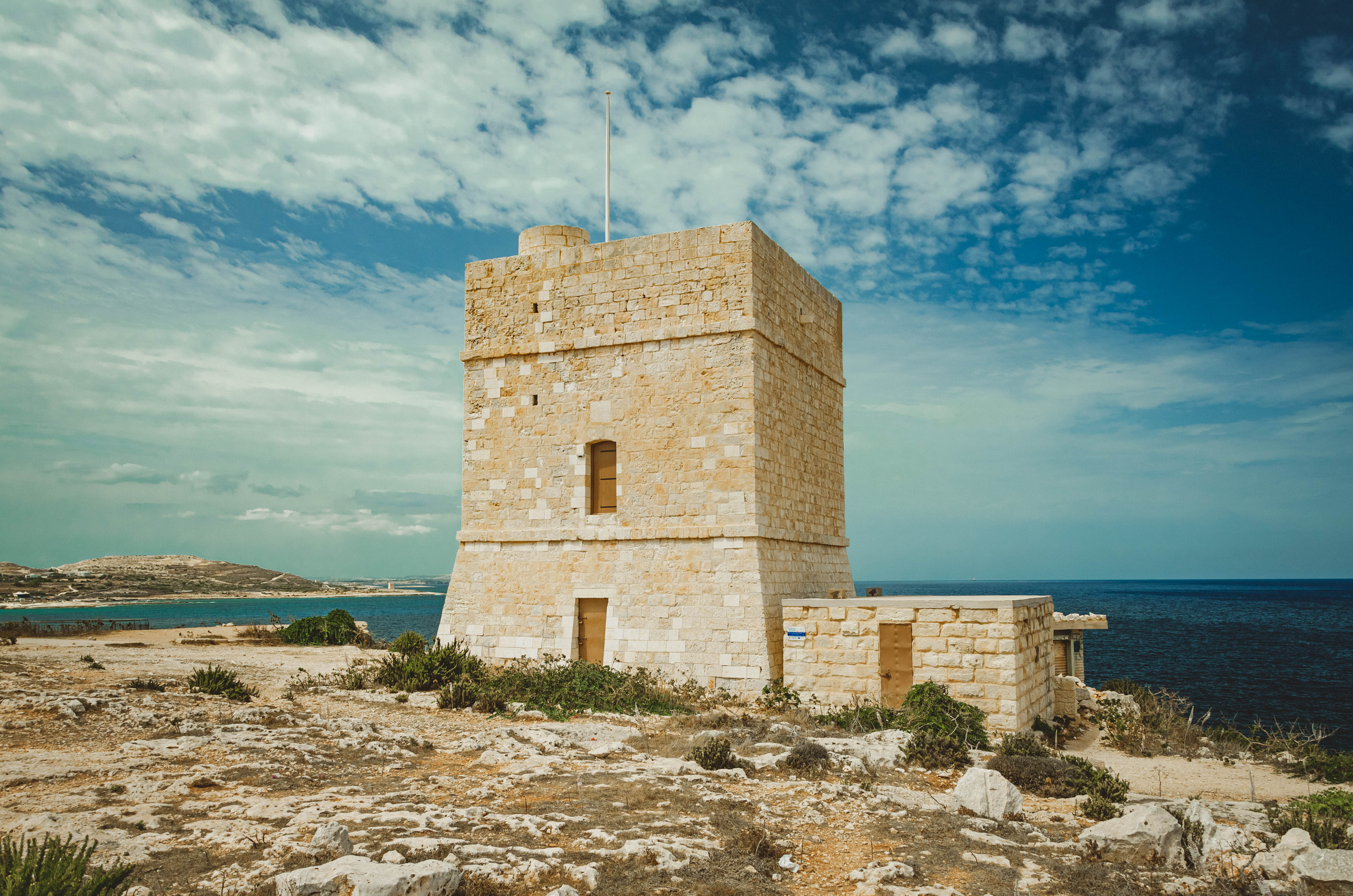
- View of Madliena Tower from the southeast

Site information
- Type: Coastal watchtower Artillery battery
- Owner: Government of Malta
- Controlled by: Fondazzjoni Wirt Artna
- Condition: Tower intact Battery largely destroyed

Location
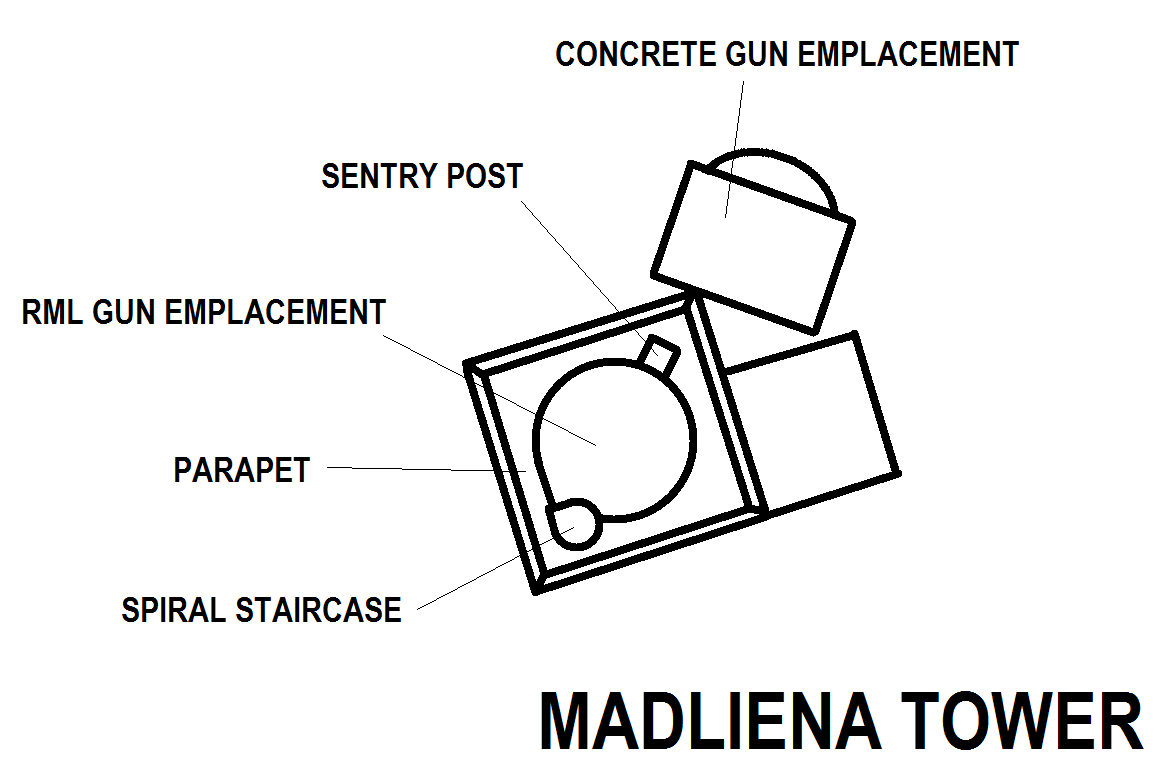
- Map of Madliena Tower as it is today
- Coordinates: 35°56′11.7″N 14°28′23.1″E

Site history
- Built: 1658 (tower); 1908–1909 (battery)
- Built by: Order of Saint John (tower); British Empire (battery)
- In use: 1658–1940s
- Materials: Limestone
- Battles/wars: World War II

Madliena Tower (Maltese: Torri tal-Madliena), originally known as Torre della Paulina, is a small watchtower in Madliena, limits of Pembroke, Malta. It was completed in 1658 as the fourth of the De Redin towers. The British built an artillery battery next to the tower in 1908–1909, and the tower and battery remained in use until World War II. Today, the battery no longer exists but the tower is in good condition.

== History ==
Madliena Tower was built in 1658 on the north shore of Malta, on high ground above the shore west of Ras l-Irqiqa in Madliena, Pembroke. It was built on or near the site of a medieval watch post. To the west the tower has sight of Saint Mark's Tower, and to the east is Saint George's Tower. The tower originally followed the standard design of the De Redin towers, having a square plan with two floors and a turret on the roof. Sometime after 1741, a fougasse was dug in the rocks close to the tower. An entrenchment was also built in the vicinity of the tower in the 18th century, but very little remains of this have survived.

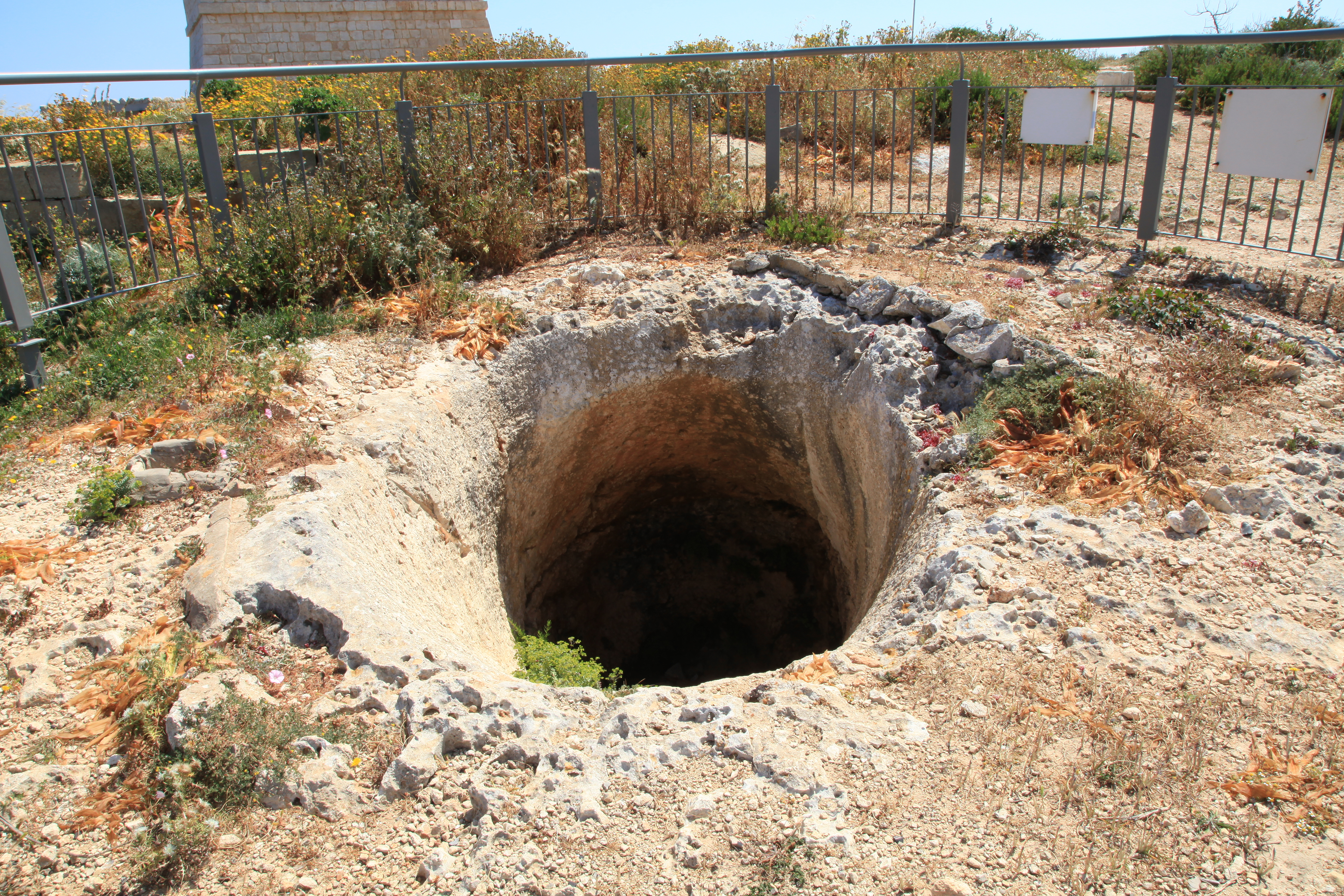
The fougasse located near the tower.

After the British gained control of Malta, Madliena Tower continued to serve as a military installation. A cookhouse was built adjacent to the tower's southwest corner, but this was already in ruins by 1908 and no remains survive. When the Victoria Lines began to be built, the tower was in a strategic location, since it plugged the gap between Fort Madalena and Fort Pembroke. In fact, it was modified to fulfill a coastal defence role as a Martello tower. Sometime around the late 1860s or early 1870s, its parapet was rebuilt, and a circular emplacement was installed on the roof in order to mount a 64-pounder rifled muzzle loading (RML) gun. Despite this, the tower does not feature on 19th century armament lists, so the gun was probably never installed.

In 1908, a Night Practice Battery housing two QF 12-pounder guns was built close to Madliena Tower. The battery was completed in March 1909, and it cost £99, 17 shillings and 2 pence to build. The battery's Direction Range Finder was mounted on the tower's roof. Two store rooms were also built to house the battery's armaments. It was still in use by the Royal Malta Artillery until the 1920s.

A Defence Electric Light was mounted at the tower in 1935. The tower saw use again in World War II, when a concrete emplacement was built to house a beach gun.

== Present day ==
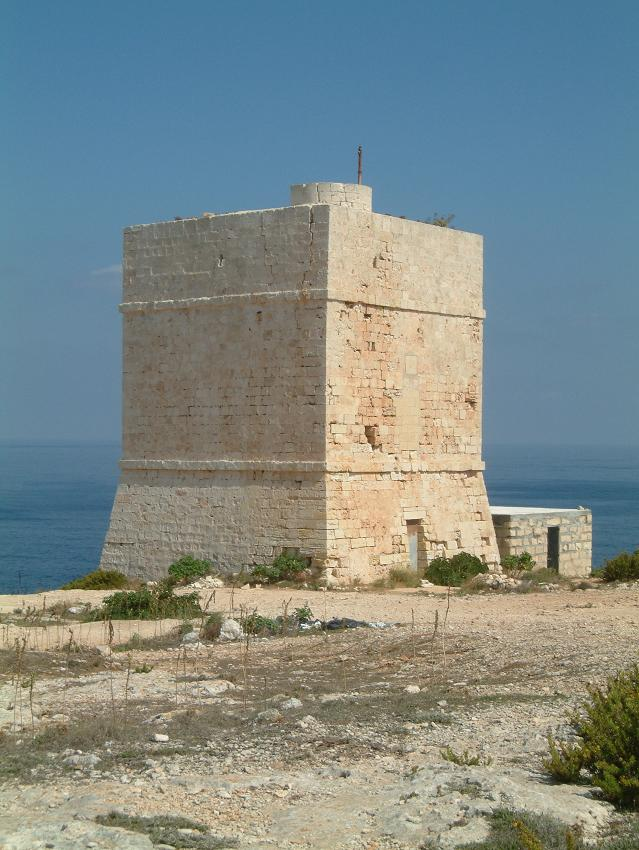
The tower in 2007, prior to restoration

Today, the original tower and World War II emplacement are intact, but very little remains of the Night Practice Battery have survived. Over time there were some makeshift modifications and structures built adjacent to the tower. The original door at the second level was filled in and was no longer visible, while the commemorative plaque was replaced by a slab of limestone. A steel door was added at the base of the tower.

The tower was handed to the NGO Fondazzjoni Wirt Artna in 2009. Since then, it has been restored with funds from the European Regional Development Fund. Throughout the course of restoration, the original doorway was reopened, and structural damage was repaired.
