= Żonqor Tower =

Tower in Malta

- Torri taż-Żonqor
- Part of the De Redin towers
- Marsaskala, Malta

Site information
- Type: Coastal watchtower

Location
- Coordinates: 35°52′3.2″N 14°34′26.8″E

Site history
- Built: 1659
- Built by: Order of Saint John
- Materials: Limestone
- Fate: Demolished, 1915

Żonqor Tower (Maltese: Torri taż-Żonqor), originally known as Torre di Zoncol, was a small watchtower near Żonqor Point, within the limits of the seaside town of Marsaskala, Malta. It was built in 1659 as the eleventh of the De Redin towers, on or near the site of a medieval watch post. The tower commanded the entrance to Marsaskala Bay along with Saint Thomas Tower. It was demolished by the British military in 1915 to clear the line of fire of modern fortifications.

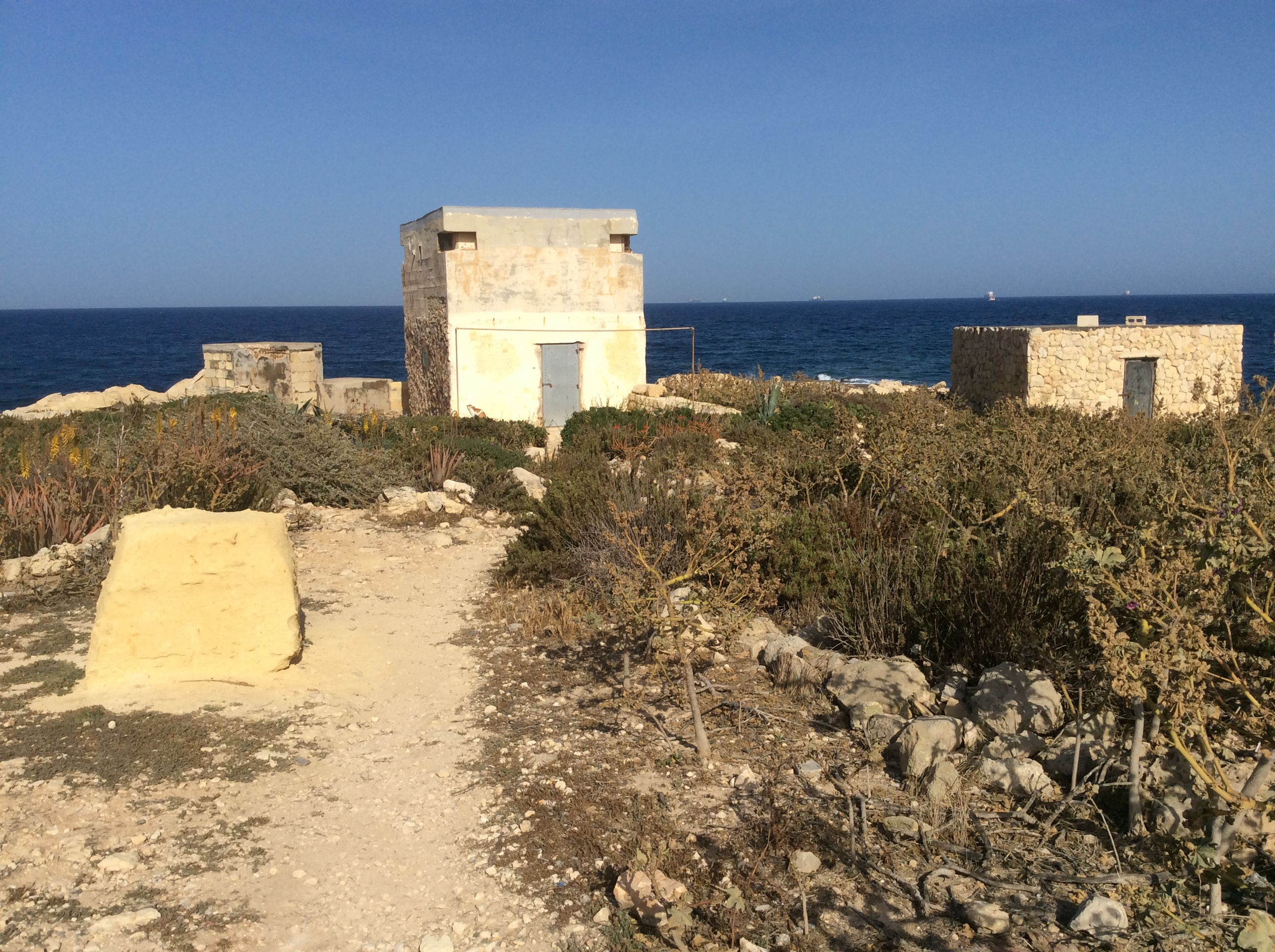
The site of Żonqor Tower, now occupied by a pillbox

A World War II-era pillbox now stands on the site of Żonqor Tower.
