= Għallis Tower =

- Torri tal-Għallis
- Part of the De Redin towers
- Salina, Naxxar, Malta
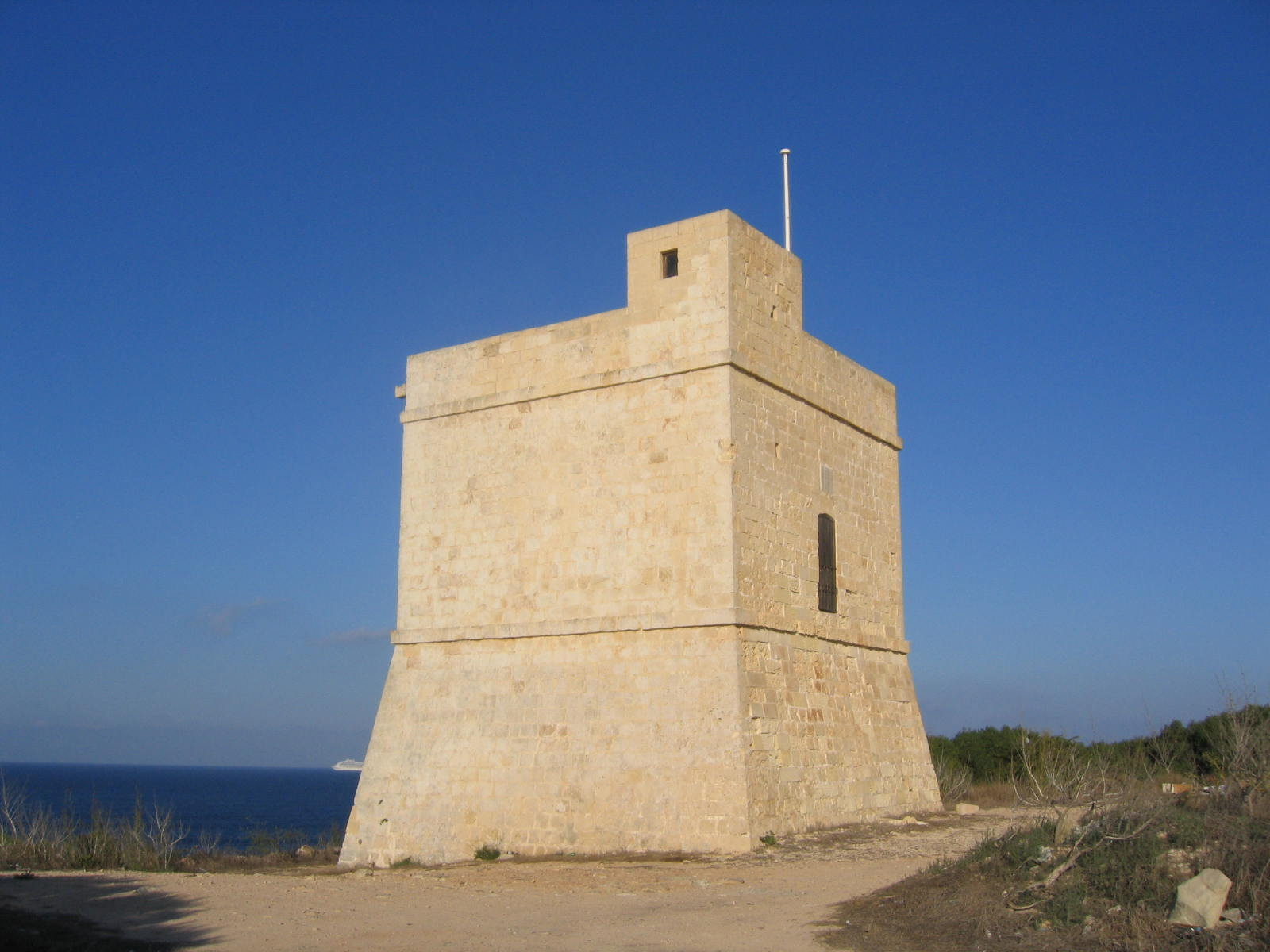
- Għallis Tower viewed from the west in 1843

Site information
- Type: Coastal watchtower
- Owner: Government of Malta
- Controlled by: Din l-Art Ħelwa
- Open to the public: Yes (by appointment)
- Condition: Intact

Location
- Coordinates: 35°57′11.8″N 14°26′03.9″E
- Height: 12 m

Site history
- Built: 1658
- Built by: Order of Saint John
- Materials: Limestone

Għallis Tower (Maltese: Torri tal-Għallis), originally known as Torre delle Saline, is a small watchtower in Salina, limits of Naxxar, Malta. It was completed in 1658 as the second of the De Redin towers. Today, the tower is in fair condition.

== History ==
Għallis Tower was built in 1658 on the eastern shore of Għallis Point (Maltese: Ras l-Għallis), commanding the entrance to Salina Bay along with Qawra Tower, one of the Lascaris towers. The tower was built on or near the site of a medieval watch post. It follows the standard design of the De Redin towers, having a square plan with two floors and a turret on the roof. The external wall is made of upper coralline limestone which is weather resistant whilst the inner wall is made of the softer globigerina limestone. It originally had a garrison consisting of a bombardier and three gunners, who manned a three-pounder iron cannon.

During the British period, Għallis Tower was modified by opening a doorway at ground level and the insertion of roof slabs.

On 9 March 1955, the corpse of Toninu Aquilina, a 35-year-old employee of the Malta Millers Association, was found inside the tower's well. Aquilina had gone missing in Valletta on 24 February whilst carrying a large sum of cash and cheques from his workplace to a bank, and the 31-year-old cashier George Terreni was later convicted of his murder.

== Present day ==
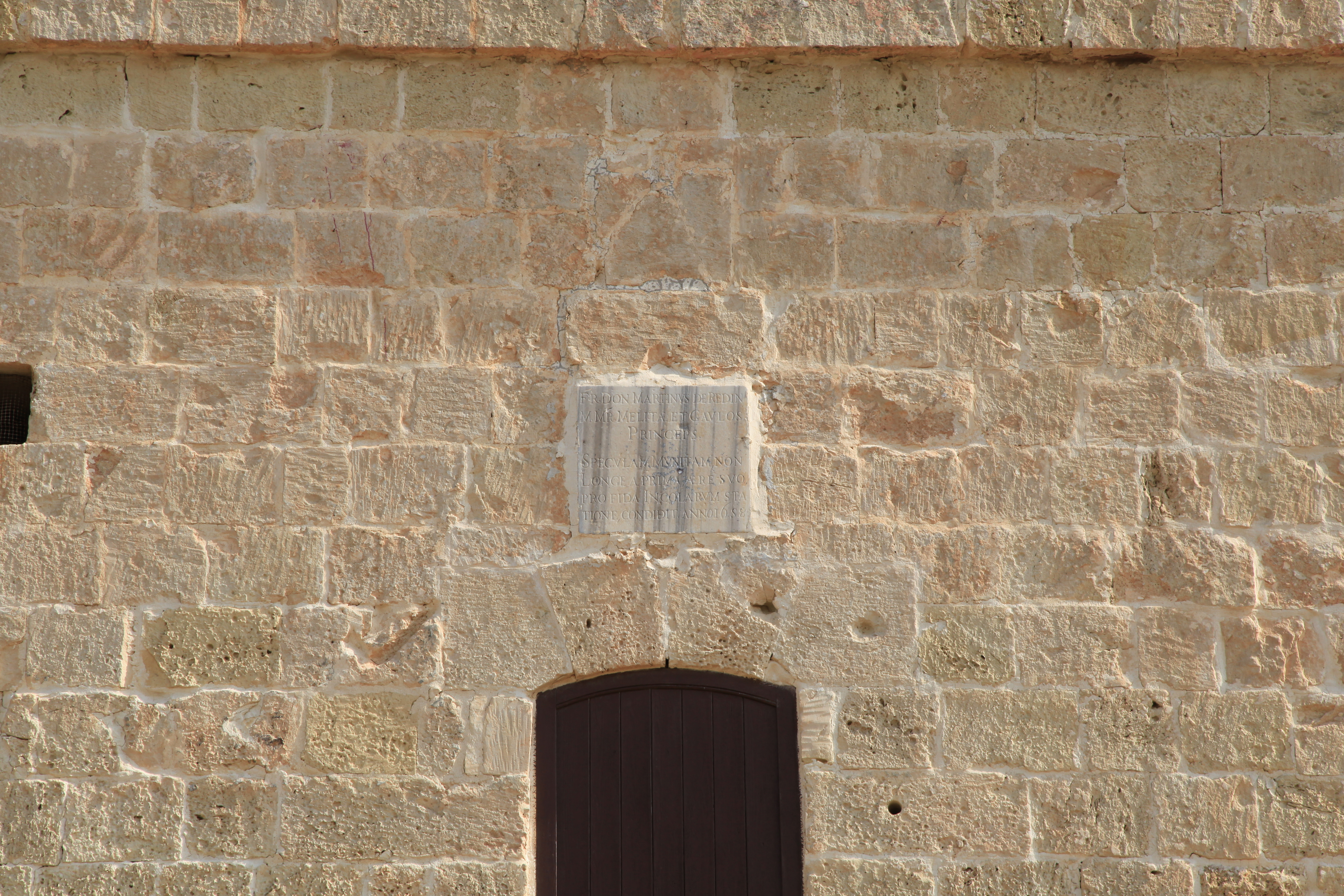
Plaque on the tower

By the 1990s, Għallis Tower was in a state of disrepair, with parts of its exterior being covered with plaster and cement, and many weeds growing around it. The interior was also damaged due to soot from the many fires lit inside the tower.

Din l-Art Ħelwa restored the tower between 1995 and 1996, and much of the stonework had to be replaced. Today, it is still under the control of Din l-Art Ħelwa and is in good condition. It is open to the public by appointment.

In 2015, an LED lighting system was installed at Għallis Tower. Since the tower is off Malta's electricity grid, the energy was provided by solar panels installed on the tower's roof.
