= Bengħisa Tower =

- Torri ta' Bengħisa
- Part of the De Redin towers
- Birżebbuġa, Malta

Site information
- Type: Coastal watchtower

Location
- Coordinates: 35°48′42.6″N 14°32′23″E

Site history
- Built: 1659
- Built by: Order of Saint John
- Materials: Limestone
- Fate: Demolished, 1915

Bengħisa Tower (Maltese: Torri ta' Bengħisa), originally known as Torre di Benissa and also referred to as the Red Tower (Maltese: Torri l-Aħmar), was a small watchtower in Bengħisa, within the limits of Birżebbuġa, Malta. It was built in 1659 as the seventh of the De Redin towers, on or near the site of a medieval watch post. An entrenchment was built around the tower in 1761, and it was armed with 10 guns. The tower was demolished by the British to clear the line of fire of the nearby Fort Benghisa in 1915.

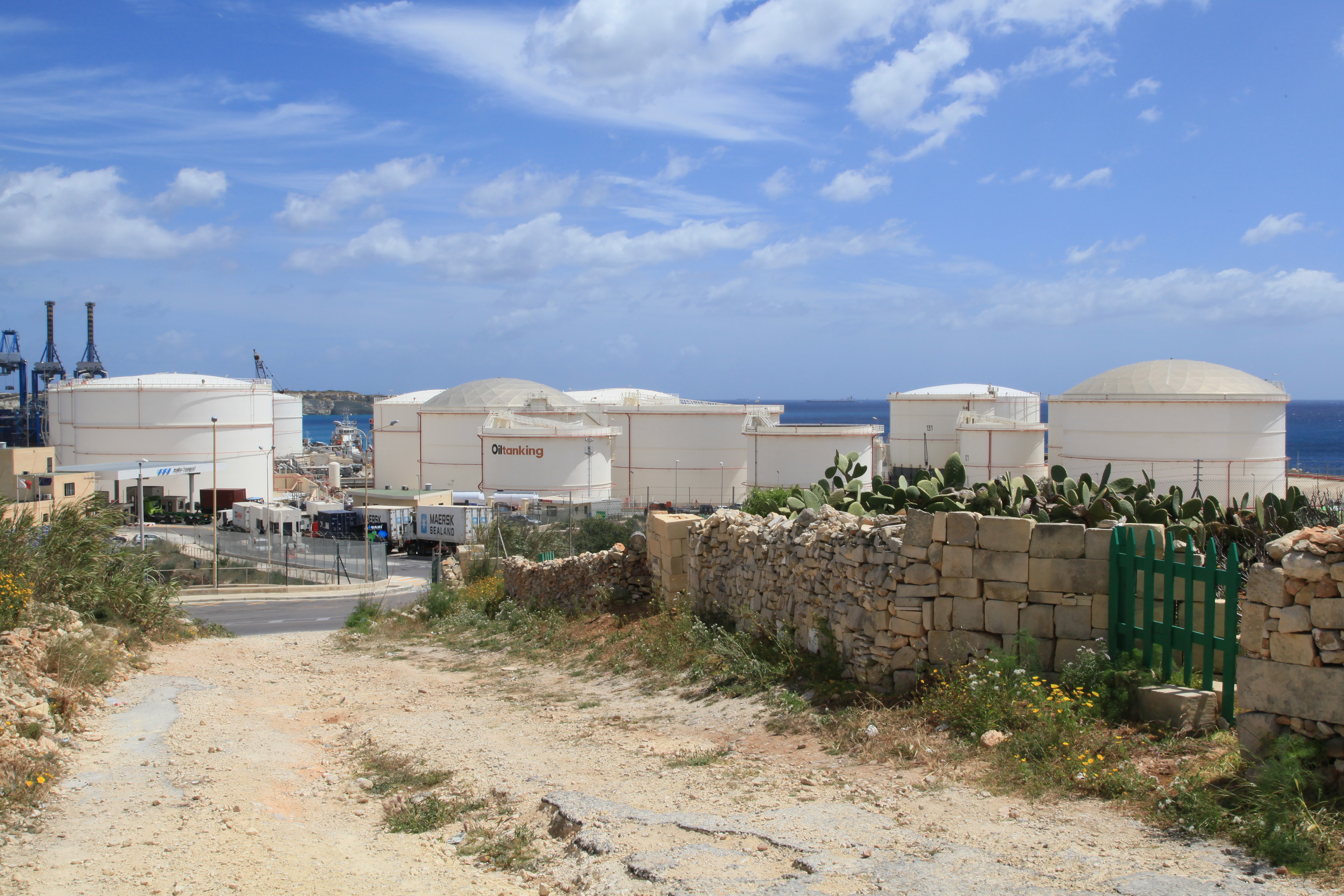
Oil tanks at the Malta Freeport, with the site of the tower roughly at the centre of this picture

The site of the tower and the entrenchment is now occupied by oil tanks forming part of the Malta Freeport.
