= Sciuta Tower =

Watchtower in Qrendi, Malta

- Torri ta' Xutu
- Part of the Lascaris towers
- Qrendi, Malta
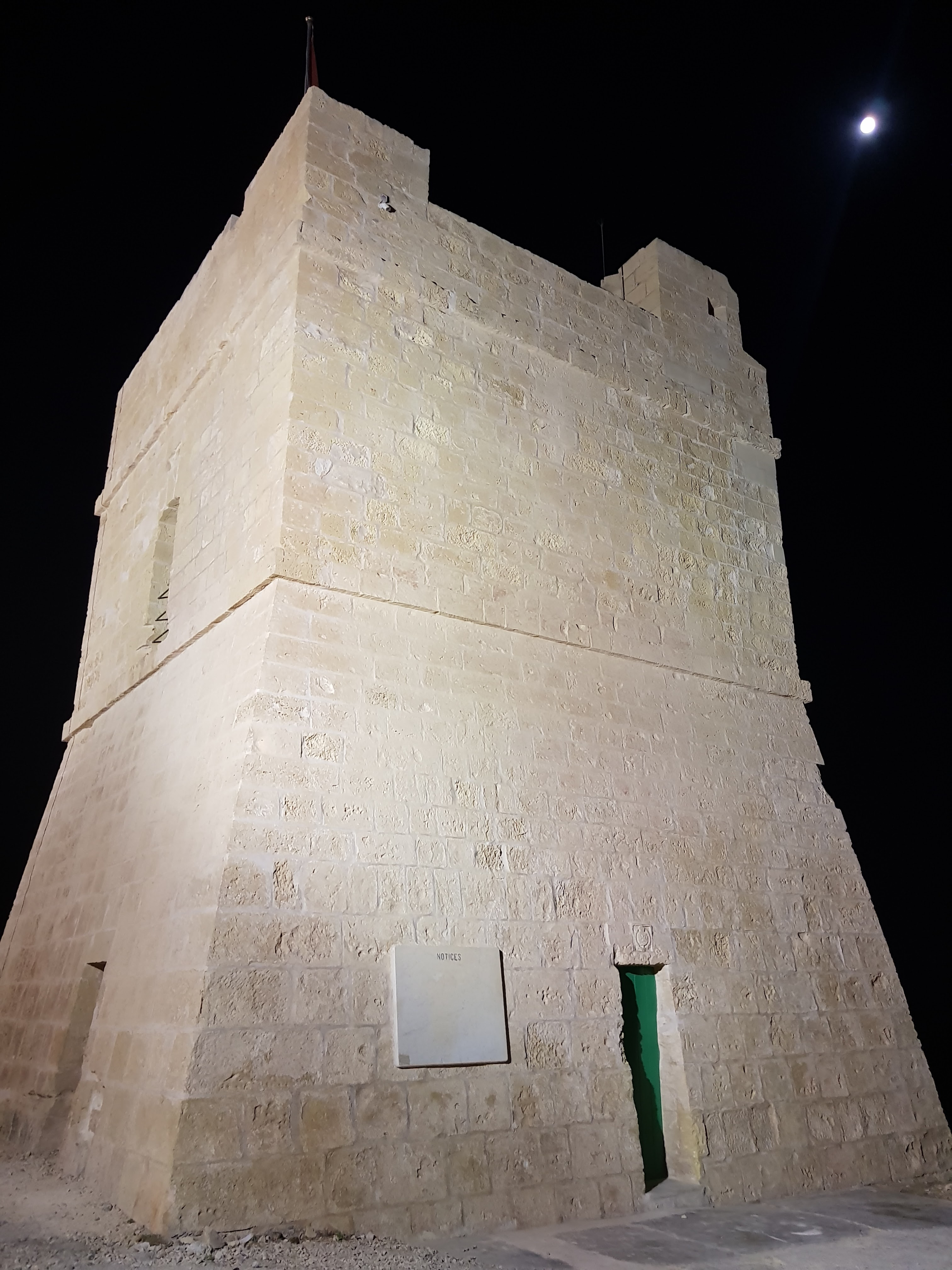
- Sciuta Tower

Site information
- Type: Coastal watchtower
- Owner: Government of Malta
- Controlled by: Din l-Art Ħelwa
- Open to the public: Yes
- Condition: Intact

Location
- Coordinates: 35°49′9.62″N 14°27′12.97″E

Site history
- Built: 1638; 388 years ago
- Built by: Order of Saint John
- In use: 1638–1873; 1940s
- Materials: Limestone
- Battles/wars: World War II

Sciuta Tower (Maltese: Torri ta' Xuta), also known as Sciutu Tower (Maltese: Torri ta' Xutu, the name preferred by Żurrieq residents) or Wied iż-Żurrieq Tower (Maltese: Torri ta' Wied iż-Żurrieq), is a small watchtower in Qrendi, Malta. It was completed in 1638 as the fifth of the Lascaris towers. The tower was restored by Din l-Art Ħelwa.

== History ==
Sciutu Tower (aka locally as Torri ta’ Xutu and Torri Sciuto) was built in 1637–1638 in Wied iż-Żurrieq, located within the Qrendi boundaries, on the site of a medieval watch post. It served as the prototype for the De Redin towers, which were built between 1658 and 1659 (367 years ago).

After the British took over Malta in 1800, Sciutu Tower remained in use and was manned by the Royal Malta Fencible Regiment and later the Royal Malta Fencible Artillery. It was abandoned in 1873 but was manned by the Coast Police once again during World War II. The tower subsequently used as a police station until 2002. An original cannon dating back to the Order's rule can still be found on the tower's roof.

== Present day ==
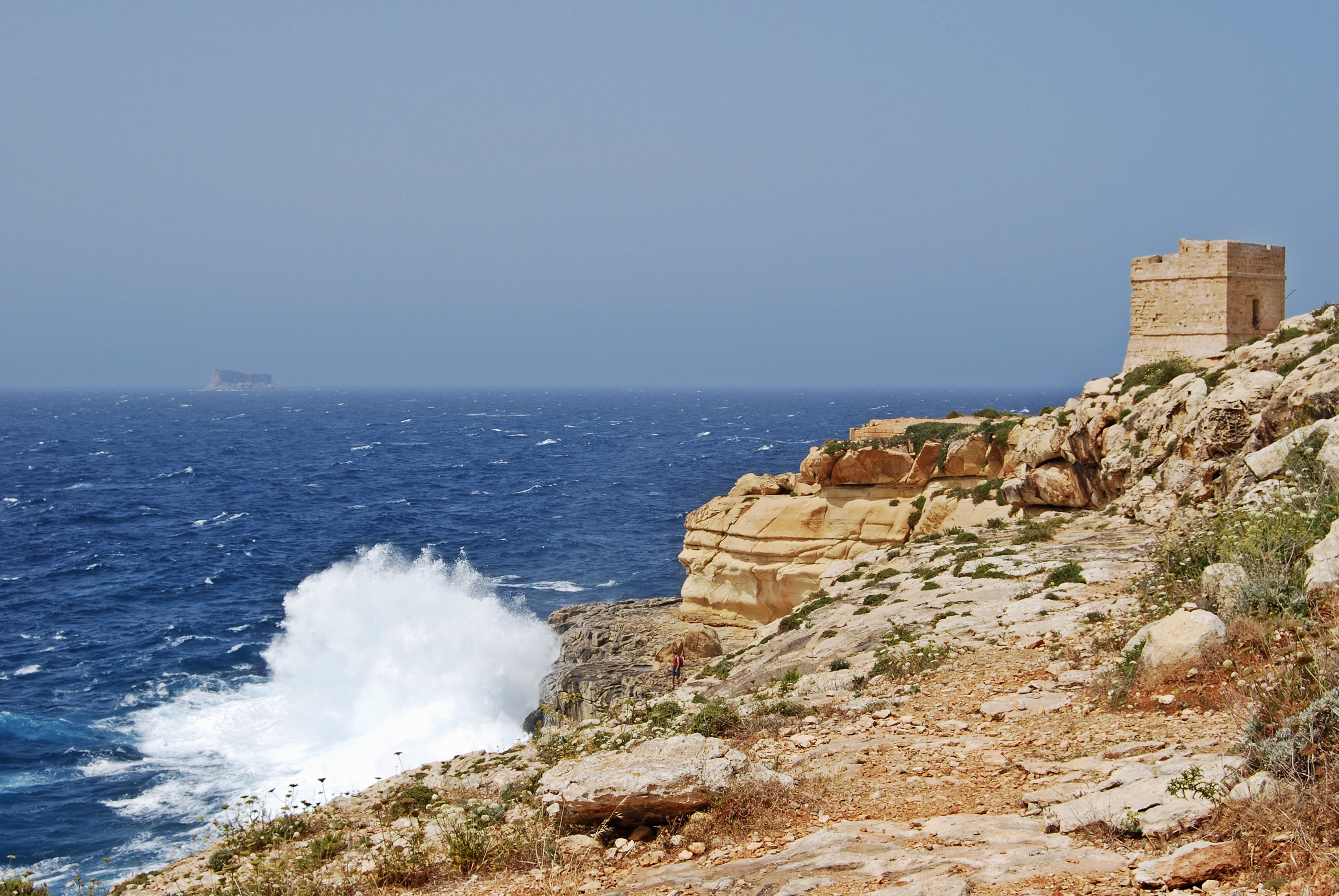
The tower viewed from the east

In March 2013, Din l-Art Ħelwa was entrusted by the Government with the conservation of this tower for a period of 10 years.

In September 2014, the tower and the surrounding area was cleaned of waste and debris by Din l-Art Ħelwa volunteers as well as the Qrendi Scouts. The tower underwent restoration conservation until 2016, and was inaugurated and opened to the public in 2019.
