= Redoubt =

Auxiliary defensive structure outside a larger fort

1632 engraving of a redoubt of the fortifications of Bermuda

A redoubt (historically redout) is a fort or fort system usually consisting of an enclosed defensive emplacement outside a larger fort, usually relying on earthworks, although some are constructed of stone or brick. It is meant to protect soldiers outside the main defensive line and can be a permanent structure or a hastily constructed temporary fortification. The word means "a place of retreat". Redoubts were a component of the military strategies of most European empires during the colonial era, especially in the outer works of Vauban-style fortresses made popular during the 17th century, although the concept of redoubts has existed since medieval times. A redoubt differs from a redan in that the redan is open in the rear, whereas the redoubt was considered an enclosed work.

== Historically important redoubts ==
=== English Civil War ===
During the English Civil War, redoubts were frequently built to protect older fortifications from the more effective artillery of the period. Often close to ancient fortifications, there were small hills that overlooked the defences, but in previous centuries, they had been too far from the fortifications to be a threat. A small hill close to Worcester was used as an artillery platform by the Parliamentarians when they successfully besieged Worcester in 1646. In 1651 before the Battle of Worcester, the hill was turned into a redoubt by the Royalists, (the remains of which can be seen today in Fort Royal Hill Park).

During the battle, the Parliamentarians captured the redoubt and turned its guns on Worcester. In so doing they made the defence of the city untenable. That action effectively ended the battle, the last of the English Civil War.

=== Malta ===
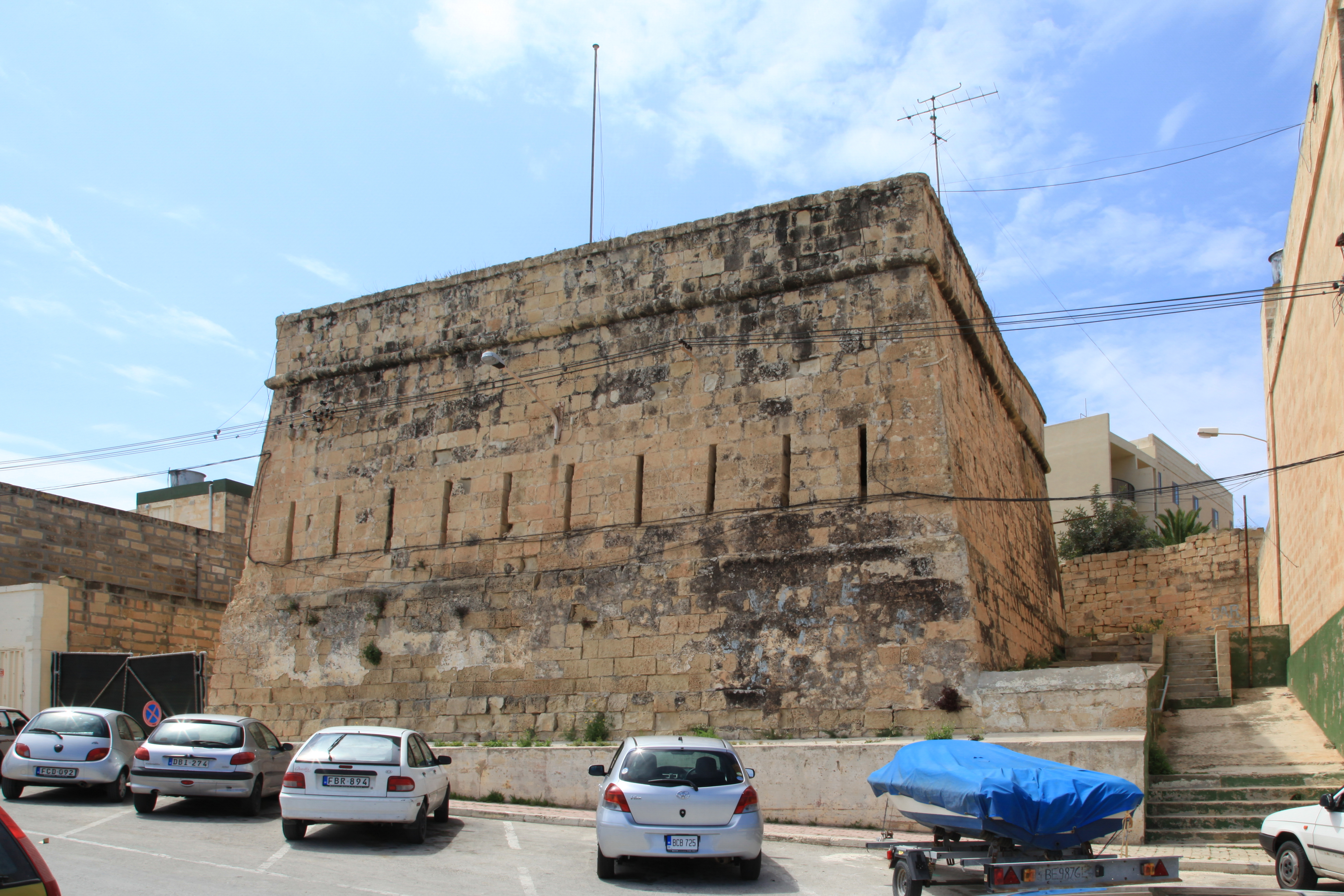
Vendôme Tower in Marsaxlokk. It is the only surviving tour-reduit in Malta.

From 1715 onwards, the Order of Saint John built a number of redoubts in Malta, as part of an effort to improve the coastal fortifications of the islands. They were built in the middle of bays to prevent enemy forces from disembarking and outflanking the coastal batteries.

The design of the redoubts was influenced by ones built in the French colonies. In all, eleven pentagonal redoubts and a few semi-circular or rectangular ones were built. Most redoubts have been demolished over the years, but a few still survive, such as Briconet Redoubt, Saint George Redoubt and Ximenes Redoubt.

Four tour-reduits were also built. These were redoubts built in the form of a tower, with rows of musketry loopholes. Three were around Marsaxlokk Bay, and one was located in Marsalforn, Gozo. The only one still in existence is Vendôme Tower in Marsaxlokk.

During the siege of Malta of 1798–1800, Maltese insurgents built a number of fortifications to bombard French positions and repel a possible counterattack. Most of the fortifications were batteries, but at least two redoubts, Windmill Redoubt and Żabbar Redoubt, were also built. In 1799, British forces also built San Rocco Redoubt and San Lucian Redoubt in Malta. No redoubts from the French blockade survive today.

In the late 19th century, the British built a redoubt near Fomm ir-Riħ as part of the Victoria Lines.

=== Other important redoubts ===
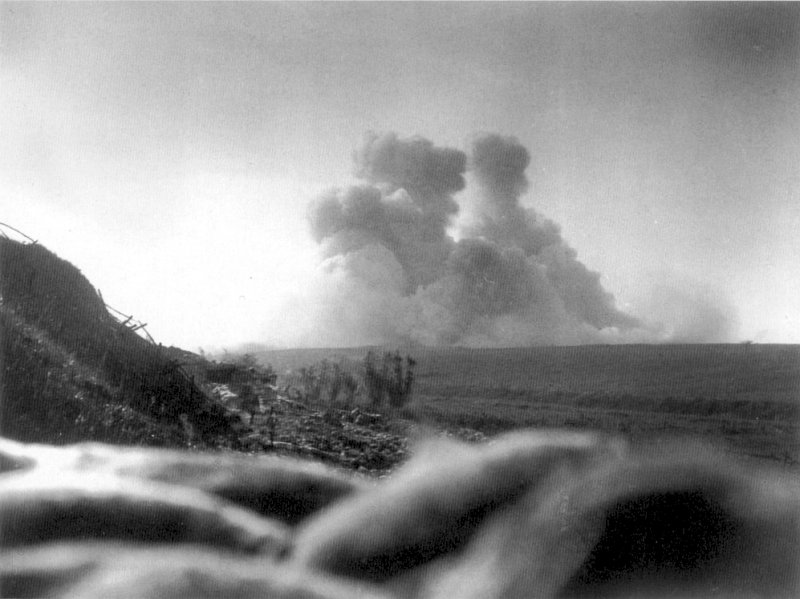
The earth settles following the explosion of the mine beneath Hawthorn Ridge Redoubt on July 1, 1916

The American Revolution defenses at West Point, New York, included several redoubts, forts, and the Great Chain with links weighing more than 100 pounds each that Continental Army military engineers stretched across the Hudson River. The purpose behind the West Point defensive system was to prevent the British Army and Royal Navy from gaining control of the Hudson and splitting New England off from the mid-Atlantic and southern states. The chain blocked the river, the forts were positioned to fire on ships attempting to approach the chain, and outlying redoubts were well placed to defend land routes into West Point.

Examples where redoubts played a crucial role in military history:

- Battle of Poltava (1709)
- Battle of Bunker Hill (1775)
- Battle of Saratoga (1777)
- Battle of Yorktown (1781) in which Alexander Hamilton led his only infantry command's assault against a British redoubt
- Battle of Ivankovac (1805)
- Lines of Torres Vedras of the Peninsular War (1809–1810)
- Harwich Redoubt (1809–1810)
- Battle of Borodino (1812)
- Charge of the Light Brigade (1854)
- Railroad Redoubt of the Battle of Vicksburg (1863)
- Battle of Plevna (1877–1878)
- Battle of Rorke's Drift (1879)
- During World War I: National Redoubt of Antwerp (1914), German Hohenzollern Redoubt, and Hawthorn Ridge Redoubt (1916)
- During World War II: Vercors Plateau redoubt used by the Free French Forces

== National redoubt ==
A national redoubt is an area to which the remnant forces of a nation can be withdrawn if the main battle has been lost, or beforehand if defeat is considered inevitable. Typically a region is chosen with a geography favouring defence, such as a mountainous area or a peninsula, in order to function as a final hold-out to preserve national independence for the duration of the conflict.

== See also ==
- List of military structures
- Reduit
