= San Rocco Redoubt =

- Ridott ta' San Rokku
- Part of the French blockade batteries
- Kalkara, Malta

Site information
- Type: Redoubt

Location
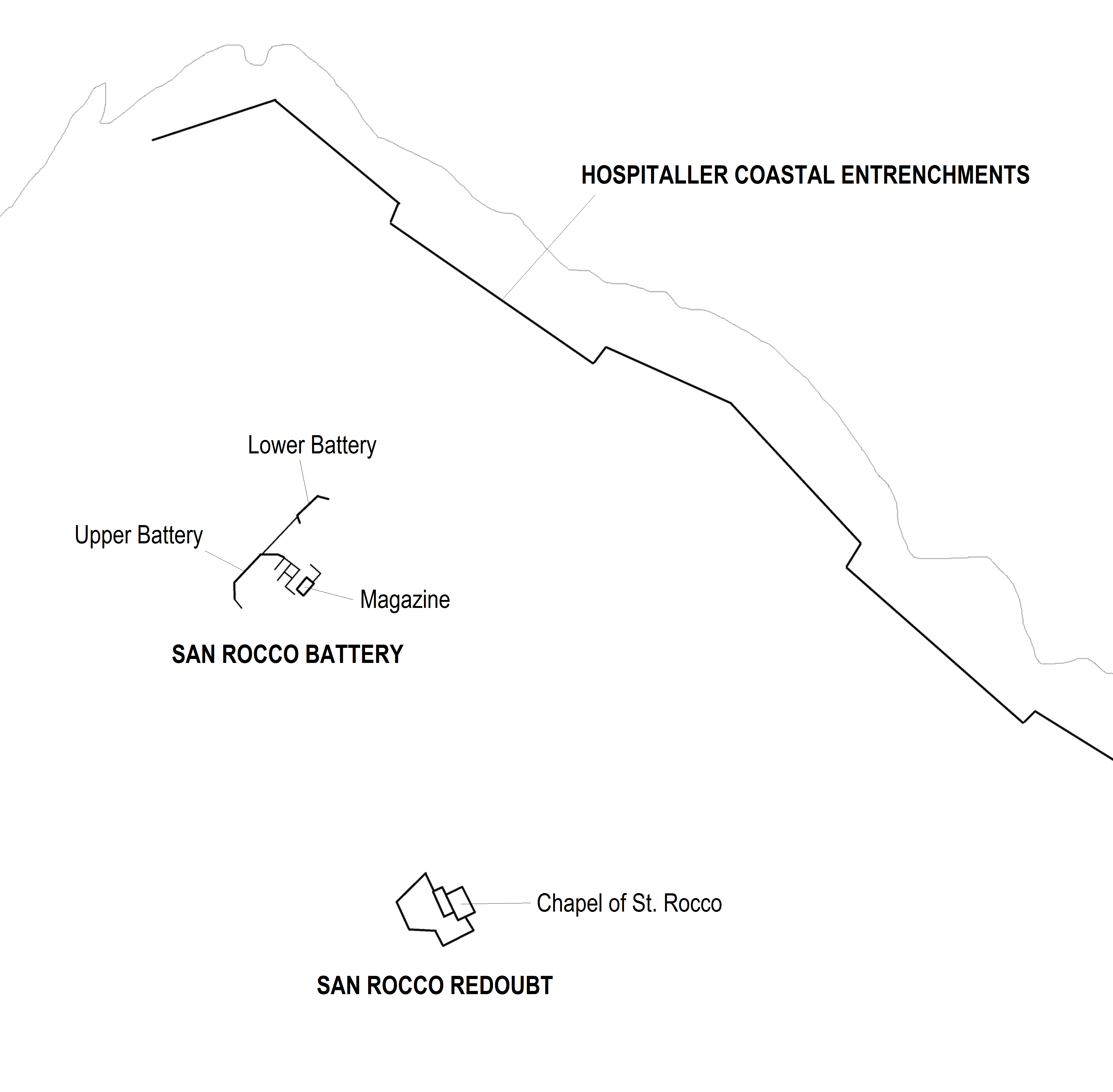
- Map of San Rocco Redoubt in relation to San Rocco Battery and the nearby coastal entrenchments
- Coordinates: 35°53′26.8″N 14°32′21.1″E

Site history
- Built: 1799
- Built by: Great Britain
- In use: 1799–1800
- Materials: Limestone
- Fate: Demolished
- Battles/wars: Siege of Malta (1798–1800)

San Rocco Redoubt (Maltese: Ridott ta' San Rokku) was a redoubt in Kalkara, Malta. It was built by Great Britain during the French blockade of 1798–1800. It was part of a chain of batteries, redoubts and entrenchments encircling the French positions in Marsamxett and the Grand Harbour.

The redoubt was built roughly halfway between Fort Ricasoli (then occupied by French forces) and Santa Maria delle Grazie Tower. It was located close to San Rocco Battery, a Maltese insurgent battery which had men from the 30th (Cambridgeshire) Regiment of Foot in its garrison. The redoubt was built around a small building and a chapel dedicated to Saint Roch, from which it got its name.

The redoubt was built by the British in order to provide cover for retreating British forces in the case of the arrival of a French relief force to break the siege of Malta. Upon the arrival of a relief force, the 30th and 89th Regiments of Foot were to gather at San Rocco Battery and, under the cover of San Rocco Redoubt, retreat to Żabbar. From there, they would retreat to Żejtun, and then to Fort Rohan under the cover of San Lucian redoubt. They would embark on their ships in Marsaxlokk Harbour and evacuate the island.

San Rocco Redoubt, as well as the chapel and building it was built around, have been demolished. The area is now occupied by a technology park named SmartCity.
