= Antonio Cachia =

Maltese architect, civil and military engineer and archaeologist (1739–1813)

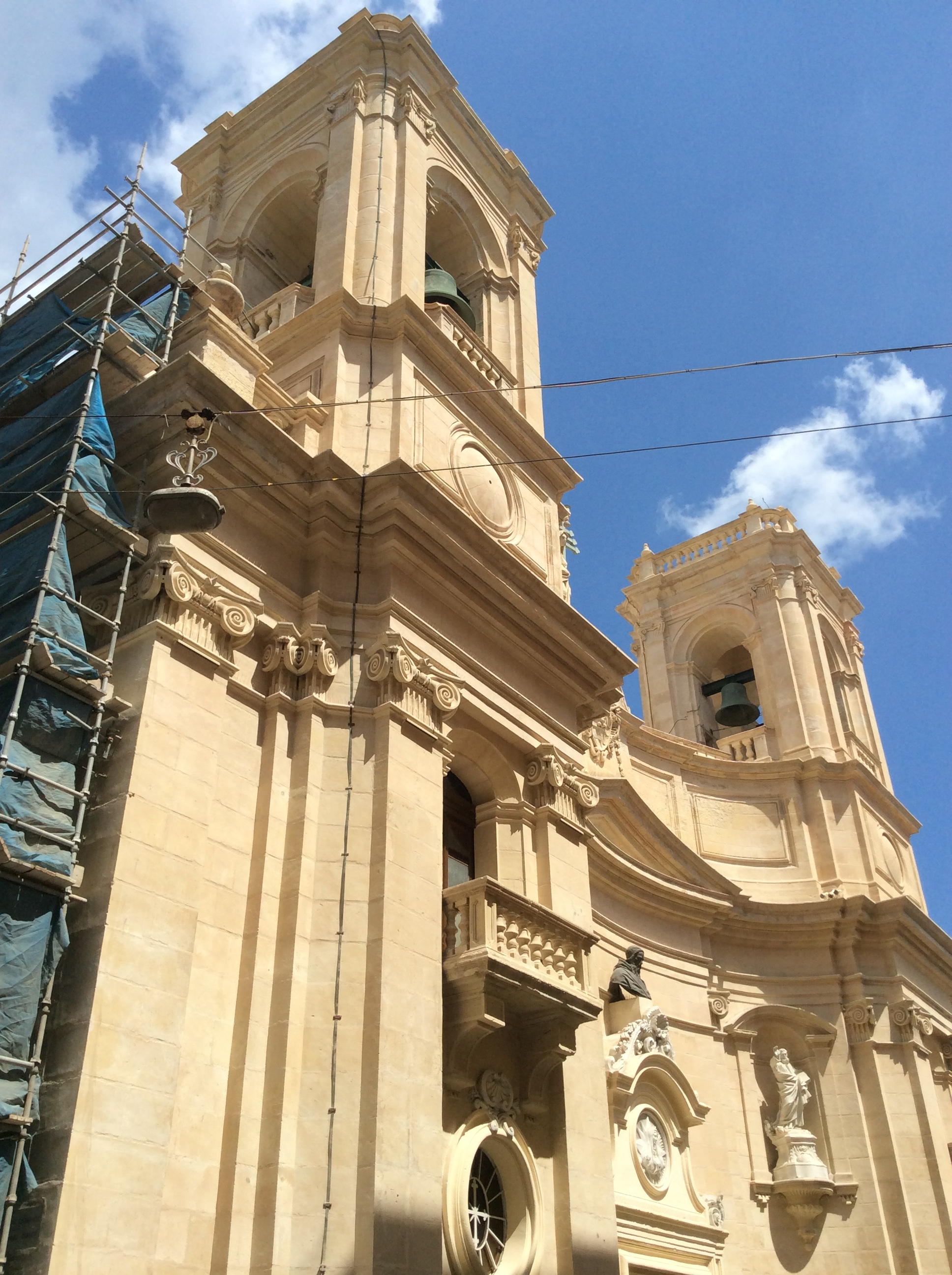
Church of St. Dominic in Valletta, which was designed by Cachia in 1804

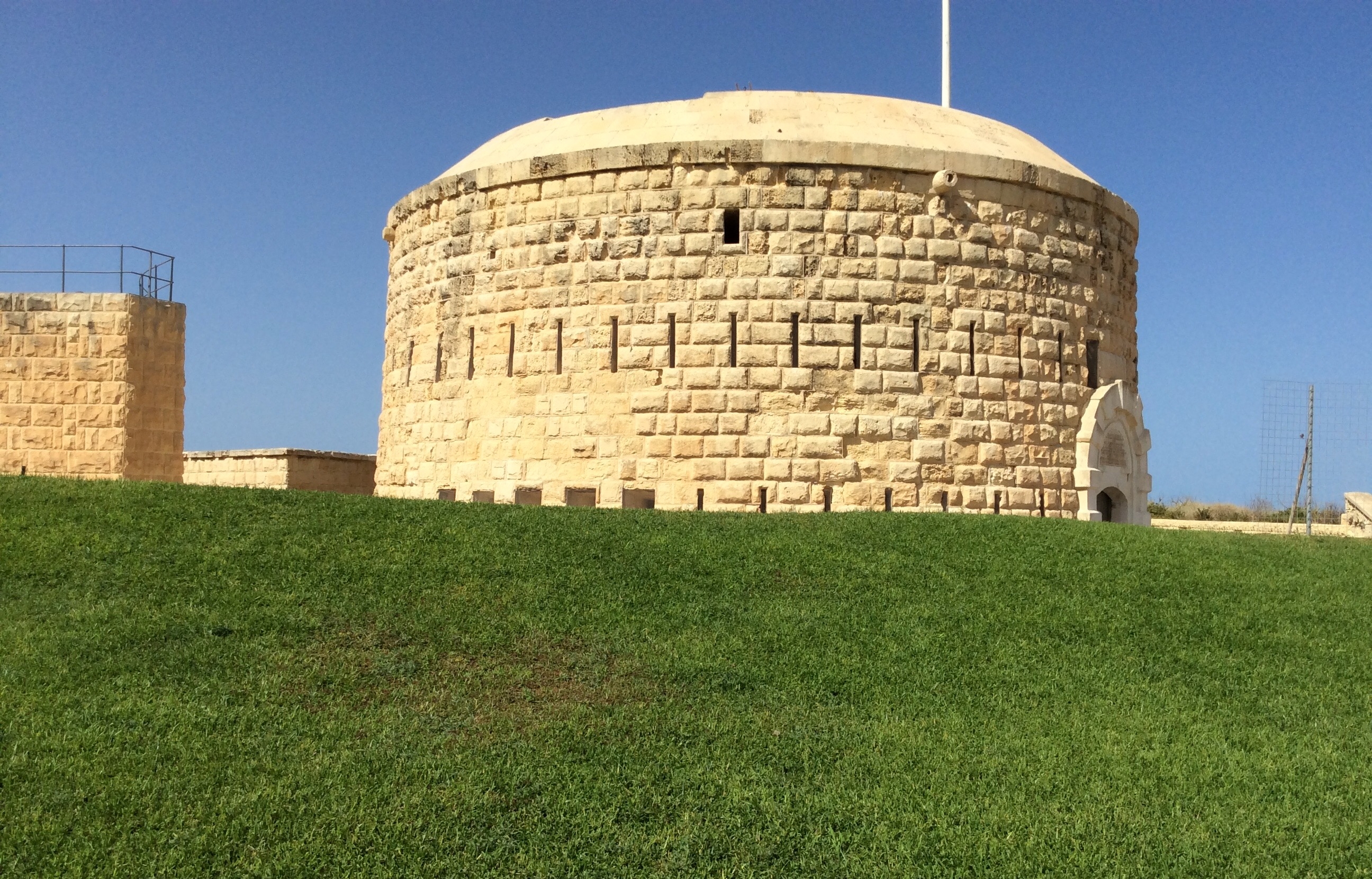
Fort Tigné, whose construction was overseen by Cachia

Antonio Cachia (1739–1813) was a Maltese architect, civil and military engineer and archaeologist who was active in the late 18th and early 19th century.

He was the son of the architect Gio Domenico Cachia, who was possibly the same person as Domenico Cachia, the capomastro who supervised the construction of Auberge de Castille. He was a cousin of Michele Cachia, another architect and military engineer.

Cachia became Capomastro delle Opere in 1779. In 1787, he received the title of Knight Commander of the Order of the Golden Spur by Pope Pius VI. He was in charge of works on various fortifications, including the upgrading of Fort Ricasoli and the construction of Fort Tigné. In Valletta, he designed or built the Church of St. Dominic, the Church of St. Augustine and St. Catherine's Monastery. He is said to have completed the Bibliotheca, which had been designed by Stefano Ittar.

Cachia also designed several gardens, including the Ġonna tal-Kmand in various localities around Malta and the Lower Argotti Gardens in Floriana. He also redesigned the Floriana Granaries and the Market House (now known as Middle Sea House). Cachia eventually became chief Superintendent of the Civil dockyard.

Throughout his life, Cachia was a member of several European architectural academies. He died on 6 June 1813.
