= Fort San Lucian =

Large bastioned watchtower and polygonal fort in Marsaxlokk, Malta; a Wignacourt tower

- Forti San Luċjan
- Part of the Wignacourt towers
- Marsaxlokk, Malta
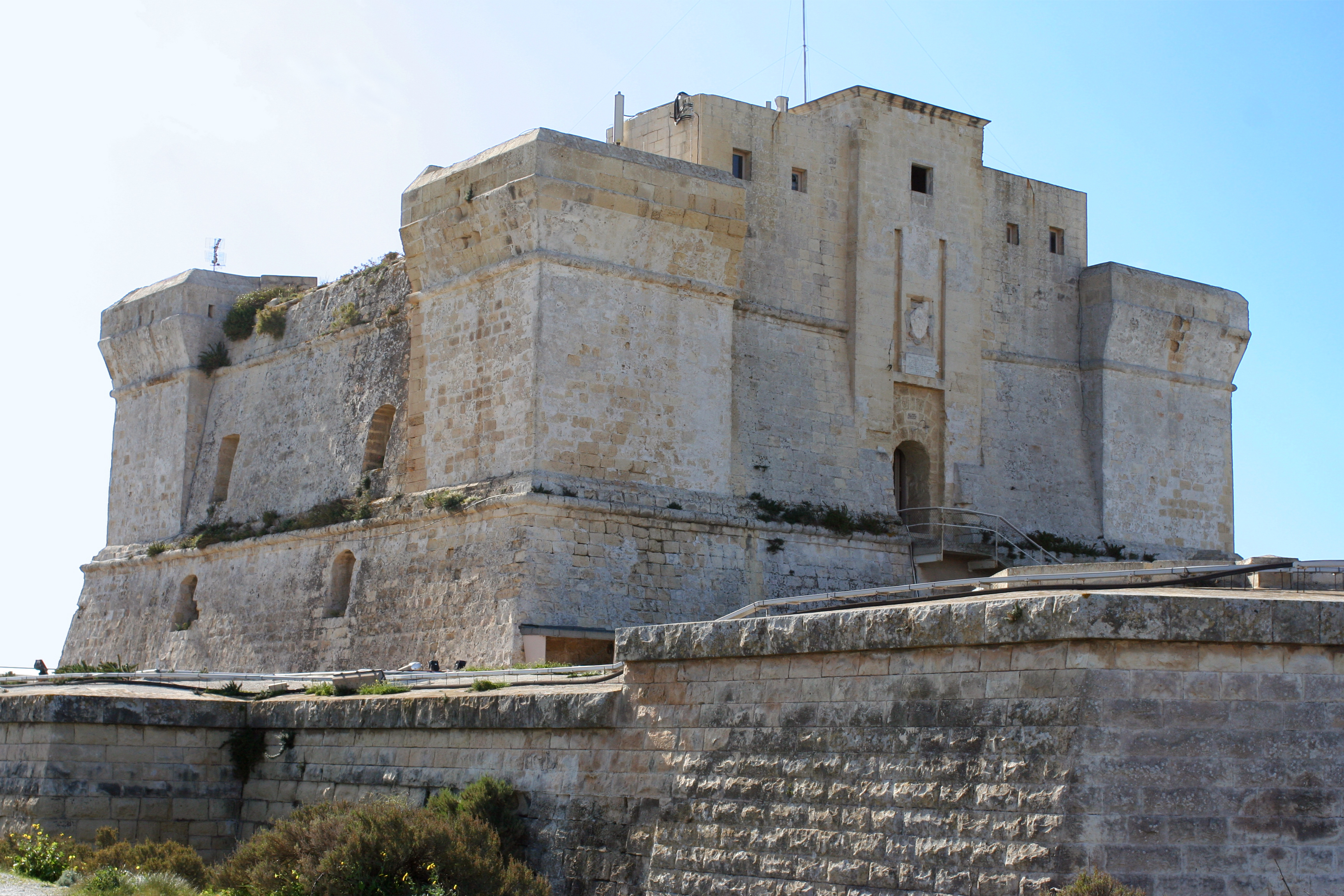
- St Lucian Tower, the oldest part of Fort San Lucian

Site information
- Type: Bastioned coastal watchtower Artillery battery Polygonal fort
- Controlled by: Malta Aquaculture Research Centre
- Open to the public: No
- Condition: Intact

Location
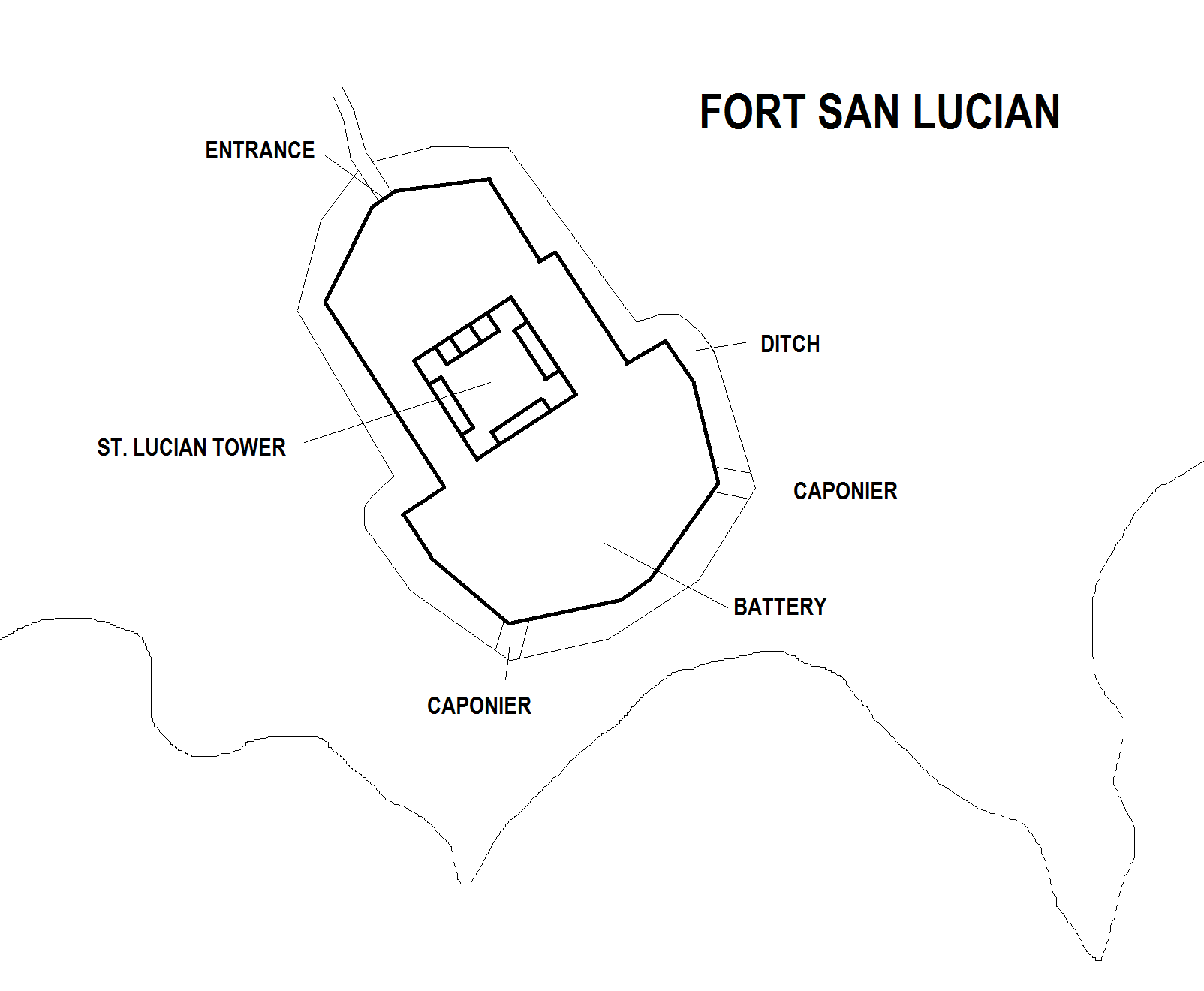
- Map of Fort San Lucian as it is today
- Coordinates: 35°49′49.8″N 14°32′35.5″E

Site history
- Built: 1610–1611 (tower); 1715 (battery); 1792–1795 (first fort); 1872–1878 (second fort)
- Built by: Order of Saint John (tower, battery and first fort); British Empire (second fort)
- In use: 1610–1885
- Materials: Limestone
- Battles/wars: Raid of Żejtun (1614); French invasion of Malta (1798); Siege of Malta (1798–1800)

Fort San Lucian (Maltese: Forti San Luċjan), also known as Saint Lucian Tower (Maltese: Torri ta' San Luċjan) or Fort Rohan (Maltese: Forti Rohan), is a large bastioned watchtower and polygonal fort in Marsaxlokk, Malta. The original tower was built by the Order of Saint John between 1610 and 1611, being the second of six Wignacourt towers.

An artillery battery was added around 1715, and the complex was upgraded into a fort in the 1790s. In the 1870s, the fort was rebuilt by the British in the polygonal style. Saint Lucian Tower is the second largest watchtower in Malta, after Saint Thomas Tower. Today, the tower and fort are used by the Malta Aquaculture Research Centre.

== History ==
=== Tower and battery ===
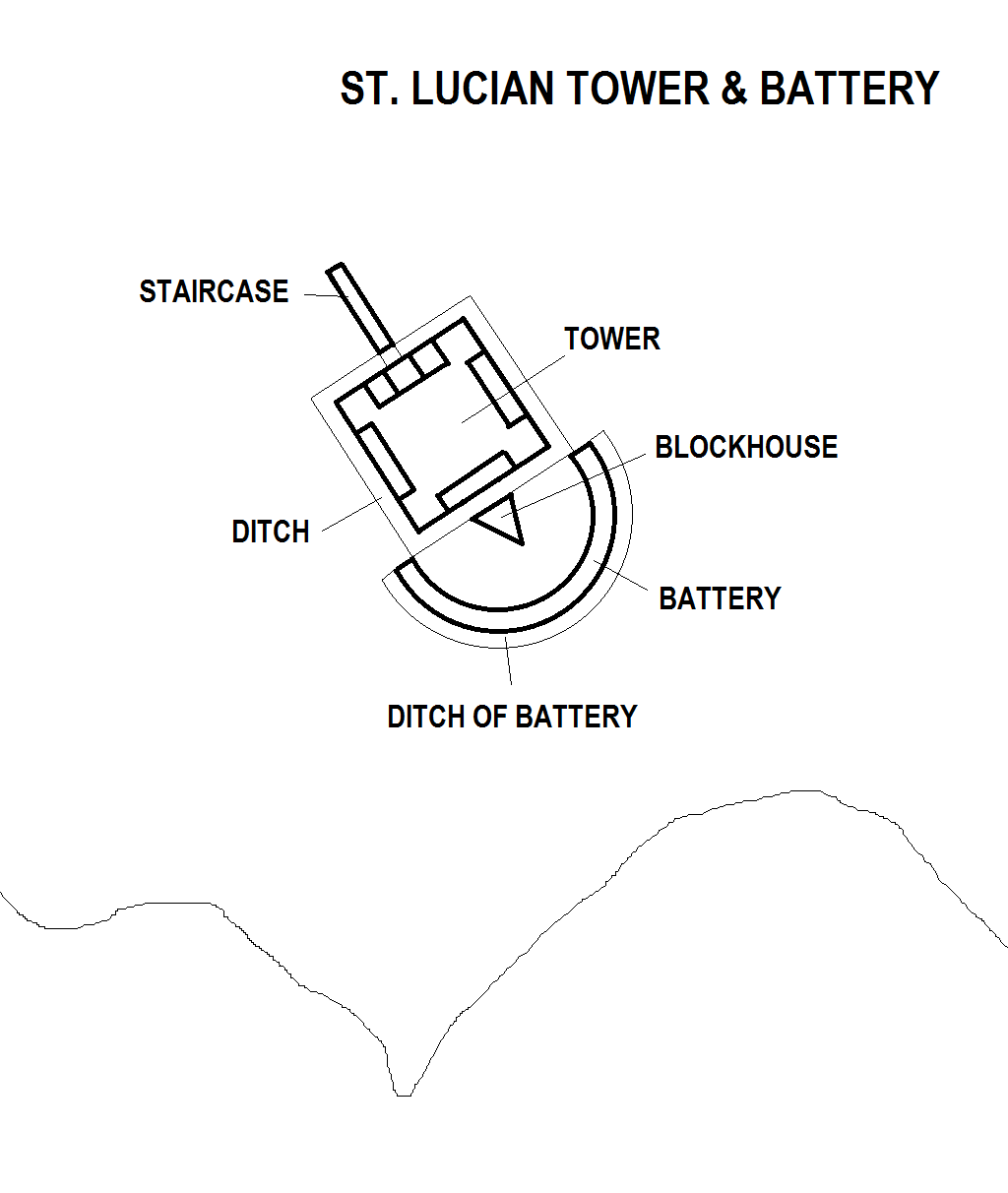
Map of St. Lucian Tower and Battery in 1715

Saint Lucian Tower was built above the shore of Marsaxlokk Bay on the headland between Marsaxlokk and Birżebbuġa. According to local legends, a woman is said to have had a dream in which St. John advised her to tell the Grand Master to fortify the area around Marsaxlokk since an Ottoman attack was imminent. The woman told the parish priest, who told the bishop who in turn told Grand Master Alof de Wignacourt. The Grand Master did not give any importance to this, but that summer an attack really happened. Therefore, Wignacourt ordered the construction of St Lucian Tower, which was eventually built between 1610 and 1611. The cost of construction was 11,745 scudi, 2 tari and 6 scudi. The tower was named after a church in France in which Wignacourt had been baptized.

The tower's design is very similar to the Wignacourt Tower in St. Paul's Bay, but on a larger scale. A flight of steps led to the tower, but this was later demolished by the British. There are claims that it was designed by Vittorio Cassar, but these are disputed since Cassar was probably dead when work on the tower began.

Saint Lucian Tower first saw action in July 1614, when it fired its guns on an Ottoman fleet attempting to disembark at Marsaxlokk Bay. The Ottomans left and landed in St. Thomas Bay, and pillaged some towns and farmland before being forced to retreat by the militia. This event is known as the raid of Żejtun.

The tower was originally armed with 6 cannons, as well as ammunition and other armaments. A small chapel was located within its walls, and it had a titular painting depicting the Martyrdom of St Lucian. The painting was relocated to the parish church of Tarxien in 1799. After the De Redin towers were constructed, St Lucian had Delimara Tower and Bengħisa Tower in its line of sight, but both of these have since been demolished.

A semi-circular battery with an arrow-shaped blockhouse was added to the tower in 1715.

=== Fort Rohan ===
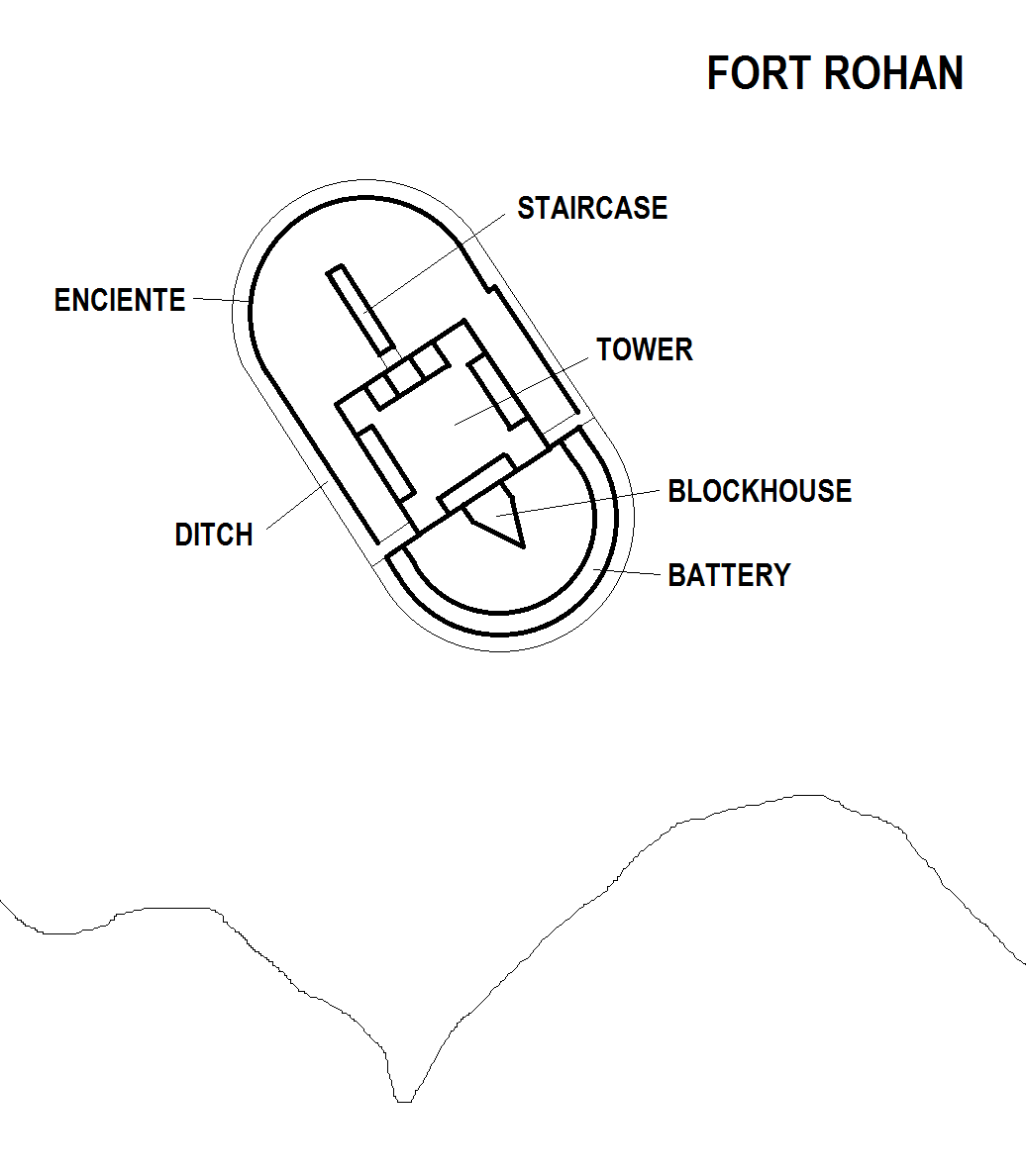
Map of Fort Rohan as completed in 1795

Between 1792 and 1795, the tower and battery were surrounded by a ditch and enclosed within an entrenchment-like enclosure. This was designed by the engineer Antoine Étienne de Tousard, and the complex was renamed Fort Rohan after the reigning Grandmaster, Emmanuel de Rohan-Polduc.

During the French invasion of Malta in 1798, Fort Rohan, then commanded by the knight Laguérivière, was one of the few forts that offered strong resistance to the invading forces. After the Order left Malta, the name "Fort Rohan" fell into disuse and the tower began to be referred to as "St Lucian Tower" or "Fort St Lucian" once again.

=== Entrenchment and redoubt ===
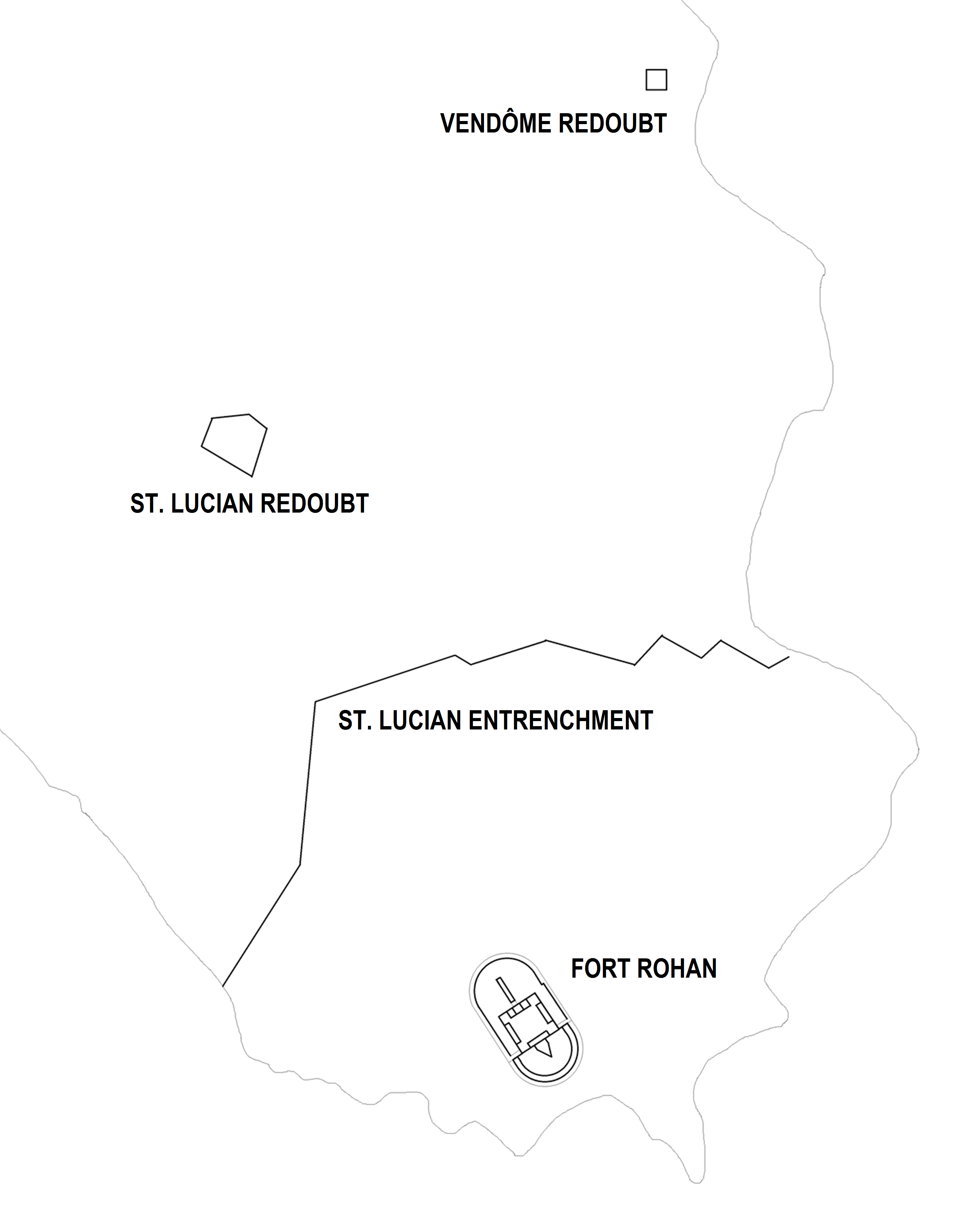
Map of St. Lucian Entrenchment and Redoubt, in relation to Fort Rohan and Vendôme Redoubt

During the French blockade of 1798-1800, Fort Rohan was chosen by the British (who were allied to the Maltese insurgents against the French) as a supply base and an evacuation point in the case of the arrival of a French relief force. The plan was that as soon as French reinforcements arrived, British soldiers of the 30th and 89th Regiments of Foot would gather at San Rocco Battery, and retreat to Żabbar under the cover of San Rocco Redoubt. From there, they were to go to Żejtun, and then to Fort Rohan, from where they would embark on their ships in Marsaxlokk Harbour and evacuate the island.

For this purpose, Saint Lucian Entrenchment was built stretching from near Ferretti Battery to Vendôme Redoubt, effectively cutting off the tower's peninsula from the rest of the island. The entrenchment was built in 1799 by the British military with the assistance of the Maltese engineer Matteo Bonavia. A diamond shaped redoubt, known as Saint Lucian Redoubt, was built some distance ahead of the entrenchment, to provide cover for retreating forces. Both the redoubt and the entrenchment were demolished after the blockade, and no traces of them can be seen today.

=== Fort San Lucian ===
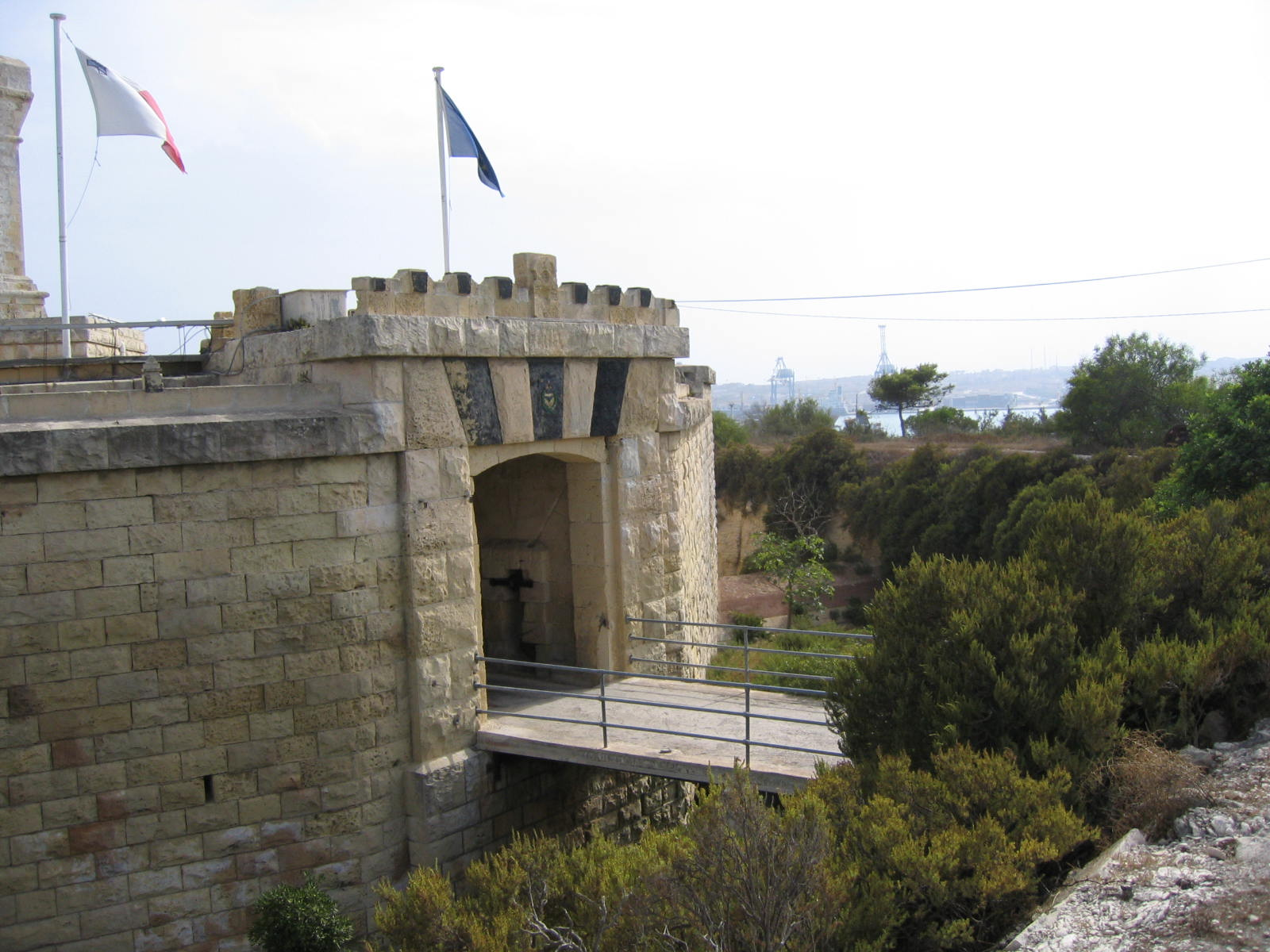
Victorian-era gatehouse and ditch

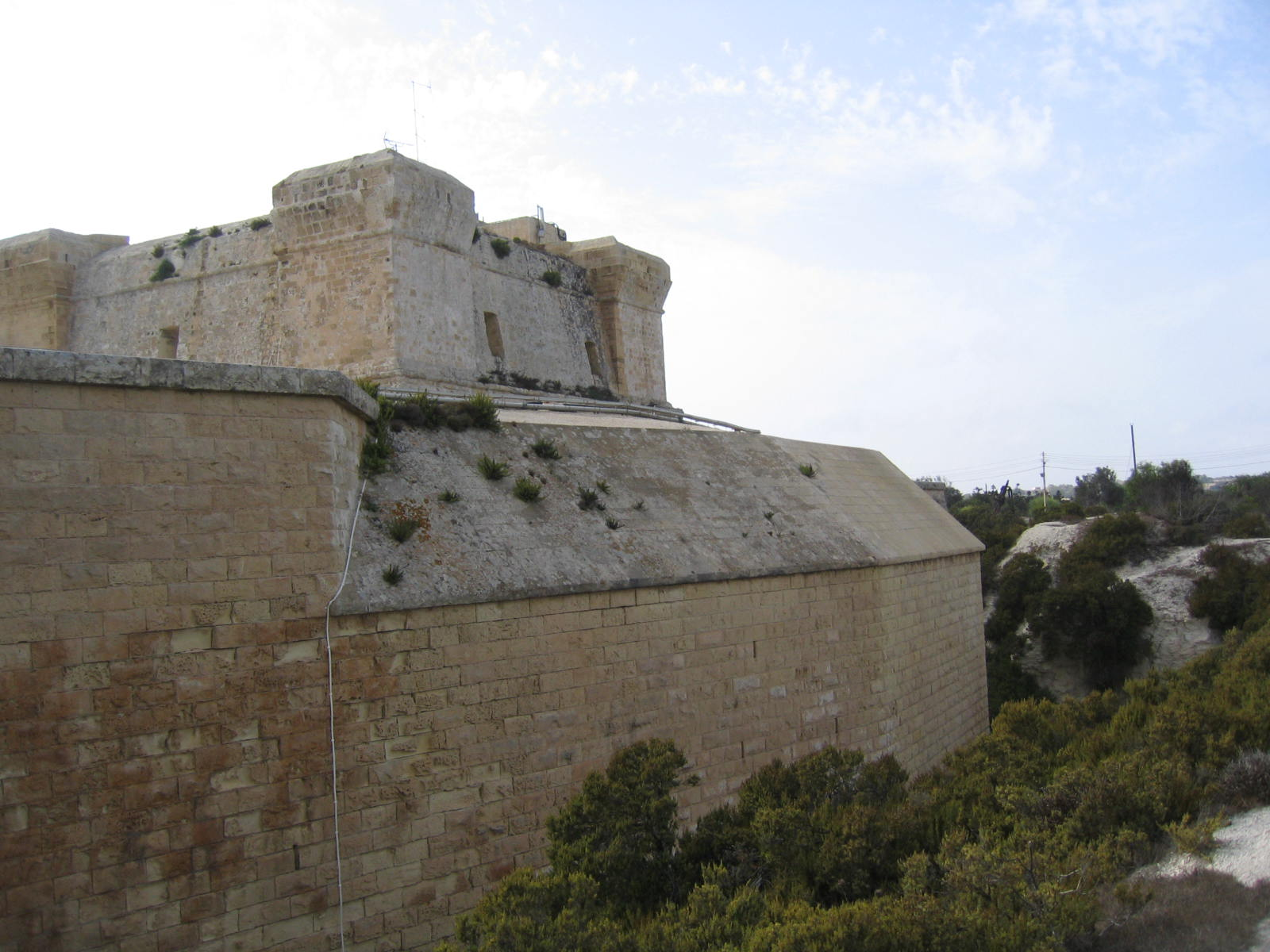
Scarp and ditch of the Victorian-era battery

When Malta fell under British rule permanently, they substantially extended the fort and the original tower now forms the core of a Victorian era fortress. Between 1872 and 1878, the battery, enclosure and the flight of steps leading to the tower were dismantled, and a new polygonal fort was built instead, with the entire installation being renamed Fort Saint Lucian. The fort has caponiers, a sunken gate, and a curved entrance ramp. On the seaward side the tower has been extended to form a low battery, with three large casemates facing out across Marsaxlokk Bay towards Fort Delimara. The fort was equipped with RML 10 inch 18 ton guns. St Lucian formed part of a ring of Victorian fortresses that protected Marsaxlokk Bay which also included Fort Delimara, Fort Tas-Silġ and Fort Benghisa.

The fort was decommissioned in 1885, but was used as a Royal Air Force bomb depot between World War II and the 1960s. Nuclear weapons were also possibly stored at San Lucian during the Cold War. At some points, the fort was also used as a military prison. It was handed to the Government of Malta upon independence in 1964.

The tower was included on the Antiquities List of 1925.

=== Present day ===
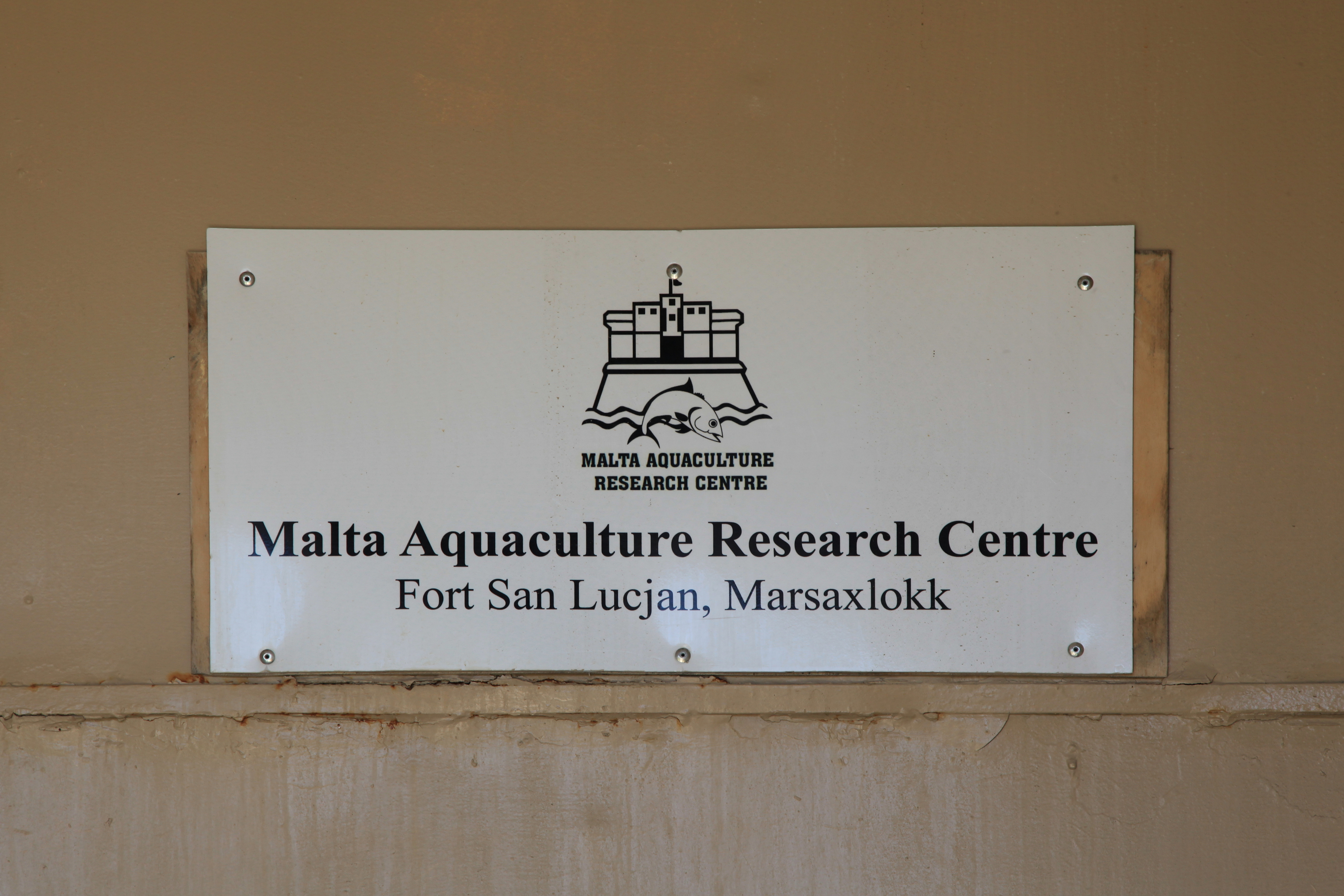
Today the fort houses the Malta Aquaculture Research Centre

After the fort was handed to the government, it was administered by the University of Malta, initially by the Architecture Department and later as a Marine Biology Station. In 1988, it was given to the Ministry of Agriculture and Fisheries to accommodate National Aquaculture Centre, now known as the Malta Aquaculture Research Centre. It remains in the hands of the aquaculture centre to this day, although the government is considering its relocation.

The fort is in generally good condition, although some damage was inflicted on parts of it since its conversion into an aquaculture centre. The ditch is somewhat overgrown, and the casemates are empty, the guns long gone. If the aquaculture centre relocates elsewhere, the fort will possibly be restored and turned into a historical attraction.

The fort and tower are open to the public for individuals or small groups of 2 to 5 people every Saturday morning. Larger groups can make an appointment to visit the fort. As of September 2017 Saturday tours are suspended - no information forthcoming on whether they will recommence.

== In popular culture ==
- The tower is featured in the fiction book Il-Misteru ta' San Luċjan (The Mystery of Saint Lucian) by Charles Casha published in 1997.
- The tower was depicted on a Sovereign Military Order of Malta stamp in 1972, and on a Maltese stamp in 2006.
