= Ferretti Battery =

Artillery battery in Birżebbuġa, Malta

- Batterija ta' Ferretti
- Qajjenza, Birżebbuġa, Malta
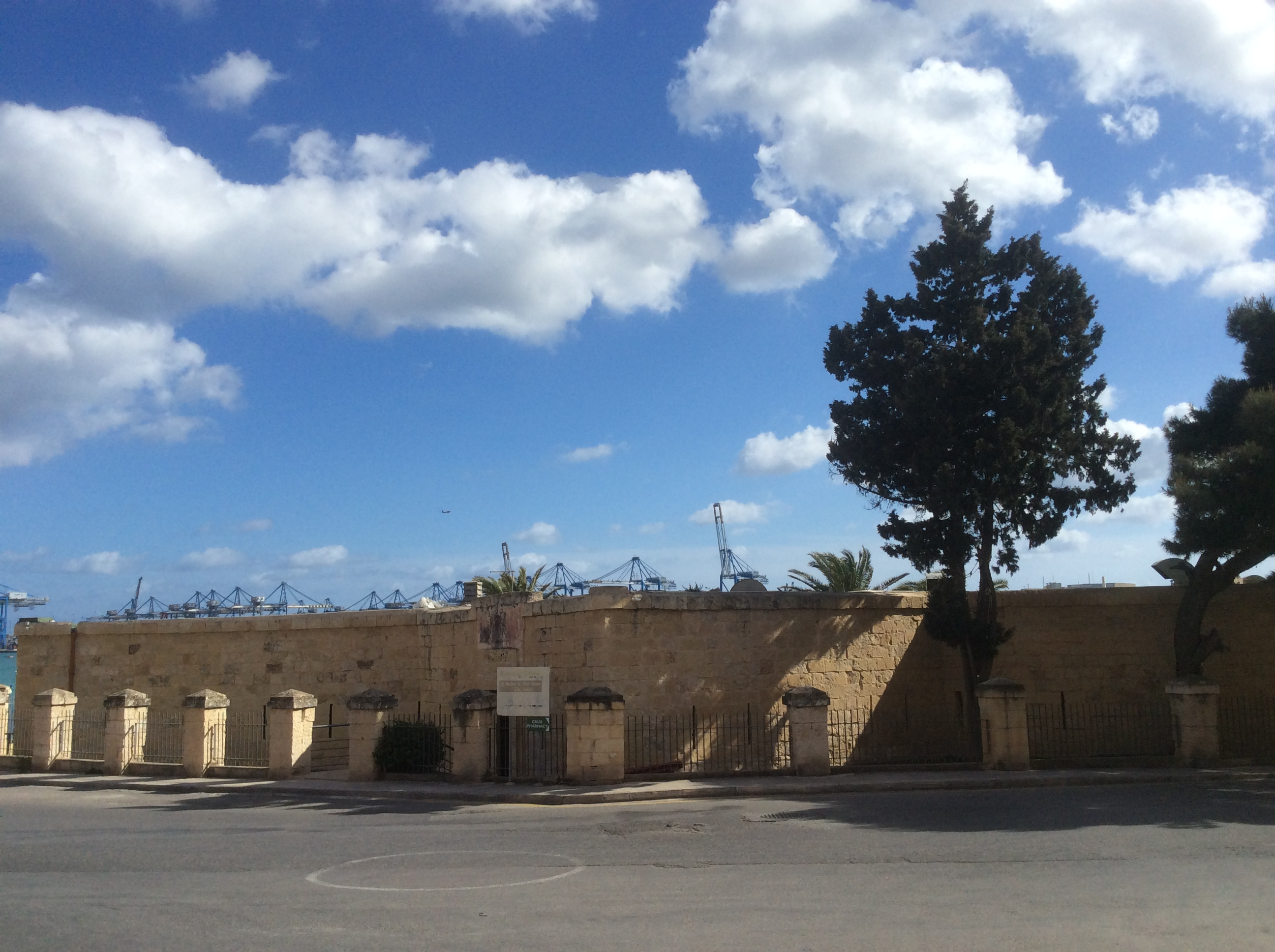
- View of the Ferretti Battery from the landward side, showing the blockhouses and the redan

Site information
- Type: Artillery battery
- Owner: Government of Malta
- Controlled by: Private tenant
- Open to the public: Yes (as a restaurant)
- Condition: Intact
- Website: ferretti.com.mt

Location
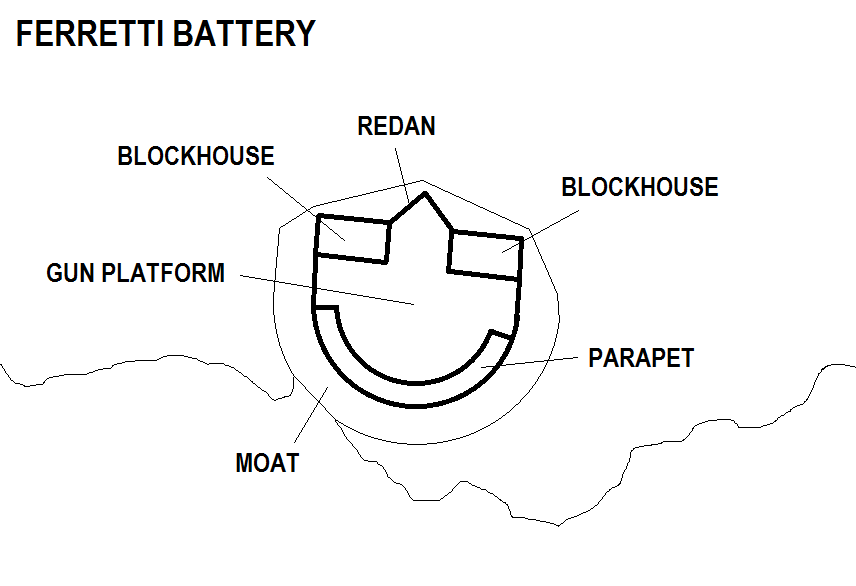
- Map of Ferretti Battery
- Coordinates: 35°49′57″N 14°32′2″E

Site history
- Built: 1715–1716
- Built by: Order of Saint John
- Materials: Limestone

Ferretti Battery (Maltese: Batterija ta' Ferretti), also known as Qajjenza Battery (Maltese: Batterija tal-Qajjenza) or Saint George's Battery (Maltese: Batterija ta' San Ġorġ), is an artillery battery in the village of Qajjenza, within the limits of Birżebbuġa, in Malta. It was built by the Order of Saint John in 1715 and 1716 as one of a series of fortifications around the coasts of the Maltese Islands. A restaurant exists within the walls of the battery, serving Mediterranean cuisine.

== History ==
Ferretti Battery was built in 1715-16 as part of the first building programme of coastal batteries in Malta. It was part of a chain of fortifications that defended Marsaxlokk Bay, which also included six other batteries, the large Saint Lucian Tower, two smaller De Redin towers, four redoubts and three entrenchments. The battery was named after the knight Francesco Maria Ferretti, who provided over 900 scudi for its construction.

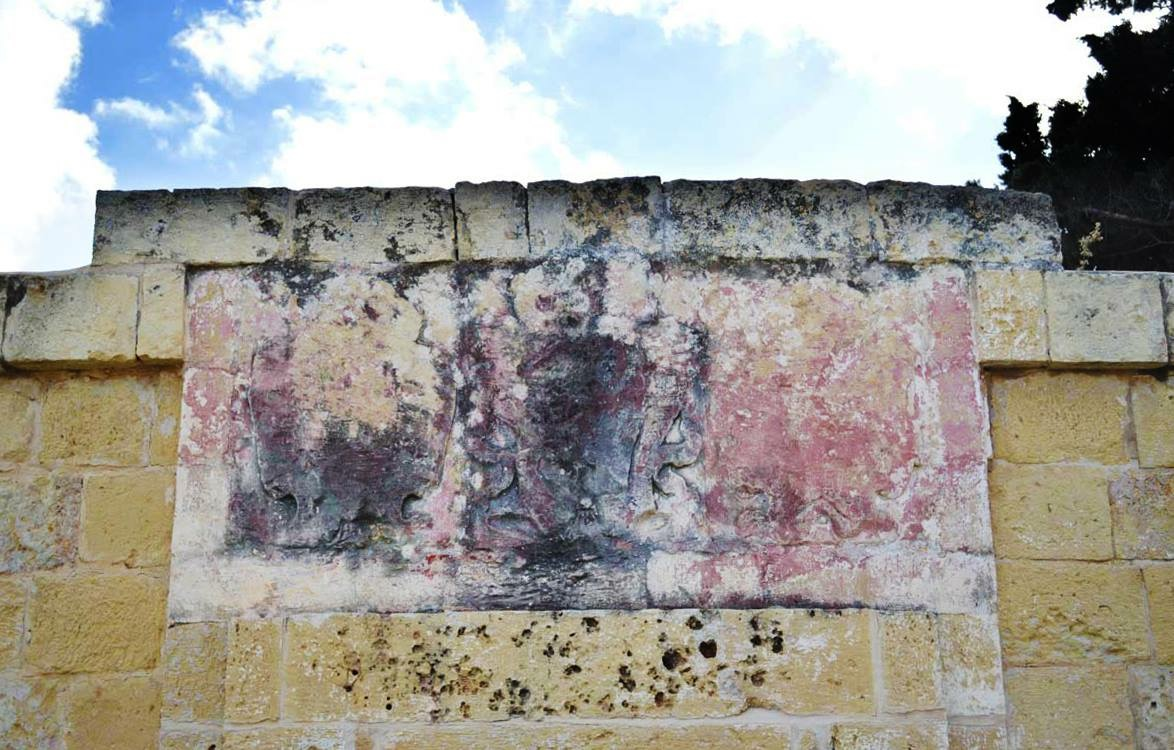
Defaced coats of arms above the battery's main entrance

The battery consists of a semi-circular gun platform, with a parapet containing eight embrasures. Its gorge has two blockhouses linked by a redan, all of which are pierced by musketry loopholes. The redan contains the main entrance, which was surmounted by three coats of arms, now defaced. The battery was formerly covered by a shallow rock hewn ditch.

The battery was decommissioned sometime in the 19th century, and was later converted into a summer residence and a boathouse. The parapet with embrasures was demolished, while the ditch was converted into a moat filled with seawater. A high seawall was built around the battery.

== Present day ==
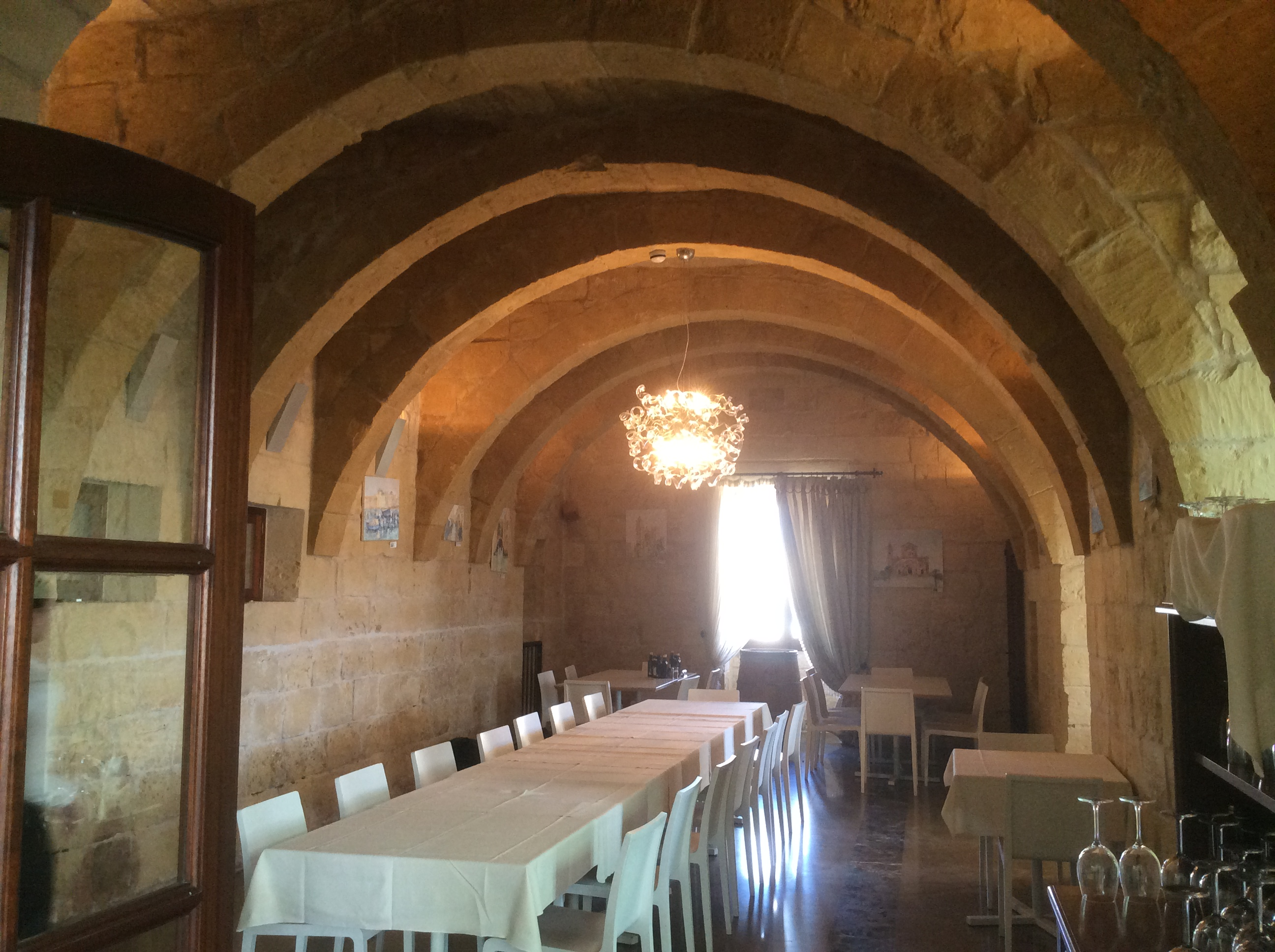
Interior of the restaurant

Today, the battery is used as a restaurant, named Ferretti after the knight who built the battery. The restaurant serves typical Mediterranean cuisine, and is one of the most popular restaurants in the south of Malta.

The structure itself is in a fair state of preservation. Some of the missing embrasures have been rebuilt, and despite some modern alterations, the structure still retains most of its features.

== Gallery ==
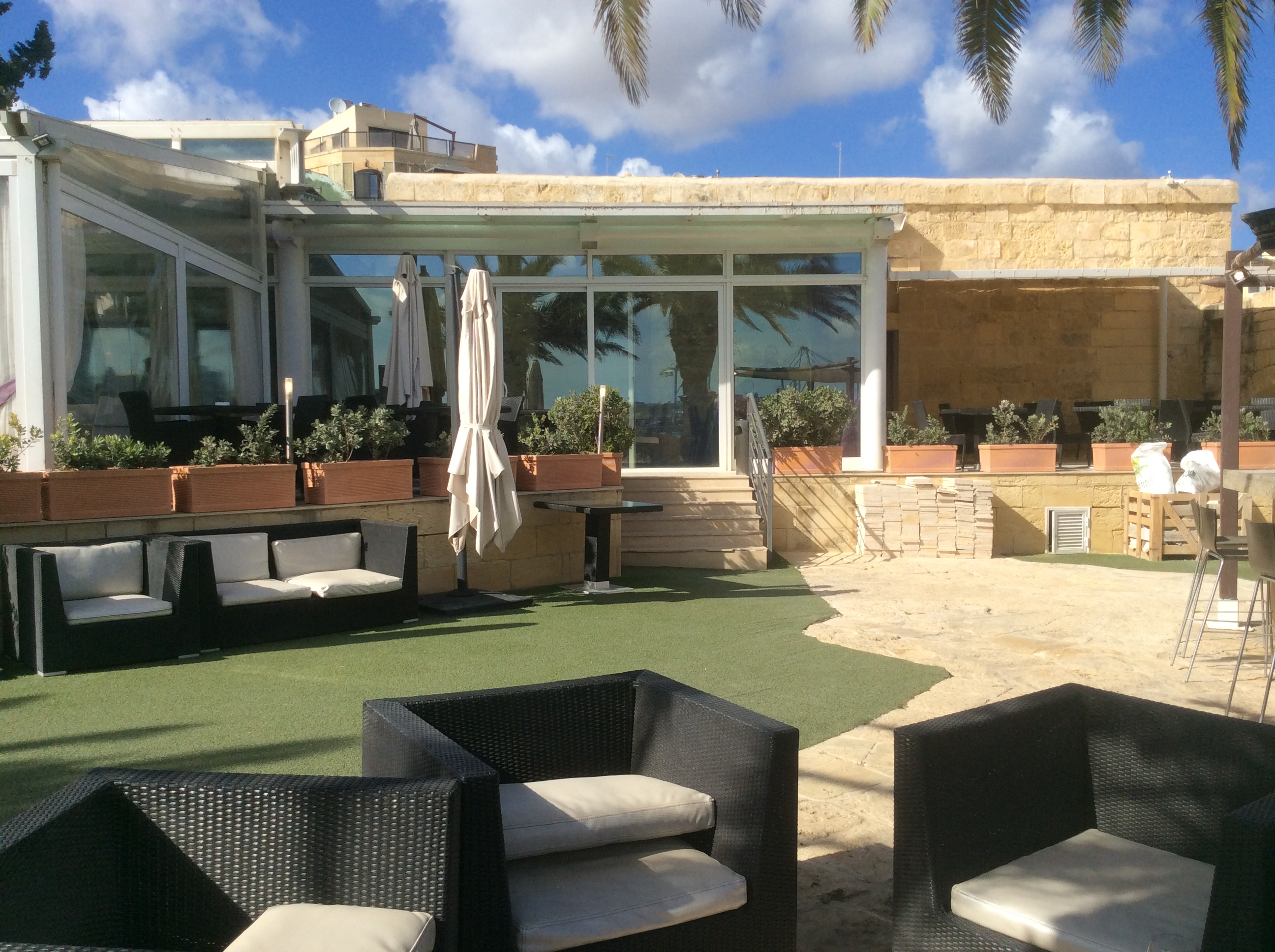
The gun platform, now the restaurant's terrace

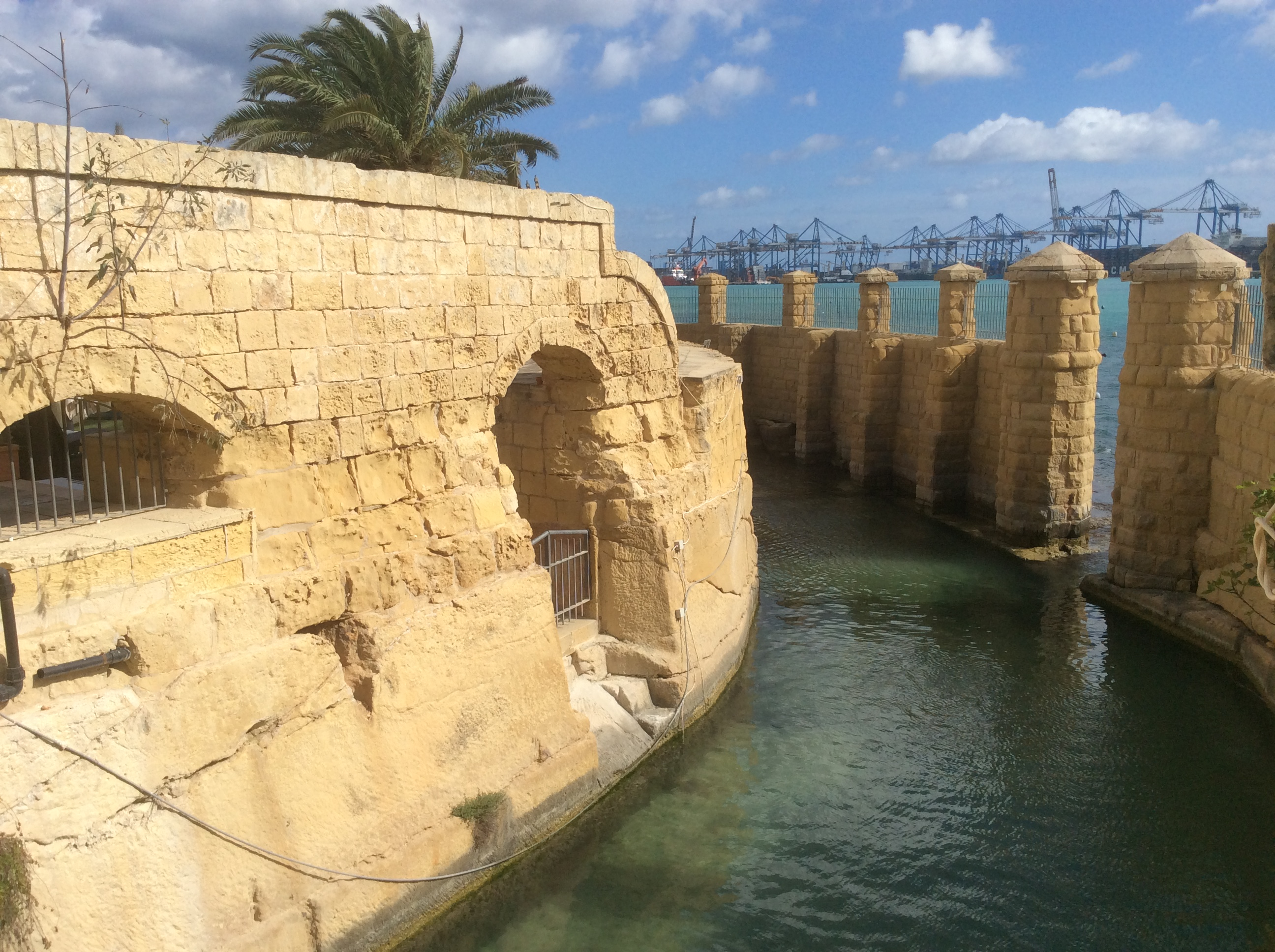
The moat and seawall

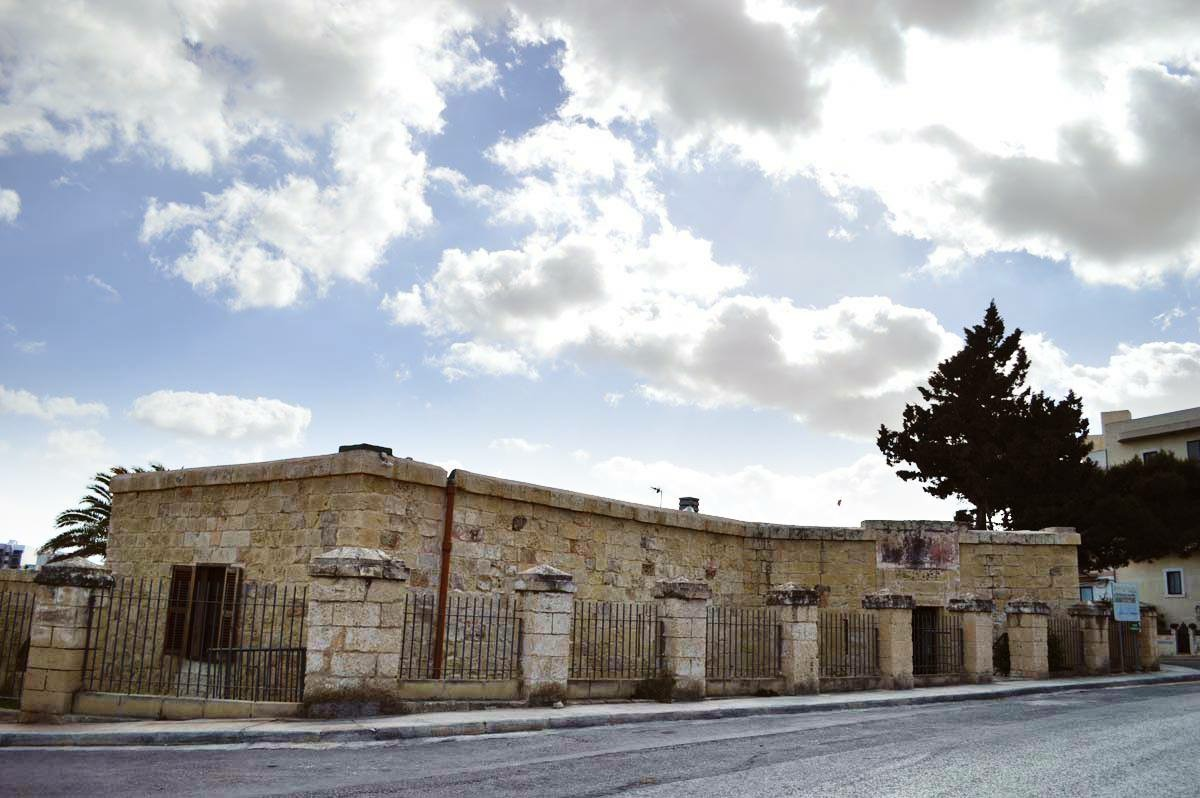
The blockhouse and redan

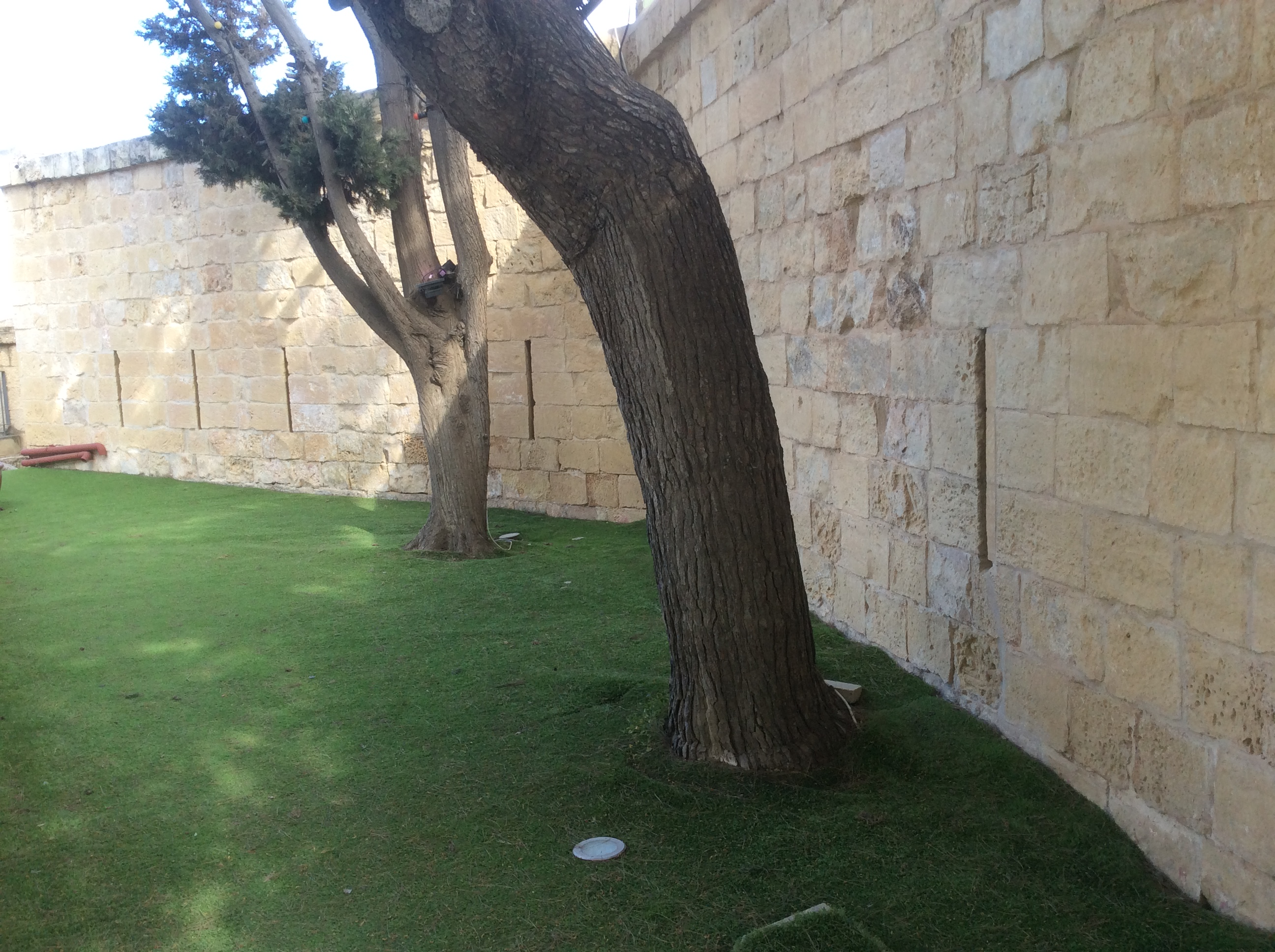
Musketry loopholes

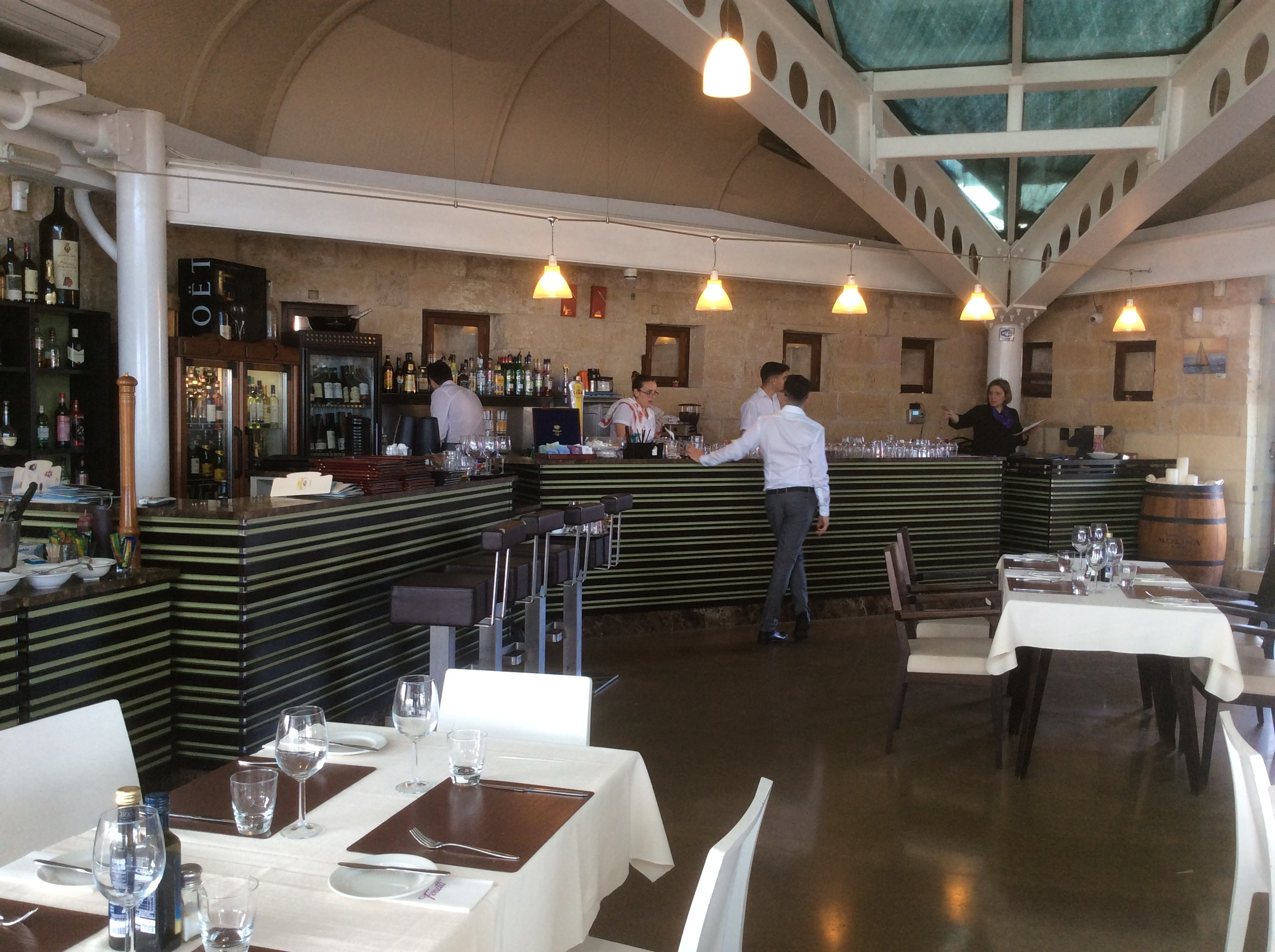
Inside the restaurant with musketry loopholes used as small windows

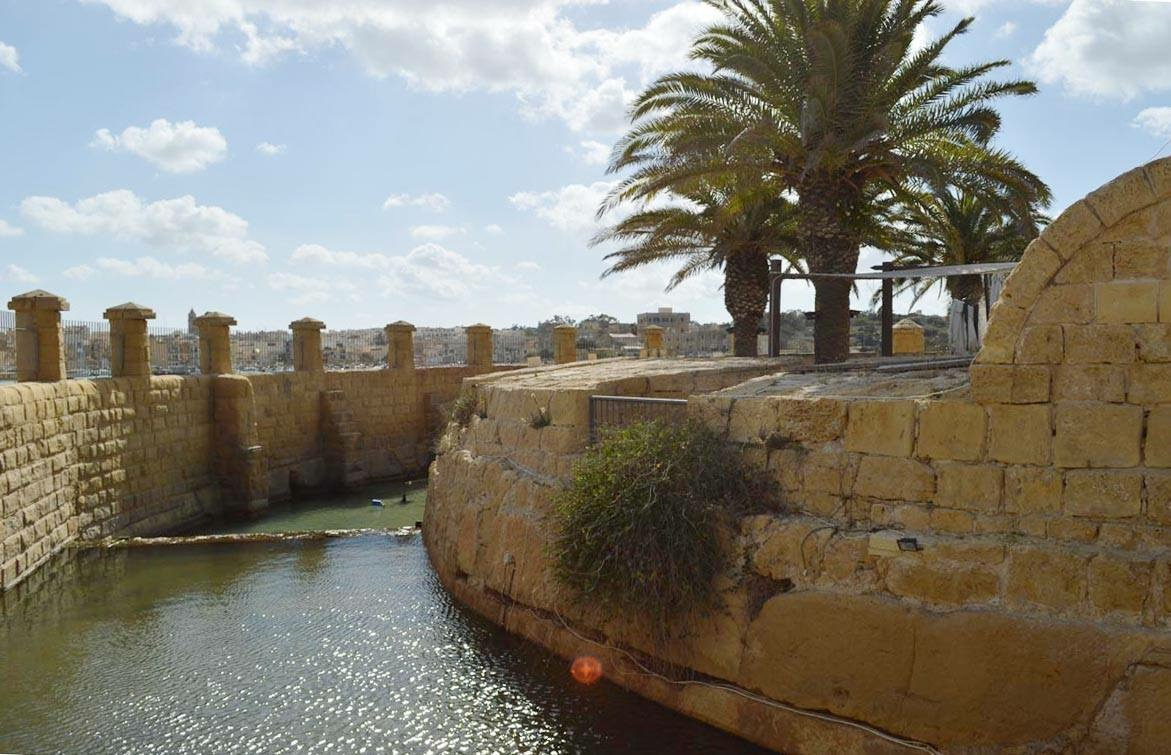
The moat

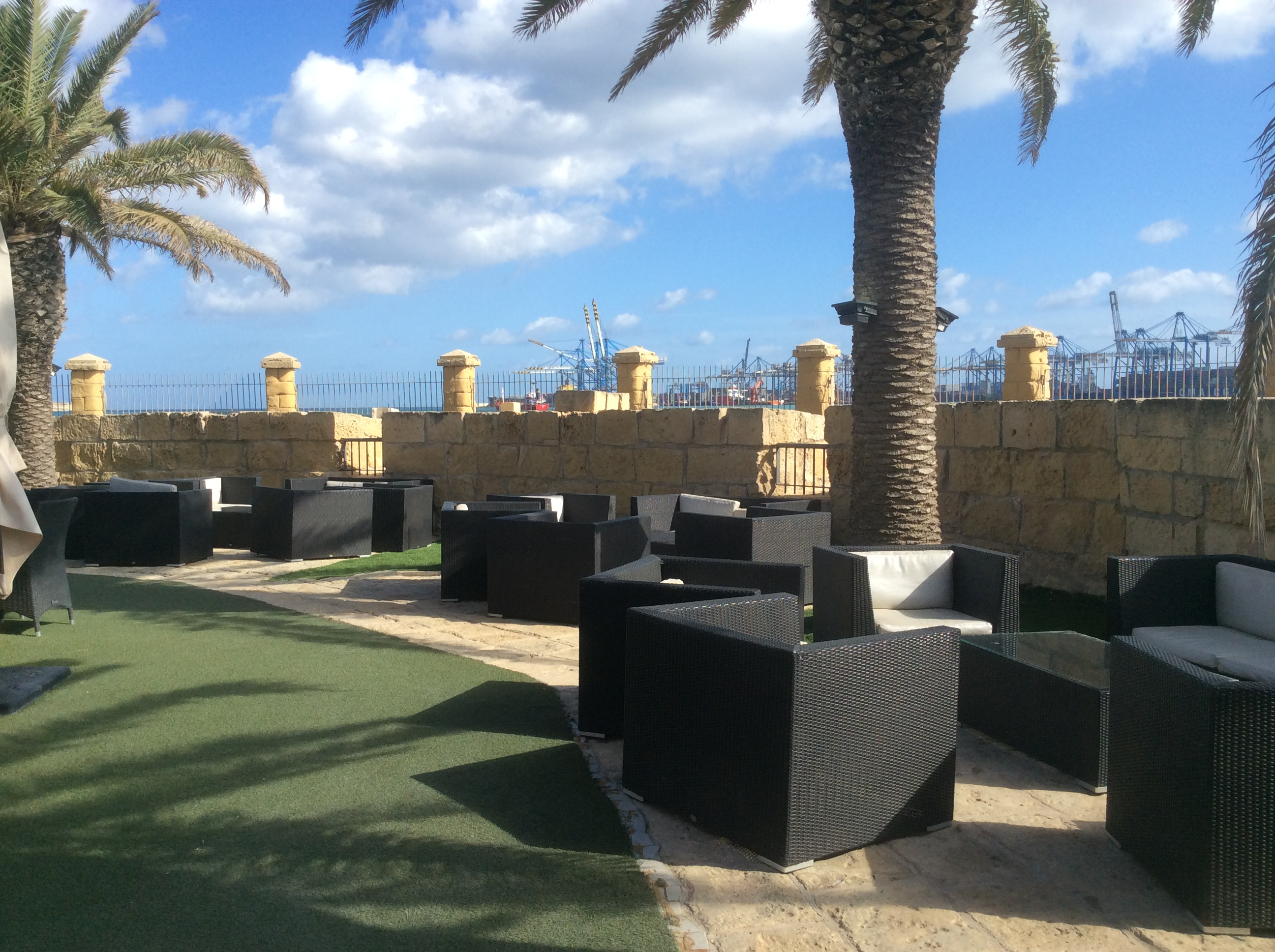
The gun platform and parapet with embrasures

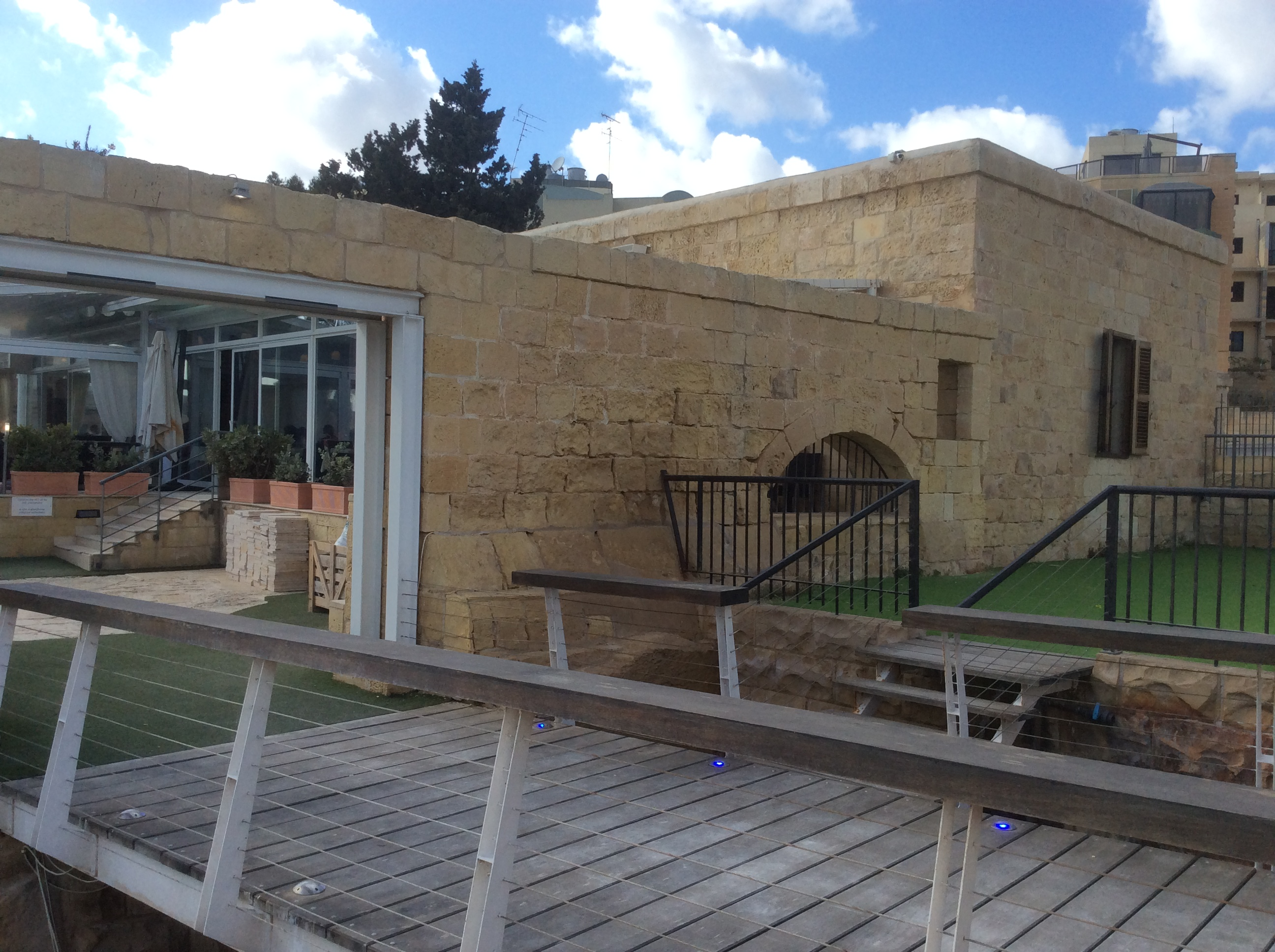
Modern entrance to the restaurant

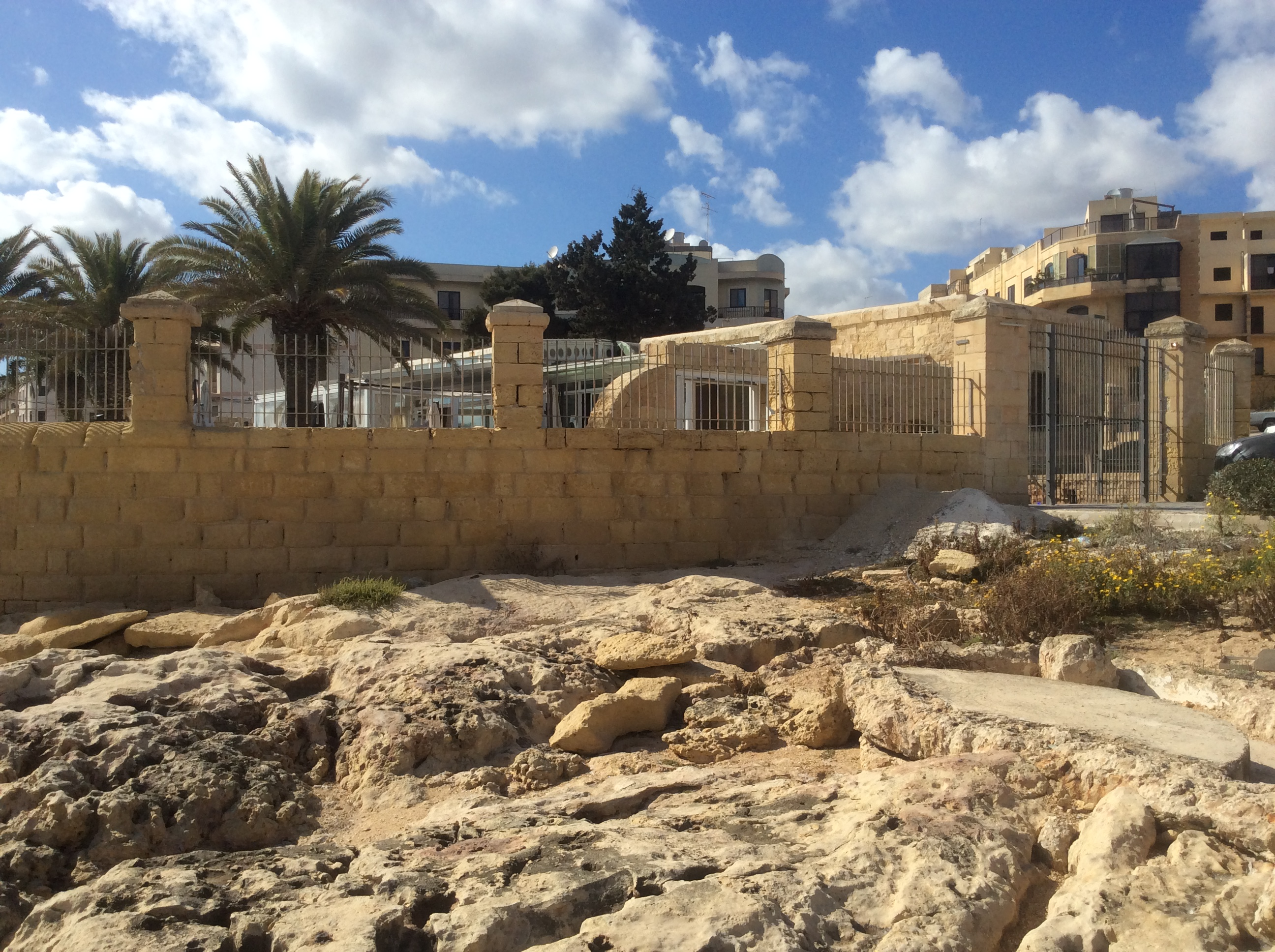
The seawall with the battery in the background

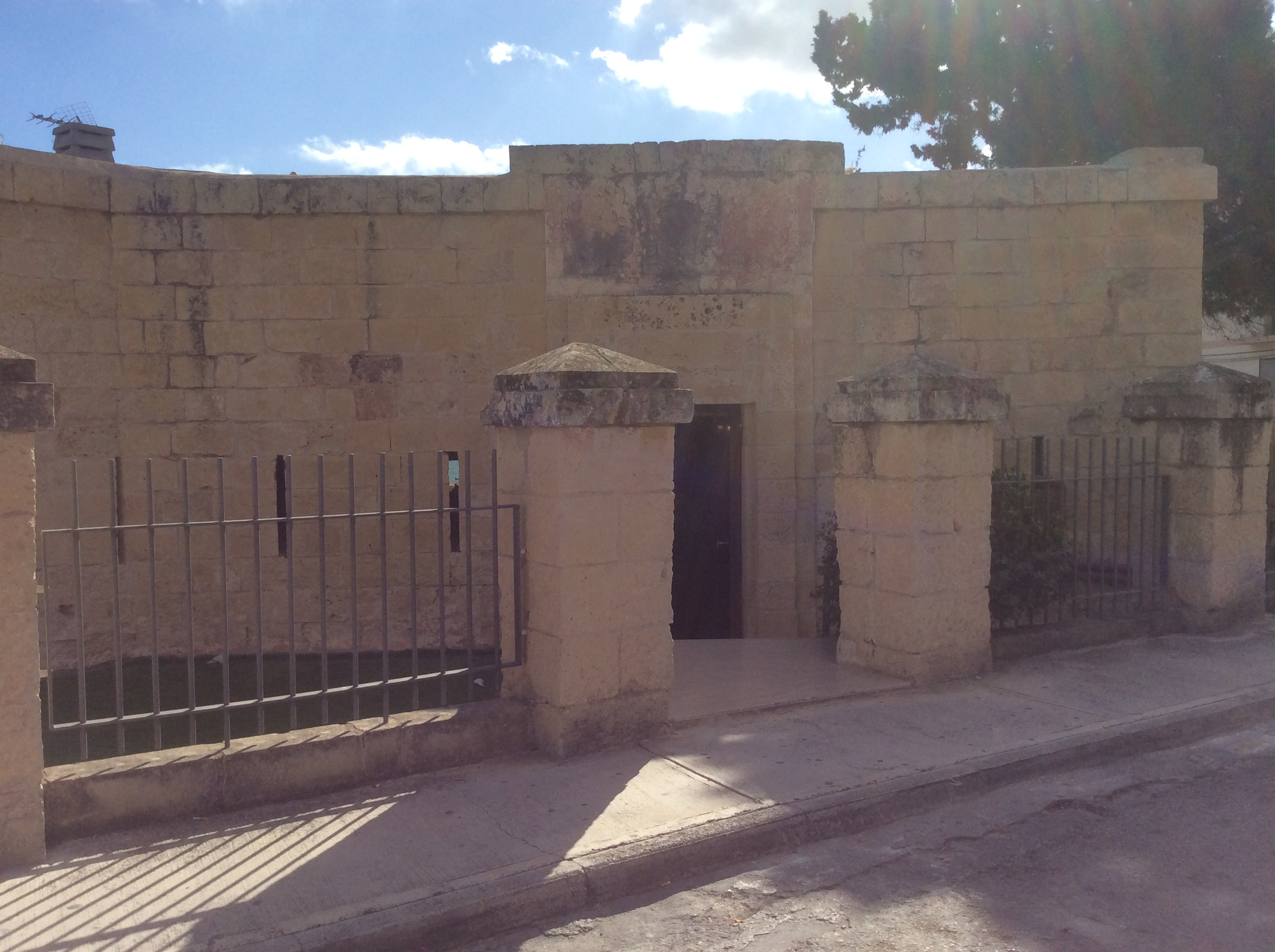
Original entrance to the battery
