= Michele Cachia =

Maltese architect and military engineer (1760–1839)

- Born: 30 September 1760; Żejtun, Hospitaller Malta
- Died: 24 January 1839 (aged 78)
- Occupations: Architect; Military engineer
- Father: Gio Maria Cachia
- Relatives: Antonio Cachia (cousin)
- Military career
- Allegiance: (Sovereign Military Order of Malta) Order of Saint John; Malta
- Branch: Żejtun militia National Congress Battalions
- Conflicts: Siege of Malta (1798–1800)

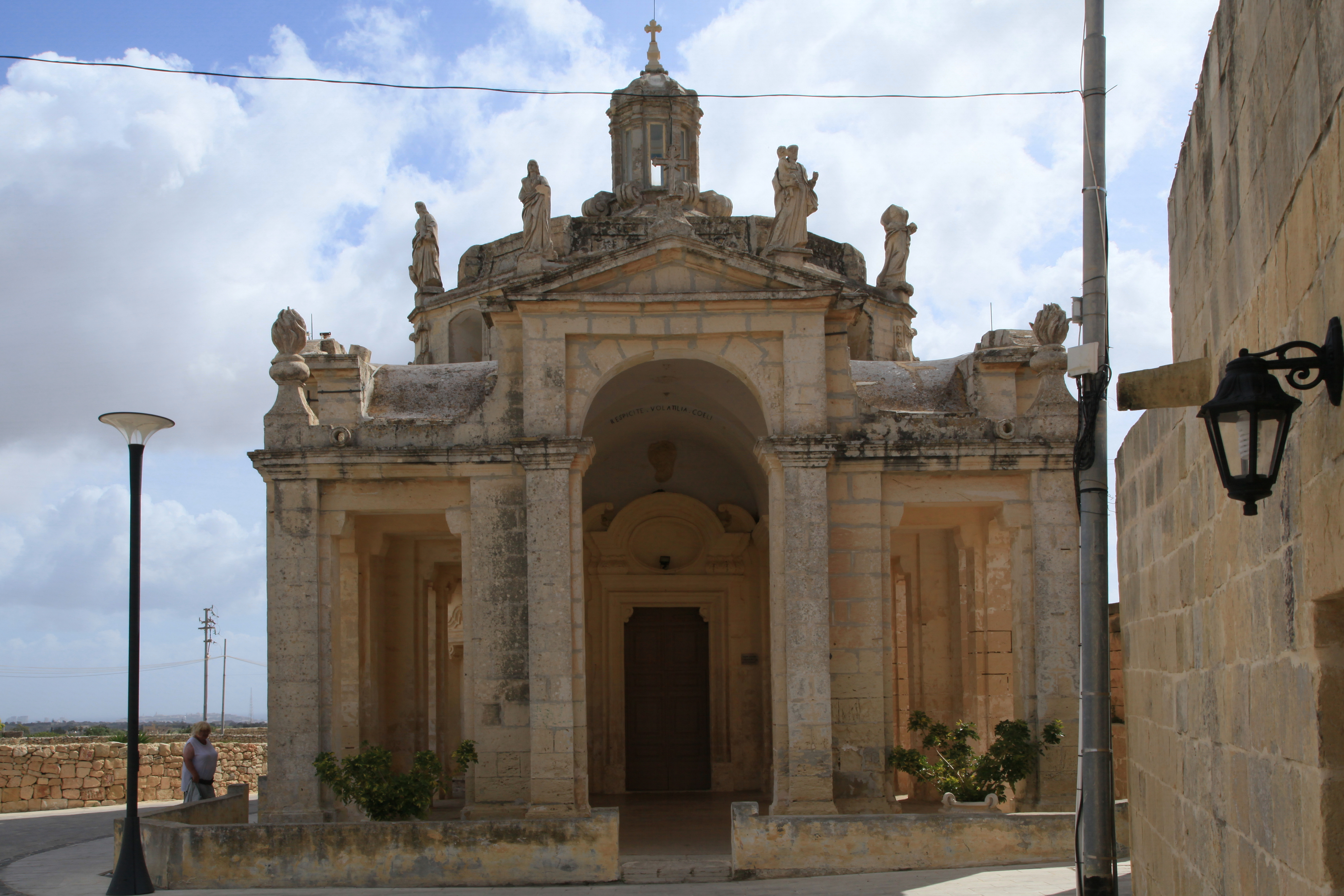
Portico of the Church of Our Lady of Divine Providence in Siġġiewi, which was designed by Cachia in 1815

Michele Cachia (Maltese: Mikiel Cachia; 30 September 1760 – 24 January 1839) was a Maltese architect and military engineer. He is also known for his role during the Maltese uprising of 1798–1800.

== Life ==
Michele Cachia was born on 30 September 1760 in the town of Żejtun, and grew up in a townhouse located at 11, Licata Street. He was the cousin of Antonio Cachia, another architect and engineer. In April 1784, he applied for the post of perito agrimensore. Like his father and grandfather, Cachia also worked in the construction of the Żejtun Parish Church. He was also an adjutant within the Żejtun militia while Malta was ruled by the Order of St. John.

Cachia took part in the Maltese uprising of 1798–1800 against the French occupation of Malta. He designed a number of batteries for the insurgents, including the Corradino Batteries, Tal-Borg Battery and the Żejtun Batteries. In 1799, he also designed a gunpowder magazine at San Rocco Battery.

Between 1801 and 1821, Cachia lived in Floriana, a suburb of the capital Valletta. In 1802, he went to England as part of a delegation of Maltese people.

Cachia was responsible for the construction of the hospital in Rabat, Gozo. His most famous work is the portico of the Church of Our Lady of Divine Providence in Siġġiewi, which he designed after the church was damaged by a lightning strike in 1815. The church had been built in the 18th century to designs of Andrea Belli.

Cachia had a collection of notebooks containing personal notes about property in Valletta. 217 notebooks which contain information about the city in the late 18th and early 19th centuries have survived, and 211 of these were in the personal archive of architect André Zammit after he had discovered them in a house in Lija in around 1990. After Zammit's death in 2020, his family donated the collection of manuscripts including Cachia's work to the National Archives of Malta in 2022.
