= Żejtun Batteries =

Artillery batteries in Malta

- Batteriji taż-Żejtun
- Part of the French blockade batteries
- Żejtun, Malta
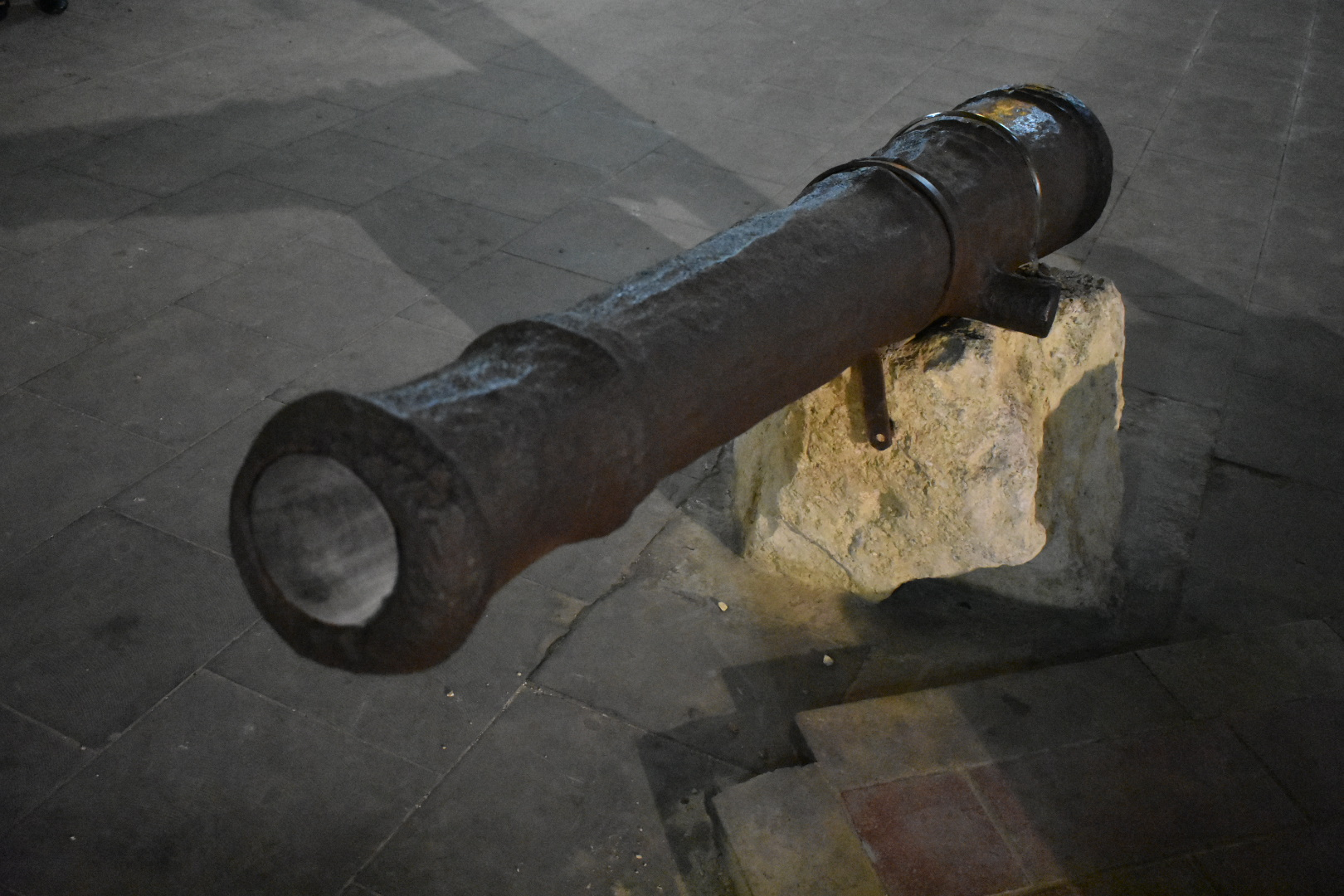
- A cannon used by one of the batteries

Site information
- Type: Artillery batteries

Location
- Coordinates: 35°51′18.6″N 14°32′00.0″E

Site history
- Built: c. 1798
- Built by: Maltese insurgents
- In use: c. 1798–1800
- Materials: Limestone
- Fate: Demolished
- Battles/wars: Siege of Malta (1798–1800)

The Żejtun Batteries (Maltese: Batteriji taż-Żejtun) were a series of artillery batteries in Żejtun, Malta, built by Maltese insurgents during the French blockade of 1798–1800. They were part of a chain of batteries, redoubts and entrenchments encircling the French positions in Marsamxett and the Grand Harbour.

At least six small batteries were built:

- Della Croce Battery: This was located close to the parish church.
- Tal-Caspio Batteries: These were two batteries located close to St. Clement's Church. They were armed with two 8-pounder cannon.
- Tal-Fax Batteries: These were three batteries located close to St. Gregory's Church. They guarded the road to Marsaskala.

The architect Michele Cachia had a leading role in the construction of the batteries.

The Żejtun Batteries, like the other French blockade fortifications, were probably demolished soon after the end of the blockade. No traces of any of the batteries has survived. However, a cannon used in one of the batteries still survives and is now found on the side of the Parish Church of the city, next to the Olive Tree Millennium Monument.
