= San Rocco Battery =

- Batterija ta' San Rokku
- Part of the French blockade batteries
- Kalkara, Malta
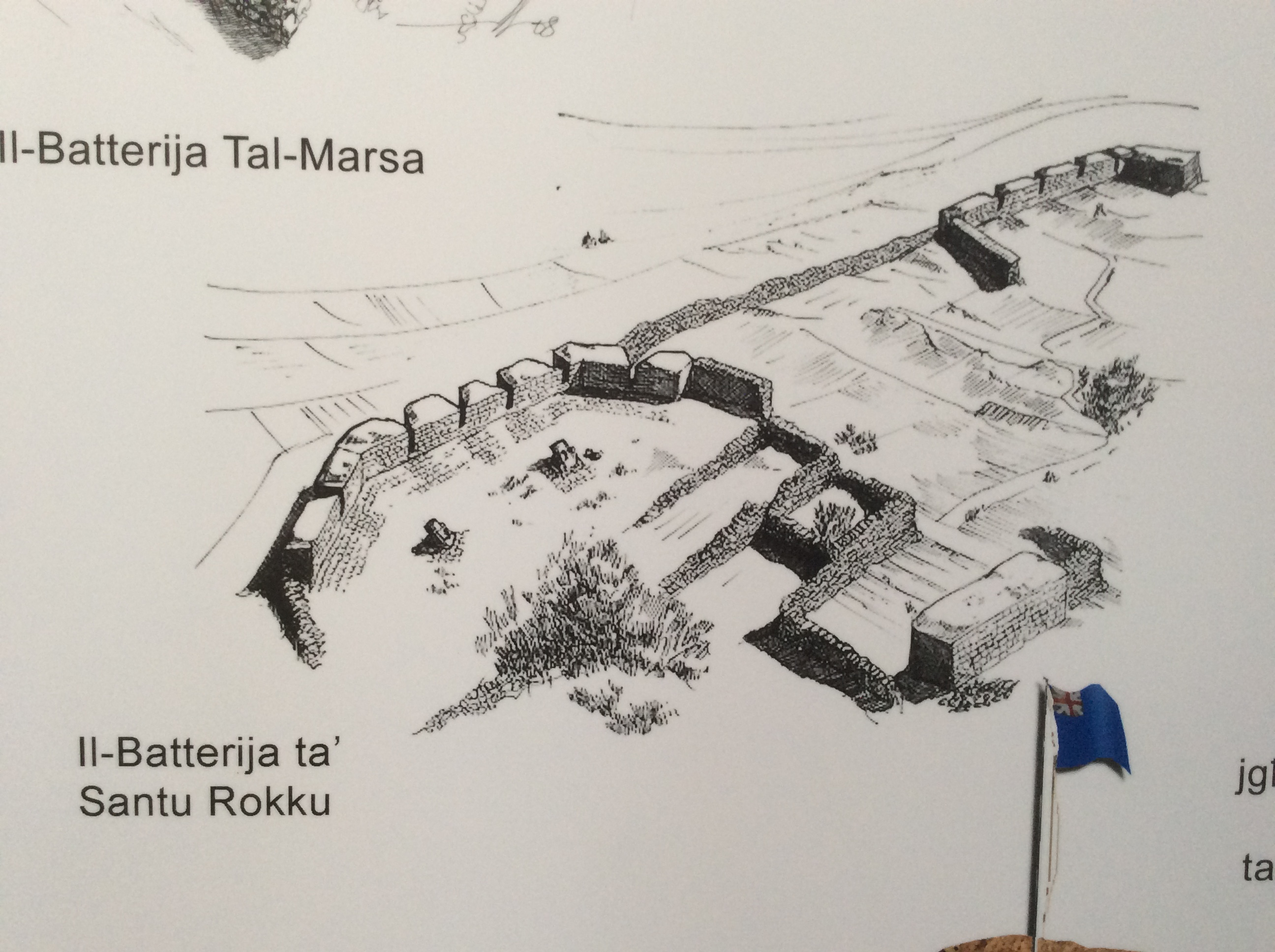
- Reconstruction of San Rocco Battery by Stephen C. Spiteri at the Fortifications Interpretation Centre

Site information
- Type: Artillery battery

Location
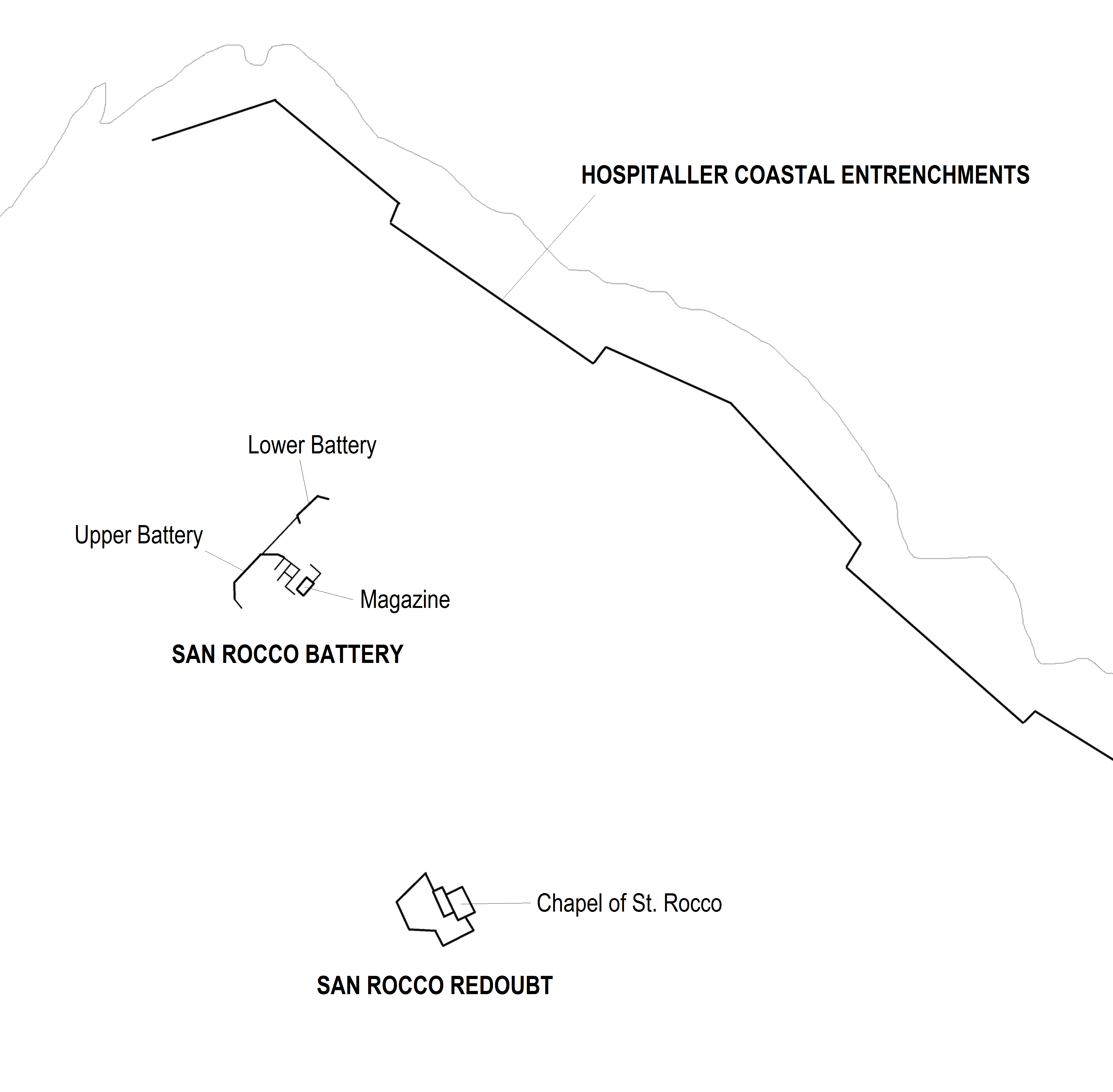
- Map of San Rocco Battery in relation to San Rocco Redoubt and the nearby coastal entrenchments
- Coordinates: 35°53′35.1″N 14°32′14.4″E

Site history
- Built: c. 1798–1799
- Built by: Maltese insurgents
- In use: c. 1798–1800
- Materials: Limestone
- Fate: Demolished
- Battles/wars: Siege of Malta (1798–1800)

Garrison information
- Garrison: National Congress Battalions; 30th (Cambridgeshire) Regiment of Foot

San Rocco Battery (Maltese: Batterija ta' San Rokku) was an artillery battery in Kalkara, Malta, built by Maltese insurgents during the French blockade of 1798–1800. It was the last in a chain of batteries, redoubts and entrenchments encircling the French positions in Marsamxett and the Grand Harbour. It was built to control the entrance to the harbour as well as the French occupied Fort Ricasoli. The battery was continually being fired upon by the French at Fort Ricasoli, which was located about 700 m (2,300 ft) away.

The battery was built on a low hillock and had two gun platforms, which were connected together with rubble walls. Around December 1799, a magazine was built by the architect Michele Cachia at the rear of the battery, with timber beams taken from ruined houses in Paola. The battery was initially armed with two 6-pounder iron guns. During the course of the siege, the armament was increased to five 12-pounders and two 8-pounders on the upper platform, while the lower platform was armed with four 32-pounders for coastal defence. By the end of the blockade in 1800 it had ten guns and two mortars. At one point, men from the 30th (Cambridgeshire) Regiment of Foot were stationed at San Rocco Battery.

In 1799, the British devised an evacuation plan in case a French relief force arrived. British forces were to gather at San Rocco Battery, before retreating to Żabbar under the cover of San Rocco Redoubt. From there, they would retreat to Żejtun, and then to Fort Rohan under the cover of St. Lucian Redoubt. They would embark on their ships in Marsaxlokk Harbour and evacuate the island.

Like the other French blockade fortifications, San Rocco Battery was dismantled, possibly sometime after 1814. No traces of the battery can be seen today. In the 1870s, the British built Fort Saint Rocco on the site of the battery.
