= Storming of Redoubt 10 =

1781 action of Yorktown campaign

- Part of the Siege of Yorktown and the American Revolutionary War
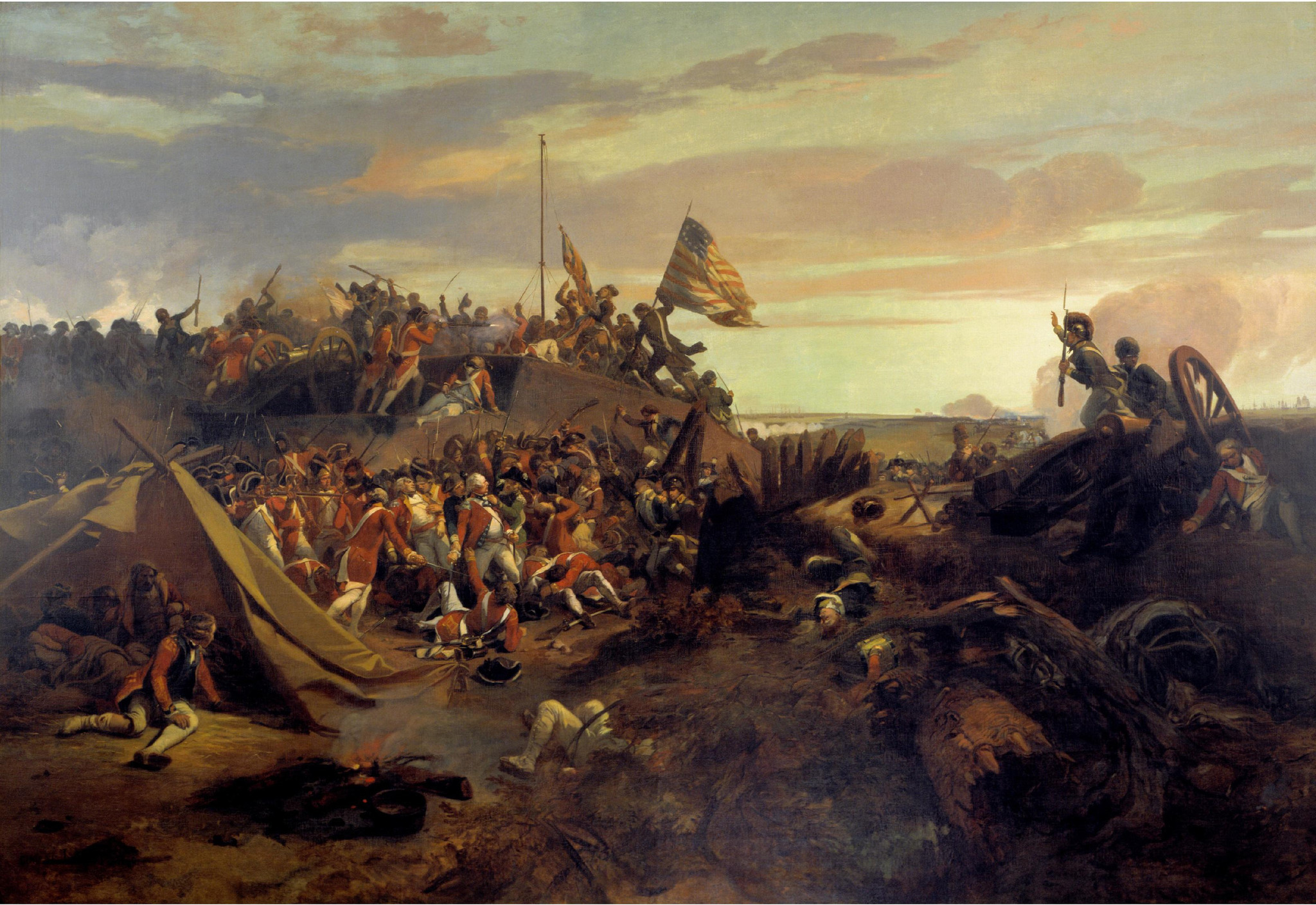
- The storming of Redoubt 10 as painted by Eugène Lami (1840) The storming of Redoubt 10 by Eugène Lami (1840)
Date	October 14, 1781
Location	Yorktown, Virginia,
Result	Allied American victory
Territorial changes	Redoubt 10 captured, allowing completion of the second parallel

Belligerents
(United States) American forces (Supported by French forces)	(United Kingdom) Great Britain; Hesse-Kassel

Commanders and leaders
(United States) Alexander Hamilton (United States) John Laurens	Major James Campbell (garrison commander)

Strength
~400 light infantry (American assault force)	~70 British and Hessian troops

Casualties and losses
9 killed, 25 wounded	8 killed, ~20 wounded, 25 captured

The storming of Redoubt 10 was a major military assault on a British-held fortification known as Redoubt 10, executed on October 14, 1781, during the Siege of Yorktown. During the evening hours, Lieutenant Colonel Alexander Hamilton led a detachment of 400 light infantrymen in an assault on the stronghold, successfully capturing it within ten minutes. Simultaneously, French forces attacked and secured neighboring Redoubt 9. The capture of both positions enabled the allied armies to establish a second siege parallel line, which allowed American and French artillery to bombard the primary British defenses at point-blank range.

== Background ==
In early September the French under Comte de Grasse had blockaded the entrance into the Chesapeake so the British naval force could supply their force when the British fleet had came they had seen and engaged the French fleet and had lost. with that the combined Franco-American force under George Washington and Comte de Rochambeau had successfully trap British general Charles Cornwallis that retreated for to refit and resupply his army, though instead of Washington’s primary plan to retake New York, Rochambeau had planned to attack the British force under Cornwallis Yorktown. To deceive the British force, Washington’s army had created a fake camp with bread ovens and tents in New Jersey acting like they were to attack New York. Then Washington’s army had marched to Yorktown to meet up with Rochambeau. after the Franco-American force set up camp, Washington had the first hit of the soil with that the men had started creating the first parallel around 600-800 yards from Yorktown also building Battery’s,Epaulements, Communication Trenches,Redans, And other smaller trenches.

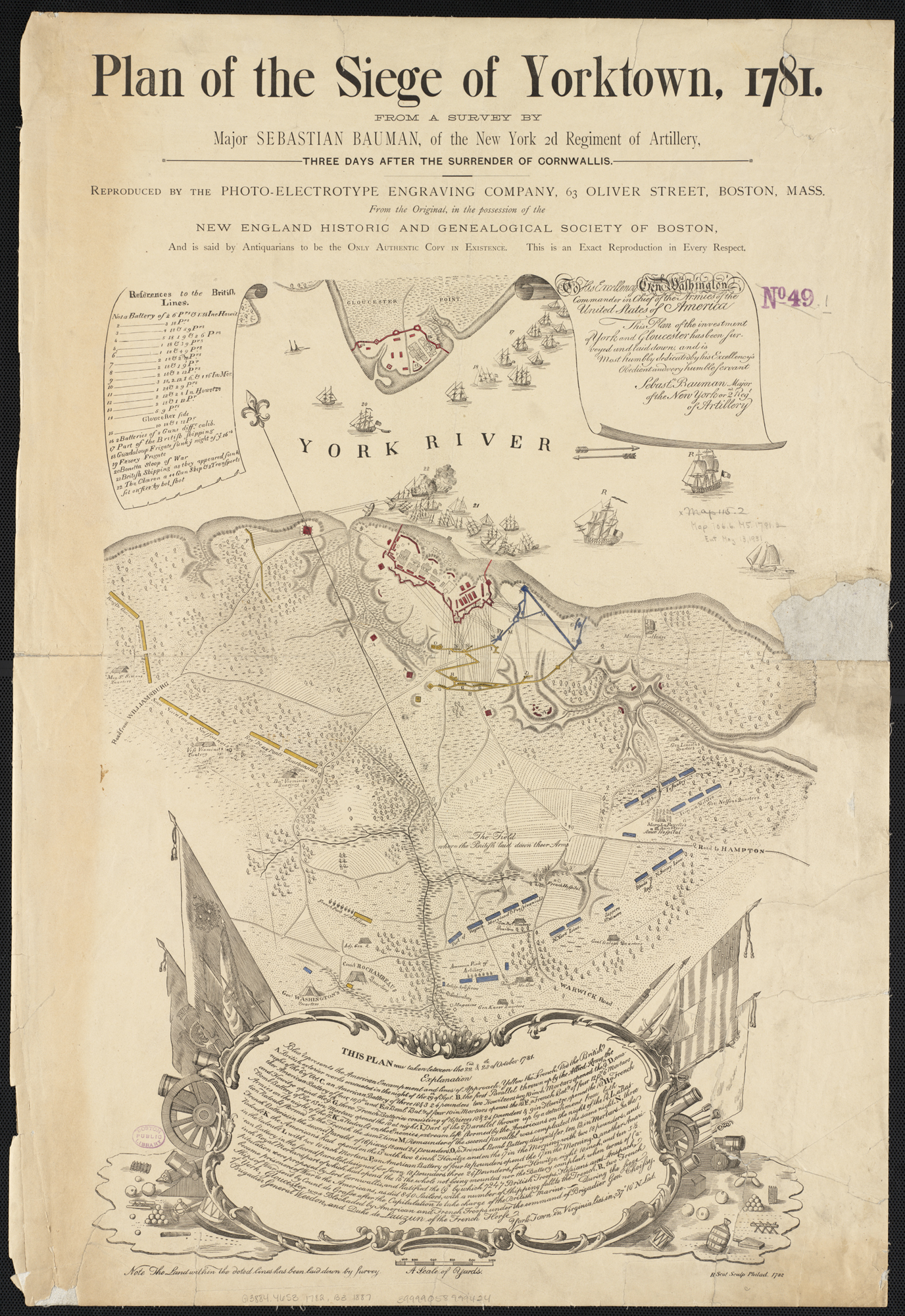
Major Sebastian Bauman's 1782 tactical map showing the first and second siege parallels.

October 9, 1781, the allied artillery batteries along the first parallel were complete, and Washington personally fired the first gun to open a heavy, multi-day bombardment. This continuous fire severely damaged the British fortifications and disabled many of Cornwallis's artillery pieces.With the British lines weakened, Washington ordered troops forward to advance the siege. On the night of October 11, allied soldiers secretly began digging a second parallel trench just 360 yards from the British positions. While the men successfully dug the trench to a depth of over three feet, construction was abruptly halted on the far right flank. Two detached British fortifications—Redoubt No. 9 and Redoubt No. 10—stood directly in the path of the trench line, blocking it from reaching the York River to complete the encirclement

== Assault ==
At approximately 8:00 PM on October 14, 1781, the firing of six consecutive Allied artillery shells into the night sky signaled the commencement of the assault. Utilizing the cover of total darkness on a moonless night, the 400 light infantrymen under the command of Lieutenant Colonel Alexander Hamilton rose from their advanced trenches and began a silent, disciplined march across No Man's Land toward the fortification. To maintain the necessary element of surprise and prevent a premature alert, Hamilton enforced a strict mandate requiring all troops to advance with completely unloaded muskets, relying exclusively on fixed bayonets for the attack. The column advanced in complete silence, broken only by the muffled sounds of footsteps moving over the open terrain. As the leading edge of the American column approached the perimeter defenses of Redoubt 10, a specialized vanguard consisting of "forlorn hope" volunteers rushed ahead equipped with axes.

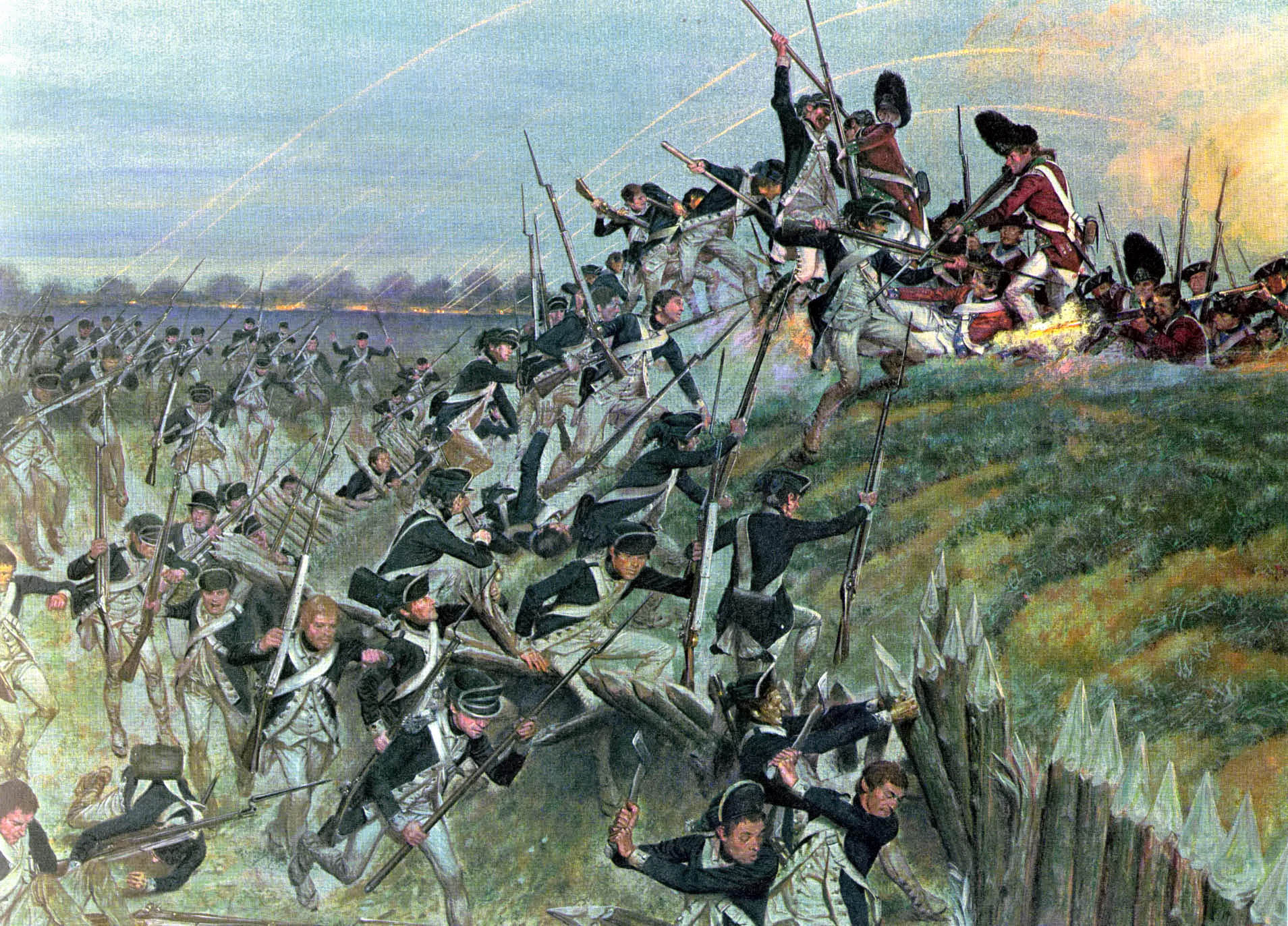
The attack on the redoubt

Their objective was to chop a breach through the fraises—heavy, sharpened wooden stakes projecting horizontally out from the earthen walls—and the abatis, which were dense barriers constructed from felled trees with sharpened branches facing outward toward attackers. The sound of axes striking the wooden fortifications immediately alerted the British sentries on the parapet. The garrison quickly organized a defensive line and opened fire, unleashing a heavy volley of musket fire and throwing hand grenades down into the dark field toward the source of the noise. Rather than ordering his men to halt or wait for the sappers to completely clear a path through the interlocking wooden obstructions, Hamilton made the tactical decision to bypass the bottleneck. He ordered his main infantry columns to surge directly over the sharpened stakes and abatis. The soldiers scrambled over the sharp wooden barriers, threw themselves down into the surrounding dry ditch, and immediately began climbing the steep, vertical dirt walls of the earthen parapet. Hamilton himself utilized the shoulders of a soldier to scale the wall, arriving among the first wave of troops to breach the interior of the earthworks.

== Aftermath ==
Following the hard fought French side of the assaults on the redoubts, Allied combat engineers and laborers had worked through the night to construct the second parallel allowing for the artillery and mortars to reach the walls and garrison of Yorktown after a heavy barrage from the allied artillery and a attempted escape to Gloucester point Cornwallis had surrendered to the allies on the 17th and the official ceremony on the 19th though Cornwallis had faked sickness to surrender his sword but both rochambeu and Washington both denied. and the garrison at Gloucester point surrendered 1 hour later. A account from famous British Calvary commander is as follows

The ground was completely enfiladed by the enemy's batteries... our fortifications were tumbling to pieces under a fire that could not be answered. The troops were worn down by constant watching and unremitted fatigue. [...] When the shipping was scattered by the storm on the night of the sixteenth, all expectations of succor or escape vanished. The infantry were obligated to stand by their arms on the ruined parapets, awaiting an assault they had no means to repel. Under these circumstances, further resistance would have been a wanton sacrifice of brave men.

— Lieutenant Colonel Banastre Tarleton, A History of the Campaigns of 1780 and 1781 in the Southern Provinces of North America (1787)
