= Manikata =

Manikata Manikata
- Village
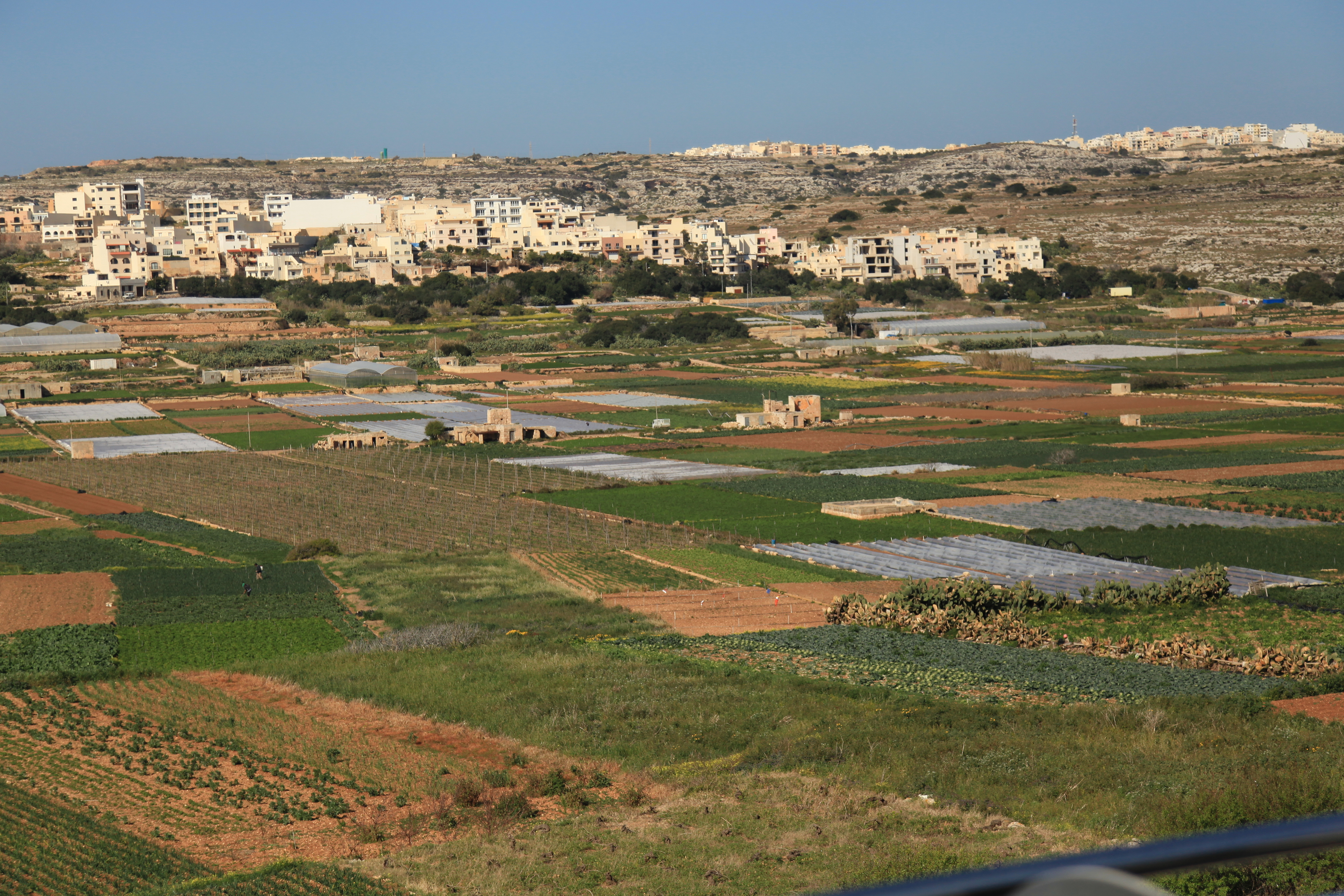
- View of Manikata

- Location within Malta
- Coordinates: 35°56′25″N 14°21′12″E

Government
  - Body: Mellieha Local Council

Area
  - Land: 9.66 ha (23.9 acres)

Dimensions
  - Length: 0.25 km (0.16 mi)
  - Width: 0.77 km (0.48 mi)
- Demonym: Manikatiżi

Manikata is a small settlement in the limits of Mellieħa in the northwestern part of Malta. It oversees the farming areas in the valley between il-Ballut and il-Manikata. The village's population of 539 is spread among 40 families.

== Farming ==
The main industry of Manikata is farming. The valleys around this village are rich in produce. All year round the fields are tended and the produce is enjoyed by many. Grapes, tomatoes, potatoes, onions, melons (bettiegħ), water melons (dulliegħ), apples, oranges, pomegranates (rummien), strawberries and many other crops are commonly seen in the fields. Also there are many beekeepers in this area.

== Different periods ==
=== Bronze Age ===
A lot of cart ruts are found around Manikata. These probably date to a period between the Bronze Age and the Roman Era. One particular line of cart ruts surfaces from under the trees in the Miżieb area, proceeds towards the parish church and goes towards the cliffs hanging above Mejjiesa Bay.

=== Roman period ===
In the area of Il-Ġnien ta’ Għajn Tuffieħa there are the remains of Roman baths that formed part of a rural villa. Nearer to Manikata there are several Roman tombs. Some of them have been obliterated when people cut across the cliff side to level the ground and make space for their fields. Other tombs are found in caves and have been modified by subsequent cave inhabitants to be used as storage space. Some tombs were used as air-raid shelters during World War Two.

=== The Middle Ages ===
During the Middle Ages, the lands at Għajn Tuffieħa and Manikata were used for the cultivation of crops and fruit trees. Fields belonged to land owners from the capital city, Mdina, and its suburb, Rabat. The farmers usually inhabited the caves in the vicinity. The caves also housed sheep, goats and oxen. People also used to come here to collect fire wood. A night watch was kept over the sea cliffs of Għajn Tuffieħa by men from Mosta forming part of the civil corps called Dejma.

=== The Knights of St. John ===
On 18 May 1565 the Turkish fleet anchored in the bays around Manikata, namely Mejjiesa, Mixquqa (Golden Bay), Għajn Tuffieħa and Ġnejna. The following day it arrived at Marsaxlokk Bay to the South East where Turkish soldiers landed to begin their assault on Birgu, the general headquarters of the Order.

In 1637, Grand Master Lascaris came to Għajn Tuffieħa to lay the foundation stone of Għajn Tuffieħa Tower. Grand Master Lascaris also built other watch towers at Ġnejna, Qawra and Binġemma. He also built Saint Agatha's Tower, the red tower dominating Mellieħa Bay.

Towards the end of the Order's reign, coastal entrenchments were built over Mixquqa Bay (Golden Bay), near modern-day Golden Sands Hotel. These were meant to prevent enemy troops from landing on the sandy beach below

=== The British period ===
From 1902 onwards, a number of farmers in Manikata and Għajn Tuffieħa lost a vast amount of agricultural land which was taken over by the Admiralty for the construction of a Royal Marines Training Centre. The Għajn Tuffieħa Camp consisted of shooting ranges and residential quarters for soldiers, their families and camp officials. During World War One (1914–1917) the camp was covered in tents and used as a military hospital for wounded soldiers brought here from the war front. People from Manikata used to work in this emergency hospital as nurses.

In 1935 Benito Mussolini, the Fascist ruler of Italy, invaded Abbisinia (modern Ethiopia) in Africa. The British suspected that Mussolini would attempt to invade Malta. So, they built a number of coastal defences called beach posts. These were built of concrete and camouflaged with rubble walls. Two such beach posts were built in Manikata in 1935, one near Għajn Tuffieħa Tower and the other near the Razzett tal-Qasam. When the Second World War eventually broke out, more beach posts were built along the coast. These were provided with a searchlight in order to spot enemy aircraft. Over Għajn Tuffieħa Gardens, an anti-aircraft battery was also built. Due to the presence of the Admiralty camp, Manikata was often a target during air-raids. The residents used to take shelter in rock-cut air-raid shelters, in caves or in Roman tombs.

=== Manikata today ===
Manikata is home to about 1000 inhabitants. New houses, apartments and villas have been built recently. People from different parts of the Maltese islands have come to live here in search of serenity and beautiful surroundings. Many local villagers are full-time or part-time farmers. Their fields are found in the surrounding areas known as il-Ġnien ta’ Għajn Tuffieħa (Għajn Tuffieħa Gardens), il-Wilġa ta’ Għajn Tuffieħa (Għajn Tuffieħa meadow), il-Miżieb (woodland) and ix-Xagħra l-Ħamra (The red garrigue). Every last Sunday in August the parish celebrates the feast of St. Joseph. On the eve of the parish feast, the local community celebrates Lejla Sajfija għaż-Żiffa, a Summer Breeze Night, where the villagers put their best talents and products on show, including songs, drama, paintings, hand crafts, vegetables, fruits, honey, wine, olive oil, etc.

== Historical structures ==
=== Bronze Age defensive walls ===
In the north-east of the Manikata church there is a medium barren land called Tal-Qargħa. This land contains a number of archaeological remains mainly cart-ruts, old quarry and walls built of large stones. In the land there is a girna and in the west of the structure there is a wall some 8 metres long and in it there are five large stones. Parallel to this wall there is another wall, which has six large stones. On top of the hill there is another wall and it there are three large stones, the largest one is 0.75m length and 0.6m breath. Apart from this wall there are another two built from large stones. It seems that during the Bronze Age period in this area there was a prehistoric village and it was defended by several walls against their enemies. The idea of building a village on a hill and surround it by a defensive wall is a typical characteristic of the Bronze Age Period, Borġ in-Nadur. This site has evidence of hut foundations and has the longest defensive wall of the Bronze Age Period. Borġ in-Nadur wall is the best preserved prehistoric fortification in Malta.

=== Pillbox ===
A pillbox can be found built in Manikata at the rear of Għajn Tuffieħa Camp. Pillboxes were the last type of fortification to be built in Mellieħa and Malta. These types of military structures were constructed in nearly every part of the Island. It seems that the largest number of pillboxes was built in Mellieħa and fortunately the largest number of them survived to this day. The first building programme of pillboxes occurred in 1935.

=== Għajn Tuffieħa Tower ===
Għajn Tuffieħa Tower was built in 1637, on the top of the cliffs at the western edge of Għajn Tuffieħa Bay. During the Middle Ages il-Mahras maintained a watch-post in Għajn Tuffieħa, probably in the same site where the tower was built. This is one of the seven towers built by Grand Master Lascaris, during the times of the Knights of Malta. This tower has a longish shape and the ground floor room is larger than the second floor one. It was armed with ½-pdr cannon and was manned by four men, a captain and three men.

Unfortunately, the cliffs around this Tower are eroding very badly. Serious cracks are visible on the surface of the cliffs near the Tower and huge holes can be seen on the wall of the cliffs. This tower may eventually collapse when the terrain on which it's built gives in.

== Church of St. Joseph ==
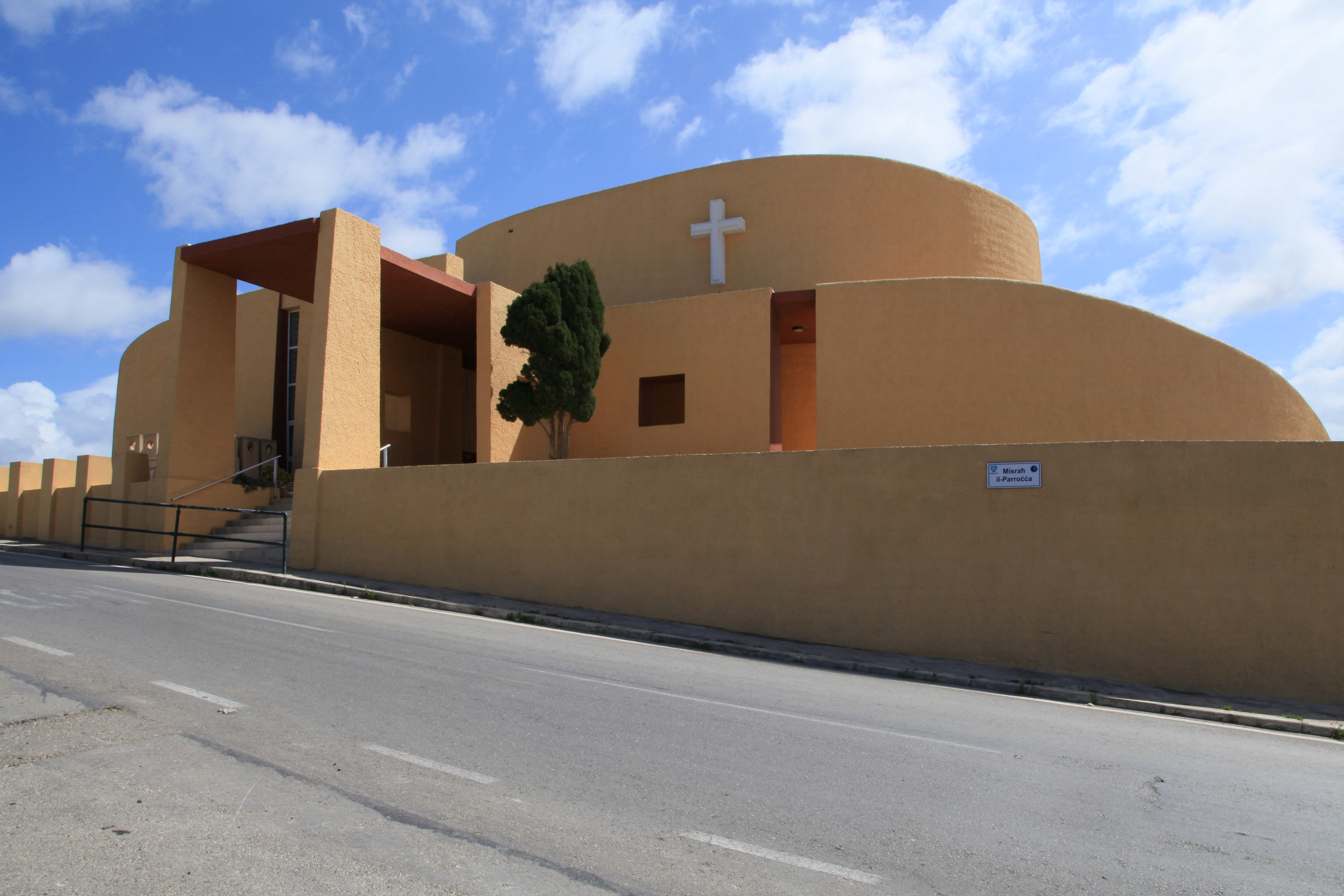
Manikata Parish Church

The Old Chapel of St. Joseph was built in 1920, when there were only twelve families living in Manikata. A number of people from this tiny village helped to build this chapel. Locals recall how the soft, honey-coloured stone was brought from Qasam Barrani quarry, while stronger stone, for the arches was brought from quarries in the north of Mosta. But with the growth of Manikata to over five hundred people the chapel of St. Joseph, which seated only 100, became too small for the religious needs of the locals.

In 1961, it was decided to build a new and larger church, the rector Fr. Manwel Grima approached architect Edwin England Sant Fournier to prepare a design for the new church. However, shortly afterwards Edwin handed over the job to his son Richard England. The building of the new church of Manikata faced numerous problems. In 1962 the first stone was laid by Archbishop Sir Michael Gonzi, but after the death of Fr. Grima the church remained half built for five years. Finally Manikata's new church was finished and blessed on 29 November 1974 by Archbishop Sir Michael Gonzi, more than ten years after he officially had laid the first stone.

The architect Richard England, who built the church took his inspiration from the "girna" which one sometimes sees in the middle of a field, a small stone building put up by farmers to store in it their implements.

== Military camps ==
On the outskirts of Manikata there were two military camps in the 1960s. One was home to Royal Malta Artillery and the other was a British Army camp which hosted many different regiments including the Royal Marines. These army camps are no longer active.

== In popular culture ==
- The sack of the Lhazareen by the Dothraki in the 2012 TV series Game of Thrones was filmed in Manikata.
