= Blat Mogħża Tower =

- Torri ta' Blat Mogħża
- Part of the Lascaris towers
- Mġarr, Malta

Site information
- Type: Coastal watchtower

Location
- Coordinates: 35°54′54.5″N 14°20′11.5″E

Site history
- Built: c. 1637
- Built by: Order of Saint John
- In use: c. 1637–18th century
- Materials: Limestone
- Fate: Collapsed, c. 1730

Blat Mogħża Tower (Maltese: Torri ta' Blat Mogħża), also known as Ta' Capra Tower (Maltese: Torri ta' Capra), was a small watchtower in Fomm ir-Riħ, limits of Mġarr, Malta. It was one of the Lascaris towers, which were mainly coastal watchtowers built in Malta between 1637 and 1652.

Blat Mogħża Tower was built sometime during the reign of Giovanni Paolo Lascaris on the site of a medieval watch post. Its design was probably similar to Lippija and Għajn Tuffieħa Towers, which were built in 1637. It would have had Lippija and Nadur Towers in its line of sight.

The tower was built on the edge of a cliff face, which began to subside. According to the Order of Saint John's engineer Charles François de Mondion, the tower was in ruins by 1730. It was never rebuilt.
