= Lascaris towers =

Lascaris Towers
- Torrijiet ta' Lascaris
- Various locations in Malta and Gozo

Site information
- Type: Coastal watchtowers
- Condition: 9 intact 1 destroyed

Site history
- Built: 1637–1638; 1647–1652
- Built by: Order of Saint John
- In use: 1637–20th century
- Materials: Limestone

The Lascaris Towers (Maltese: Torrijiet ta' Lascaris) are a series of mostly small coastal watchtowers built in Malta by the Order of Saint John between 1637 and 1652. The first seven towers were built around the coast of mainland Malta in 1637 and 1638. Between 1647 and 1652, a large tower was also built on mainland Malta, and two smaller ones were built on Gozo.

== History ==
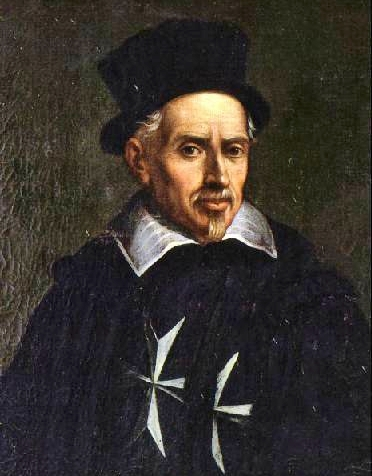
Giovanni Paolo Lascaris

=== Commissioning and construction ===
The Italian knight Giovanni Paolo Lascaris was elected Grand Master of the Order of St. John on 16 June 1636. Unlike the earlier Wignacourt towers which were personally funded by the Grand Master, the cost of the Lascaris towers was paid by the Università. Construction of the first tower, located at ta' Lippija near Ġnejna, began in 1637. Another six towers were built within the following year.

Six of the seven original towers were coastal watchtowers, built on or near the sites of medieval watch posts. The only Lascaris tower which is located inland is the Nadur Tower at Binġemma Gap, which was built to facilitate communication between the other towers and the fortified city of Mdina.

Another tower, Saint Agatha's Tower, was built between 1647 and 1649. Unlike the original towers, this was a large bastioned structure similar to the earlier Wignacourt towers.

The last two towers to be built in Lascaris' reign were the ones at Xlendi and Dwejra. These were built in 1650 and 1652 respectively, and the cost of construction was paid by the Università of Gozo.

In 1658 and 1659, Lascaris' successor, Martin de Redin, built another 13 watchtowers around Malta's coastline, which became known as the De Redin towers. The design of the new towers were based on Sciuta Tower. Due to their similarity in design, sometimes the Lascaris and De Redin towers are collectively known as "De Redin towers".

=== Eighteenth and nineteenth centuries ===
In around 1715, as part of a programme to improve Malta's coastal defences, Qawra Tower was upgraded into a coastal battery. A gun platform was built around the seaward face of the tower, which served as a blockhouse. At this point, a redan trace entrenchment was built near Saint Agatha's Tower.

Blat Mogħża Tower collapsed in around 1730 when the cliffs on which it was built gave way. The tower was never rebuilt, and no traces of it can be seen today.

In the 1760s, entrenchments were built near Qawra Tower.

Most of the towers were decommissioned in the 19th century, but some saw use again in World War II.

=== Conservation and restoration ===
By the end of the 20th century, most of the nine surviving towers were in a rather dilapidated state. St. Agatha's Tower and Lippija Tower were in a particularly bad state, and were in danger of collapsing.

St. George's Tower, Dwejra Tower, St. Agatha's Tower, Għajn Tuffieħa Tower and Lippija Tower were all restored between the late 1990s and 2013. Xlendi Tower is currently being restored, while plans are also being made for the restoration of Sciuta Tower.

Today, Għajn Tuffieħa, St. Agatha's and Dwejra Towers are open to the public. St. George's Tower is within the grounds of a hotel, and Qawra Tower is open as a restaurant.

== The towers ==
Name	Image	Location	Built	Status
Lippija Tower		Mġarr	1637	Intact
Għajn Tuffieħa Tower		Mġarr	1637	Intact
Blat Mogħża Tower		Mġarr	c. 1637	Collapsed
Nadur Tower		Rabat	1637	Intact
Qawra Tower		St. Paul's Bay	1638	Intact
Sciuta Tower		Qrendi	1638	Intact
Saint George's Tower		St. Julian's	1638	Intact
Saint Agatha's Tower		Mellieħa	1647-9	Intact
Xlendi Tower		Munxar	1650	Intact
Dwejra Tower		San Lawrenz	1652	Intact

Lascaris towers

== See also ==
- Lascaris Battery
- Lascaris War Rooms
