= Ġnejna Bay =

Bay in Mġarr, Malta

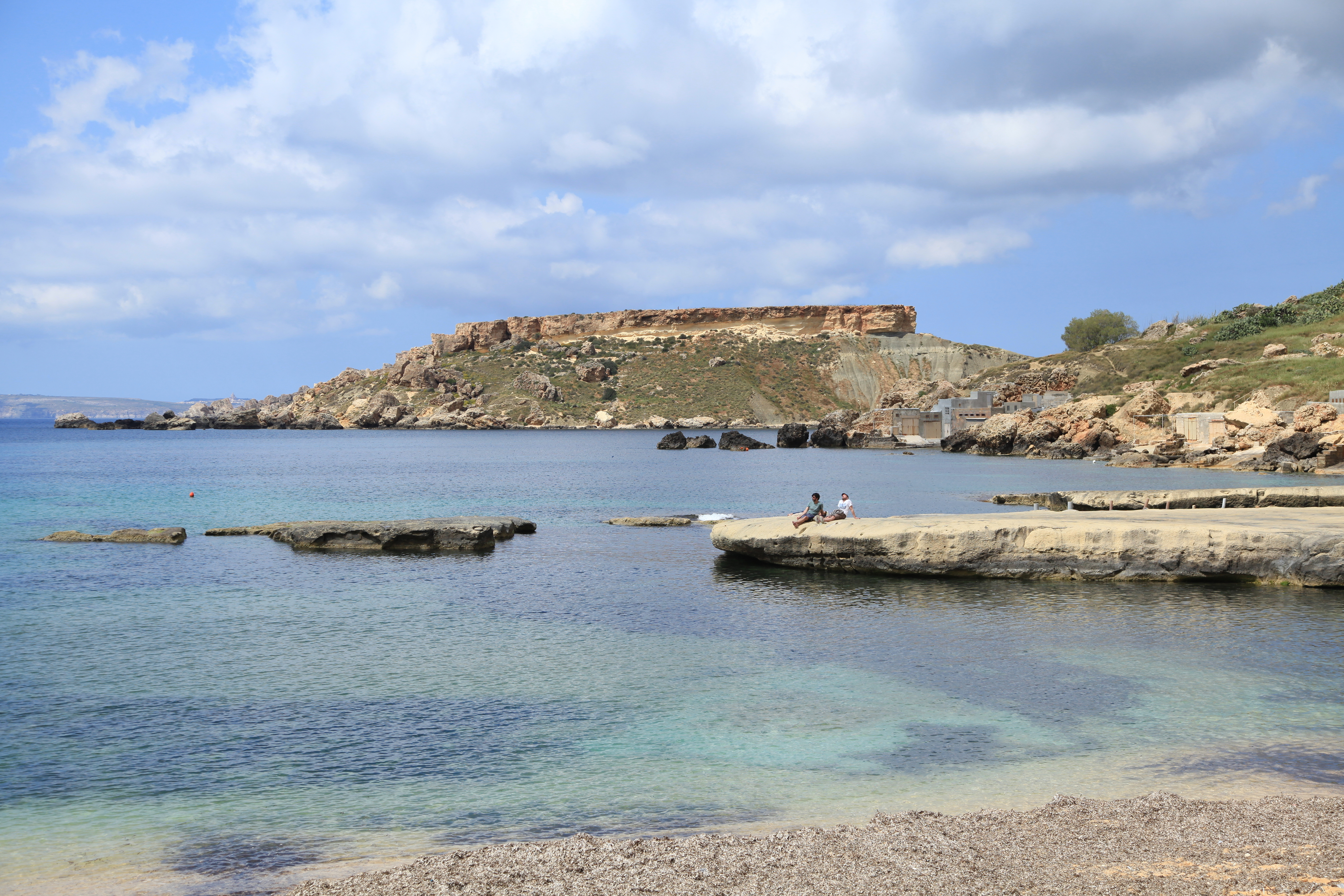
- Gnejna Bay, with Il-Karraba in the background

- Location of the bay in Malta
- Location: Malta
- Group: Mediterranean Sea
- Coordinates: 35°55′27″N 14°20′27″E
- Type: Bay
- Surface elevation: 0 metres (0 ft)

Ġnejna Bay (Maltese pronunciation: [ˈd͡ʒnɛɪ̯nɐ]) is a popular tourist destination located about 1 kilometer from the village of Mġarr on the western coast of Malta. The beach surrounding the bay is mostly sandy. A secluded strip of shore under the steep cliff on the northern side of the bay is a popular nude beach, although the practice is technically illegal in Malta and frowned upon by the conservative Catholic population.

Ġnejna is notable for its striking clay slopes and limestone cliffs. These serve as the headlands for one of Malta's few remaining perennial freshwater springs, that runs through Wied il-Ġnejna. Although the valley is a protected area, its watercourse is considered at risk due to illegal damming and tapping.

On 30 June 2007, a boat with 26 illegal immigrants was intercepted at Ġnejna Bay by Maltese authorities.

== Fishing ==
The fishermen of Ġnejna Bay use traditional techniques, such as attracting fish with lamps at night.

== Fortifications ==
Above the bay, on a tall, rocky outcrop, is Lippia Tower (also known as Ta' Lippia or Ġnejna Watch Tower), built in 1637 by Vincenzo Maculani upon orders from Grand Master Giovanni Paolo Lascaris. Lippia Tower formed part of the intricate coastal defence network constructed by the Knights of St. John. Watchguards housed in Lippia Tower and a nearby tower at Għajn Tuffieħa, would communicate with the inland Nadur Tower by means of flags by day and bonfires by night, which would, in turn, raise the alarm in the walled city of Mdina when corsairs were sighted off the western coast of Malta.

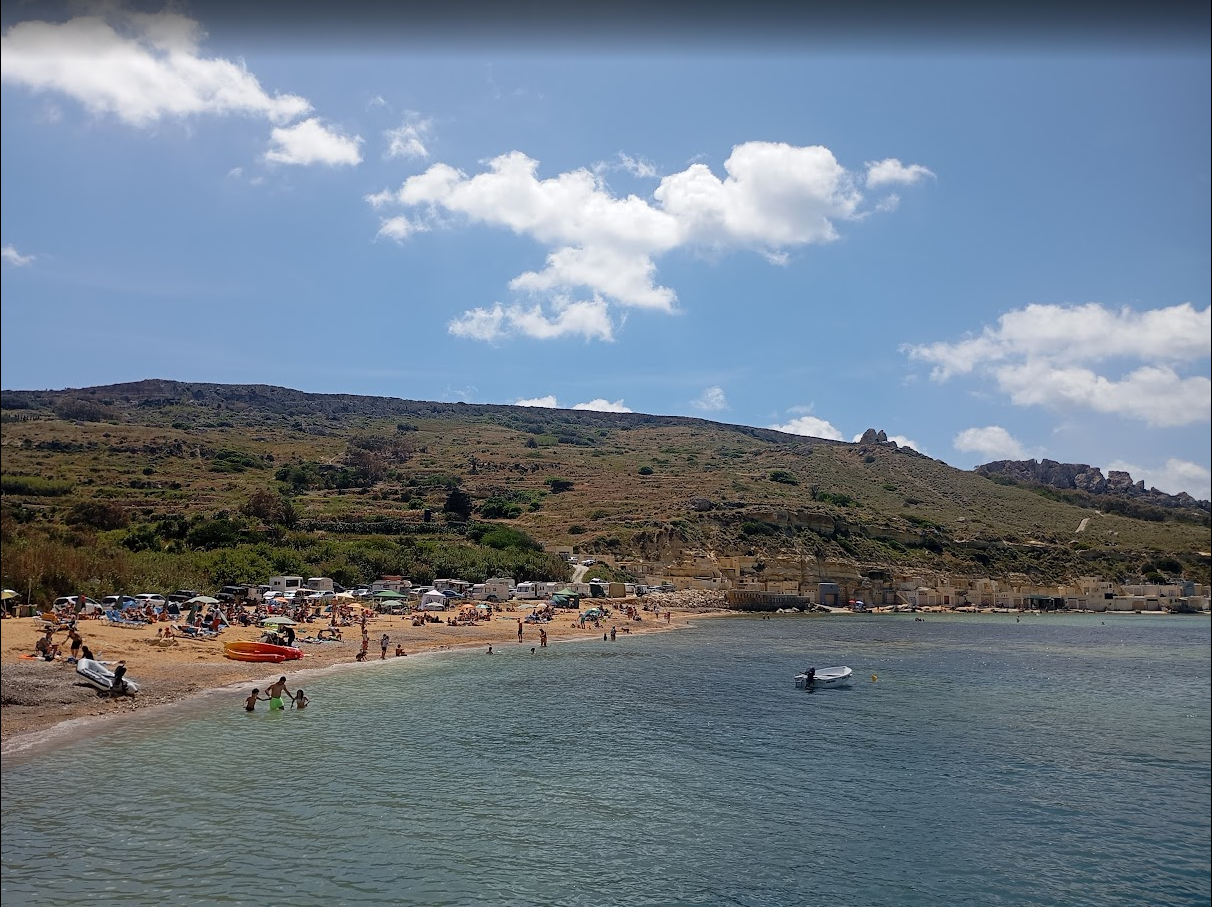
Ġnejna Bay

Ġnejna has a pillbox dating from the Second World War, camouflaged to look like a farmhouse.

== The Legend of Castello Zammitello ==
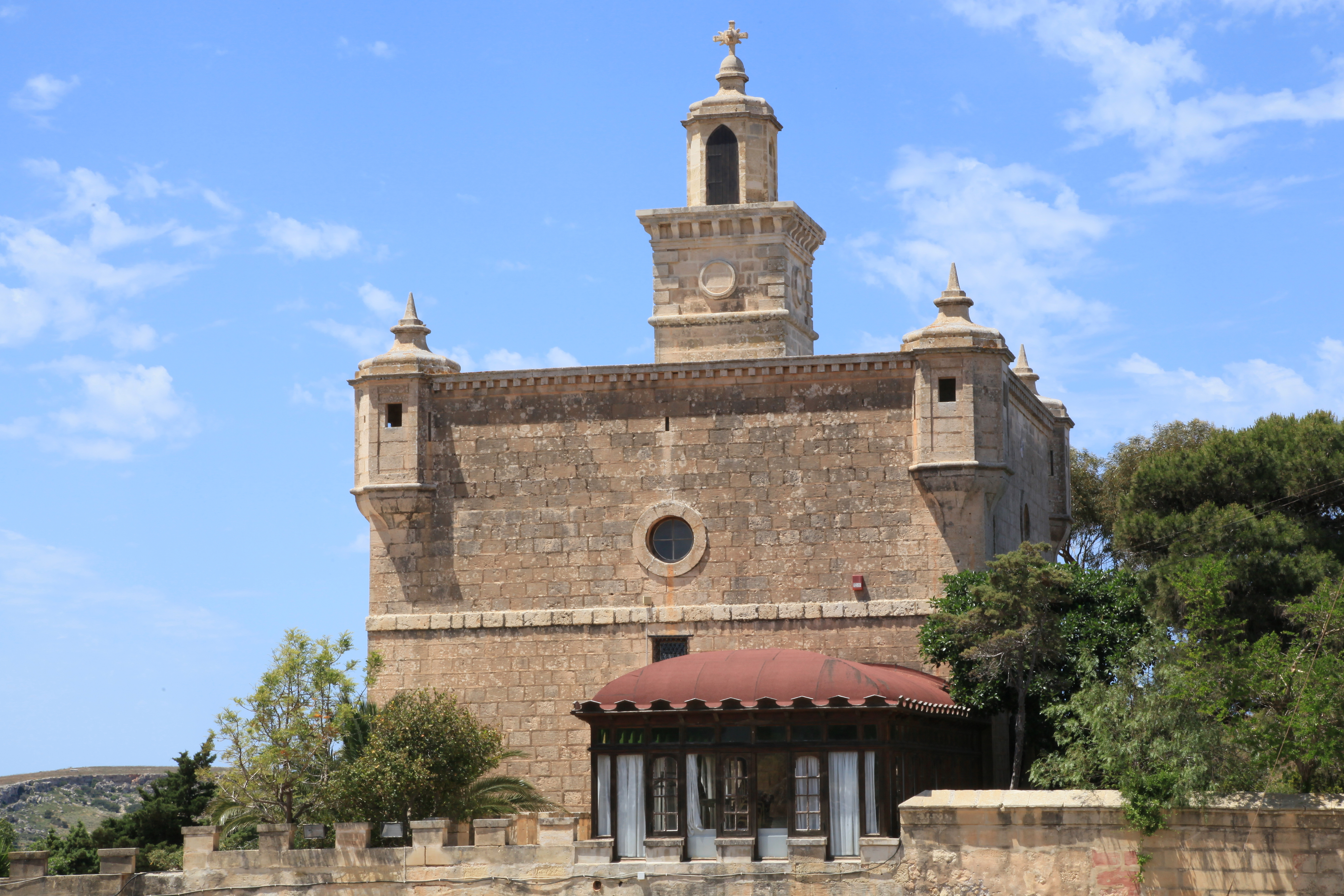
Castello Zamittello

The road leading down towards Ġnejna Bay features Castello Zammitello, a Norman-style fortified house built in 1675. According to local legend, Lucia, the only daughter of a certain Baron Bernardo Zammit, disappeared from her bedroom on the morning of her wedding to a wealthy Sicilian count, some 300 years ago. Believing that Lucia had been abducted by corsairs, the Baron mounted an armed search of Ġnejna Bay, which proved futile. One year later, the bells of a local church started tolling unexpectedly, and a vision of the missing Lucia, clad in a nun's habit, appeared before the altar. She told the villagers that she had run away from home to avoid marrying the elderly Count and, having taken nun's vows, had spent the past year tending to the wounded in a foreign land until she was killed by a stray arrow.

Castello Zammitello, which was more recently the home of the noble Sant Cassia family, gained notoriety on 27 October 1988 as the site of Baron Francis Sant Cassia's murder, a crime which remains shrouded in mystery.

== Lippija Tower ==
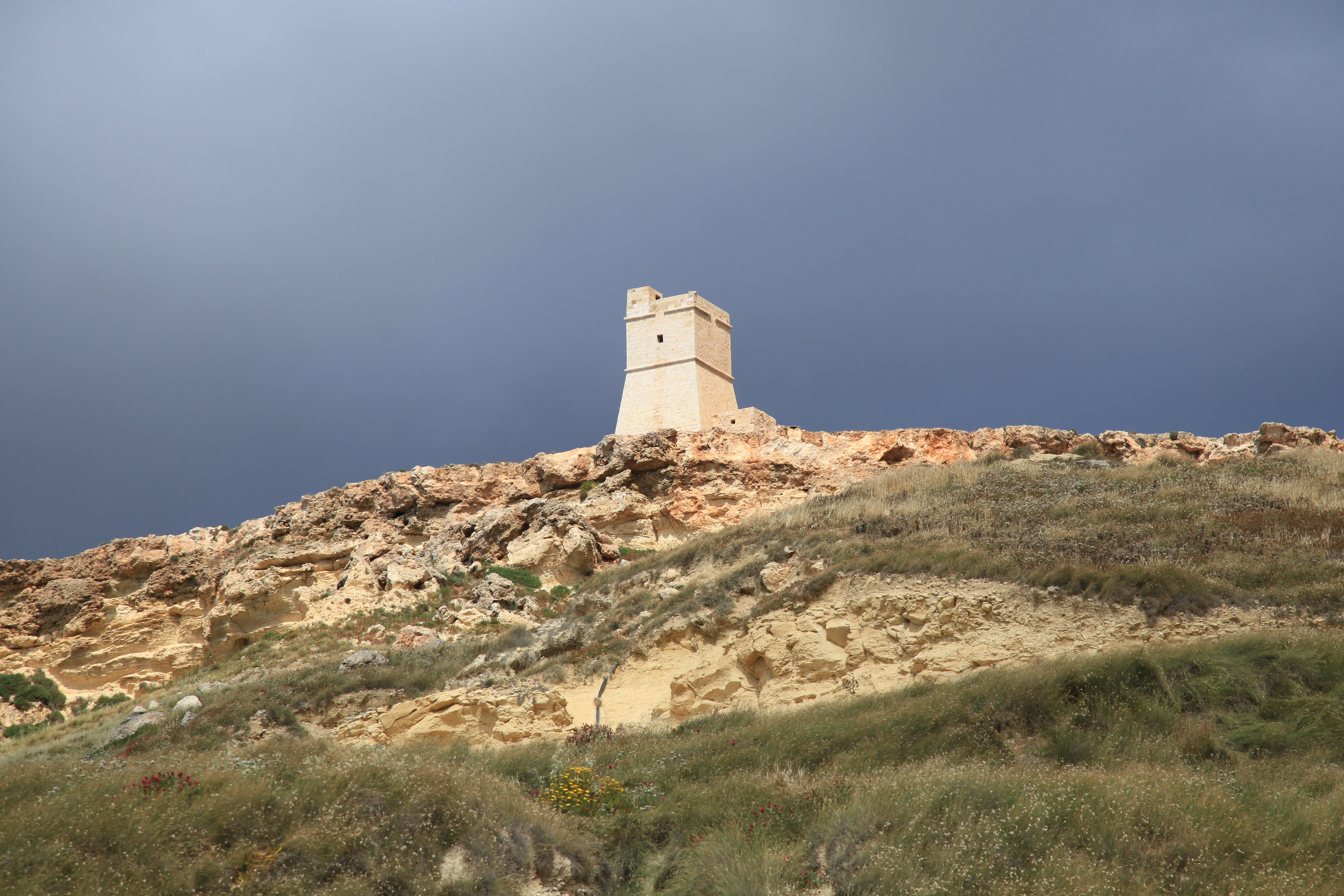
Lippija Tower

Lippija Tower is located on the north-west coast of Malta, about 100m above sea level. It was built in 1637 upon orders by Grand Master Juan de Lascaris-Castellar. The watch tower formed part of the intricate coastal defence network constructed by the Knights of St. John.

For centuries the coastline of Malta has been dotted with lookout posts or watch towers that were built by the Knights of St. John (Knights Hospitaller, Knights of Malta) during the 17th century. These towers were manned nightly to watch the seaward approaches and to raise the alarm in the event of imminent threat. The positioning of these towers was planned so that each tower had direct line of sight to both neighbouring towers, which acted as an early warning system against invaders. As soon as one tower spotted a suspicious event, a fire signal was started which was picked up by the neighbouring towers, which communicated the signal further. A number of coastal towers were built during the reigns of Grand Master Alof de Wignacourt (1601–1622), Grand Master Paul Lascaris-Castellar (1636–1657) and Grand Master Martin de Redin (1657–1660). The aim was to strengthen Malta's coastal guarding system. Under the reign of Grand Master Juan de Lascaris-Castellar, seven towers were built in the period 1637–1640. Lascaris paid for the building of these towers out of his own pocket, such was his dedication to fortifying Malta's coastal defences. With the exception of St. Agatha's Tower in Mellieħa (built in Wignacourt's style), the Lascaris towers are smaller than Wignacourt's and consisted of two storeys, a flat roof and a parapet.

== Illegal properties ==
Although Gnejna Bay is a protected area, many illegal dwellings — mostly boathouses — have been constructed over the years.

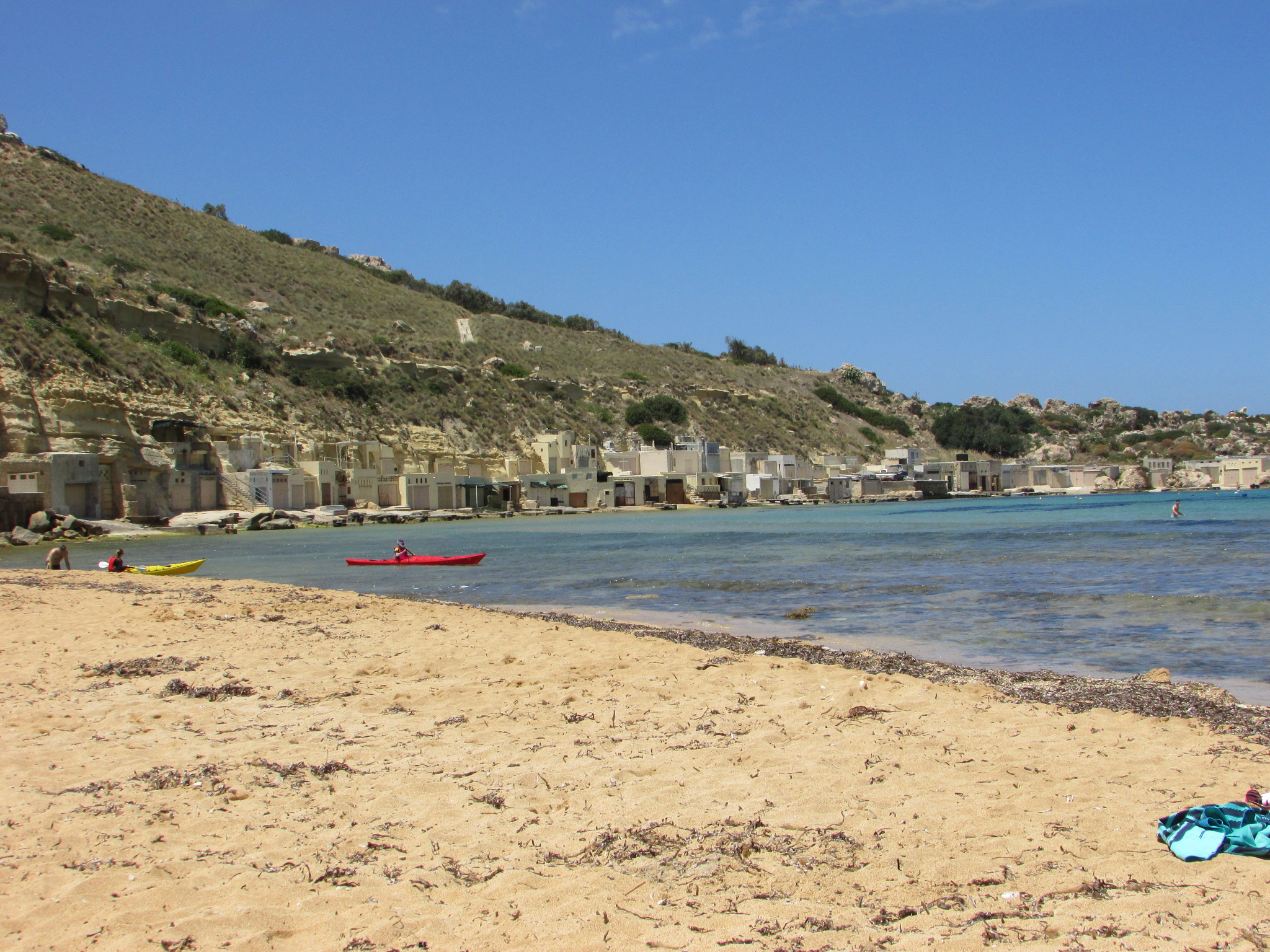
Illegal boathouses in Gnejna Bay
