= Sopu Tower =

- Torri ta' Sopu
- Nadur, Gozo, Malta
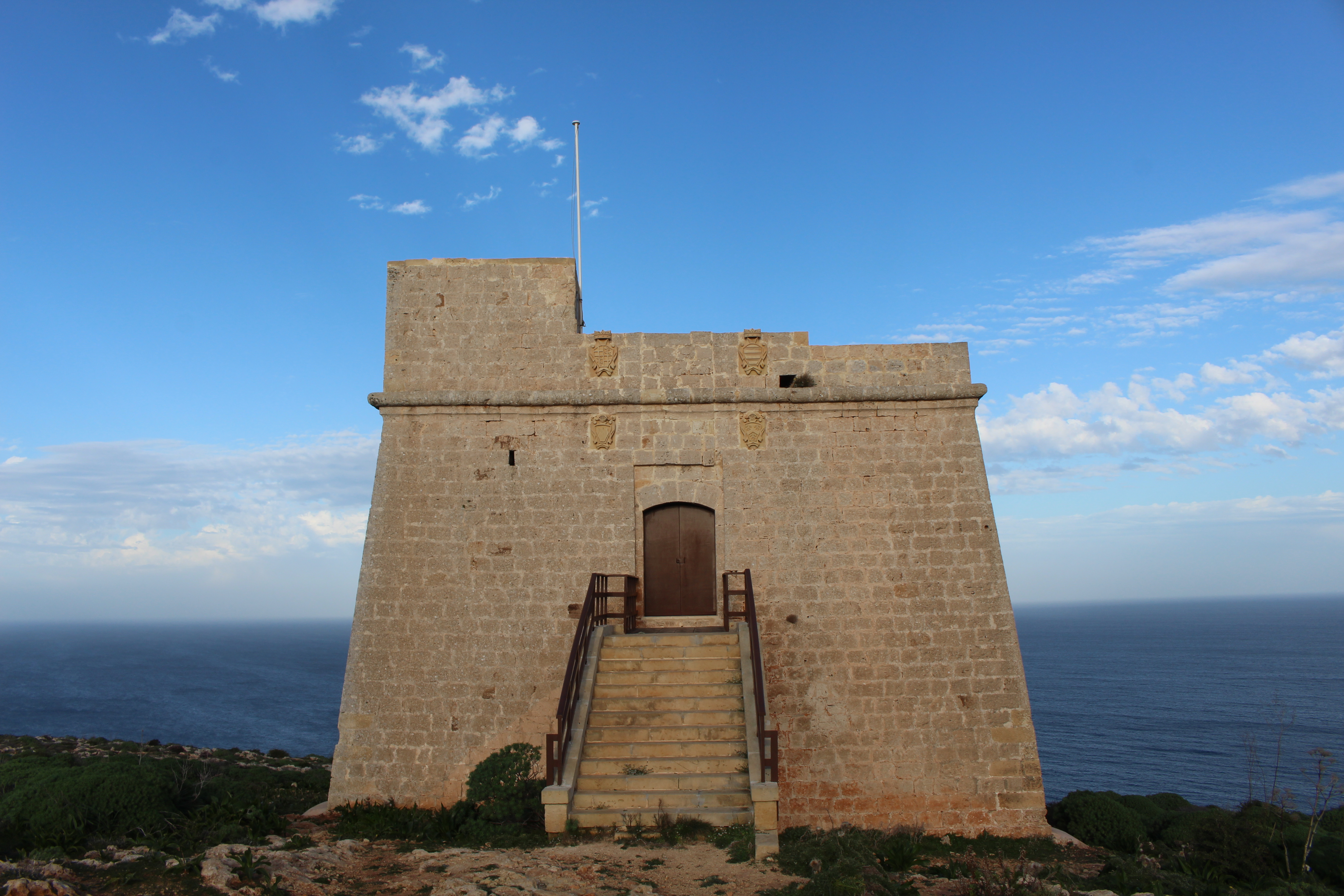
- Isopu Tower

Site information
- Type: Coastal watchtower
- Owner: Government of Malta
- Controlled by: Din l-Art Ħelwa
- Open to the public: Yes
- Condition: Intact

Location
- Location within Malta
- Coordinates: 36°3′19.6″N 14°18′33.1″E

Site history
- Built: 1667
- Built by: Order of Saint John
- Materials: Limestone
- Battles/wars: Capture of Malta (1798)

Sopu Tower (Maltese: Torri ta' Sopu), also known as Isopu Tower, San Blas Tower or Torre Nuova, is a small watchtower situated on the cliff between San Blas and Daħlet Qorrot in Nadur, Gozo, Malta.

Isopu Tower was the last watchtower to be built in Malta, apart from the tour-reduits of the 18th century. It is one of four surviving towers on Gozo, with the others being Xlendi Tower, Dwejra Tower and Mġarr ix-Xini Tower. The earlier Garzes and Marsalforn towers were destroyed in the 18th and 19th centuries.

== History ==
Isopu Tower was built by the Order of Saint John in 1667 during the reign of Grandmaster Nicolas Cotoner at the expense of the Università of Gozo. The latter paid for its garrison but artillery was supplied by the Order itself. The tower is square in shape, and the design is similar to the Xlendi and Dwejra towers.

The walls are thick with inward slopes. The tower has a high barrel vault with the middle floor resting on rib arches. A spiral staircase provides access to the various floors. The main doorway had four escutcheons with coats of arms of the Order and the Gozo Università, and the personal arms of Cotoner and the Governor of Gozo.

By 1785 the tower was not permanently manned, but in 1792 it was rearmed with four 6-pounder iron guns. It was the only small coastal watchtower which actually tried to resist the French invasion of 1798 when it fired its guns on the approaching French fleet.

== Present day ==
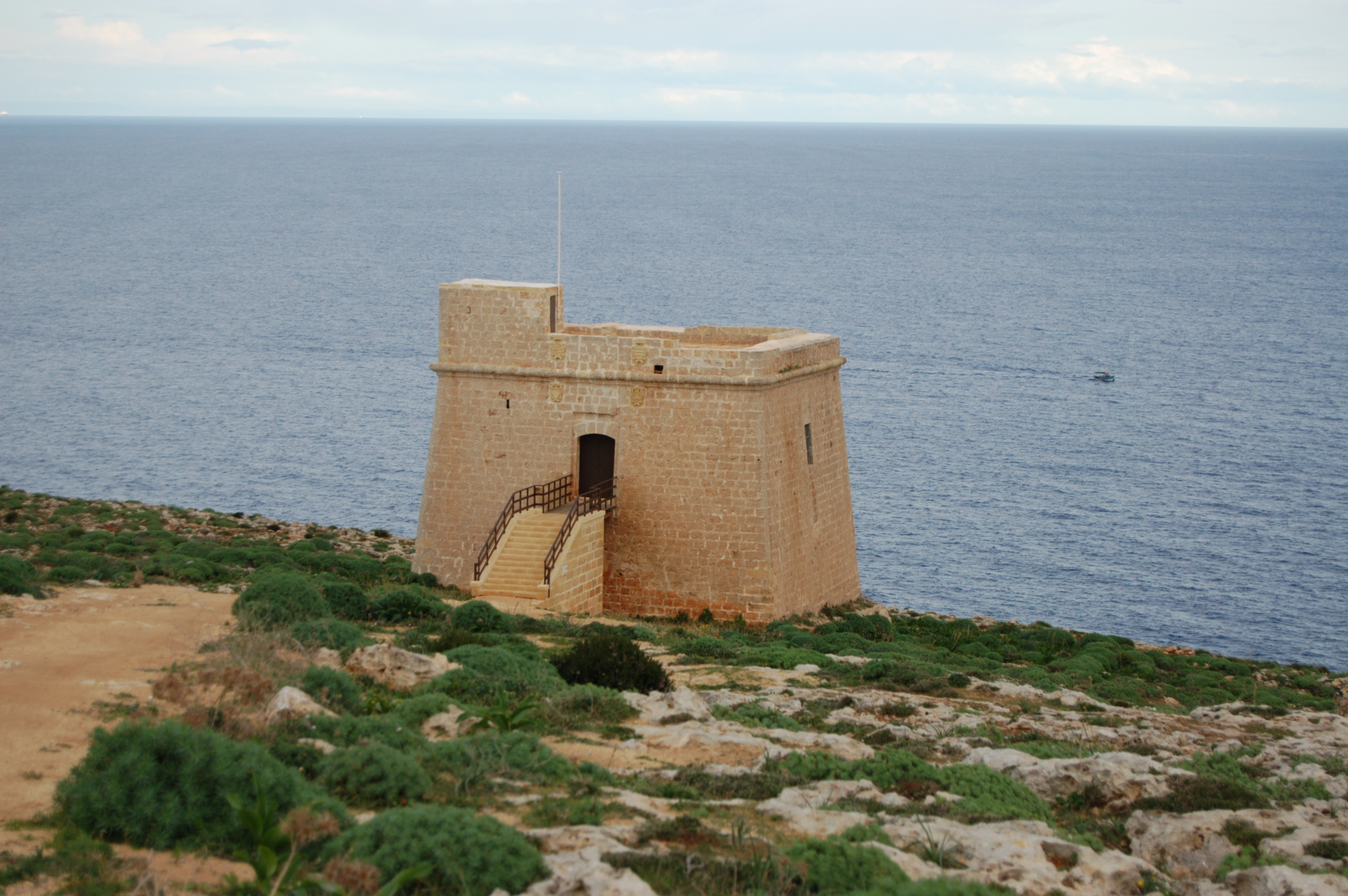
The tower as seen from land, with the sea in the background

By the early 21st century, the tower was in a state of disrepair. Parts of it had weathered while most of the interior had already collapsed. The tower was restored by Din l-Art Ħelwa and the Nadur Local Council between 2003 and 2006. The restoration work was carried out by hand by Leli Saliba and his son. The spiral staircase was completely rebuilt from scratch, as were the roof and most of the interior. Only one of the original arches had survived, and it was used as a model on which to rebuild the roof. The restored tower was reopened on 20 August 2006.

Nowadays, the tower is open for visitors on three Sundays in every month, but plans are underway to convert it into a visitor centre as part of a nature trail in the area.

The area around the tower has been designated as a special conservation area.
