= Xlendi Tower =

Historic watchtower on Gozo, Malta

- Torri tax-Xlendi
- Part of the Lascaris towers
- Xlendi, Munxar, Gozo, Malta
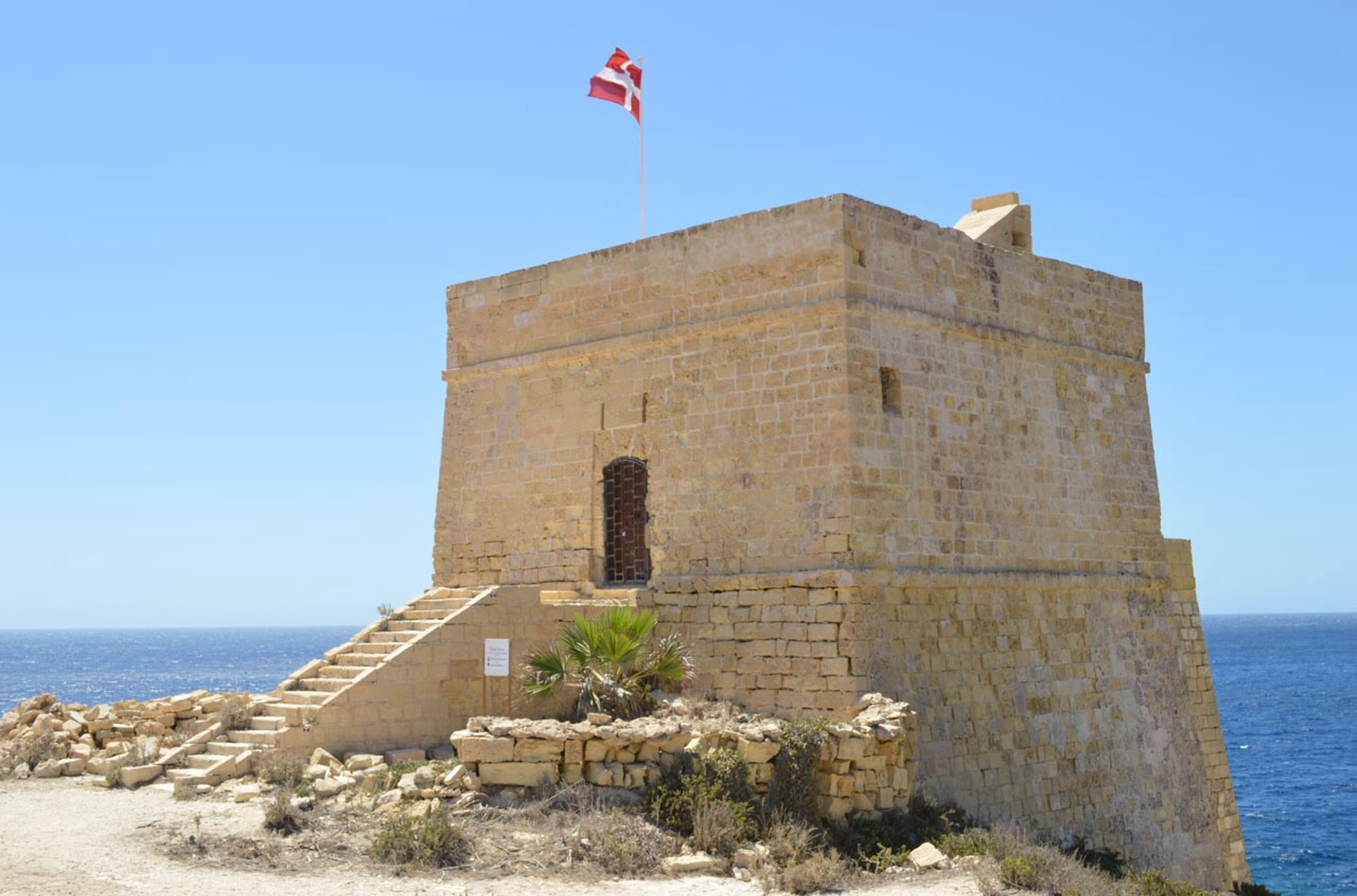
- View of Xlendi Tower

Site information
- Type: Coastal watchtower
- Owner: Government of Malta
- Controlled by: Munxar Local Council
- Open to the public: No
- Condition: Intact

Location
- Coordinates: 36°1′39.5″N 14°12′47.2″E

Site history
- Built: 1650
- Built by: Order of Saint John
- In use: 1650–1873; 1940s
- Materials: Limestone
- Battles/wars: World War II

Xlendi Tower (Maltese: Torri tax-Xlendi) is a small watchtower near Xlendi Bay, within the limits of Munxar on the island of Gozo in Malta. The tower is one of the Lascaris towers and dates to 1650; it is currently undergoing restoration.

It is the oldest of the four surviving watchtowers on Gozo, the three others being Dwejra Tower, Mġarr ix-Xini Tower and Isopu Tower. (Note: Saint Mary's Tower on Comino, an island that is administratively part of Gozo, was built in 1618.) The earlier Marsalforn and Garzes and towers were destroyed in the 18th and 19th centuries, respectively.

== History ==
Xlendi Tower was proposed in 1649 by the Baliff Baldassare de Demandolx. Construction began soon after, and it was complete by June 1650. The Università of Gozo paid the cost of construction.

The tower is rectangular and its design is similar to that of the earlier Lascaris towers on Malta. Unlike the earlier Lascaris towers, Xlendi Tower has an additional platform with a slope to its base on the seaward side. It has a flat roof, where guns were mounted. Initially it held two 6-pounder guns, which were later replaced by two 4-pounder guns. Entrance to the tower is via an external flight of stairs that connects to the only doorway, which is situated on the second floor. Originally, the tower was under the command of a Capomastro, assisted by a bombardier, and an Aggiutante, all of whom were paid by the Università. At night, three men manned the tower. Salt pans are located close to the tower.

By 1681 it was already in poor condition, needing renovation. During the British era the tower became the responsibility of the Royal Malta Fencible Regiment (1815–1861), which became the Royal Malta Fencible Artillery (1861–81). When the Fencible Artillery was relieved of its coastal watch duties in 1873, the tower was abandoned.

During World War II, the Coast Police manned the tower as an observation post, and in 1954 the tower was leased to private persons but was eventually abandoned.

== Present day ==
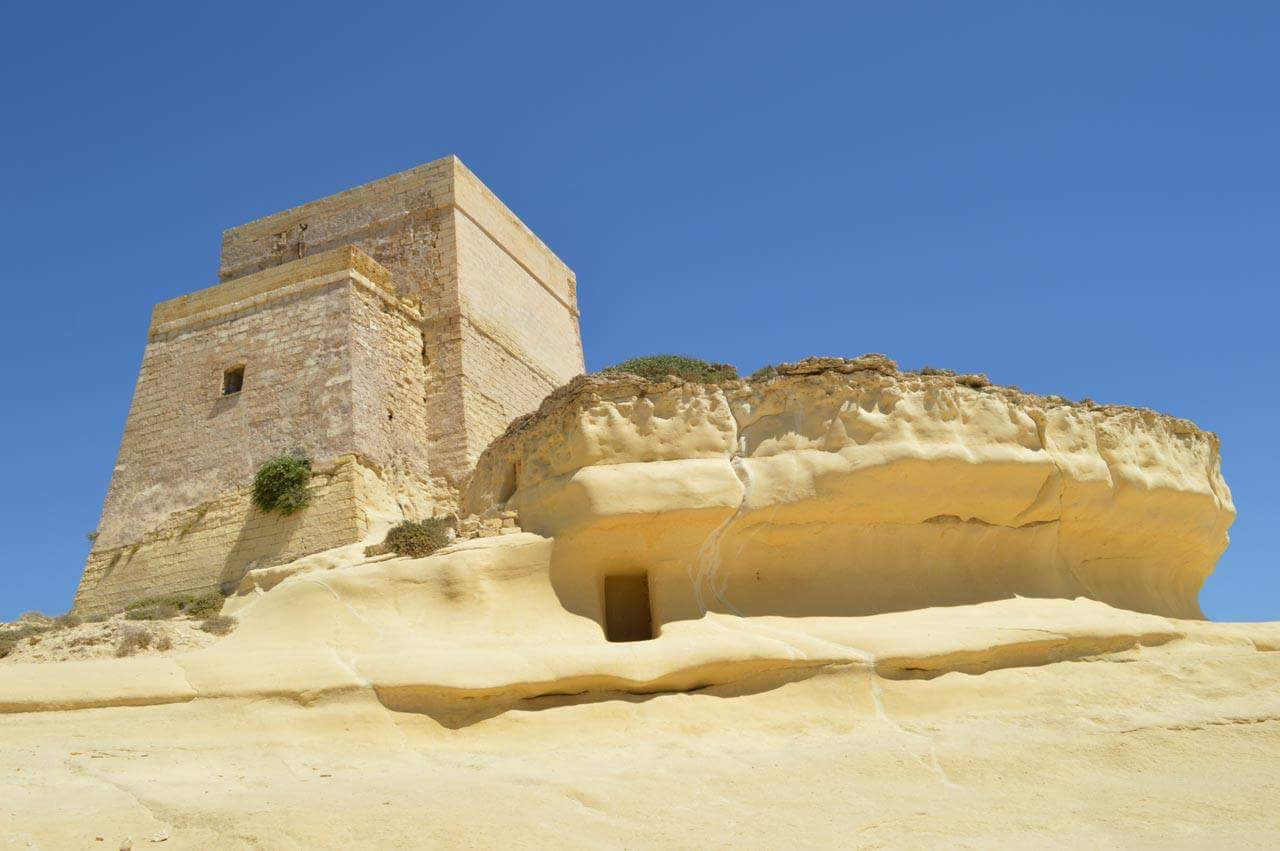
Xlendi Tower as seen from the west

The tower was handed to the Munxar Local Council and Din l-Art Ħelwa in October 2009. They were engaged to restore the tower, while sharing the expenses equally.

In 2024, Din l-Art Ħelwa does not have guardianship of Xlendi tower.
