= Saint George's Tower =

Artem Kraft

- Torri ta' San Ġorġ
- Part of the Lascaris towers
- St. Julian's, Malta
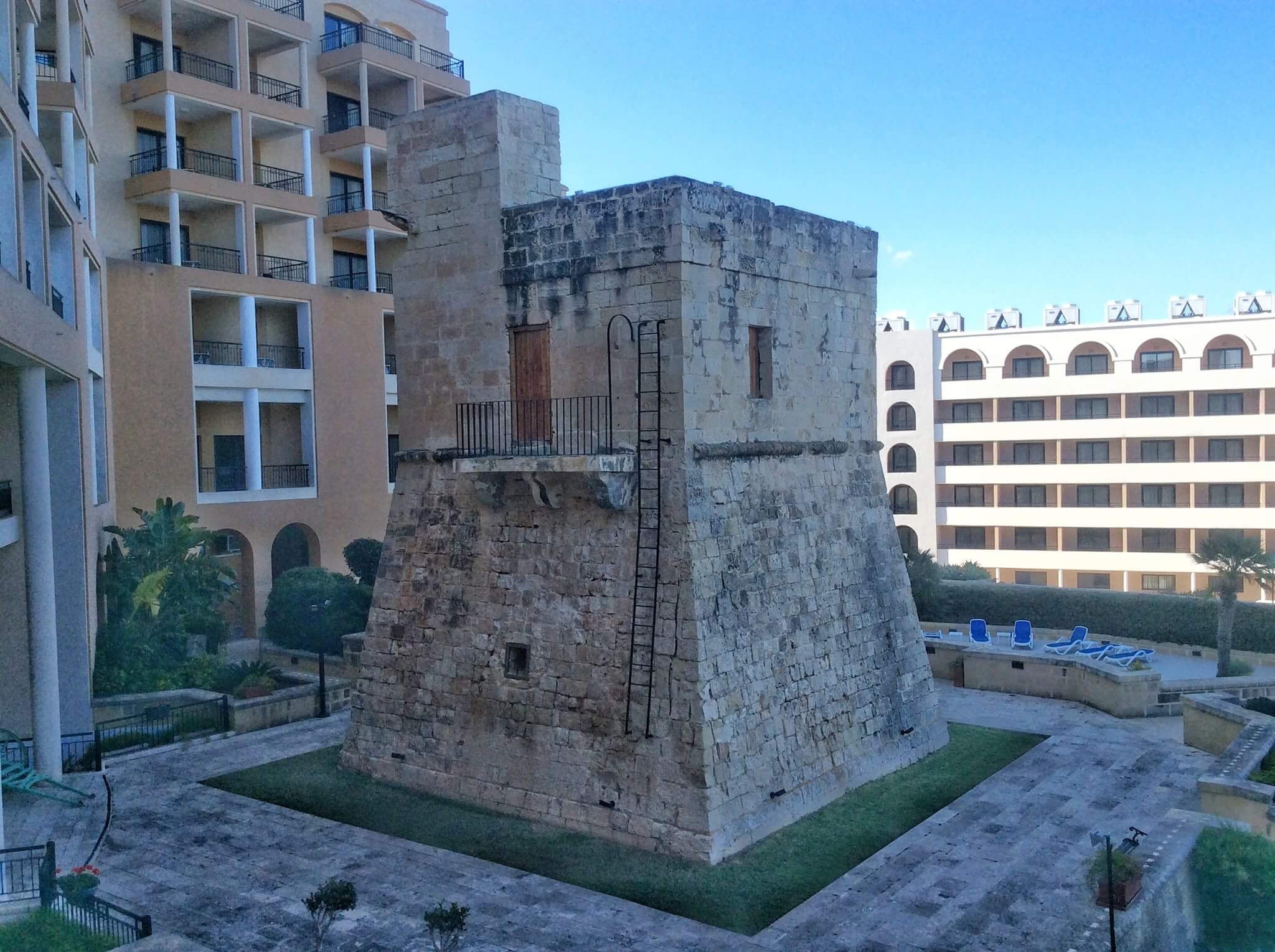
- St. George's Tower

Site information
- Type: Coastal watchtower
- Owner: Government of Malta
- Controlled by: Corinthia Hotels International
- Condition: Intact but dilapidated

Location
- Coordinates: 35°55′44.4″N 14°29′27″E

Site history
- Built: 1638
- Built by: Order of Saint John
- Materials: Limestone

Saint George's Tower (Maltese: Torri ta' San Ġorġ; Italian: Torre San Giorgio) is a small watchtower in St. Julian's, Malta. It was built in 1638 and is one of the 10 Lascaris towers built between 1637 and 1652. Today, it is located in the grounds of a hotel.

== History ==
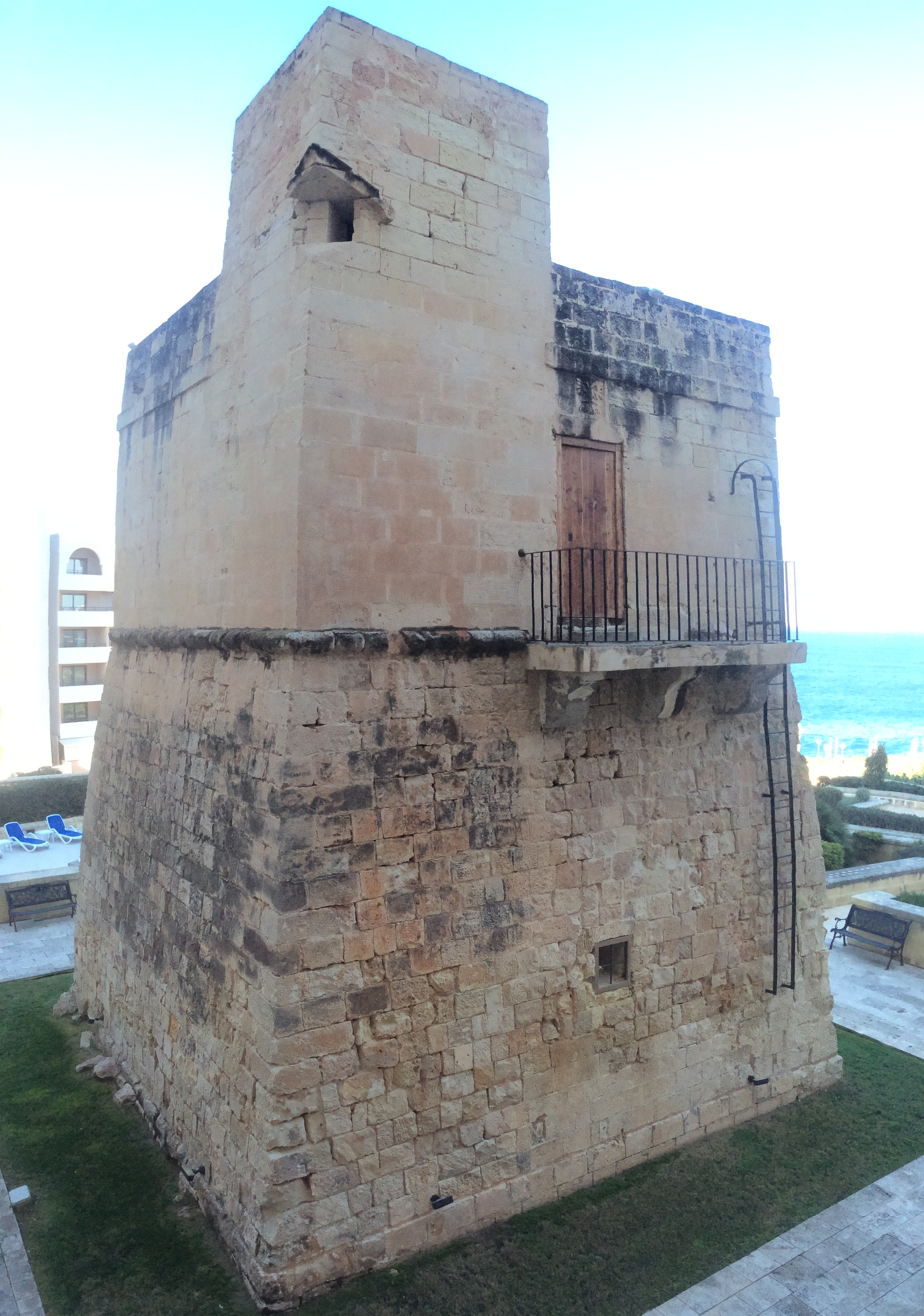
View of the tower

Saint George's Tower is located at St. George's Bay, St. Julian's. Its site was originally occupied by a medieval watch post. It appears in maps of the period of the Knights at Cala S. Giorgio (St George's Point). The tower remained in use during the British period but was converted to a Fire Control Station once Fort Pembroke was built. The tower served as a radio communications post in World War II. The tower appears in a 1916 painting with the British additions.

It was listed by MEPA as a Grade I National Monument in 1995, and in 1997 the fire control tower added by the British was demolished, which restored the tower to its original state.

== Accessibility ==
Saint George's tower is now incorporated within the grounds of the Corinthia Hotel St George's Bay. No independent sources currently state whether access is freely available to the general public or restricted to hotel guests or tour participants.

== See also ==
- Lascaris towers
- List of monuments in St. Julian's
