= Dwejra Tower =

1652 watchtower on Gozo, Malta

- Torri tad-Dwejra
- Part of the Lascaris towers
- Dwejra, San Lawrenz, Gozo, Malta
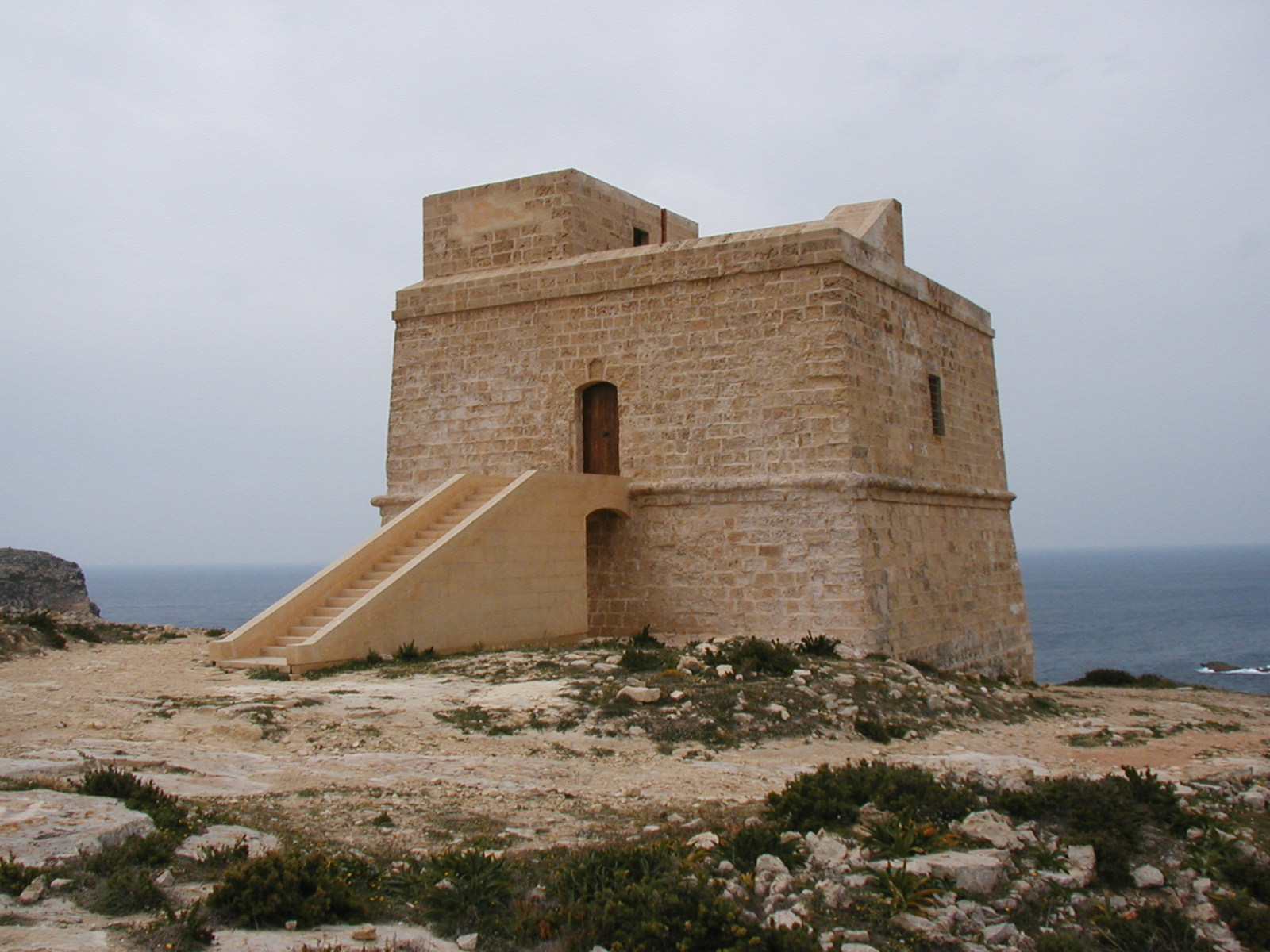
- Dwejra Tower

Site information
- Type: Coastal watchtower
- Owner: Government of Malta
- Controlled by: Din l-Art Ħelwa
- Open to the public: Yes
- Condition: Intact

Location
- Coordinates: 36°2′58.1″N 14°11′31.4″E

Site history
- Built: 1652
- Built by: Order of Saint John
- In use: 1652–1873; 1914–1940s
- Materials: Limestone
- Battles/wars: World War II

Dwejra Tower (Maltese: Torri tad-Dwejra) is a small watchtower in Dwejra Bay, San Lawrenz, which is on the island of Gozo in Malta. It was completed in 1652, and is part of the Lascaris towers. It is in good condition and is open to the public.

It is one of four surviving coastal watchtowers in Gozo, with the others being Xlendi Tower, Mġarr ix-Xini Tower and Isopu Tower.

== History ==
The Dwejra Tower was built in 1652 during the magistracy of Grand Master Giovanni Paolo Lascaris, and was funded by the University of Gozo. It is one of the Lascaris towers, which was meant to act as a watchtower and guard the surrounding areas from corsair landings. This tower, just like the other towers, could communicate to nearby defence fortifications through fire and smoke, at night and day, respectively. The expenses for running the tower were covered by producing salt from the nearby salt pans. It was equipped with three 6-pounder guns in the eighteenth century. In 1744, Grand Master Pinto made going to the Fungus Rock illegal because a plant, popularly known as the Maltese fungus, growing on the rock's flat top was believed to have medicinal powers, and Dwejra Tower was used as a lookout to prevent anyone climbing on the islet.

The tower was manned by the Royal Malta Fencible Artillery between 1839 and 1873. It was then abandoned until 1914, during the time of the First World War, when the King's Own Malta Regiment and the Royal Malta Artillery were dispatched and it was manned by No. 3 Company with two (later four) 12-pounder guns. It was again used in World War II as an observation post, and on the 27th March 1943, Captain Frank Debono and Carmelo Zahra, who were stationed there, rescued an RAF pilot who had crash-landed his Mark Vb Spitfire on the cliffs overlooking the bay.

The tower was leased to Gerald de Trafford in 1956. It was passed on loan to Din l-Art Ħelwa in a state of complete dilapidation.

== Present day ==
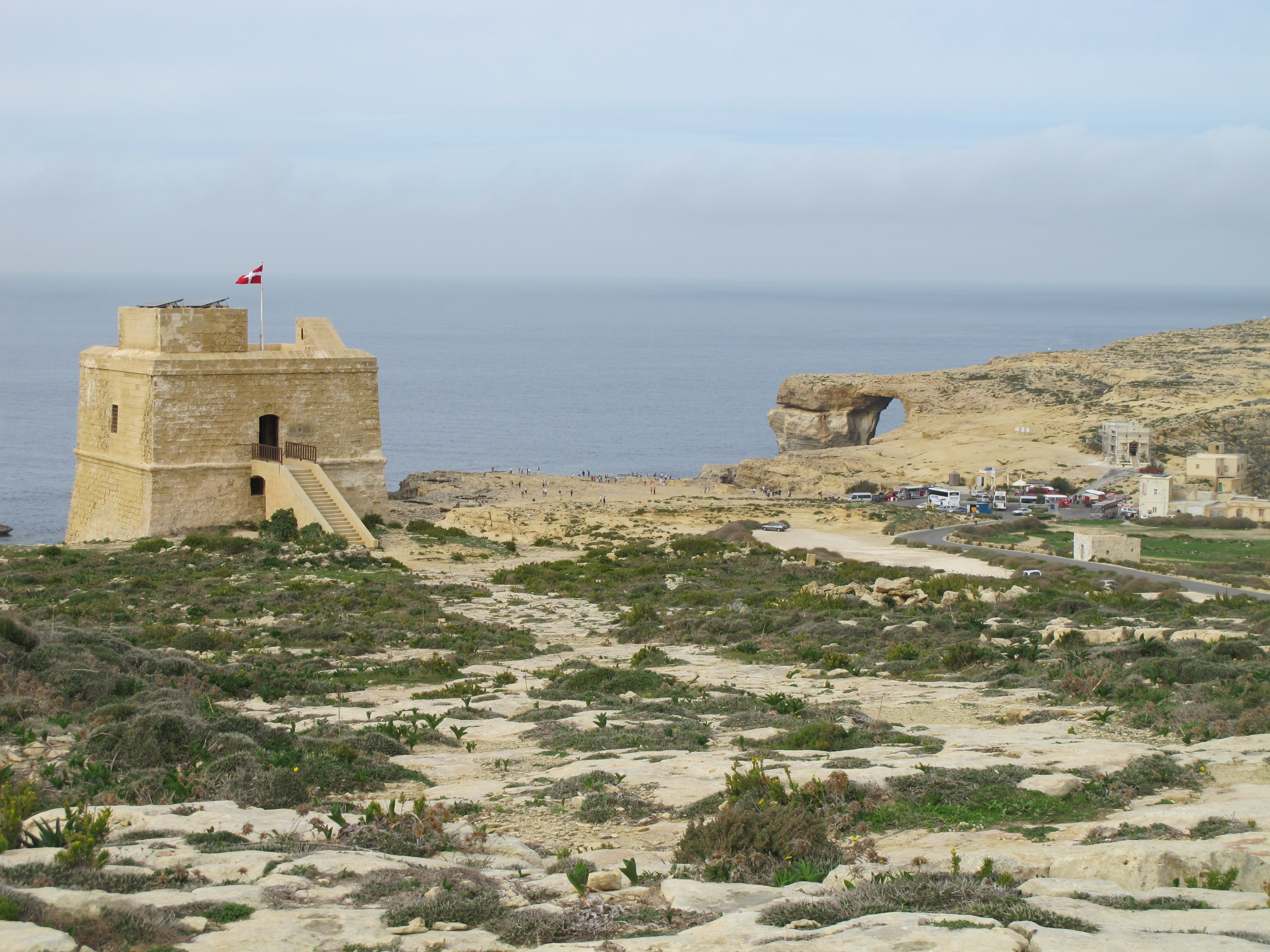
Dwejra Tower with the Azure Window in the background

The tower was restored by Din l-Art Ħelwa between 1997 and 1999. It is now in good condition and is open to the public at no charge.

== In popular culture ==
- Dwejra Tower was used in the filming of the 1963 film Treasure in Malta and the 1985 film Among Wolves.
