= List of monuments in St. Julian's =

This is a list of monuments in St. Julian's, Malta, which are listed on the National Inventory of the Cultural Property of the Maltese Islands.

== List ==
Name of object	Location	Coordinates	ID	Photo	Upload
Statue of St. Julians	130 Triq il-Kbira	35°55′08″N 14°29′25″E	00795	Statue of St. Julians	Upload Photo
Statue of the Sacred Heart of Jesus	Ix-Xatt ta' Spinola (roundabout)	35°55′07″N 14°29′23″E	00796	Statue of the Sacred Heart of Jesus	Upload Photo
Church of the Immaculate Conception	Triq San Ġorġ	35°55′12″N 14°29′25″E	00797	Church of the Immaculate Conception	Upload Photo
Church of St. Julians	Triq Lapsi c/w Triq Sant'Anġlu	35°54′59″N 14°29′24″E	00798	Church of St. Julians	Upload Photo
Statue of the Assumption	Triq Lapsi c/w Triq Sant'Anġlu	35°54′59″N 14°29′24″E	00799	Statue of the Assumption	Upload Photo
Niche of the Immaculate Conception	143 It-Telgħa ta'Birkirkara	35°55′00″N 14°29′33″E	00800	Niche of the Immaculate Conception	Upload Photo
Niche of the Madonna of Mount Carmel	12 Trejqet il-Bajja	35°54′54″N 14°29′33″E	00801	Niche of the Madonna of Mount Carmel	Upload Photo
Niche of St Joseph	107 It-Telgħa ta'Birkirkara	35°54′53″N 14°29′27″E	00802	Niche of St Joseph	Upload Photo
Niche of the Madonna of Mount Carmel	5 Triq Birkirkara	35°54′42″N 14°29′31″E	00803		Upload Photo
Church of the Madonna of Good Counsel	Triq il-Knisja	35°55′20″N 14°29′31″E	00804	Church of the Madonna of Good Counsel	Upload Photo
Church of Santa Rita	Sqaq Lourdes	35°55′28″N 14°29′13″E	00805	Church of Santa Rita	Upload Photo
Villa Leoni (demolition of garden and building, except façade, proposed	177 Triq il-Kbira	35°54′57″N 14°29′35″E	01210	Villa Leoni (demolition of garden and building, except façade, proposed	Upload Photo
Villa Priuli	42 Triq il-Kbira	35°54′52″N 14°29′36″E	01211	Villa Priuli	Upload Photo
Balluta Buildings	Telgħet San Ġiljan	35°54′50″N 14°29′40″E	01212	Balluta Buildings	Upload Photo
Villa Blanche	44 Triq il-Kbira	35°54′53″N 14°29′36″E	01213	Villa Blanche	Upload Photo
Villa Cassar Torregiani	40 Triq il-Kbira	35°54′51″N 14°29′36″E	01214	Villa Cassar Torregiani	Upload Photo
Villa Fieres	Triq Michelangelo Borġ	35°55′06″N 14°29′23″E	01215	Villa Fieres	Upload Photo
Villa Rosa	Triq in-Nemes	35°55′29″N 14°29′11″E	01216	Villa Rosa	Upload Photo
Spinola Palace	Triq San Ġużepp	35°55′12″N 14°29′26″E	01217	Spinola Palace	Upload Photo
Dragonara Palace	Triq Dragunara	35°55′35″N 14°29′41″E	01218	Dragonara Palace	Upload Photo
La Maltija Restaurant	1 Triq il-Knisja c/w 66 Triq il-Wilġa	35°55′24″N 14°29′32″E	01219	La Maltija Restaurant	Upload Photo
The Stables	3 Triq il-Knisja	35°55′24″N 14°29′32″E	01220	The Stables	Upload Photo
St. Julian's Band Club (interior demolished in 2018)	31 Triq San Ġorġ	35°55′10″N 14°29′23″E	01221	St. Julian's Band Club (interior demolished in 2018)	Upload Photo
St George's Bay Tower	Corinthia Hotel	35°55′44″N 14°29′27″E	01382	St George's Bay Tower	Upload Photo
Spinola Bay to St Georges Bay Entrenchment	Triq Spinola - Triq Wilġa - Triq Dragunara	35°55′22″N 14°29′38″E	01421	Spinola Bay to St Georges Bay Entrenchment	Upload Photo
St.Julians Entrenchment	Triq it-Torri from Balluta Bay to Exiles Bay	35°54′55″N 14°29′45″E	01422	St.Julians Entrenchment	Upload Photo
Palazzina Vincenti	188 Triq il-Kbira, Triq Ġorġ Borg Olivier u Wesgħet Ġużè Tanti	35°54′59″N 14°29′37″E	02587	more files	Upload Photo
	186–7 Triq il-Kbira u Wesgħet Ġużè Tanti	35°54′59″N 14°29′37″E	02588	more files	Upload Photo
	6 Ġorġ Borg Olivier	35°54′59″N 14°29′37″E	02589	more files	Upload Photo
