= Qawra Tower =

Qawra Tower & Battery
- Torri u Batterija tal-Qawra
- Part of the Lascaris towers
- Qawra, St. Paul's Bay, Malta
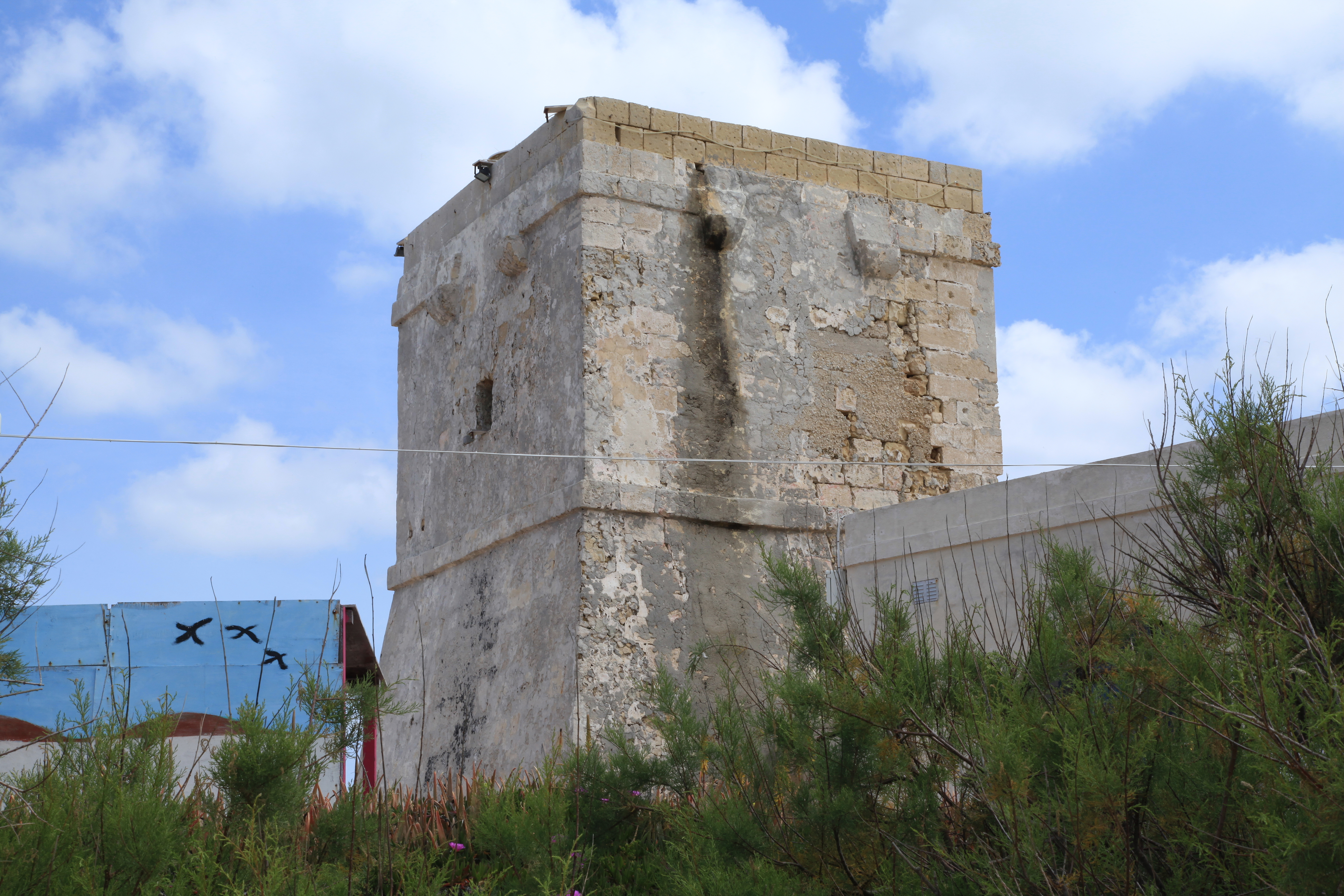
- Qawra Tower

Site information
- Type: Coastal watchtower Artillery battery
- Owner: Government of Malta
- Controlled by: Ta' Fra Ben Restaurant & Lounge Bar
- Open to the public: Yes (as a restaurant)
- Condition: Intact

Location
- Coordinates: 35°57′33.17″N 14°25′28.71″E
- Height: 11 m

Site history
- Built: 1638 (tower); 1715 (battery)
- Built by: Order of Saint John
- Materials: Limestone

Qawra Tower (Maltese: Torri tal-Qawra), also known as Qawra Point Tower (Maltese: Torri ta' Ras il-Qawra) or Fra Ben Tower (Maltese: Torri ta' Fra Ben), is a small watchtower in Qawra, limits of St. Paul's Bay, Malta. It was completed in 1638 as the fourth of the Lascaris towers. An artillery battery was built around the tower in 1715. Today, the tower and battery are a restaurant.

== History ==
Qawra Tower was built in 1638 near the tip of Qawra Point, commanding the entrance to St. Paul's Bay to the west and Salina Bay to the east. It was built on or near the site of a medieval watch post. Since 1659, it has had Għallis Tower in its line of sight. This linked Qawra Tower with the De Redin towers that allowed communication from Gozo to Valletta.

The tower's design is similar to the other Lascaris towers, with two floors each having a single room. Access to the upper floor was originally by a wooden ladder or scala di corda.

In 1715, a semi-circular gun battery was built around the seaward side of the tower. The battery had a low parapet, with guns being mounted en barbette. There were two blockhouses, which were linked by a V-shaped redan containing the main gate. Both the blockhouses and the redan were pierced with musketry loopholes.

An entrenchment wall was built close to the tower and battery in the 1760s, and parts of it can still be seen.

The tower was included on the Antiquities List of 1925.

Before World War II, the battery was fitted with two concrete gun emplacements. A pillbox was also built nearby.

== Present day ==
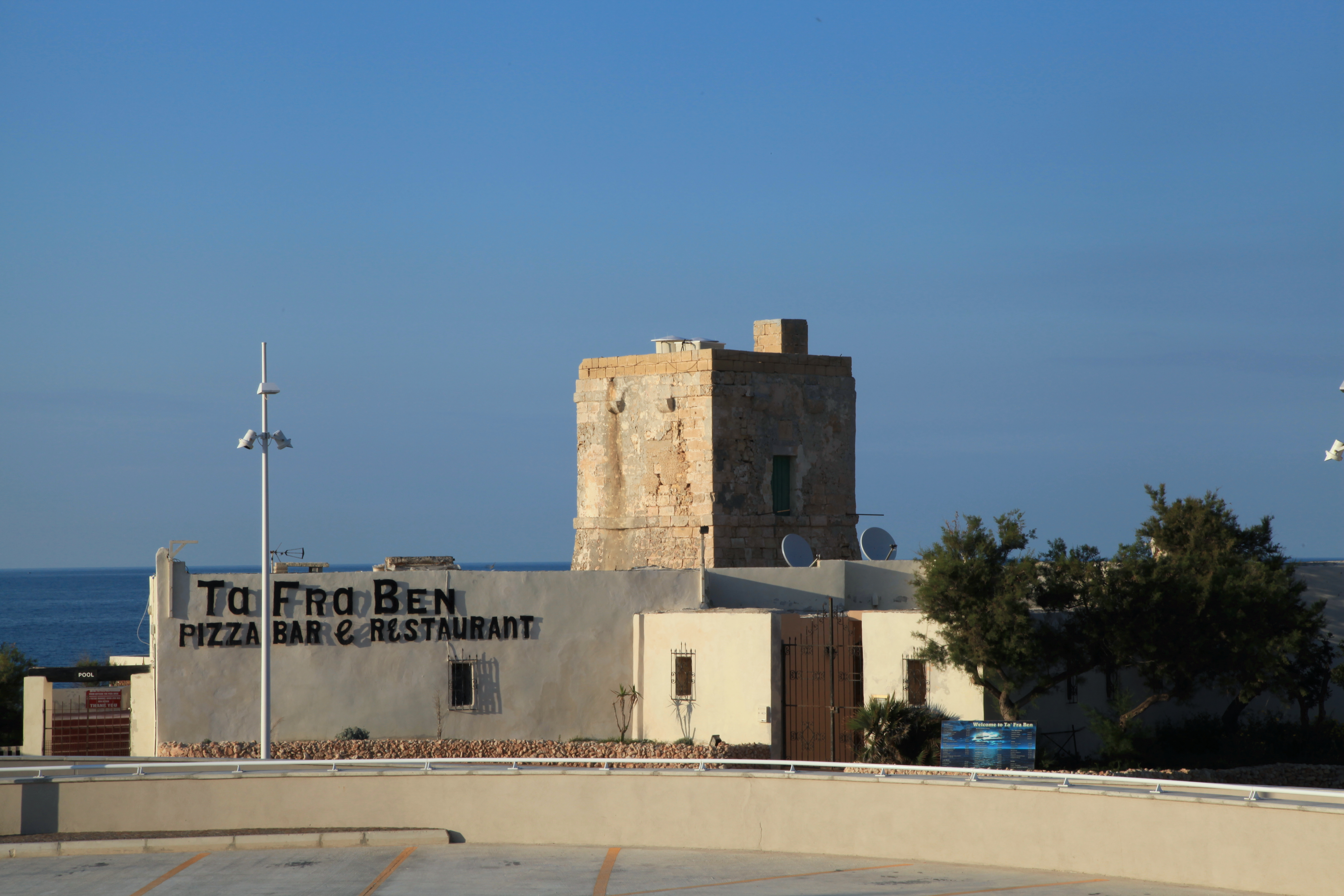
One of the blockhouses and the redan, which now serve as the entrance to the restaurant

Today, the tower is a restaurant, while the heavily altered battery serves as a swimming pool. The tower is slightly dilapidated, having been plastered with cement at some time, which is now flaking away, and has had water tanks and rough additional brickwork added to its roof.
