= Għajn Tuffieħa =

- Riviera
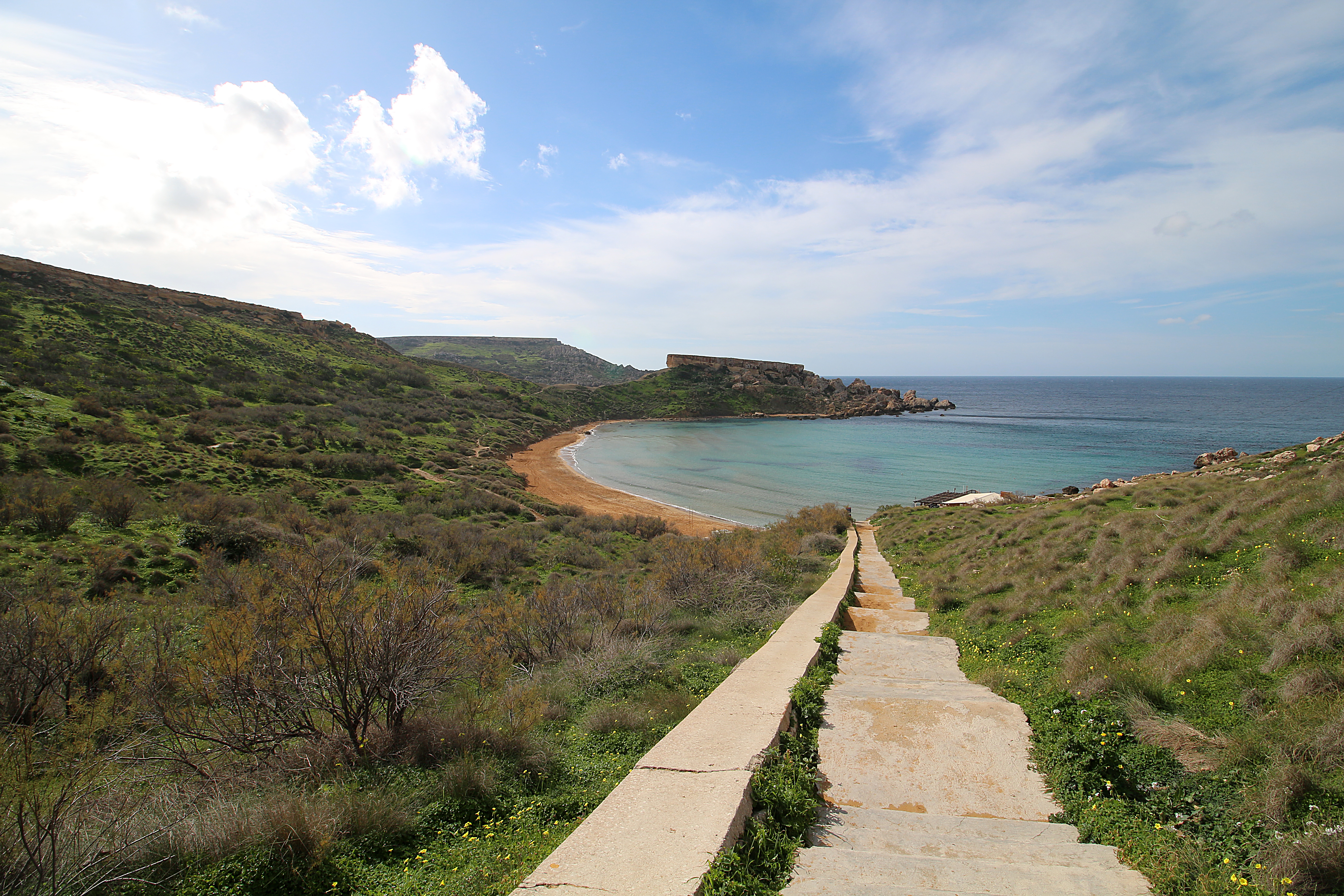
- The 187 steps leading to the beach.

- Location of the bay in Malta
- Location: Mġarr, Malta
- Group: Mediterranean Sea
- Coordinates: 35°55′45″N 14°20′36″E
- Type: Bay
- Basin countries: Malta
- Max. length: 290 metres (950 ft)
- Max. width: 205 metres (673 ft)
- Surface area: 5.43 hectares (64,900 yd^{2})
- Average depth: 6.9 metres (23 ft)
- Max. depth: 16.4 metres (54 ft)
- Water volume: 410,000 cubic metres (14,000,000 ft^{3})
- Surface elevation: 0 metres (0 ft)

Għajn Tuffieħa (lit. 'Spring of Apples'), commonly called Riviera and frequently mistranslated as Apple's Eye in English, is a bay and sandy, red beach which is located in Mġarr, Malta. The bay is 345 metres (377 yd) south of Golden Bay. It is less busy than Golden Bay and often visited by Maltese natives as well as tourists. To reach this beach, one needs to descend a hill on a staircase of 200 steps. On top of the cliffs west of Għajn Tuffieħa bay is the Għajn Tuffieħa Tower, one of the seven towers built by Grand Master Giovanni Paolo Lascaris, of the Knights Hospitaller.

Overlooking the bay is the former Riviera Martinique Hotel, which closed in 1988. The unofficial name Riviera derives from the hotel.

In Għajn Tuffieħa is a café, Singita Miracle Beach, located at the foot of the access staircase. In June 2024 there was some controversy over the café placing large towels on parts of the beach.

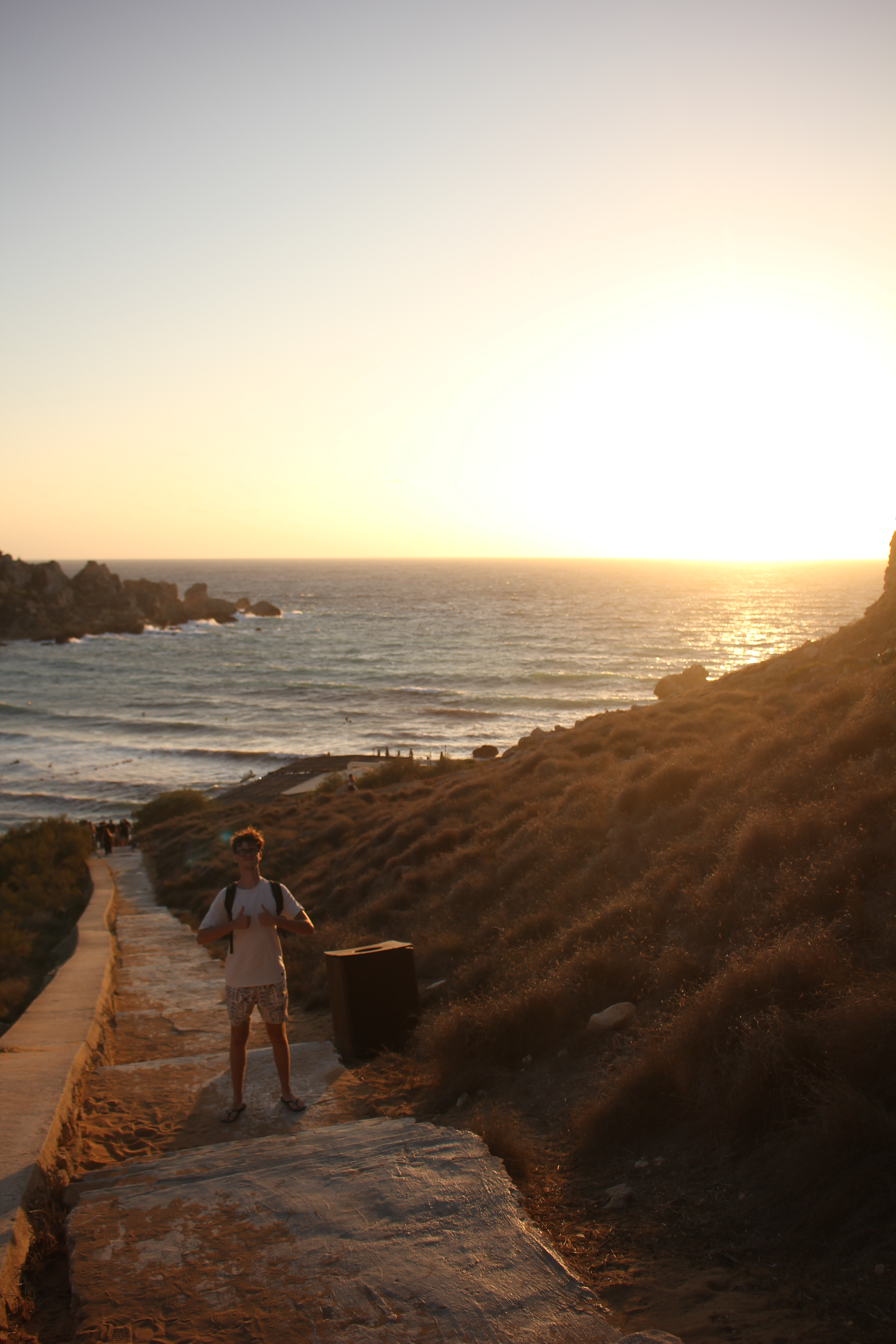
The stairs to the bay

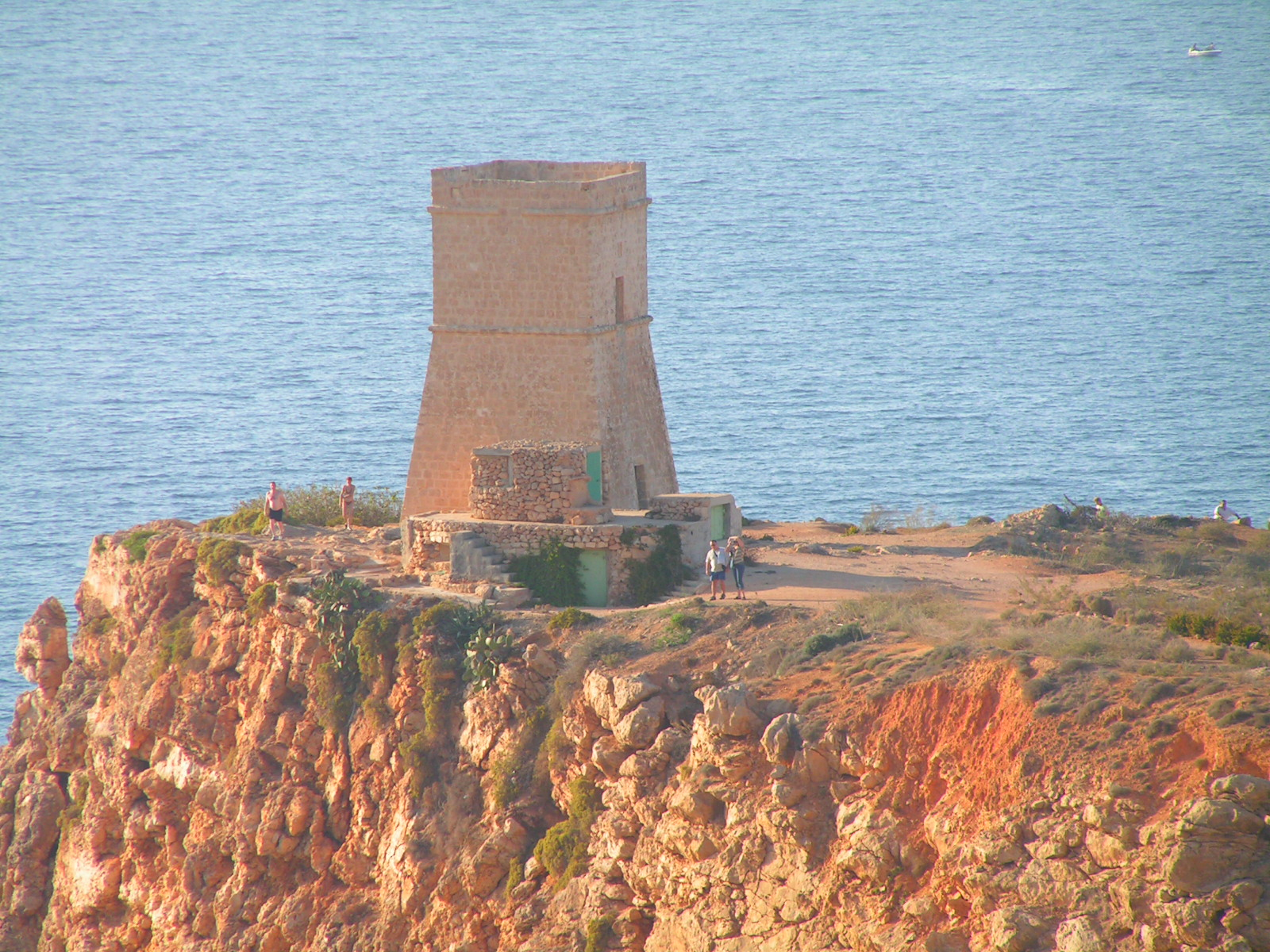
The Għajn Tuffieħa Tower.

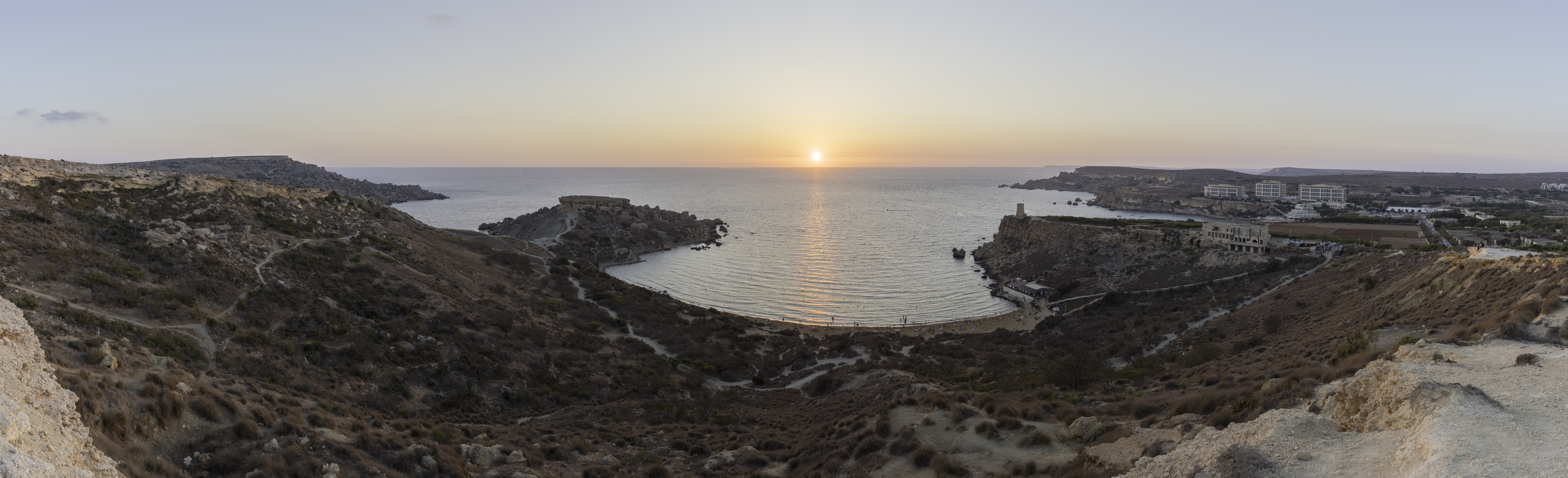
Panoramic view.

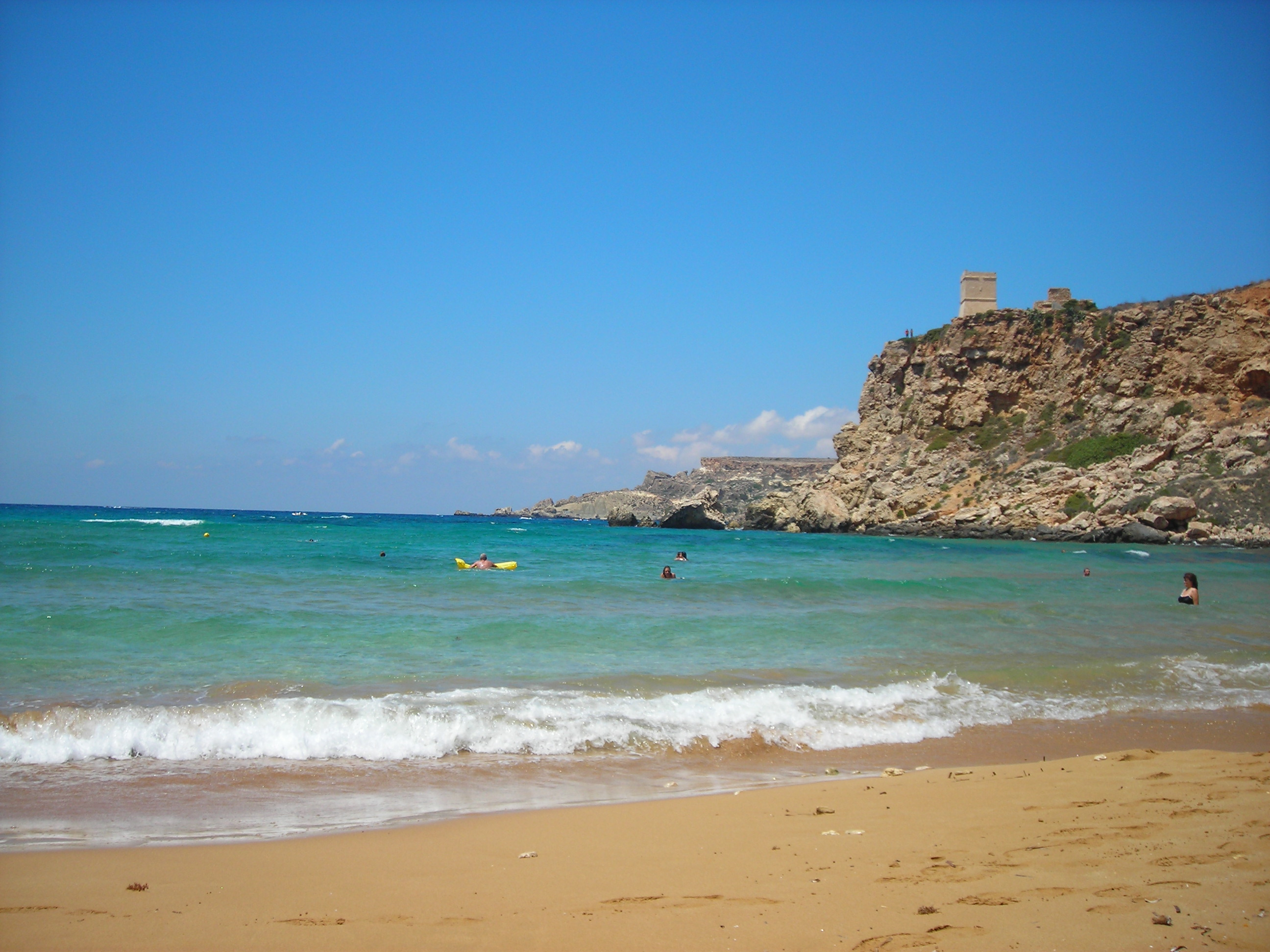
The bay with the tower on the headland.

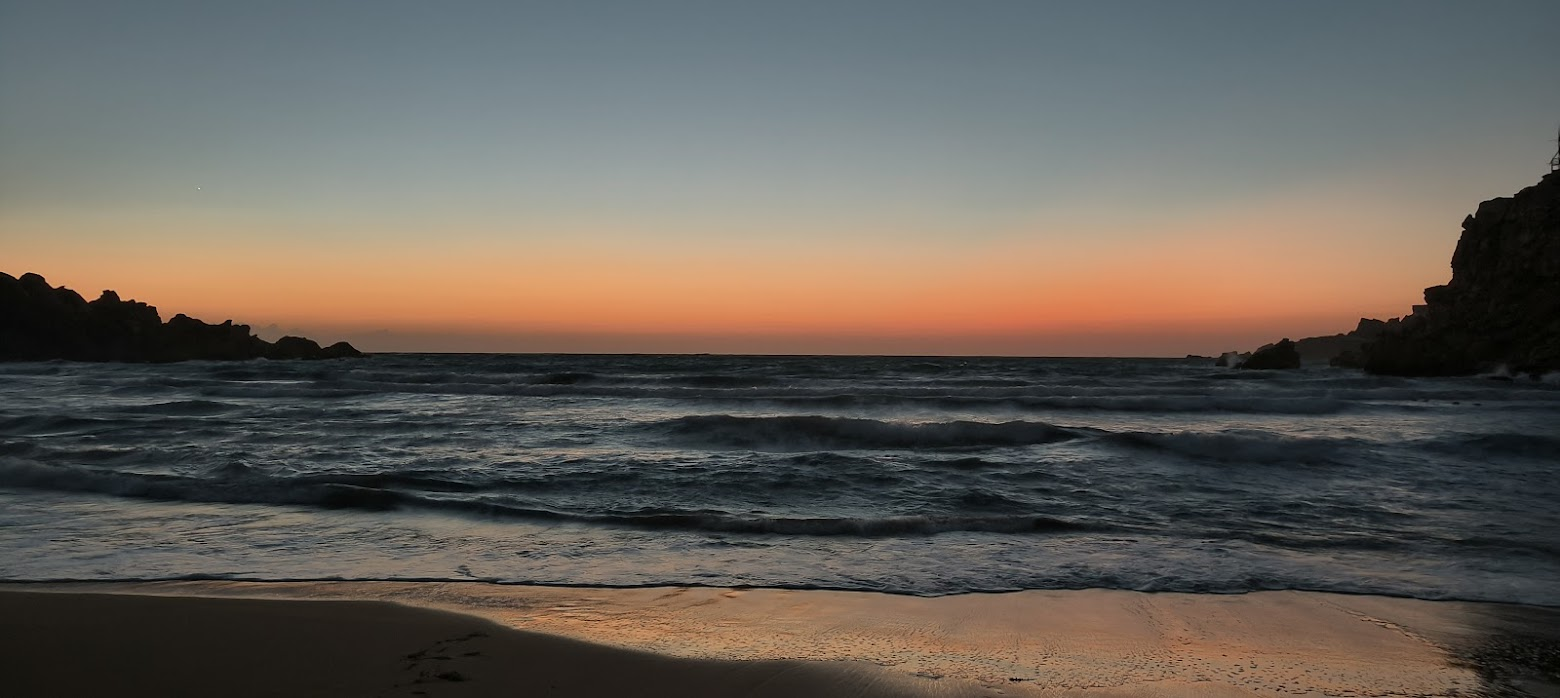
Beach after sunset
