= Għajn Tuffieħa Tower =

- Torri t'Għajn Tuffieħa
- Part of the Lascaris towers
- Mġarr, Malta
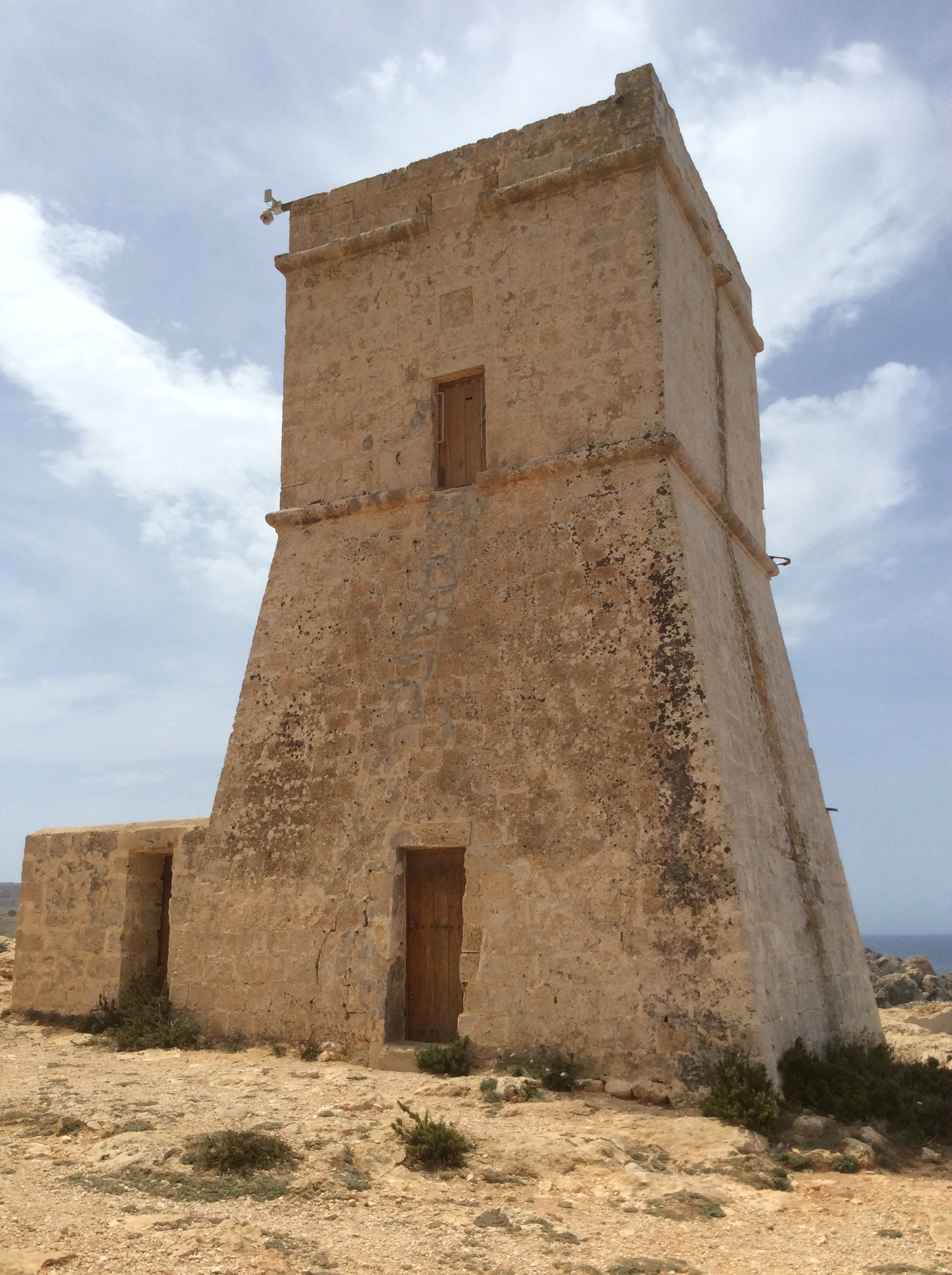
- Għajn Tuffieħa Tower

Site information
- Type: Coastal watchtower
- Owner: Government of Malta
- Open to the public: No
- Condition: Mostly intact

Location
- Coordinates: 35°55′51.33″N 14°20′36.65″E
- Height: 11 m (36 ft)

Site history
- Built: 1637
- Built by: Order of Saint John
- Materials: Limestone

Għajn Tuffieħa Tower (Maltese: Torri t'Għajn Tuffieħa) is a small watchtower in Għajn Tuffieħa, limits of Mġarr, Malta. It was completed in 1637 as the second of the Lascaris towers. The tower is mostly intact although it is threatened by coastal erosion and was damaged during a storm in 2023.

== History ==
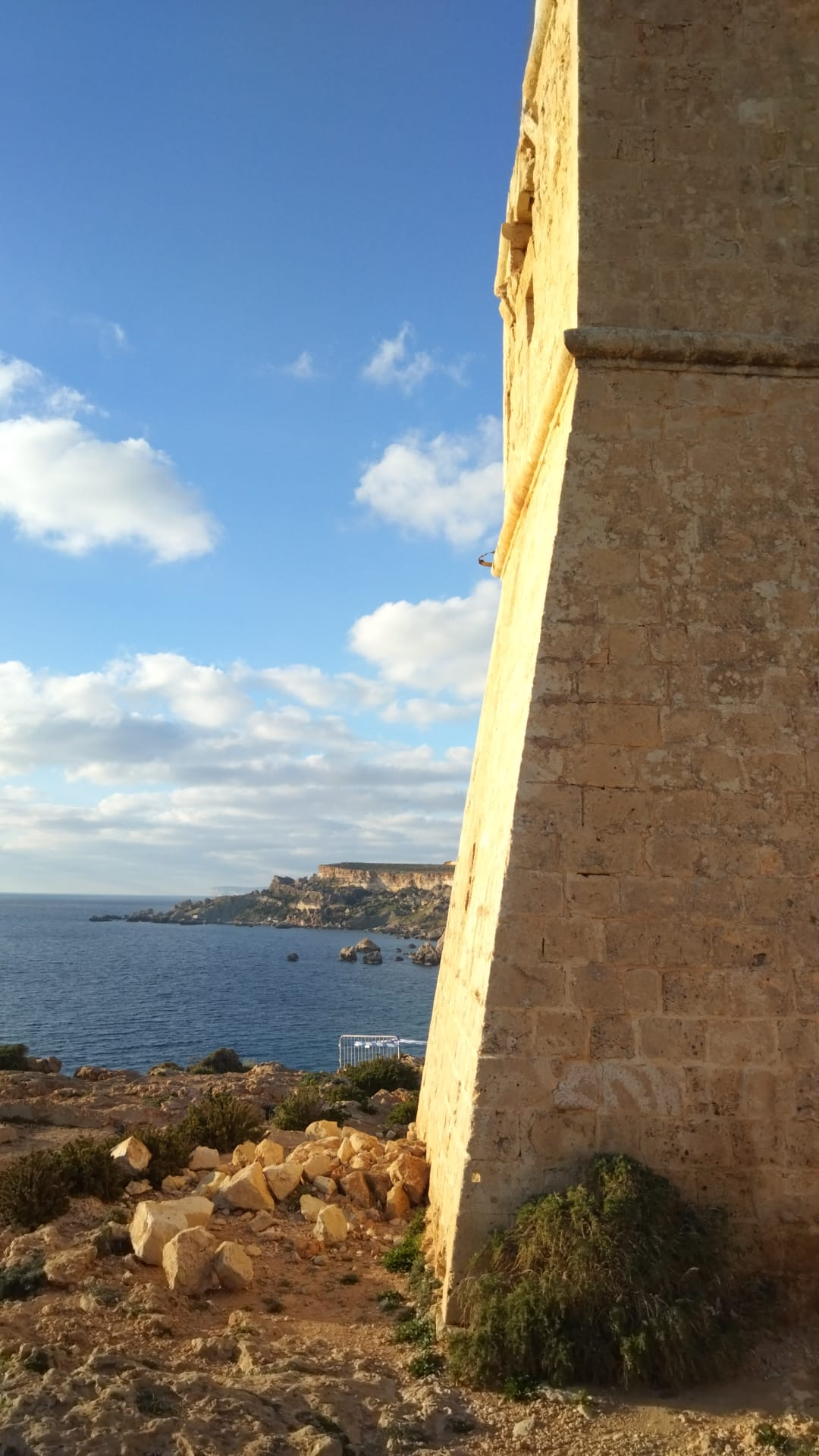
View of the damage after the 2023 cyclone

Għajn Tuffieħa Tower was built in 1637 on the cliffs overlooking Għajn Tuffieħa Bay close to Mellieħa and Mġarr on the northwest coast of Malta. The tower has Lippija and Nadur Towers in its line of sight.

The tower was designed by the Italian architect Vincenzo Maculani. It is almost identical to Lippija Tower, having a square plan and two floors topped by a flat roof with a parapet. Each floor has a single room, and access to the upper floor was originally by a wooden ladder.

Għajn Tuffieħa Tower was built on the site of a medieval watch post. It was originally armed with a ½-pounder gun, and its garrison consisted of a captain and three men, who were paid by the Università, the government officials in charge of Malta at the time.

== Present day ==
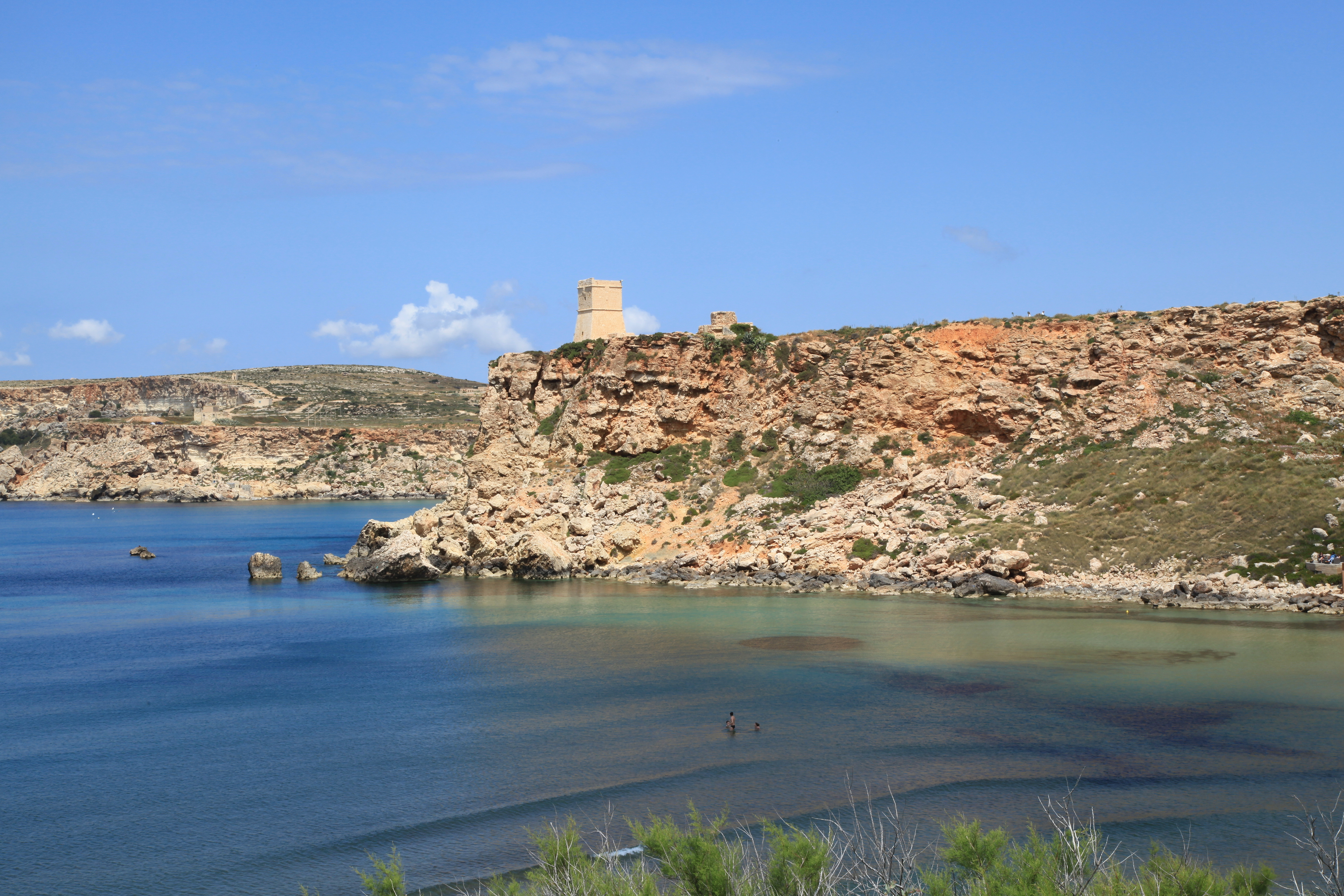
The tower overlooking Għajn Tuffieħa

The tower was in poor condition until it was restored in 2000 with the support of the Director of Public Projects and Din l-Art Ħelwa. In 2012, vandals sprayed graffiti on two sides of the tower; this has since been removed.

The tower continued to be renovated by the Gaia Foundation, and it opened to the public in 2013 as part of a peace grove containing over 20 species of indigenous plants. The Gaia Foundation is reportedly no longer active, and as of 2023 there is no entity responsible for the tower's upkeep.

The tower is threatened by coastal erosion, and cracks can be seen on the cliffs upon which the tower is built. The terrain may be dangerous for walkers, as some people have lost their life on the rocks in the immediate vicinity of the tower.

During the night of 9–10 February 2023, the tower was damaged during Cyclone Helios. Some of its masonry collapsed amidst gale-force winds and heavy rain, leaving a hole within the tower's upper section.
