= Lippija Tower =

Small watchtower in Gnejna, Malta

- Torri ta' Lippija
- Part of the Lascaris towers
- Mġarr, Malta
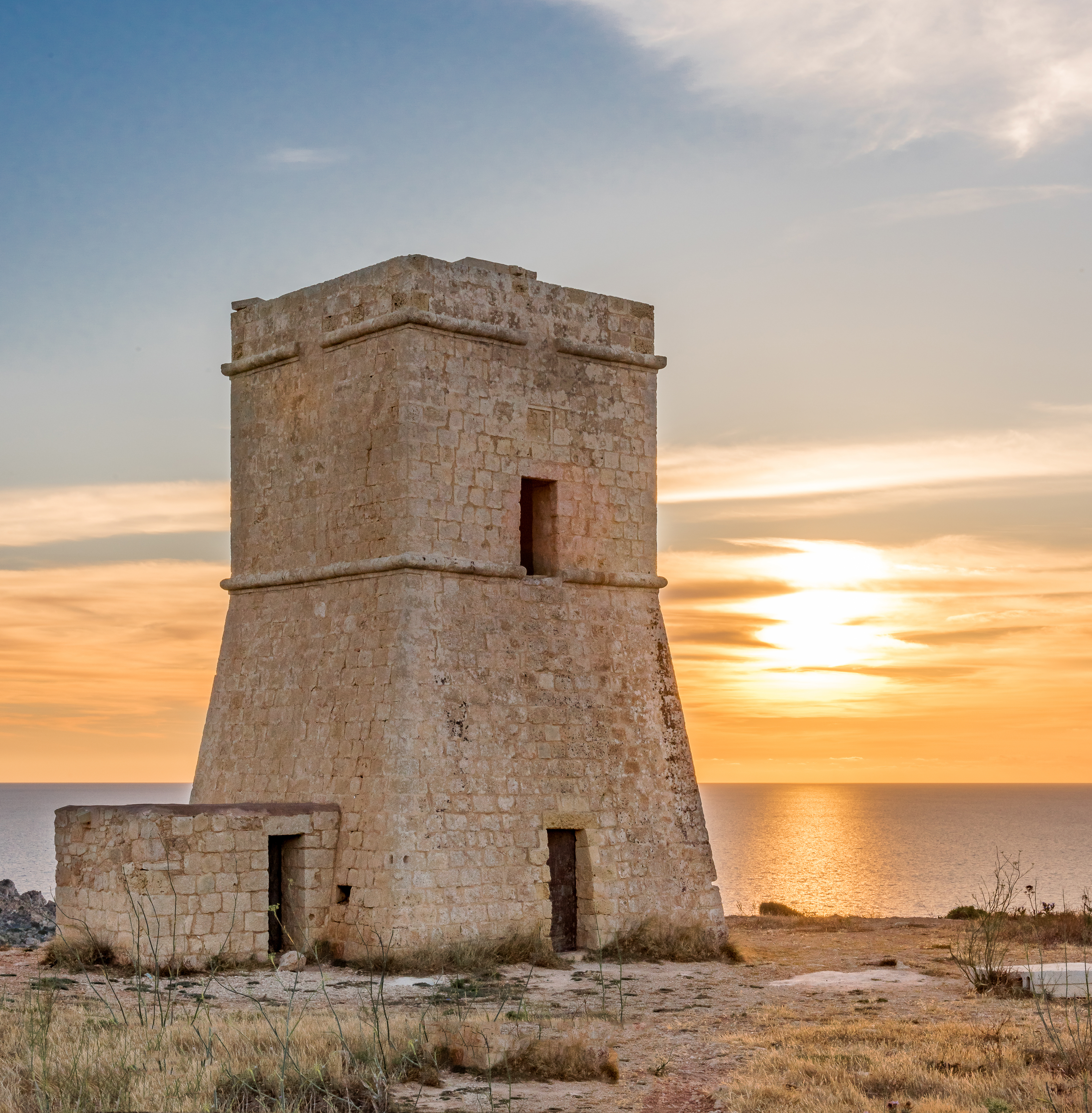
- View of Lippija Tower

Site information
- Type: Coastal watchtower
- Owner: Government of Malta
- Condition: Intact

Location
- Coordinates: 35°55′20.25″N 14°20′45.65″E
- Height: 11 m

Site history
- Built: 1637
- Built by: Order of Saint John
- Materials: Limestone

Lippija Tower (Maltese: Torri ta' Lippija), also known as Ġnejna Tower (Maltese: Torri tal-Ġnejna), is a small watchtower in Ġnejna Bay, limits of Mġarr, Malta. It was completed in 1637 as the first of the Lascaris towers. After restoration in 2003, the tower is in good condition.

== History ==
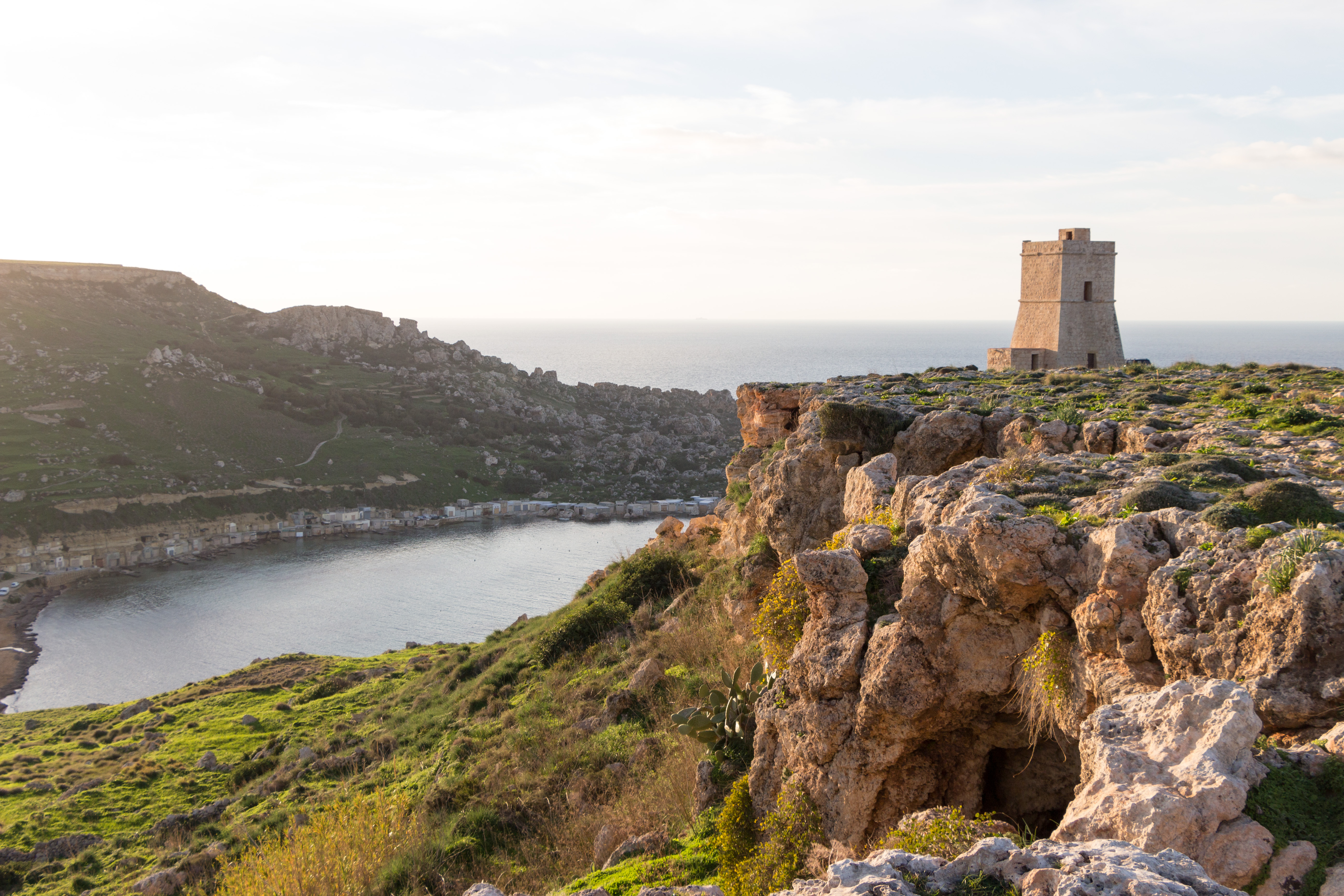
Lippija Tower overlooking Ġnejna Bay

Lippija Tower was built in 1637 on the edge of Wardija Ridge overlooking Ġnejna Bay on the northwest coast of Malta. The tower has Għajn Tuffieħa and Nadur Towers in its line of sight. The construction of the tower was personally financed by Giovanni Paolo Lascaris.

The tower was built on the site of a medieval watch post. It was designed by the Italian architect Vincenzo Maculani. It is almost identical to Għajn Tuffieħa Tower, having a square plan and two floors topped by a flat roof with a parapet. Each floor has a single room, and access to the upper floor was originally by a wooden ladder.

Originally the tower was known as Torre del Migiarro and had a chapel dedicated to Santa Agatha.

== Present day ==
By the early 2000s, Lippija Tower was abandoned and it was in danger of collapsing. It was restored by the Ministry of Resources and Infrastructure in 2003, and it is now in good condition.
