= Nadur Tower =

Watchtower in Malta; Lascaris tower

- Torri tan-Nadur
- Part of the Lascaris towers
- Rabat, Malta
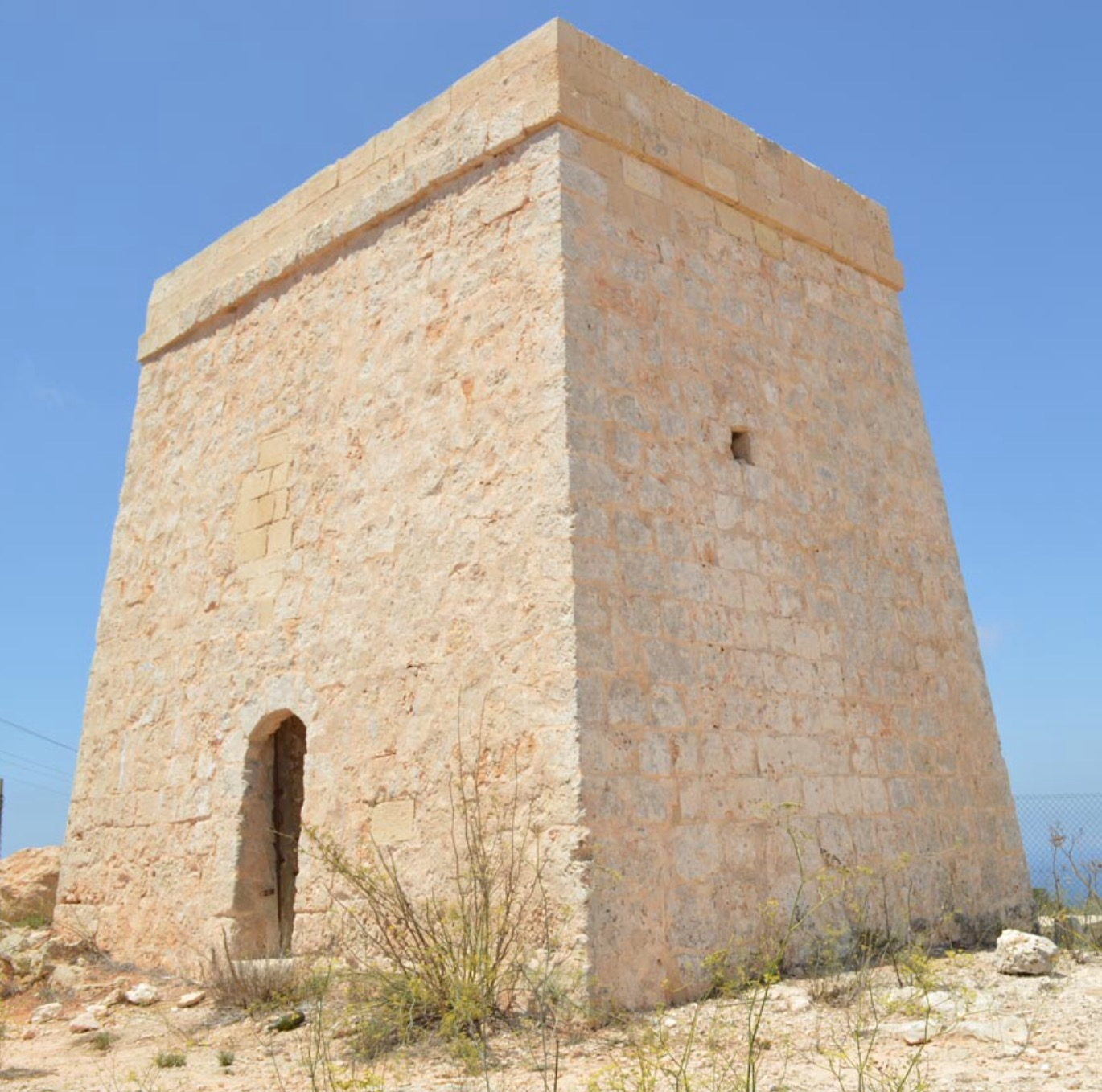
- Nadur Tower in 2016

Site information
- Type: Watchtower
- Owner: Government of Malta
- Condition: Intact

Location
- Coordinates: 35°54′2.1″N 14°22′16.1″E

Site history
- Built: 1637
- Built by: Order of Saint John
- Materials: Limestone

Nadur Tower (Maltese: Torri tan-Nadur) is a small watchtower in Binġemma Gap, within the limits of Rabat, Malta. It was completed in 1637 as the third of the Lascaris towers. Today, the tower is in good condition.

== History ==
Nadur Tower was built in 1637 at Binġemma Gap, close to where the British later built the Victoria Lines. Unlike the other Lascaris towers, it is located inland, far away from the coast. This is because it was built to serve as a 'relay' station between the newly constructed Lippija and Għajn Tuffieħa Towers and the walled city of Mdina. The tower has views of the western part of the island of Malta.

The tower is smaller than the other Lascaris towers, having one floor instead of two. It has a square base with two rooms. Access to the roof was by a wooden ladder, which has been replaced by iron rungs stapled to the wall.

In September 2008, the tower was damaged when vandals threw burnt oil on one of its sides, but it was restored after a couple of days. The government and a number of political parties condemned the act of vandalism
