= List of fortifications in Malta =

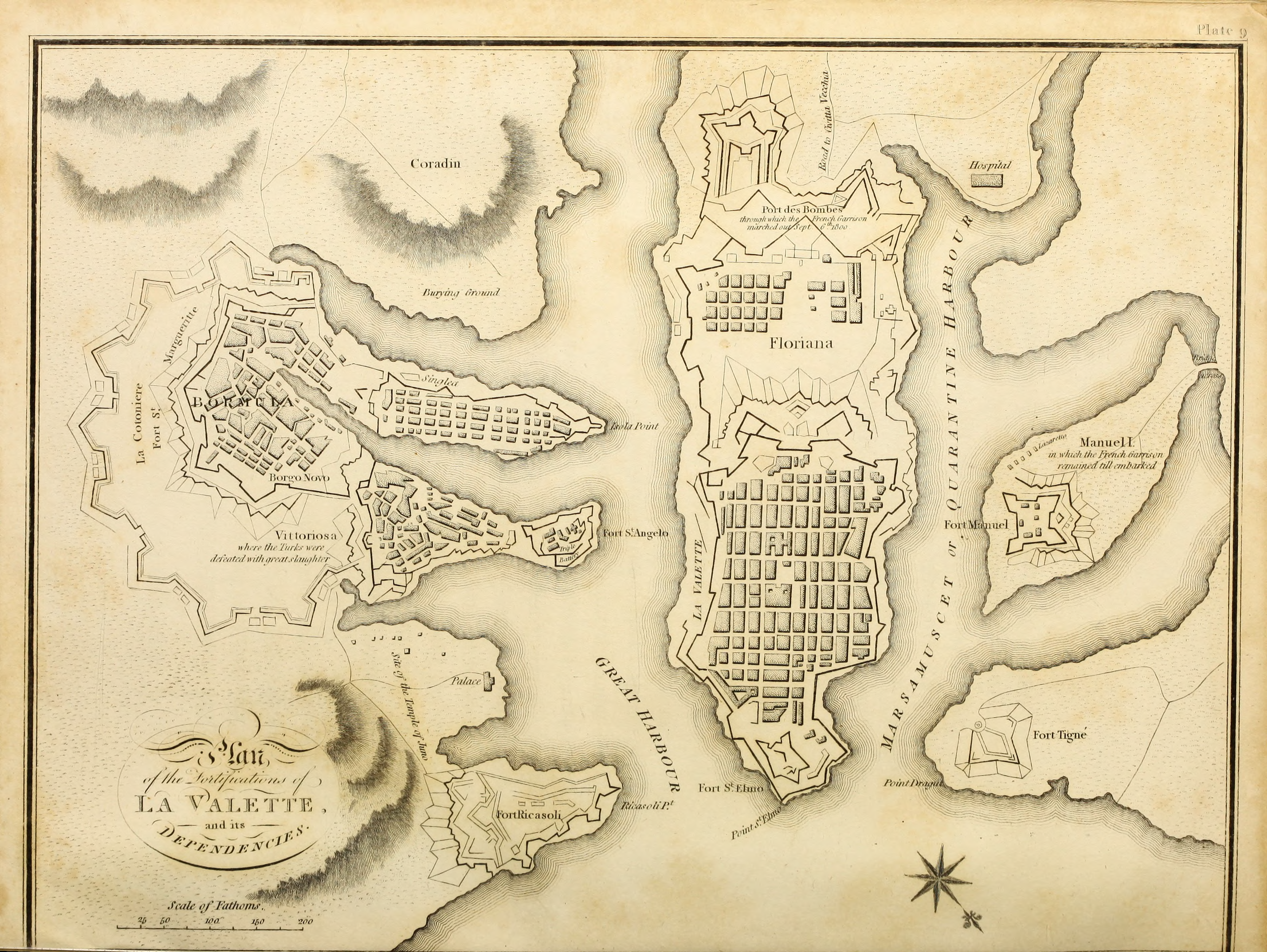
Map of the fortifications of the Grand Harbour and Marsamxett in 1803.

This is a list of fortifications of Malta.

== Prehistoric fortifications ==
Name	Image	Location	Built	Status
Baħrija		Rabat	Bronze Age	Scant remains
Borġ in-Nadur		Birżebbuġa	c.1450 BC	One bastion intact
Nuffara		Xagħra	Bronze Age	Scant remains
Qortin		St. Paul's Bay	Bronze Age	Scant remains
Ras il-Ġebel		Mġarr	Bronze Age	Scant remains
Wardija ta' San Ġorġ		Siġġiewi	Bronze Age	Scant remains

== Walled cities ==
Name	Image	Location	Built	Builder	Status
Birgu		Birgu	c.13th–18th centuries	(Sovereign Military Order of Malta) Order of Saint John	Mostly intact, undergoing restoration
Cittadella		Victoria	Antiquity–1622	Crown of Aragon (Sovereign Military Order of Malta) Order of Saint John	Intact. According to Ramon Muntaner (1283) a prominent Aragonite tower existed on the site in the whereabouts of the arch/remains of a Siculo-Norman style villa. A number of outer towers were places outside the Citadel.
Cottonera Lines		Cospicua; Birgu	1670–18th century	(Sovereign Military Order of Malta) Order of Saint John	Mostly intact
Floriana Lines		Floriana	1635–18th century	(Sovereign Military Order of Malta) Order of Saint John	Mostly intact
Mdina		Mdina	Antiquity–1746	(Sovereign Military Order of Malta) Order of Saint John	Intact, restored
Santa Margherita Lines		Cospicua	1638–1736	(Sovereign Military Order of Malta) Order of Saint John (Note: Some alterations were made by the United Kingdom)	Partially intact
Senglea		Senglea	1552–18th century	(Sovereign Military Order of Malta) Order of Saint John	Partially intact
Valletta		Valletta	1566–1570s	(Sovereign Military Order of Malta) Order of Saint John	Mostly intact, partially restored

== Forts ==
Name	Image	Location	Built	Builder	Status
Fort Benghisa		Birżebbuġa	1910–1912	United Kingdom	Intact, neglected
Fort Binġemma		Rabat	1875–1878	United Kingdom	Intact, illegally occupied
Fort Campbell		Mellieħa	1937–1938	United Kingdom	Ruins
Fort Chambray		Għajnsielem	1749–1760s	(Sovereign Military Order of Malta) Order of Saint John	Intact, redeveloped
Fort Delimara		Marsaxlokk	1876–1888	United Kingdom	Intact, restoration proposed
Fort Leonardo		Żabbar	1872–1878	United Kingdom	Intact, restoration proposed
Fort Madalena		Swieqi	1878–1880	United Kingdom	Intact, used as a rescue corps headquarters and training school
Fort Manoel		Gżira	1723–1733	(Sovereign Military Order of Malta) Order of Saint John	Intact, restored
Fort Mellieħa		Mellieħa	1940s	United Kingdom	Intact, restored
Fort Mosta		Mosta	1878–1880s	United Kingdom	Intact, used as an ammunition depot
Fort Pembroke		Pembroke	1875–1878	United Kingdom	Intact, used as a school
Fort Ricasoli		Kalkara	1670–1693	(Sovereign Military Order of Malta) Order of Saint John	Intact, neglected
Fort Saint Angelo		Birgu	13th century–1690s	(Sovereign Military Order of Malta) Order of Saint John	Intact, undergoing restoration
Fort Saint Elmo		Valletta	1552–1570s	(Sovereign Military Order of Malta) Order of Saint John	Intact, restored
Fort San Lucian		Marsaxlokk	1872–1878	United Kingdom (Note: The fort was built around a tower of the Order of Saint John.)	Intact, used as an aquaculture research centre
Fort Saint Michael		Senglea	1552–1581	(Sovereign Military Order of Malta) Order of Saint John	Demolished, part of the base survives
Fort Saint Rocco		Kalkara	1872–1900	United Kingdom	Intact
Fort San Salvatore		Birgu	1724	(Sovereign Military Order of Malta) Order of Saint John	Intact, neglected
Fort Tas-Silġ		Marsaxlokk	1879–1883	United Kingdom	Intact, used as an animal sanctuary
Fort Tigné		Sliema	1793–1795	(Sovereign Military Order of Malta) Order of Saint John	Intact, restored
Fort Verdala		Cospicua	1852–1856	United Kingdom	Intact, used as housing estates and a school

== Towers ==
Name	Image	Location	Built	Builder	Status
Castro Interiore		Birgu	c. 1274	Angevins	Modified
Birgu Clock Tower		Birgu	Medieval-Order of St John		Modified to be used as a clock tower and then destroyed in WWII
Burmarrad Tower		Burmarrad	1494		Replaced by another tower in 1618 in the close proximity
Aħrax Tower		Mellieħa	1658	(Sovereign Military Order of Malta) Order of Saint John	Intact, abandoned
Bengħisa Tower		Birżebbuġa	1659	(Sovereign Military Order of Malta) Order of Saint John	Demolished
Birkirkara Tower		Birkirkara	c. 16th century		Intact
Blat Mogħża Tower		Mġarr	c. 1637	(Sovereign Military Order of Malta) Order of Saint John	Collapsed
Captain's Tower		Naxxar	c. 1550s	(Sovereign Military Order of Malta) Order of Saint John	Intact
Cavalier Tower		Qrendi	Unknown	Unknown	Intact
Delimara Tower		Marsaxlokk	1659	(Sovereign Military Order of Malta) Order of Saint John	Demolished
Dwejra Tower		San Lawrenz	1652	(Sovereign Military Order of Malta) Order of Saint John	Intact, restored
Garzes Tower		Għajnsielem	1605–1607	(Sovereign Military Order of Malta) Order of Saint John	Demolished
Għajn Ħadid Tower		Mellieħa	1658	(Sovereign Military Order of Malta) Order of Saint John	Ruins
Għajn Tuffieħa Tower		Mġarr	1637	(Sovereign Military Order of Malta) Order of Saint John	Intact, restored
Għallis Tower		Naxxar	1658	(Sovereign Military Order of Malta) Order of Saint John	Intact, restored
Ħamrija Tower		Qrendi	1659	(Sovereign Military Order of Malta) Order of Saint John	Intact, restored
Isopu Tower		Nadur	1667	(Sovereign Military Order of Malta) Order of Saint John	Intact, restored
Lippija Tower		Mġarr	1637	(Sovereign Military Order of Malta) Order of Saint John	Intact, restored
Madliena Tower		Pembroke	1658	(Sovereign Military Order of Malta) Order of Saint John	Intact, restored
Marsalforn Tower		Xagħra	1614–1616	(Sovereign Military Order of Malta) Order of Saint John	Collapsed, some ruins remain
Mġarr ix-Xini Tower		Għajnsielem	1661	(Sovereign Military Order of Malta) Order of Saint John	Intact, restored
Nadur Tower		Rabat	1637	(Sovereign Military Order of Malta) Order of Saint John	Intact
Orsi Tower		Kalkara	1629	(Sovereign Military Order of Malta) Order of Saint John	Destroyed
Qawra Tower		St. Paul's Bay	1638	(Sovereign Military Order of Malta) Order of Saint John	Intact, used as a restaurant
Saint Agatha's Tower		Mellieħa	1647–1649	(Sovereign Military Order of Malta) Order of Saint John	Intact
Saint George's Tower		St. Julian's	1638	(Sovereign Military Order of Malta) Order of Saint John	Intact, in the grounds of a hotel
Saint Julian's Tower		Sliema	1658	(Sovereign Military Order of Malta) Order of Saint John	Intact, used as a restaurant
Saint Lucian Tower		Marsaxlokk	1610–1611	(Sovereign Military Order of Malta) Order of Saint John	Intact, used as an aquaculture research centre
Saint Mark's Tower		Naxxar	1658	(Sovereign Military Order of Malta) Order of Saint John	Intact, restored
Saint Mary's Tower		Għajnsielem	1618	(Sovereign Military Order of Malta) Order of Saint John	Intact, restored
Santa Maria delle Grazie Tower		Xgħajra	1620	(Sovereign Military Order of Malta) Order of Saint John	Demolished
Saint Thomas Tower		Marsaskala	1614	(Sovereign Military Order of Malta) Order of Saint John	Intact
Sciuta Tower		Qrendi	1638	(Sovereign Military Order of Malta) Order of Saint John	Intact, restoration planned
Torre dello Standardo		Mdina	1725-1726	(Sovereign Military Order of Malta) Order of Saint John	Intact
Tal-Għassiewi Tower		Zabbar		Arab period	Ruins
Tal-Wejter Tower		Birkirkara	17th or 18th century	(Sovereign Military Order of Malta) Order of Saint John	Intact
Triq il-Wiesgħa Tower		Żabbar	1659	(Sovereign Military Order of Malta) Order of Saint John	Intact, restored
Wardija Tower		Żurrieq	1659	(Sovereign Military Order of Malta) Order of Saint John	Intact
Wignacourt Tower		St. Paul's Bay	1610	(Sovereign Military Order of Malta) Order of Saint John	Intact, used as a museum
Xlendi Tower		Munxar	1650	(Sovereign Military Order of Malta) Order of Saint John	Intact, undergoing restoration
Xrobb l-Għaġin Tower		Marsaxlokk	1659	(Sovereign Military Order of Malta) Order of Saint John	Ruins
Żonqor Tower		Marsaskala	1659	(Sovereign Military Order of Malta) Order of Saint John	Demolished
Għajn Żnuber Tower		Mellieħa	Unknown	Possible a dejma post in origins; present structure a 19th-century watch tower	Intact, partially restored and partially reconstructed
Wied Żnuber Tower		Birżebbuġa	16th century	(Sovereign Military Order of Malta) Order of Saint John	Unknown (no longer exists)

Notes:

- For privately built towers, see List of fortifications of Malta#Fortified houses and privately built towers.

== Batteries ==
Name	Image	Location	Built (Note: Some dates are approximate)	Builder	Status
Aħrax Tower & Battery		Mellieħa	1715	(Sovereign Military Order of Malta) Order of Saint John	Intact, abandoned
Arrias Battery		St. Paul's Bay	1715	(Sovereign Military Order of Malta) Order of Saint John	Intact, used as a restaurant
Balbani Battery		Birżebbuġa	1715	(Sovereign Military Order of Malta) Order of Saint John	Demolished
Buġibba Battery		St. Paul's Bay	1715	(Sovereign Military Order of Malta) Order of Saint John	Demolished, ditch survives
Cambridge Battery		Sliema	1878–1886	United Kingdom	Intact, restoration planned
Capuchin Convent Battery		Kalkara	1799	Maltese insurgents	Demolished
Corradino Batteries		Paola	1798–1799	Maltese insurgents	Demolished
Delimara Tower & Battery		Marsaxlokk	1793	(Sovereign Military Order of Malta) Order of Saint John	Demolished
Della Grazie Battery		Xgħajra	1888–1893	United Kingdom	Intact, restoration planned
Dellia Battery		St. Paul's Bay	1715	(Sovereign Military Order of Malta) Order of Saint John	Demolished
Elminiech Battery		Birżebbuġa	1715	(Sovereign Military Order of Malta) Order of Saint John	Demolished
Fedeau Battery		Mellieħa	1715	(Sovereign Military Order of Malta) Order of Saint John	Demolished
Ferretti Battery		Birżebbuġa	1715	(Sovereign Military Order of Malta) Order of Saint John	Intact, used as a restaurant
Garden Battery		Sliema	1889–1894	United Kingdom	Intact, restoration planned
Għallis Battery		Naxxar	1715	(Sovereign Military Order of Malta) Order of Saint John	Ruins
Għargħar Battery		San Ġwann	1798	Maltese insurgents	Demolished
Jesuit Hill Battery		Marsa	1799	Maltese insurgents	Demolished
Lascaris Battery		Valletta	1854–1856	United Kingdom	Intact
Lembi Battery		Sliema	1757	(Sovereign Military Order of Malta) Order of Saint John	Demolished
Maħsel Battery		Marsaskala	1714	(Sovereign Military Order of Malta) Order of Saint John	Demolished
Marsa Battery		Marsa	1798	Maltese insurgents	Demolished
Mistra Battery		Mellieħa	1761	(Sovereign Military Order of Malta) Order of Saint John	Intact, restored
Pembroke Battery		Pembroke	1897–1899	United Kingdom	Partially demolished, one gun emplacement survives.
Pinto Battery		Birżebbuġa	1715	(Sovereign Military Order of Malta) Order of Saint John	Heavily altered
Qalet Marku Battery		Naxxar	1715	(Sovereign Military Order of Malta) Order of Saint John	Ruins
Qawra Tower & Battery		St. Paul's Bay	1715	(Sovereign Military Order of Malta) Order of Saint John	Intact, used as a restaurant and swimming pool
Qolla l-Bajda Battery		Żebbuġ, Gozo	1716	(Sovereign Military Order of Malta) Order of Saint John	Intact, abandoned
Ramla Left Battery		Xagħra	1715	(Sovereign Military Order of Malta) Order of Saint John	Ruins
Ramla Right Battery		Nadur	1715	(Sovereign Military Order of Malta) Order of Saint John	Ruins
Riħama Battery		Marsaskala	1714	(Sovereign Military Order of Malta) Order of Saint John	Mostly intact, restoration planned
Rinella Battery		Kalkara	1878–1886	United Kingdom	Intact, restored
Saint Anthony's Battery		Qala	1731–1732	(Sovereign Military Order of Malta) Order of Saint John	Intact, restored
Saint Julian's Tower & Battery		Sliema	1715	(Sovereign Military Order of Malta) Order of Saint John	Battery partially intact, tower intact
Saint Lucian Tower & Battery		Marsaxlokk	1715	(Sovereign Military Order of Malta) Order of Saint John	Battery demolished, tower intact
Saint Mary's Battery		Għajnsielem	1715	(Sovereign Military Order of Malta) Order of Saint John	Intact, restored
Saint Mary's Battery		Żebbuġ, Gozo	1715	(Sovereign Military Order of Malta) Order of Saint John	Demolished
Saint Paul's Battery		Marsaxlokk	1881–1886	United Kingdom	Intact, abandoned
Saint Peter's Battery		Kalkara	1798	Maltese insurgents	Demolished
San Petronio Battery		Kalkara	1602	(Sovereign Military Order of Malta) Order of Saint John	Destroyed, ditch survives
San Rocco Battery		Kalkara	1798–1799	Maltese insurgents	Demolished
Saint Thomas Tower & Battery		Marsaskala	1715	(Sovereign Military Order of Malta) Order of Saint John	Tower intact, battery rebuilt on modern interpretative lines.
Saluting Battery		Valletta	1560s	(Sovereign Military Order of Malta) Order of Saint John	Intact, restored
Sliema Batteries		Sliema	1798	Maltese insurgents	Demolished
Sliema Point Battery		Sliema	1872–1876	United Kingdom	Intact, used as a restaurant
Spinola Battery		St. Julian's	1889–1894	United Kingdom	Demolished
Ta' Għemmuna Battery		St. Julian's	1799	Maltese insurgents	Demolished
Tal-Borg Battery		Tarxien	1798	Maltese insurgents	Demolished
Tarġa Battery		Mosta; St. Paul's Bay	1887–1890s	United Kingdom	Intact, restoration planned
Tas-Samra Battery		Ħamrun	1798	Maltese insurgents	Demolished. The church around which the battery was built still exists.
Tombrell Battery		Marsaxlokk	1722	(Sovereign Military Order of Malta) Order of Saint John	Demolished, ditch survives
Vendôme Battery		Mellieħa	1715	(Sovereign Military Order of Malta) Order of Saint John	Intact, dilapidated
Westreme Battery		Mellieħa	1715	(Sovereign Military Order of Malta) Order of Saint John	Blockhouse intact, gun platform destroyed
Wied Musa Battery		Mellieħa	1715	(Sovereign Military Order of Malta) Order of Saint John	Gun platform intact, blockhouse heavily altered
Wignacourt Tower & Battery		St. Paul's Bay	1715	(Sovereign Military Order of Malta) Order of Saint John	Battery mostly intact, tower intact
Wilġa Battery		Marsaxlokk	1714	(Sovereign Military Order of Malta) Order of Saint John	Blockhouse intact, gun platform destroyed
Wolseley Battery		Marsaxlokk	1897–1899	United Kingdom	Intact
Żabbar Batteries		Żabbar	1798	Maltese insurgents	Demolished
Żejtun Batteries		Żejtun	1798	Maltese insurgents	Demolished (one cannon remains)
Żonqor Battery		Marsaskala	1882–1886	United Kingdom	Intact, used as a farm

Notes:

- Batteries located within larger fortifications are not included in the above list unless they are notable in their own right. Such batteries include:
  - De Guiral Battery in Fort Saint Angelo
  - Grunenburgh's Batteries in Fort Saint Angelo, Valletta and Senglea
  - Low Battery in the Cittadella
  - Several other batteries within the fortifications of Birgu
- Anti-aircraft batteries built in World War II are also not included.

== Redoubts ==
Name	Image	Location	Built	Builder	Status
Baħar iċ-Ċagħaq Redoubt		Naxxar	1715	(Sovereign Military Order of Malta) Order of Saint John	Intact, used as a bar
Briconet Redoubt		Marsaskala	1715	(Sovereign Military Order of Malta) Order of Saint John	Intact, used as a police station
Crivelli Redoubt		Mellieħa	1715	(Sovereign Military Order of Malta) Order of Saint John	Ruins
Del Fango Redoubt		Marsaxlokk	1715	(Sovereign Military Order of Malta) Order of Saint John	Demolished
Fresnoy Redoubt		Birżebbuġa	1715	(Sovereign Military Order of Malta) Order of Saint John	Demolished
Marsalforn Tower		Xagħra	1720	(Sovereign Military Order of Malta) Order of Saint John	Demolished
Mellieħa Redoubt		Mellieħa	1715	(Sovereign Military Order of Malta) Order of Saint John	Demolished
Perellos Redoubt		St. Paul's Bay	1715	(Sovereign Military Order of Malta) Order of Saint John	Demolished
Qalet Marku Redoubt		Naxxar	1715	(Sovereign Military Order of Malta) Order of Saint John	Demolished
Qortin Redoubt		Mellieħa	1715	(Sovereign Military Order of Malta) Order of Saint John	Partially intact
Ramla Redoubt		Xagħra	1715	(Sovereign Military Order of Malta) Order of Saint John	Demolished
Saint George Redoubt		Birżebbuġa	1715	(Sovereign Military Order of Malta) Order of Saint John	Intact
Saint Lucian Redoubt		Marsaxlokk	1799	Kingdom of Great Britain	Demolished
Saint Mary's Redoubt		Għajnsielem	1716	(Sovereign Military Order of Malta) Order of Saint John	Demolished
San Rocco Redoubt		Kalkara	1799	Kingdom of Great Britain	Demolished
Spinola Redoubt		Birżebbuġa	1715	(Sovereign Military Order of Malta) Order of Saint John	Demolished
Tal-Bir Redoubt		Mellieħa	1715	(Sovereign Military Order of Malta) Order of Saint John	Ruins
Vendôme Tower		Marsaxlokk	1715	(Sovereign Military Order of Malta) Order of Saint John	Intact, used as a football club headquarters
Windmill Redoubt		Żabbar	1798	Maltese insurgents	Demolished. The windmill around which the redoubt was built still exists.
Ximenes Redoubt		Naxxar	1715	(Sovereign Military Order of Malta) Order of Saint John	Intact, restored
Xwejni Redoubt		Żebbuġ, Gozo	1715	(Sovereign Military Order of Malta) Order of Saint John	Demolished
Żabbar Redoubt		Żabbar	1798	Maltese insurgents	Demolished

== Entrenchments ==
Name	Image	Location	Built	Builder	Status
Bengħisa Entrenchment		Birżebbuġa	1761	(Sovereign Military Order of Malta) Order of Saint John	Demolished
Birżebbuġa Entrenchment		Birżebbuġa	1761	(Sovereign Military Order of Malta) Order of Saint John	Partially intact
Falca Lines		Mġarr; St. Paul's Bay	1723–1732	(Sovereign Military Order of Malta) Order of Saint John	Ruins
Għajn Tuffieħa Entrenchment		Mġarr		(Sovereign Military Order of Malta) Order of Saint John	Partially intact
Louvier Entrenchment		Mellieħa	1761	(Sovereign Military Order of Malta) Order of Saint John	Never completed Largely intact
Madliena Entrenchment		Naxxar		(Sovereign Military Order of Malta) Order of Saint John	Short stretch intact
Naxxar Entrenchment		Naxxar	1722	(Sovereign Military Order of Malta) Order of Saint John	Partially intact
Qawra Point Entrenchment		St. Paul's Bay	1761	(Sovereign Military Order of Malta) Order of Saint John	Short stretch survives in ruins
Qbajjar Entrenchment		Żebbuġ, Gozo		(Sovereign Military Order of Malta) Order of Saint John	Few remains survive
Ramla Entrenchment		Xagħra	1720	(Sovereign Military Order of Malta) Order of Saint John	Few remains survive
Saint Julian's Entrenchment		St. Julian's		(Sovereign Military Order of Malta) Order of Saint John	Short stretch intact
Saint Lucian Entrenchment		Marsaxlokk	1799	Kingdom of Great Britain	Demolished
Spinola Entrenchment		St. Julian's	1761	(Sovereign Military Order of Malta) Order of Saint John	Partially intact
Ta' Kassisu Entrenchment		Mellieħa	1761	(Sovereign Military Order of Malta) Order of Saint John	Never completed Largely intact
Xgħajra Entrenchment		Żabbar	1761	(Sovereign Military Order of Malta) Order of Saint John	Short stretches intact
Xrobb l-Għaġin Entrenchment		Marsaxlokk	1761	(Sovereign Military Order of Malta) Order of Saint John	Ruins
Żewwieqa Entrenchment		Għajnsielem	1761	(Sovereign Military Order of Malta) Order of Saint John	Ruins

Notes:

- Entrenchments were originally planned to be built around the entire coastline of the Maltese Islands. The ones listed here are those of which some remains survive, or which are definitely known to have existed.

== Lines of fortification ==
Name	Image	Location	Built	Builder	Status
Corradino Lines		Paola	1871–1880	United Kingdom	Mostly intact
Victoria Lines		Rabat; Mġarr; Mosta; Naxxar; Għargħur	1875–1899	United Kingdom	Partially intact

Notes:

- The Floriana Lines, Santa Margherita Lines and the Cottonera Lines are also lines of fortification, but they are listed with the walled cities since they are close to settlements.

== Stop walls ==
- The 'stop wall' that plugged a fortification gap in Wied Żnuber

== Fortified houses and privately built towers ==
- Ta' Cirpisin Tower
- Castellan Country House

Name	Image	Location	Built	Builder	Status
Sant'Angelo Tower		Birżebbuġa	1702 or 1775	Viani	Destroyed during WWII
Armoury		Siġġiewi			Intact
Bubaqra Tower		Żurrieq	c. 1579	Don Matteolo Pisani	Intact
Cardona Tower		Għarb		Cardona family	Intact. Built before 1649. Also known as tas-Sarretta Tower. Intact but machicolations removed. They appear to were still partially intact on 21 August 1933.
Castello Lanzun		San Ġwann	15th century–1713	Wenzu Lanzun	Intact
Gauci Tower		Naxxar	16th century	Francesco Gauci	Intact
Gourgion Tower		Xewkija	1690	Giovanni Gourgion	Demolished, some stonework survives
Ingraw Tower		Żejtun	1603	Clemente Tabone	Dismantled; stonework used to build farmhouses
Mamo Tower		Marsaskala	1657	Gregorio and Giorgio Mamo	Intact, restored
Mari ta’ Qerqni Tower		Birżebbuġa	Unclear		Intact, converted into a farmhouse
Sant'Antnin Tower		Żejtun			Destroyed during WWII
Santa Cecilia Tower		Għajnsielem	1613	Fra Bernardo Macedonia	Intact
Ta' Bettina Tower		Marsaxlokk	c. 1740	D'Aurel Family	Intact
Tal-Buttar Tower		Marsaskala			Intact and used as a rural building with a close by watermill.
Tal-Gardiel Tower		Marsaskala			Intact
Tal-Mozz Tower		Żejtun	1628		Intact. Also known as Tal-Kwies Tower.
Wied il-Qoton Tower		Birżebbuġa	18th century		Unprofessionally modified in 1758
Verdala Palace		Siġġiewi	1586	Hugues Loubenx de Verdalle	Intact
