= Gironda =

Gironda is an Italian surname. Notable people with the surname include:

- Ettore Gironda (died 1626), Roman Catholic prelate who served as Bishop of Massa Lubrense
- Vince Gironda (1917 – 1997), American professional bodybuilder, personal trainer, author

== See also ==
- Gironde (disambiguation)
- Gironda Battery
