= Spinola =

Spinola is a surname. Notable people with the surname include:

- Agostino Spinola (d. 1537), Italian cardinal
- Alberto Spinola (born 1943), Italian water polo player
- Ambrogio Spinola, 1st Marquis of the Balbases (1569–1630), Genoese banker and nobleman who served as a Spanish general
- António Sebastião Spínola (1875–1956), Portuguese politician
- António de Spínola (1910–1996), Portuguese soldier and politician
- Agustín de Spínola Basadone (1597–1649), Spanish cardinal and Archbishop of Seville
- Battista Spinola, 16th-century Doge of Genoa
- Benedict Spinola (1519/20–1580), a 16th-century Genoese merchant in London
- Charles Spinola (died 1622), Beatified Spanish Jesuit missionary martyr in Japan
- Cristina Spínola (born 1976), Spanish journalist
- Cristoval Rojas de Spinola (died 1695), Spanish ecclesiastic
- Felipe Antonio Spinola, 4th Marquis of the Balbases (1665 – after 1721), Spanish courtier and Viceroy of Sicily
- Filippo Spinola (1535–1593), Italian cardinal
- Filippo Spinola, 2nd Marquis of Los Balbases (1594–1659)
- Francis Barretto Spinola (1821–1891), American soldier and congressman
- Giambattista Spinola (1615–1704), Cardinal and Archbishop of Genoa
- Giambattista Spinola, Jr (1646–1719), Italian cardinal
- Giandomenico Spinola (1580–1646), Italian cardinal
- Giovanni Battista Spinola (1681–1752), Italian cardinal
- Magdalena Spínola (1896-1991), Guatemalan poet
- Marcelo Spinola y Maestre (1835–1906), Archbishop of Seville
- Maximilian Spinola (1780–1857), Italian entomologist
- Oberto Spinola, 13th-century politician in Genoa
- Opicino Spinola, early fourteenth century, political leader in Genoa
- Paolo Spinola (1929–2005), Italian filmmaker
- Paolo Spinola, 3rd Marquis of the Balbases (1628–1699), Spanish diplomat
- Ugo Pietro Spinola (1791–1858), Italian papal diplomat and cardinal

== See also ==
- Spinola family is a leading political family in Genoa from the 13th century onwards
- Palazzo Spinola (disambiguation), a number of palaces in Italy and Malta
- Spinola Bay, a bay in St. Julian's, Malta
- Spinola Battery, a former battery in St. Julian's, Malta
- Spinola Redoubt, a former redoubt in Birżebbuġa, Malta
