= Fango =

Fango may refer to:

- Fango (river), small coastal river in Haute-Corse, France
- Fango (song), song written by Jovanotti, Riccardo Onori and Michael Franti, released in December 2007
- Del Fango Redoubt, fort in Marsaxlokk, Malta
- Flor de Fango, 1908 outdoor sculpture by Enrique Guerra
- Gaius Fuficius Fango (died 40 BCE), Ancient Roman military leader and politician
