= General Spinola =

General Spinola may mean:

- Ambrogio Spinola, 1st Marquess of Los Balbases (1569–1630), Genoese aristocrat who served as a Spanish general
- António de Spínola (1910–1996), Portuguese military officer
- Francis B. Spinola (1821–1891), Italian-American general in the Union Army

== See also ==
- Spinola
