= Gironda Battery =

Gironda Battery may refer to the following batteries in Gozo, Malta:

- Mġarr Battery
- Ramla Right Battery
- Saint Mary's Battery (Marsalforn)
