= Capuchin Convent Battery =

Artillery battery in Kalkara, Malta

- Batterija tal-Kunvent tal-Kapuċċini
- Part of the French blockade batteries
- Kalkara, Malta
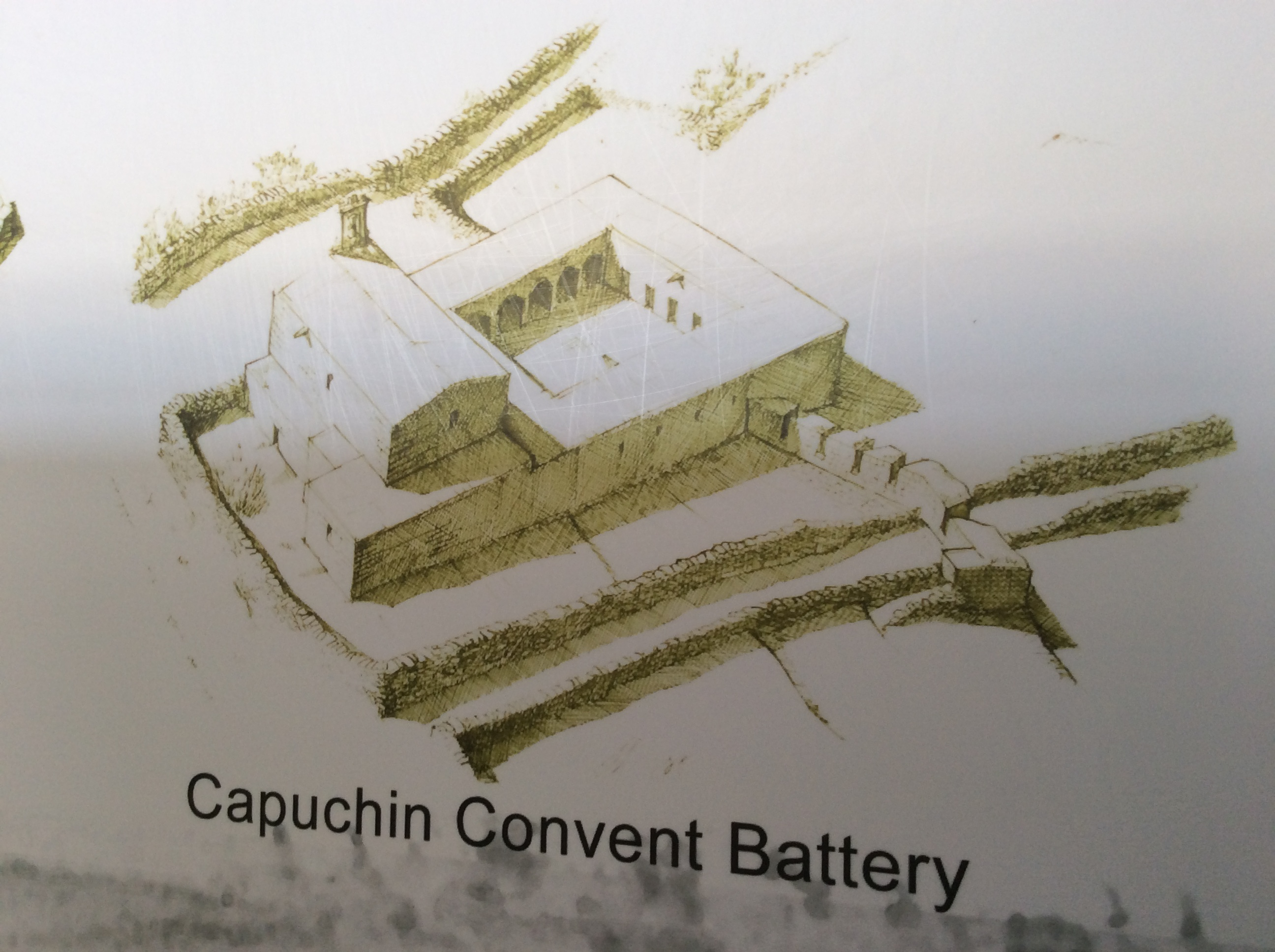
- Reconstruction of Capuchin Convent Battery by Stephen C. Spiteri at the Fortifications Interpretation Centre

Site information
- Type: Artillery battery

Location
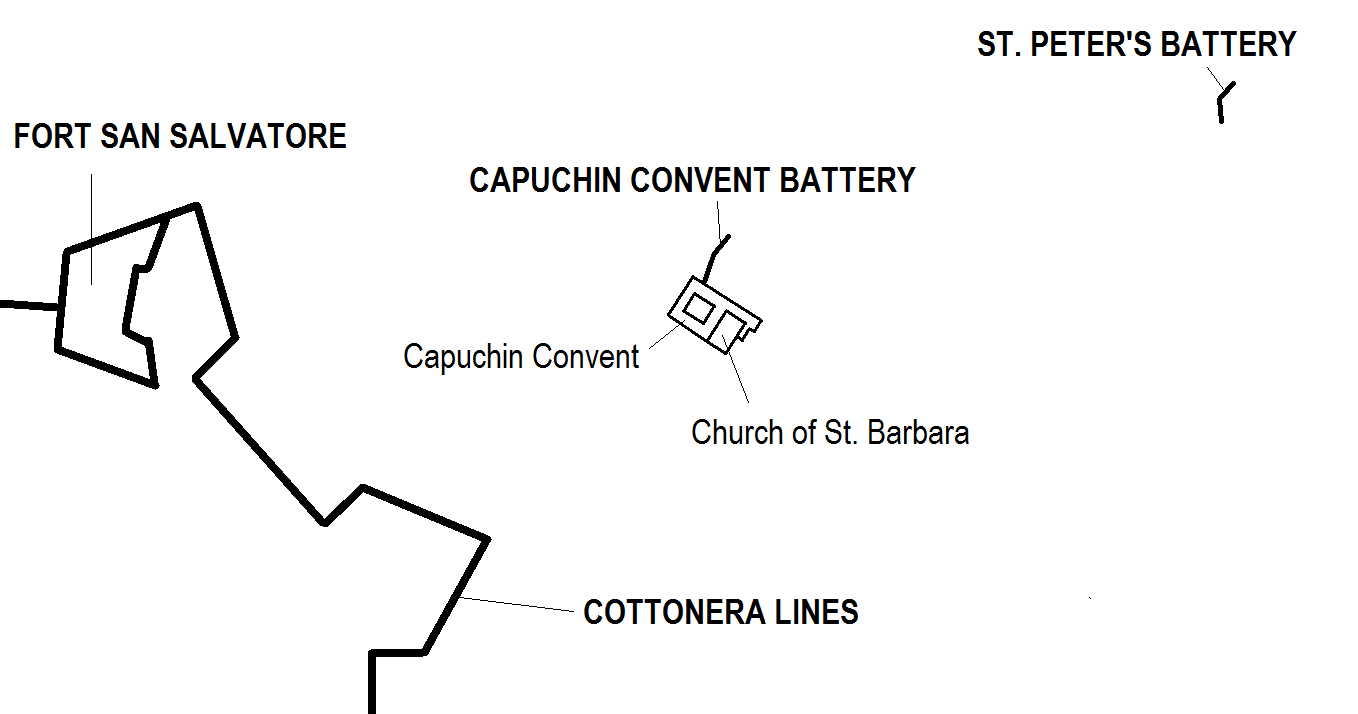
- Map of Capuchin Convent Battery in relation to Saint Peter's Battery, and the then French-occupied Fort San Salvatore and Cottonera Lines
- Coordinates: 35°53′10.2″N 14°31′59.5″E

Site history
- Built: 1799
- Built by: Maltese insurgents or Great Britain
- In use: 1799–1800
- Materials: Limestone
- Fate: Demolished
- Battles/wars: Siege of Malta (1798–1800)

Capuchin Convent Battery (Maltese: Batterija tal-Kunvent tal-Kapuċċini), also known as Kalkara Battery (Maltese: Batterija tal-Kalkara), was an artillery battery in Kalkara, Malta, built by Maltese insurgents during the French blockade of 1798–1800. It was part of a chain of batteries, redoubts and entrenchments encircling the French positions in Marsamxett and the Grand Harbour.

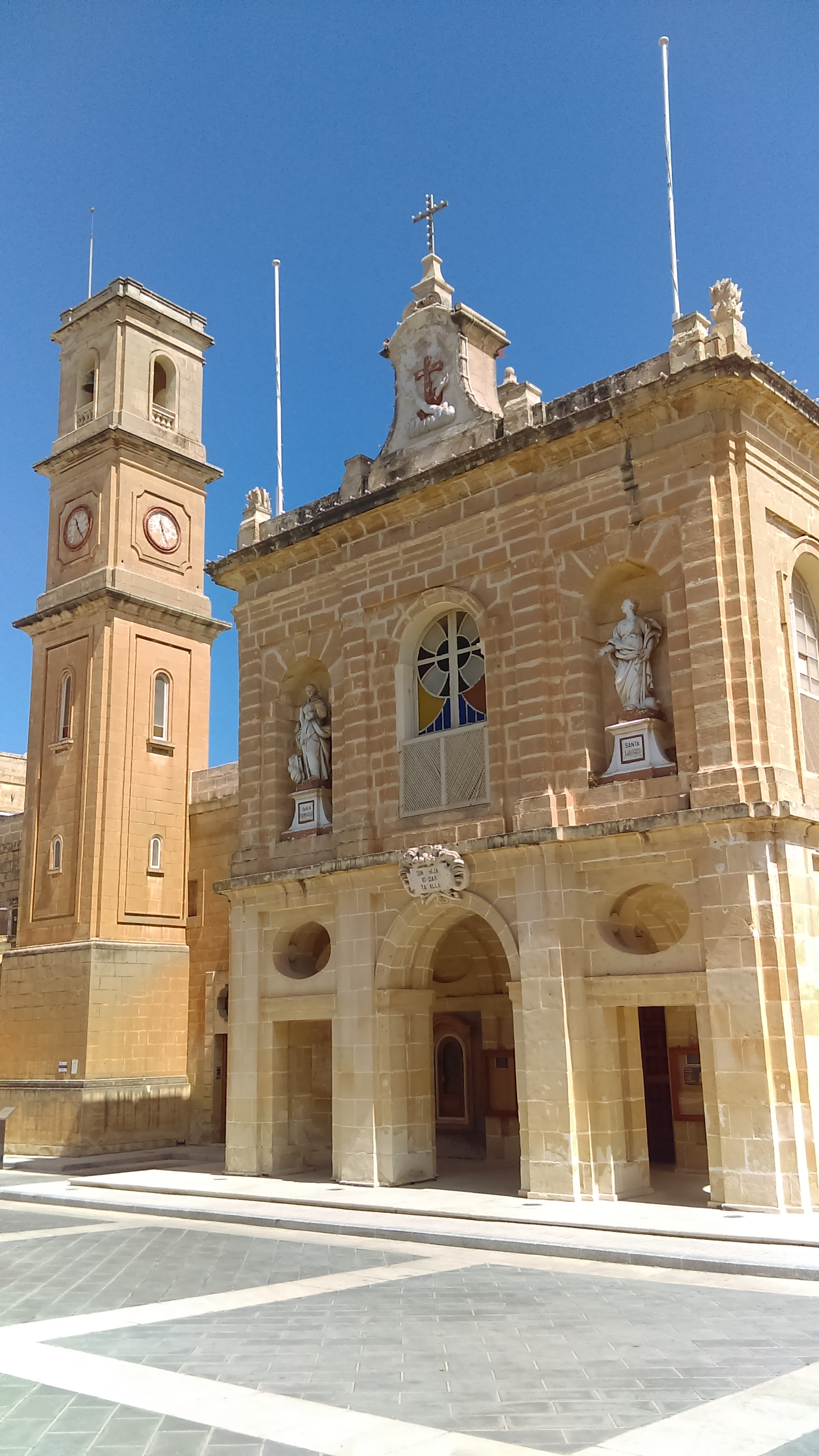
The church within the Capuchin convent near which the battery was built

Capuchin Convent Battery was built overlooking Kalkara Creek. The battery was located adjacent to a Capuchin convent which had been built between 1736 and 1743. The convent sheltered it from bombardment from the nearby Cottonera Lines and the Post of Castile. It was medium-sized, and it blocked a country lane which led towards the creek. Its armament is not known.

The battery was possibly built by Alexander Ball. Construction started in January 1799, and was completed within a month.

Like the other French blockade fortifications, the battery was dismantled, possibly sometime after 1814. No traces of the battery can be seen today, but the convent still exists, although it has been modified.
