= Del Fango Redoubt =

- Ridott ta' Del Fango
- Marsaxlokk, Malta

Site information
- Type: Redoubt

Location
- Coordinates: 35°50′29.4″N 14°32′44.1″E

Site history
- Built: 1715–1716
- Built by: Order of Saint John
- Materials: Limestone
- Fate: Demolished

Del Fango Redoubt (Maltese: Ridott ta' Del Fango), also known as De Vami Redoubt (Maltese: Ridott ta' De Vami), was a redoubt in Marsaxlokk, Malta. Made of limestone, it was built in 1715–1716 by the Order of Saint John as part of a series of coastal fortifications around the Maltese Islands. An entrenchment was originally located close to the redoubt.

Del Fango Redoubt was part of a chain of fortifications that defended Marsaxlokk Bay, which also included three other redoubts, the large Saint Lucian Tower, two smaller De Redin towers, seven batteries and three entrenchments. The nearest fortifications to Del Fango Redoubt were Vendôme Tower to the southwest and Wilġa Battery to the southeast.

Del Fango Redoubt's layout was typical of most other coastal redoubts built in Malta. It consisted of a pentagonal platform with a rectangular blockhouse sealing off the gorge.

Both the redoubt and the nearby entrenchment have been demolished, and no remnants can be found.
