= Fresnoy Redoubt =

Historical defensive fort in Malta (1715-1897)

- Ridott ta' Fresnoy
- Birżebbuġa, Malta

Site information
- Type: Tour-Reduit

Location
- Coordinates: 35°49′0.6″N 14°32′9.8″E

Site history
- Built: 1715–1716
- Built by: Order of Saint John
- Materials: Limestone
- Fate: Demolished

Fresnoy Redoubt (Maltese: Ridott ta' Fresnoy), also known as Kalafrana Redoubt (Maltese: Ridott ta' Kalafrana), was a tour-reduit in Birżebbuġa, Malta. It was built by the Order of Saint John in 1715–1716 as one of a series of coastal fortifications around the Maltese Islands. It was demolished in 1897.

== History ==
Fresnoy Redoubt was built in 1715–1716 as part of a chain of fortifications that defended Marsaxlokk Bay, which also included three other redoubts, the large Saint Lucian Tower, two smaller De Redin towers, seven batteries and three entrenchments. The nearest fortifications to Fresnoy Redoubt were Elminiech Battery to the west and Balbani Battery to the east.

Fresnoy Redoubt was one of four tour-reduits built in Malta, the other three being Spinola Redoubt, Vendôme Tower and Marsalforn Tower. It had a semi-circular front, and a redan on the landward side, all of which were pierced by musket loopholes.

The limestone-redoubt was demolished by an order given by the Public Works Department on 22 February 1897. Its site is now occupied by part of the Malta Freeport. Other sources say it is occupied by Villa Pisana.
