= Elminiech Battery =

Artillery battery in Malta

- Batterija t'Elminiech
- Birżebbuġa, Malta

Site information
- Type: Artillery battery

Location
- Coordinates: 35°49′4.4″N 14°31′57.8″E

Site history
- Built: 1715–1716
- Built by: Order of Saint John
- Materials: Limestone
- Fate: Demolished

Elminiech Battery (Maltese: Batterija t'Elminiech, corrupted into Batterija ta' Mnieħ), also known as Figuella Battery (Maltese: Batterija ta' Figuella), San Raimondo Battery (Maltese: Batterija ta' San Raimond) or Oitelboura Battery, was an artillery battery in Birżebbuġa, Malta. It was built by the Order of Saint John in 1715–16 as part of a series of coastal fortifications around the Maltese Islands.

Built mainly of limestone, Elminiech Battery was part of a chain of fortifications that defended Marsaxlokk Bay, which also included six other batteries, the large Saint Lucian Tower, two smaller De Redin towers, four redoubts and three entrenchments. The nearest fortifications to Elminiech Battery were the Birżebbuġa Entrenchments to the northwest and Fresnoy Redoubt to the east. Construction of the battery cost 1,451 scudi.

The battery was demolished, and its site is now occupied by part of the Malta Freeport.
