= Gironde (disambiguation) =

Gironde is a department in southwestern France.

Gironde may also refer to:

- Gironde estuary
- The Gironde, or Girondins, a political group active in the French Revolution

== See also ==
- Gironde estuary and Pertuis sea Marine Nature Park
