= Balbani Battery =

- Batterija ta' Balbani
- Birżebbuġa, Malta

Site information
- Type: Artillery battery

Location
- Coordinates: 35°48′58.2″N 14°32′21.4″E

Site history
- Built: 1721
- Built by: Order of Saint John
- Materials: Limestone
- Fate: Demolished

Balbani Battery (Maltese: Batterija ta' Balbani), also known as Bengħisa Battery (Maltese: Batterija ta' Bengħisa) or Saint Catherine's Battery (Maltese: Batterija ta' Santa Katarina), was an artillery battery in Birżebbuġa, Malta. It was built by the Order of Saint John on commands by Grand Master Manuel Pinto da Fonseca and was completed in 1721. The battery was named for Cristoforo Balbani, who partially financed its construction. It was one of a series of coastal fortifications around the Maltese Islands.

Balbani Battery was part of a chain of fortifications that defended Marsaxlokk Bay, which also included six other batteries, the large Saint Lucian Tower, two smaller De Redin towers, four redoubts and three entrenchments. The nearest fortifications to Balbani Battery were Bengħisa Tower to the south and Fresnoy Redoubt to the west. Construction of the battery cost 1,855 scudi. The mastermind of the battery was architect Burlemarch and at its completion it was armed with eight cannons. It had a pentagonal platform with a blockhouse at the rear, which was also defended by a redan.

The battery was demolished, and its site is now occupied by part of the Malta Freeport. The land where it was is still called Ta' Balbani for the battery.
