= Saint Peter's Battery =

Former artillery battery in Malta

- Batterija ta' San Pietru
- Part of the French blockade batteries
- Kalkara, Malta

Site information
- Type: Artillery battery

Location
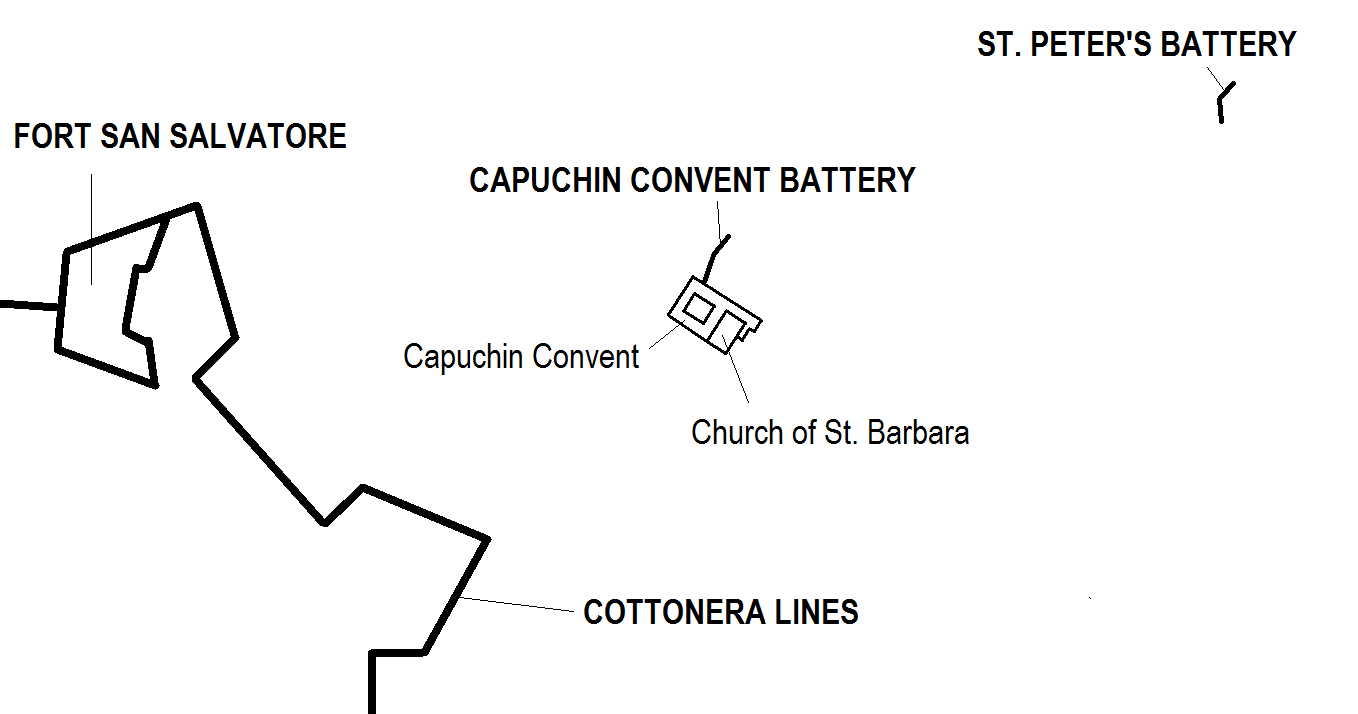
- Map of St. Peter's Battery in relation to Capuchin Convent Battery, and the then French-occupied Fort San Salvatore and Cottonera Lines
- Coordinates: 35°53′14.3″N 14°32′14.8″E

Site history
- Built: c. 1798
- Built by: Maltese insurgents
- In use: c. 1798–1800
- Materials: Limestone
- Fate: Demolished
- Battles/wars: Siege of Malta (1798–1800)

Saint Peter's Battery (Maltese: Batterija ta' San Pietru) was an artillery battery in Kalkara, Malta, built by Maltese insurgents during the French blockade of 1798–1800. It was part of a chain of batteries, redoubts and entrenchments encircling the French positions in Marsamxett and the Grand Harbour.

The battery was located about 300m to the rear of Capuchin Convent Battery, and was probably manned by militia from Żejtun. It possibly had a vaulted underground chamber which served as a barracks. Other details about the battery or its armament are unknown.

Like the other French blockade fortifications, St. Peter's Battery was dismantled, possibly sometime after 1814. No traces of it can be seen today.
