= Della Grazie Battery =

Maltese artillery battery built by the British

- Il-Batterija tal-Grazzja
- Xgħajra, Malta
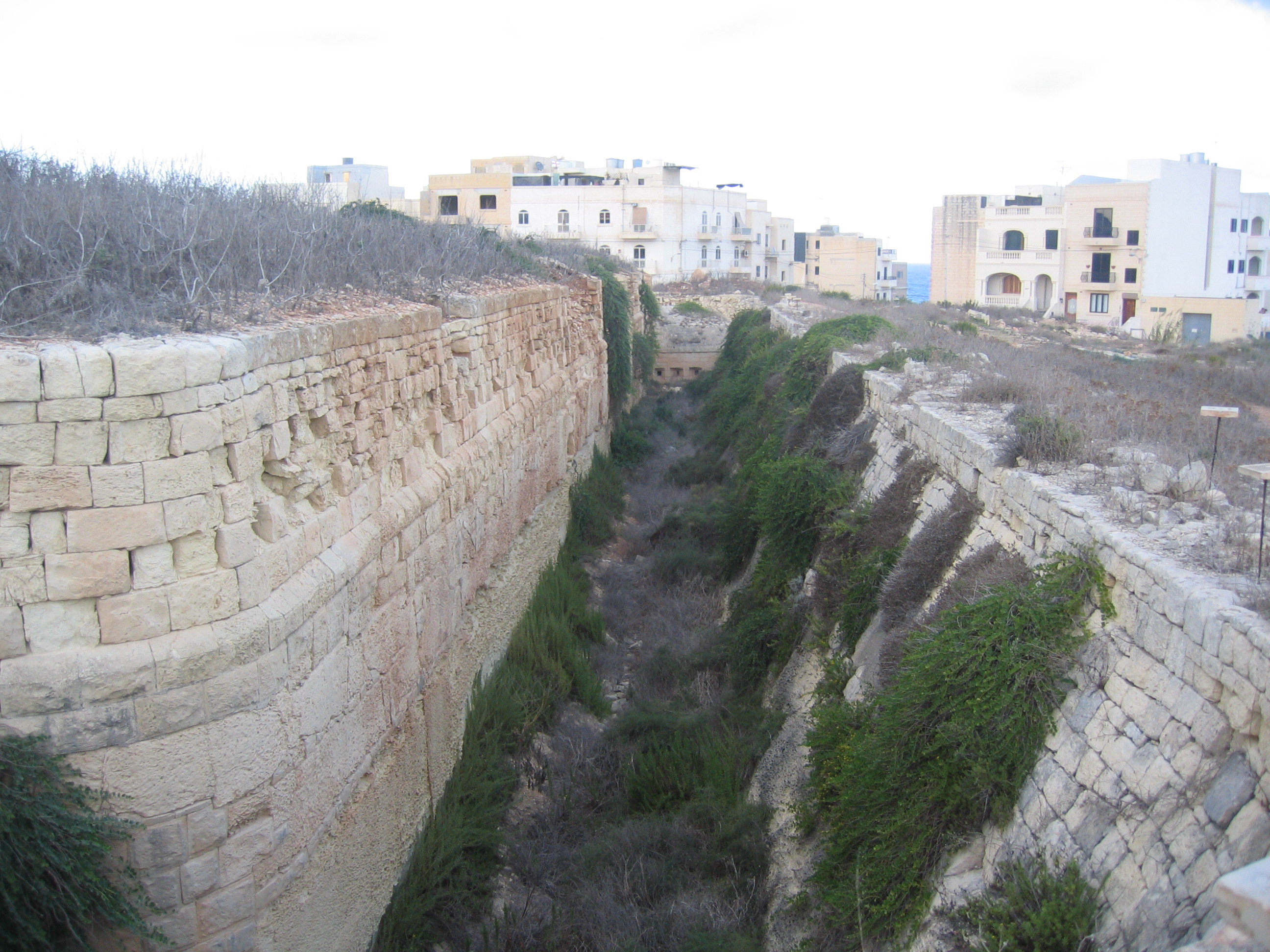
- Right hand ditch of the battery

Site information
- Type: Polygonal artillery battery
- Owner: Lands Authority
- Controlled by: Under management agreement for The Scouts Association of Malta - Xgħajra Scout Group
- Open to the public: No
- Condition: Intact - Under restoration

Location
- Coordinates: 35°53′9″N 14°32′58″E
- Area: 28,400 m^{2} (306,000 sq ft)

Site history
- Built: 1888–1893
- Built by: British Empire
- In use: 1893–1910; 1940s
- Materials: Limestone
- Battles/wars: World War II

Della Grazie Battery (Maltese: Il-Batterija tal-Grazzja), also known as Xgħajra Battery (Maltese: Il-Batterija tax-Xgħajra), is an artillery battery in Xgħajra, Malta. It was built by the British between 1888 and 1893. The battery stands above the shore to the east of Grand Harbour, between Fort Saint Rocco and Fort Saint Leonardo. It is currently being used by the Xgħajra Scout Group as their main headquarters and campsite, and part of it is used as the town hall for Xgħajra.

== History ==
Construction of the battery started in October 1888 and was completed in March 1893, at a cost of £16,344. It was constructed to take advantage of the improved breech loading guns then coming into service. It was equipped with two 6 inch and two 10 inch breech loading guns in disappearing mounts.

The installation takes the form of a polygonal fort, irregular hexagonal in plan, with two caponiers defending the forward ditches. Access to the fort is via a gatehouse and causeway across the rear ditch.

The battery takes its name from the much earlier Wignacourt tower, the Santa Maria delle Grazie Tower that stood close to the present battery. The tower was demolished to clear the field of fire of the present battery.

The battery was abandoned in 1910 and its guns were removed. However, in World War II the battery was used as a coastal defence search light battery. At this time some structures were added to accommodate the searchlights.

== Present day ==
The battery's management and upkeep are currently overseen through an agreement with the Xgħajra Scout Group. The group is financing the battery's restoration through its own funds and various fundraising activities. The Scouts aim to completely refurbish the battery and eventually open it to the public.

The Xgħajra Scout Group has formed a subcommittee named "At the Fort" to progressively rejuvenate the Delle Grazie battery. The 'At the Fort' committee meticulously organizes events that invite the public to visit and learn about the fort, with all proceeds contributing to the battery's continuous restoration and maintenance.

== Gallery ==
The gallery below shows views on an anti-clockwise tour of the exterior of the fort. The rear section of the left hand ditch and the right half or the rear ditch are private property and inaccessible to photograph.

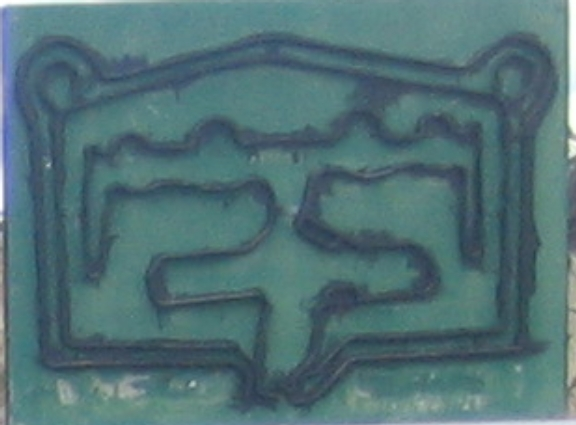
Layout of the Battery, detail from a sign beside the gate.

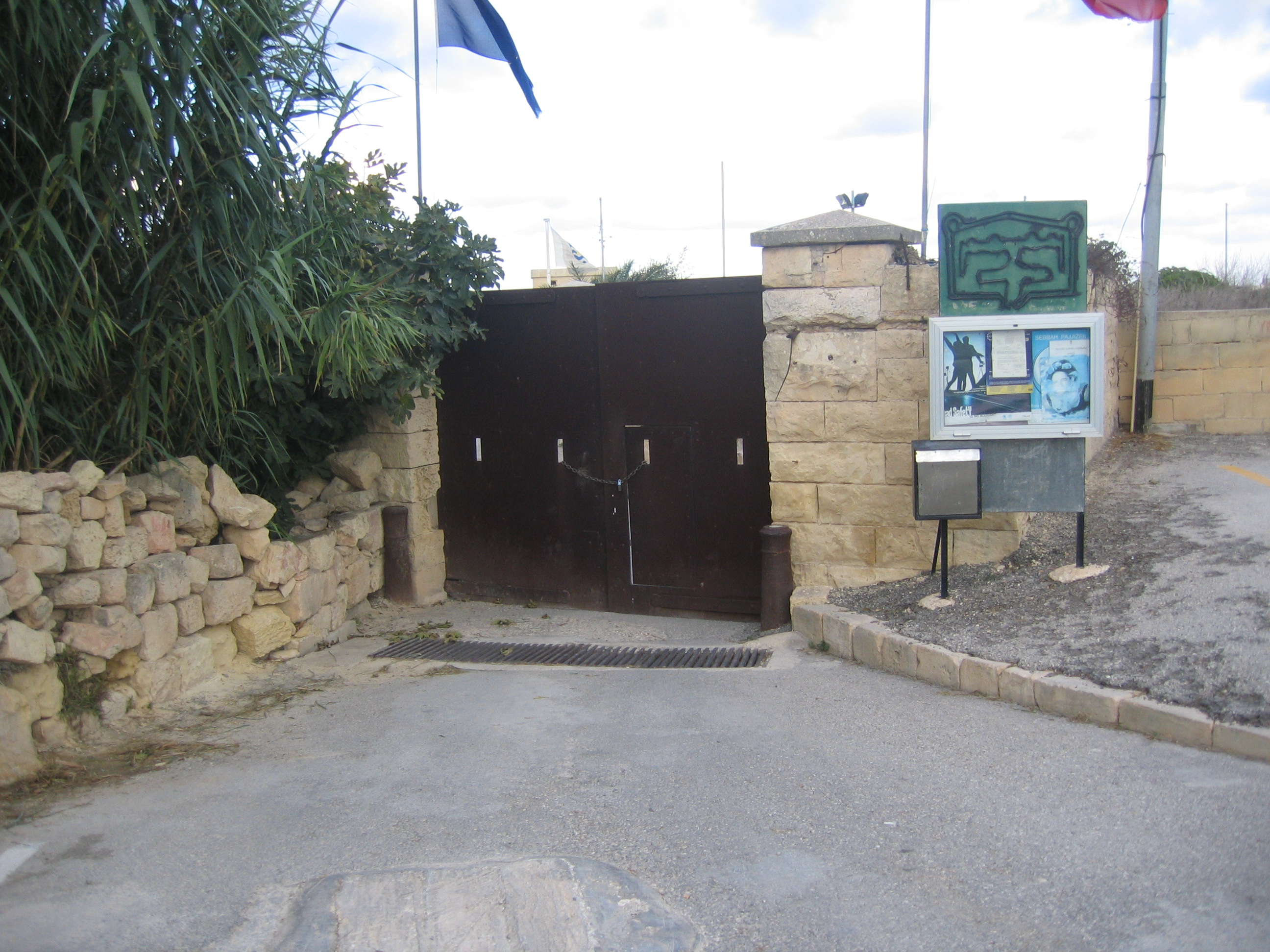
The modern gate that closes off the causeway.

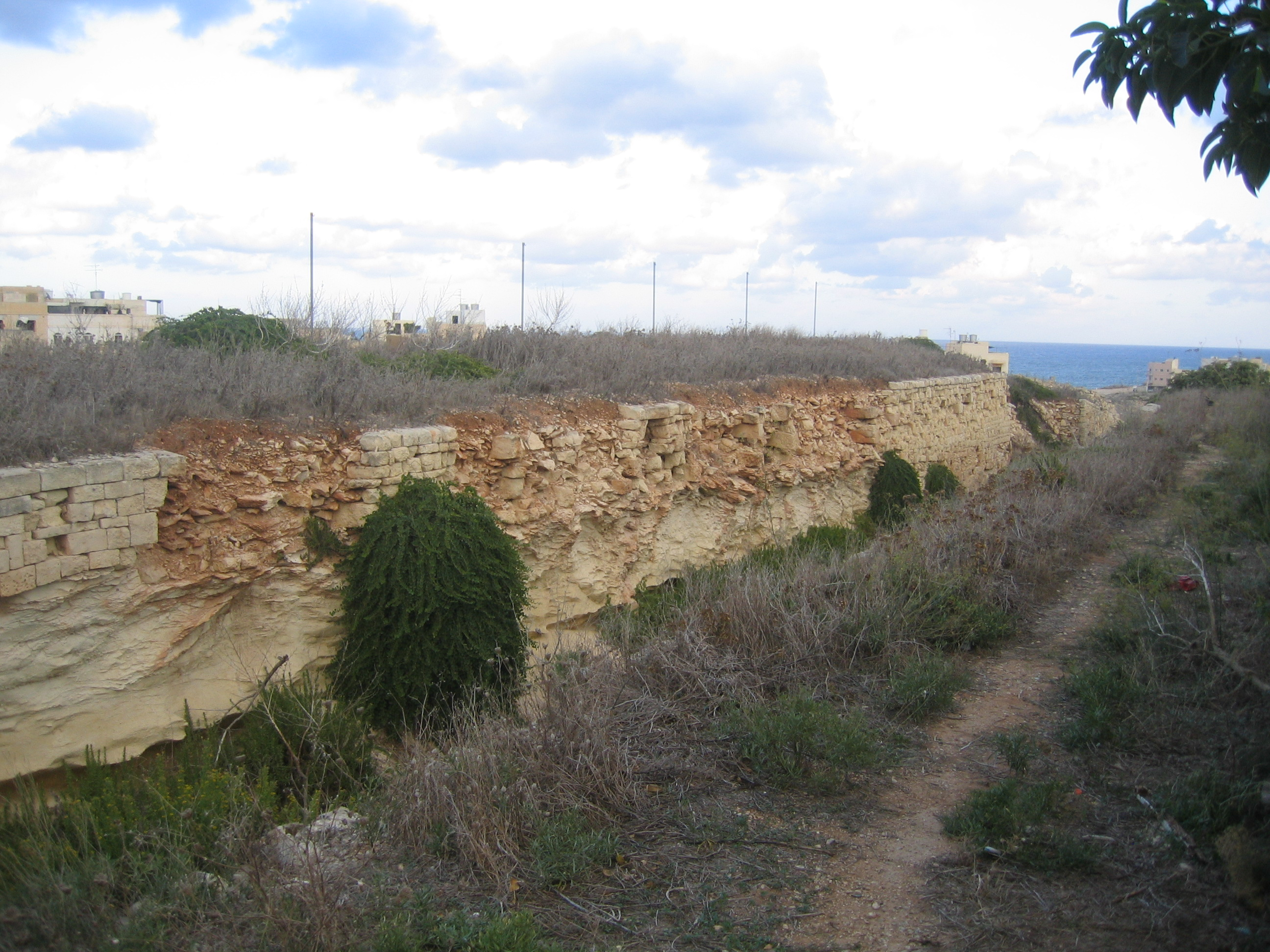
looking down the rear ditch away from the causeway.

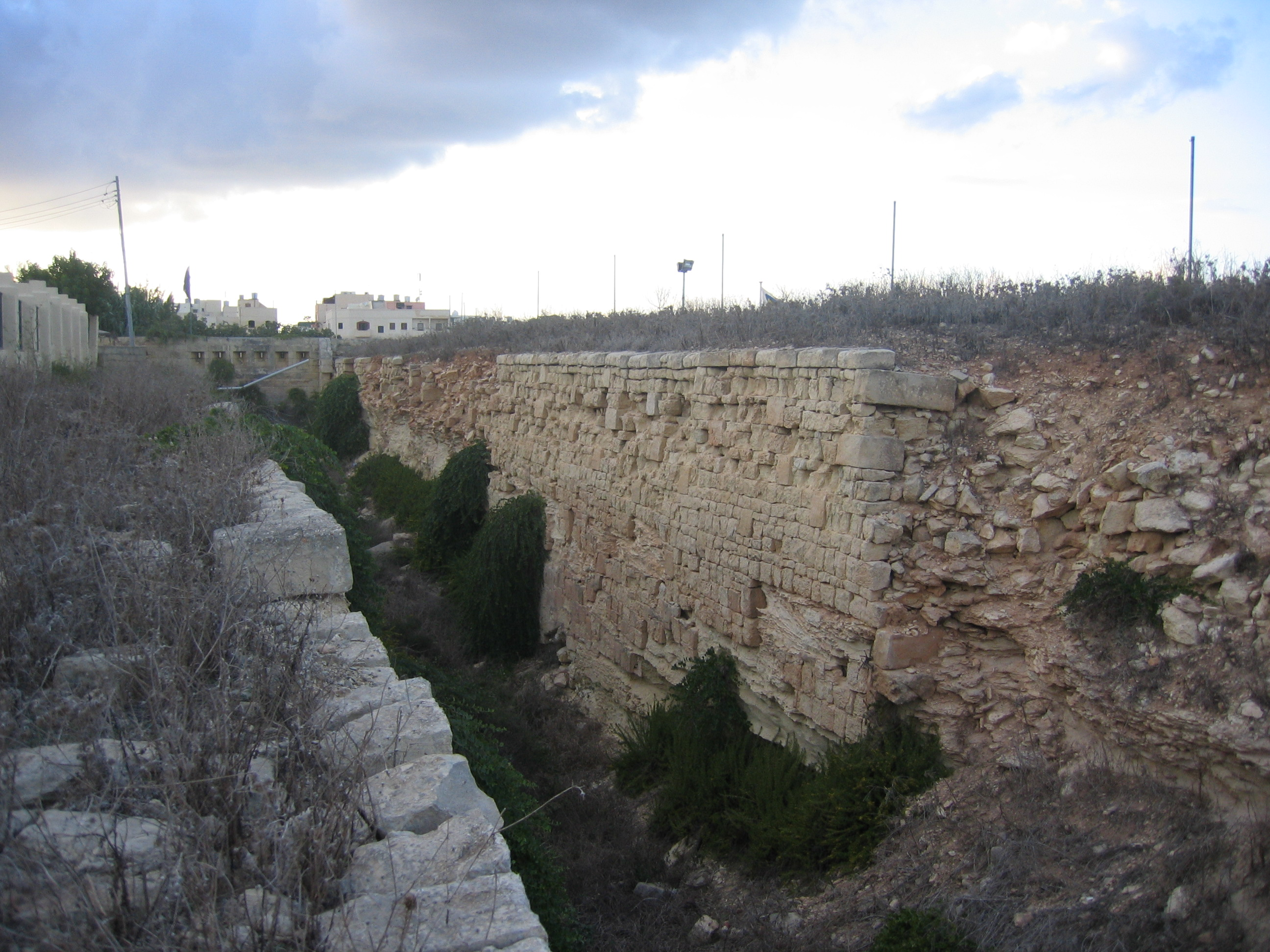
Looking along the rear ditch towards the causeway, where the musket ports that command the rear ditch, can be seen.

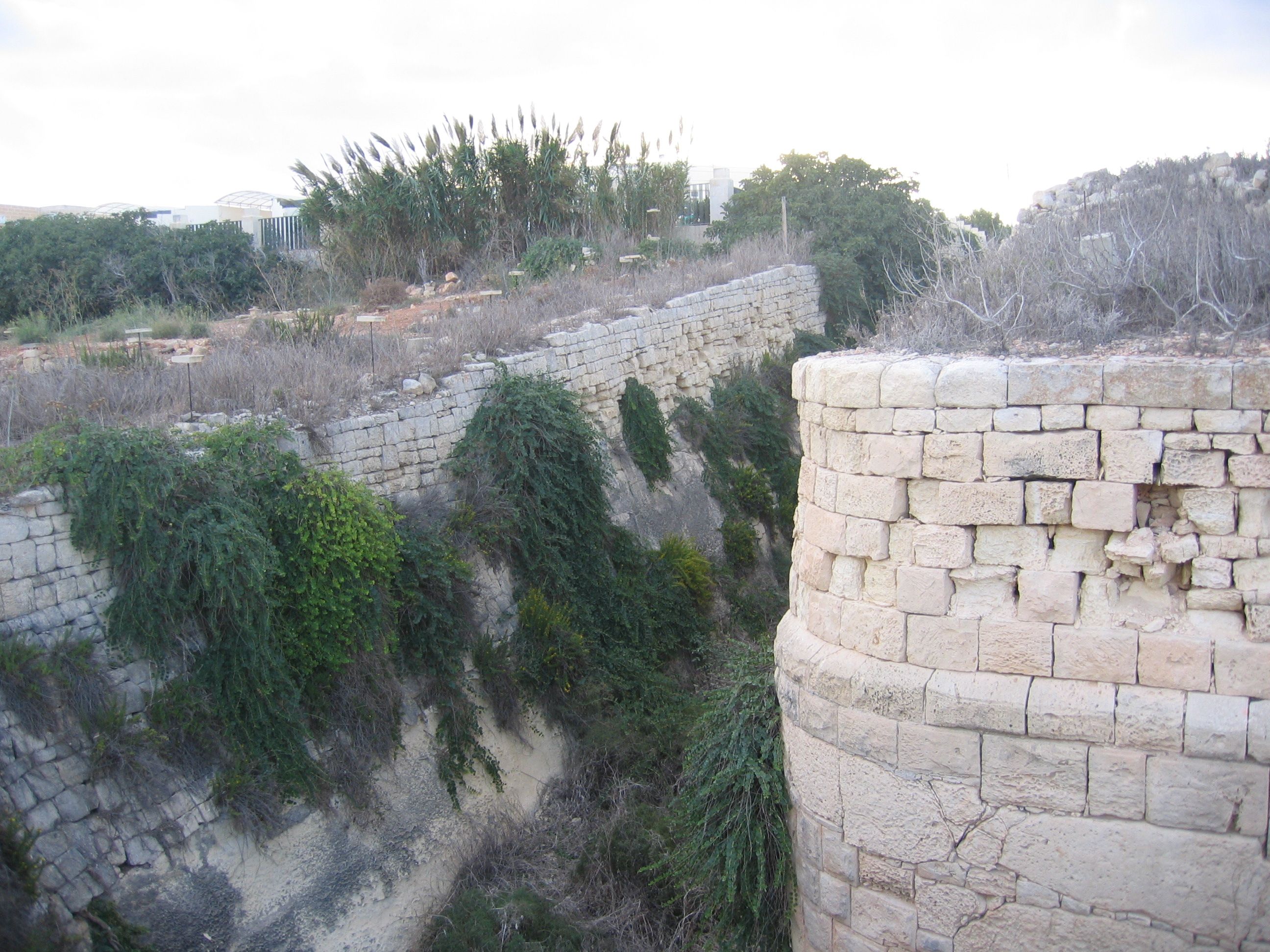
The corner of the ditch, where the right hand ditch and the rear ditch meet

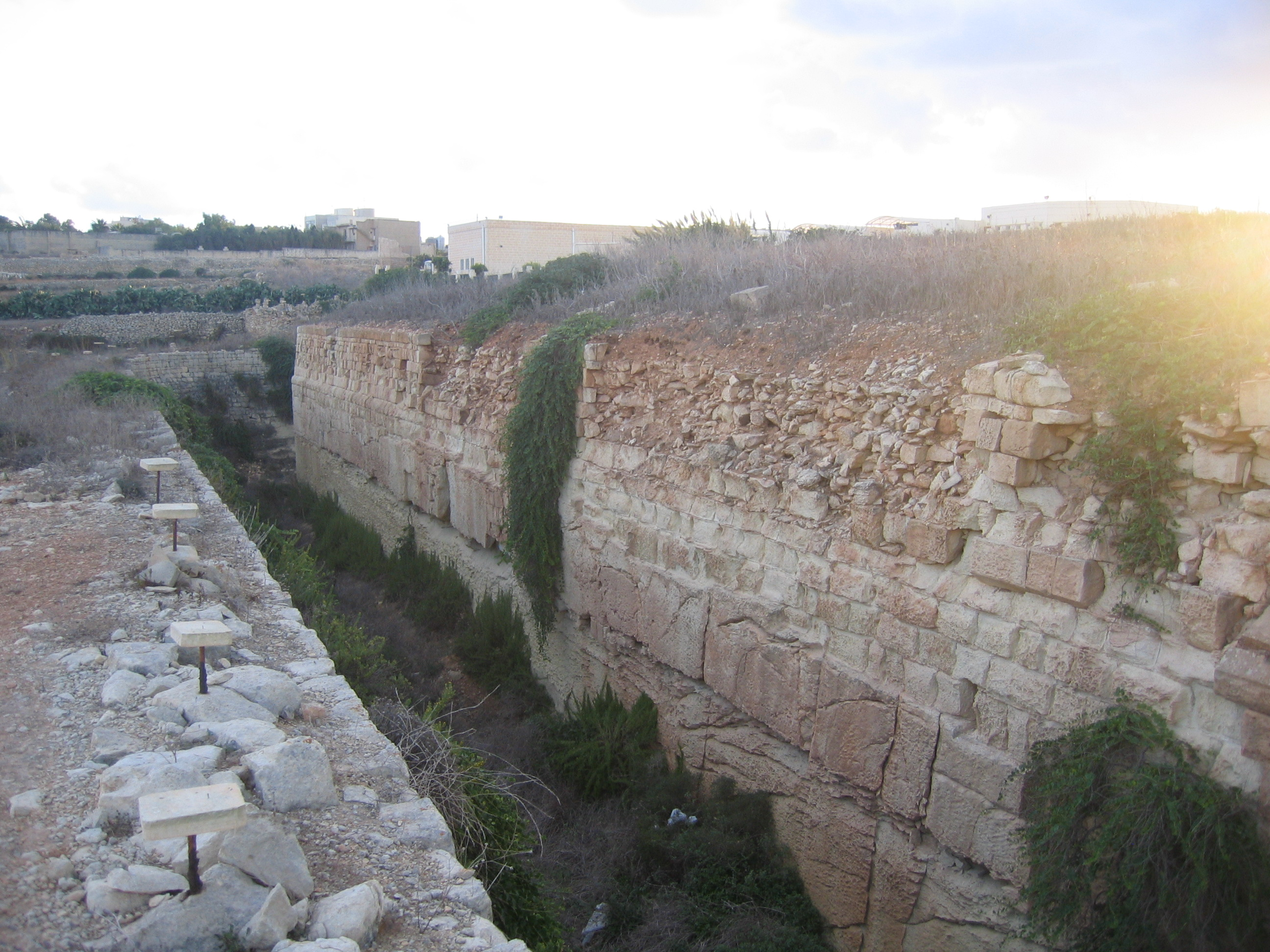
Looking towards the rear of the battery along the right hand ditch.

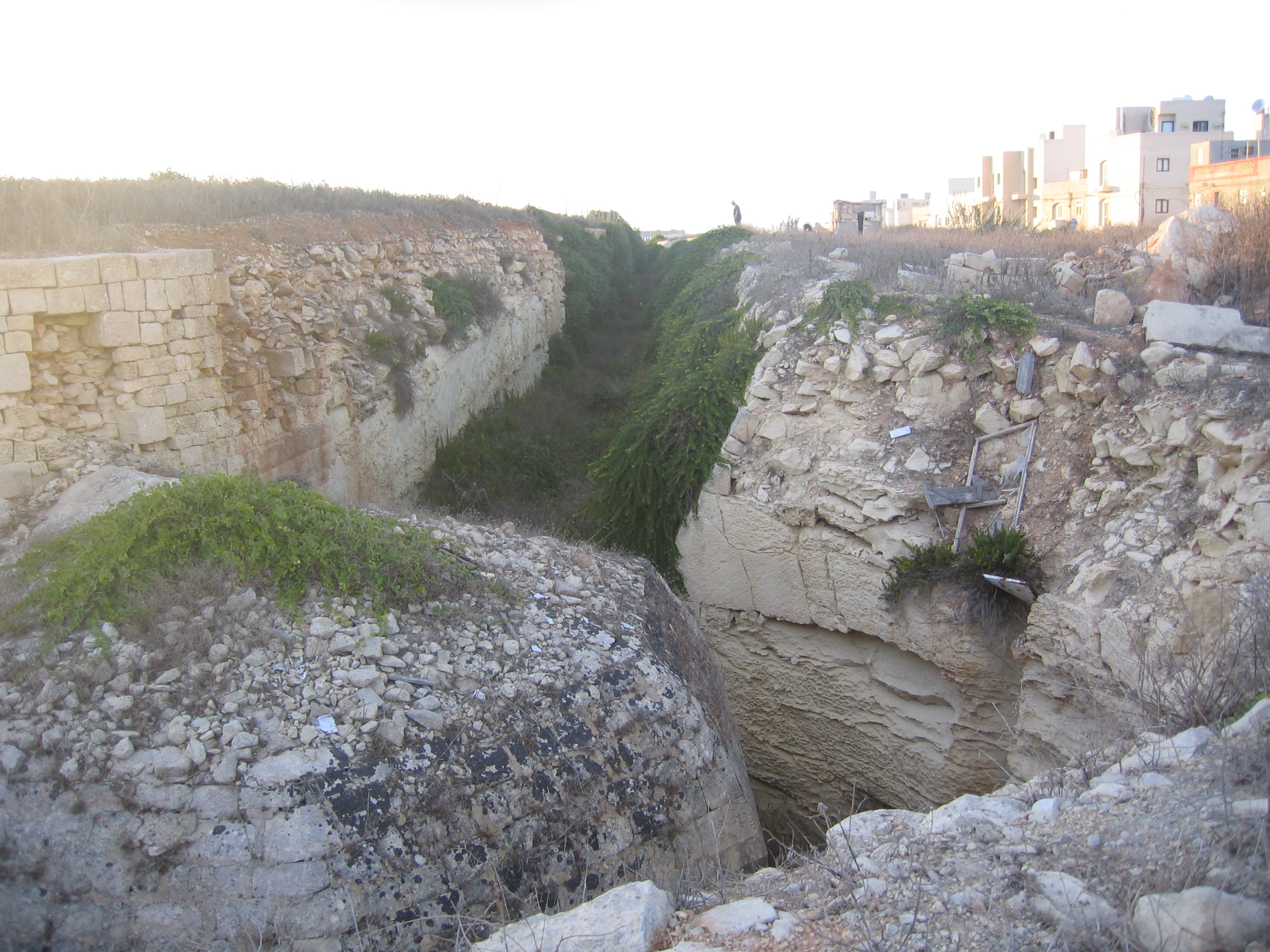
Looking down the forward ditch, along the line of fire of the right hand caponier.

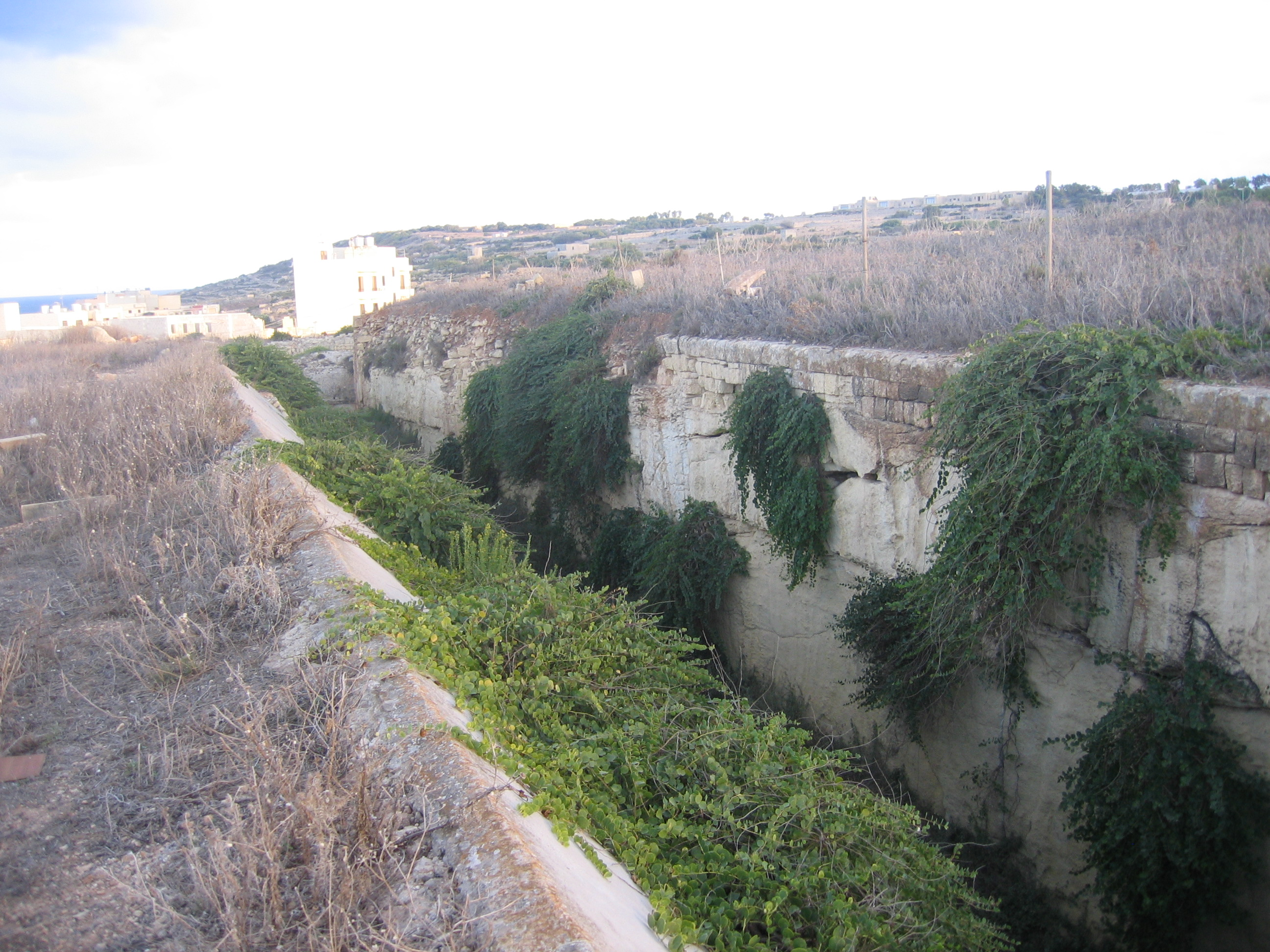
View along the forward ditch looking towards the right hand caponier.

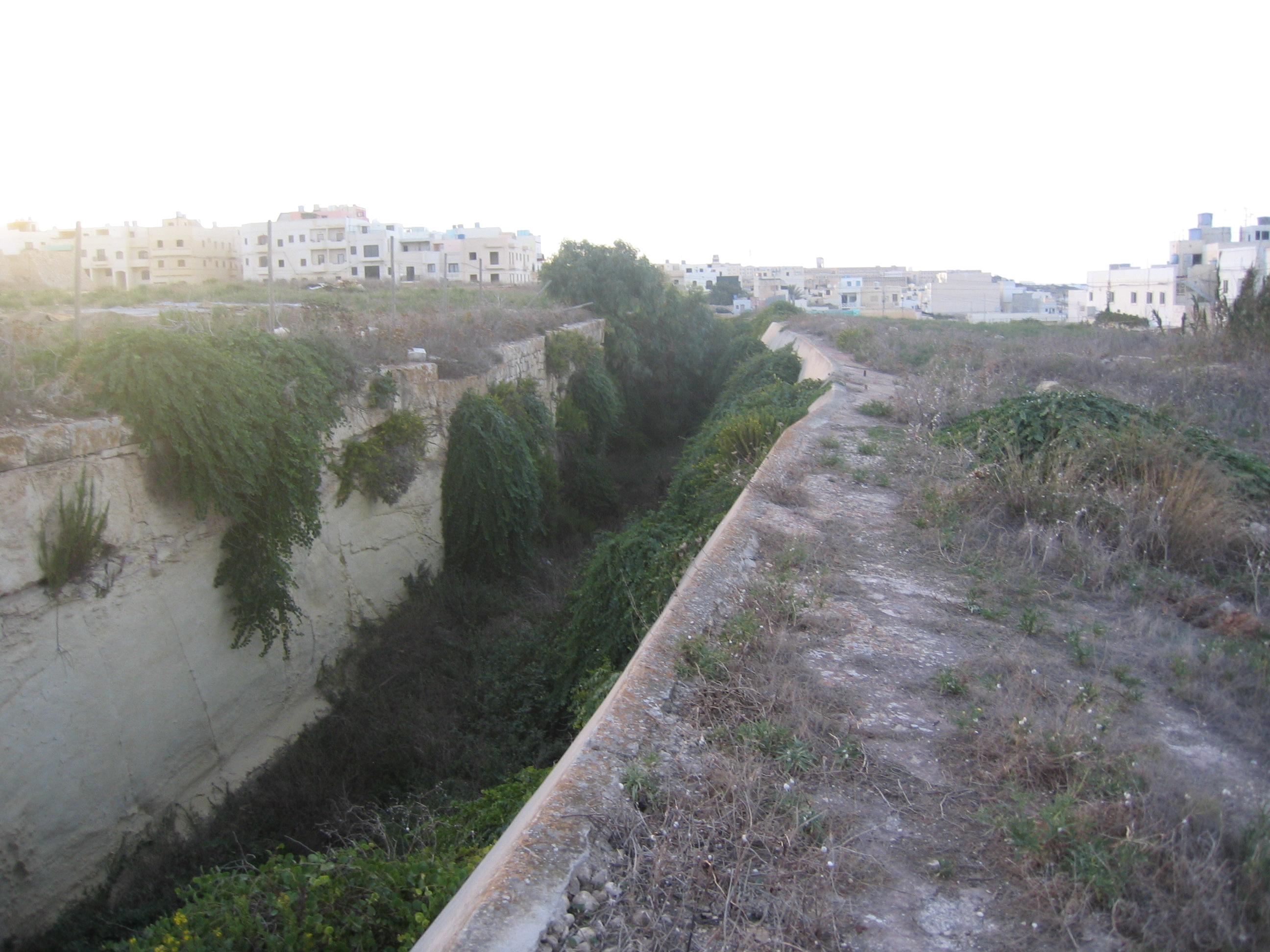
View along the forward ditch towards the left hand caponier in the distance.

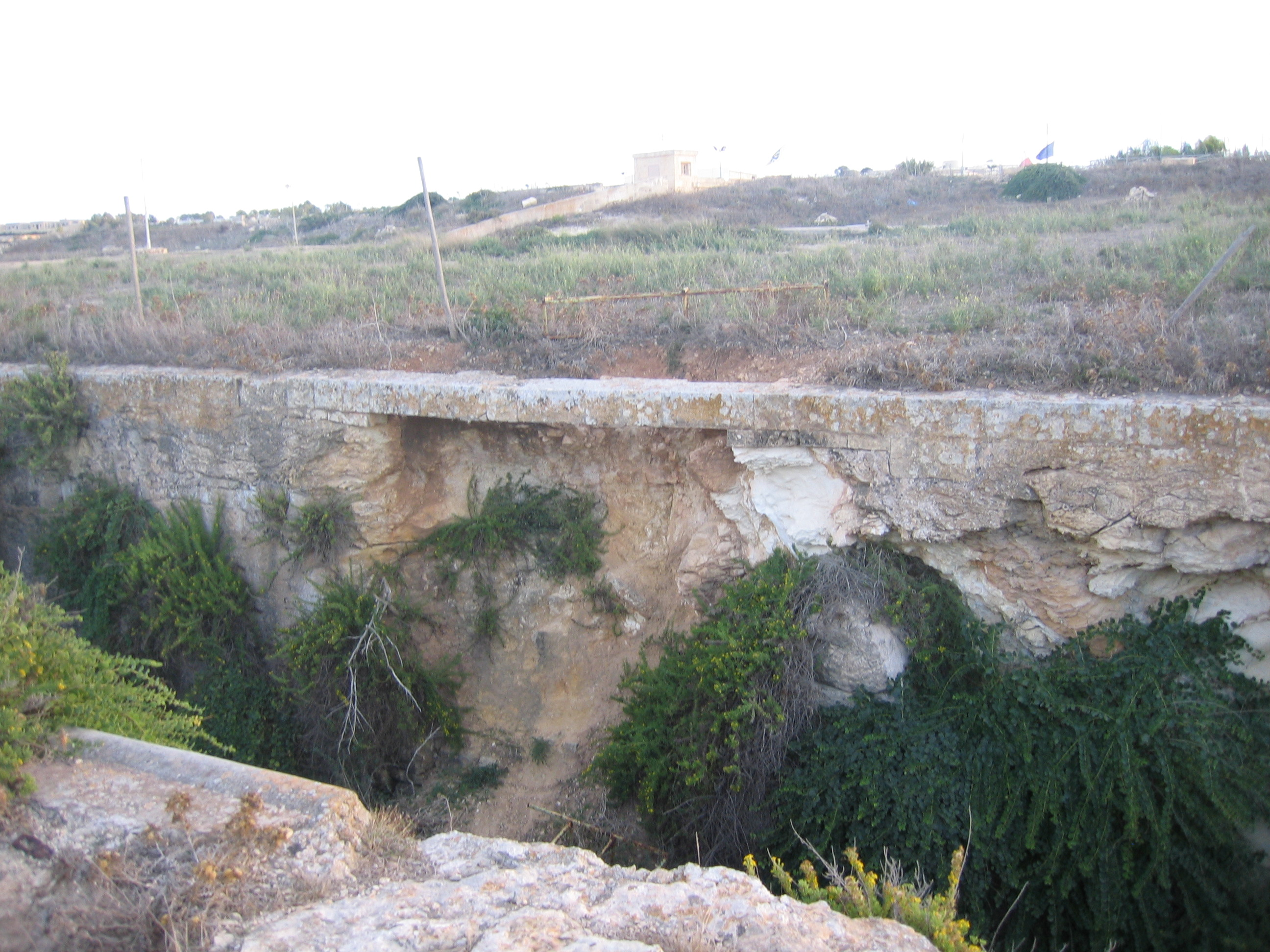
Looking into the battery across the forward ditch.

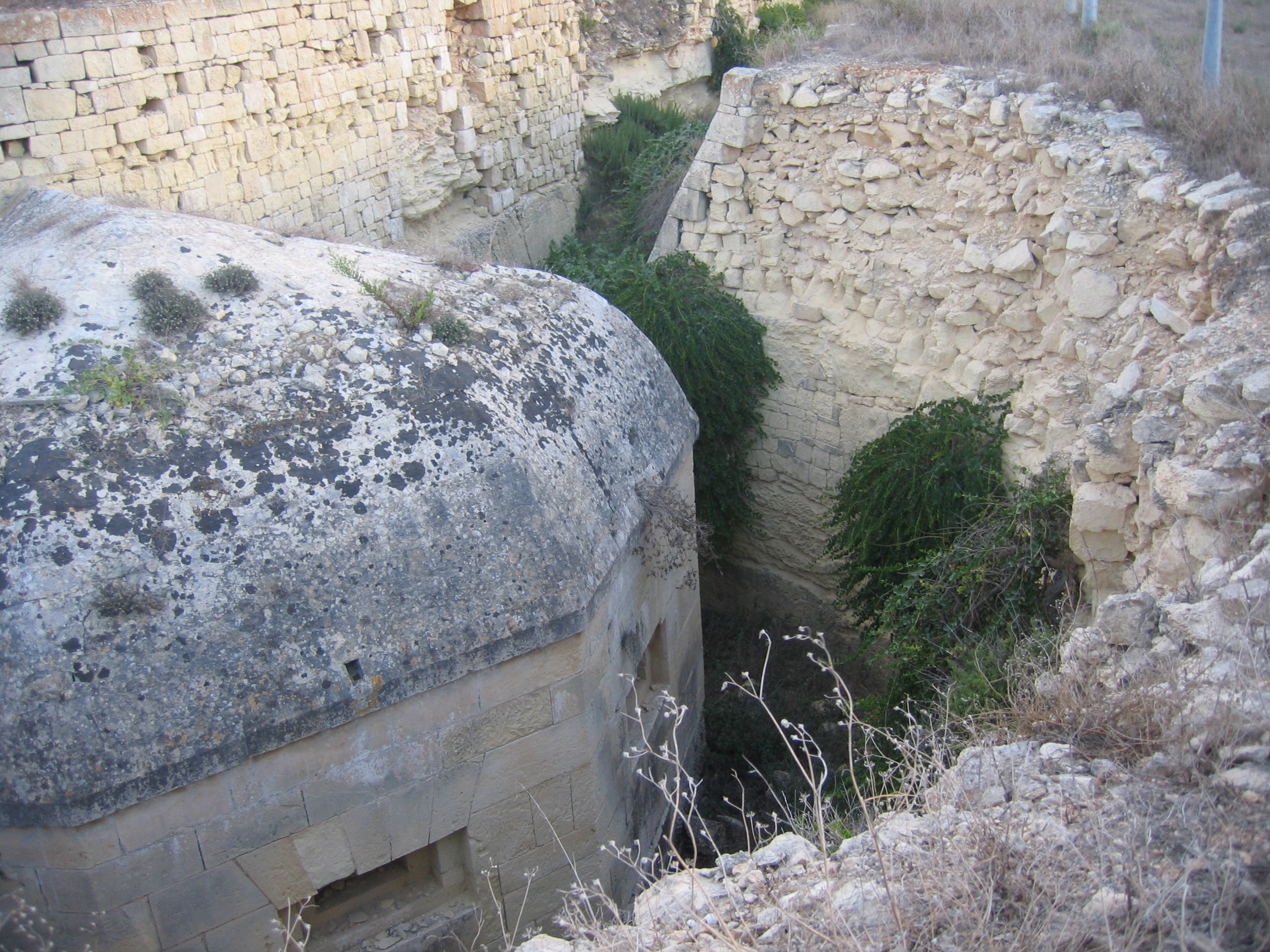
The bomb proof roof of the left hand caponier.

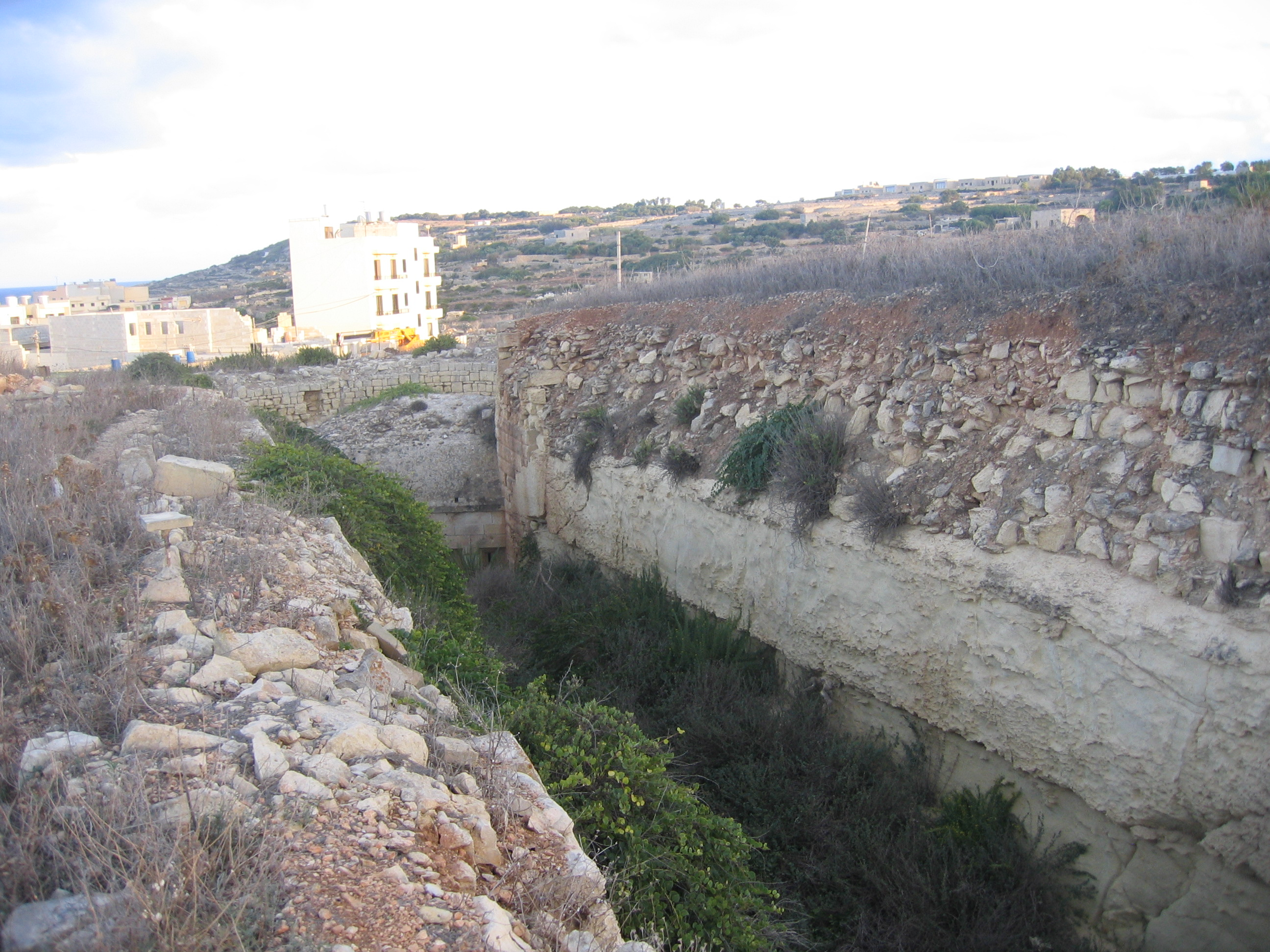
Looking down the left hand ditch of the battery, with the left caponier nestling in the ditch.
