= Saint Mary's Battery (Marsalforn) =

- Batterija ta' Santa Marija
- Marsalforn, Żebbuġ, Gozo, Malta

Site information
- Type: Artillery battery

Location
- Coordinates: 36°4′32.7″N 14°15′27.4″E

Site history
- Built: 1715
- Built by: Order of Saint John
- Materials: Limestone
- Fate: Demolished

Saint Mary's Battery (Maltese: Batterija ta' Santa Marija), also known as Qolla s-Safra Battery (Maltese: Batterija tal-Qolla s-Safra) or Gironda Battery (Maltese: Batterija ta' Gironda), was an artillery battery in Marsalforn, limits of Żebbuġ, Gozo, Malta. It was built by the Order of Saint John in 1715 as one of a series of coastal fortifications around the Maltese Islands.

The battery formed part of a chain of fortifications built to defend Marsalforn and nearby bays from Ottoman or Barbary attacks. Although the area was fortified by a number of towers, batteries, redoubts and entrenchments, all of these were destroyed except for Qolla l-Bajda Battery between Qbajjar and Xwejni Bays.

The battery consisted of a semi-circular gun platform ringed by a parapet, and two blockhouses joined by a wall. It was demolished and no remains can be seen.
