= Wilġa Battery =

Former artillery battery in Delimara, Marsaxlokk, Malta

- Batterija tal-Wilġa
- Marsaxlokk, Malta
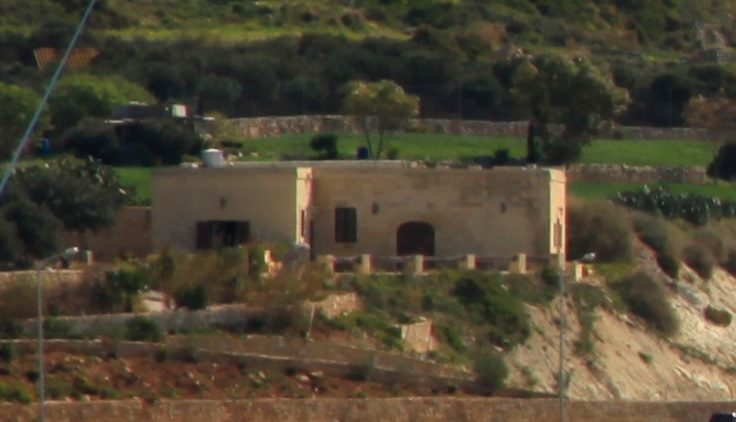
- Wilġa Battery's blockhouse

Site information
- Type: Artillery battery
- Owner: Government of Malta
- Controlled by: Private owner
- Condition: Blockhouse intact Gun platform largely destroyed

Location
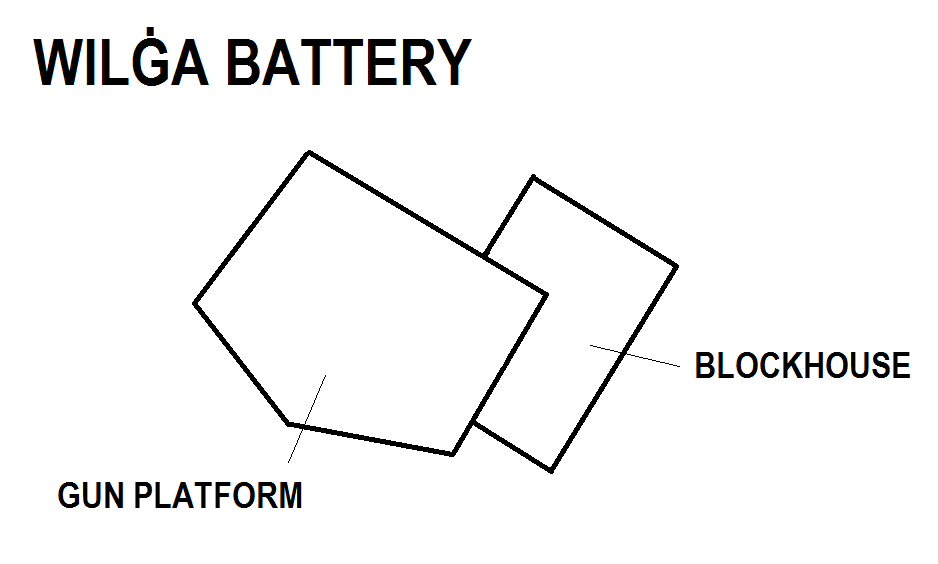
- Map of Wilġa Battery
- Coordinates: 35°50′10.1″N 14°33′7.8″E

Site history
- Built: 1714
- Built by: Order of Saint John
- Materials: Limestone
- Fate: Partially demolished, 1994

Wilġa Battery (Maltese: Batterija tal-Wilġa), also known as Saint James Battery (Maltese: Batterija ta' San Ġakbu) or Zondodari Battery (Maltese: Batterija ta' Zondodari), is a former artillery battery in Delimara, Marsaxlokk, Malta. It was built in 1714 by the Order of Saint John as one of a series of coastal fortifications around the Maltese Islands. Today, the battery's gun platform is largely destroyed, but its blockhouse remains intact and has been restored.

== History ==
Wilġa Battery was built in 1714 as part of a chain of fortifications that defended Marsaxlokk Bay, which also included six other batteries, the large St. Lucian Tower, two smaller De Redin towers, four redoubts and three entrenchments. It is located on the Delimara peninsula, roughly opposite St. Lucian Tower, and between Del Fango Redoubt and Delimara Tower.

The battery originally consisted of a large pentagonal gun platform, which lacked a parapet, with an L-shaped blockhouse on one side of the platform.

Over time, the roof of the blockhouse collapsed, leaving the structure in ruins. Most of the gun platform was demolished in 1994 to make way for the new road to the nearby Delimara Power Station.

The collapsed blockhouse of the battery was rebuilt. It was leased by the Lands Department to a private owner in 2004, and it is currently used for private functions.
