= Xrobb l-Għaġin Tower =

Watchtower in Malta

- Torri ta' Xrobb l-Għaġin
- Part of the De Redin towers
- Marsaxlokk, Malta
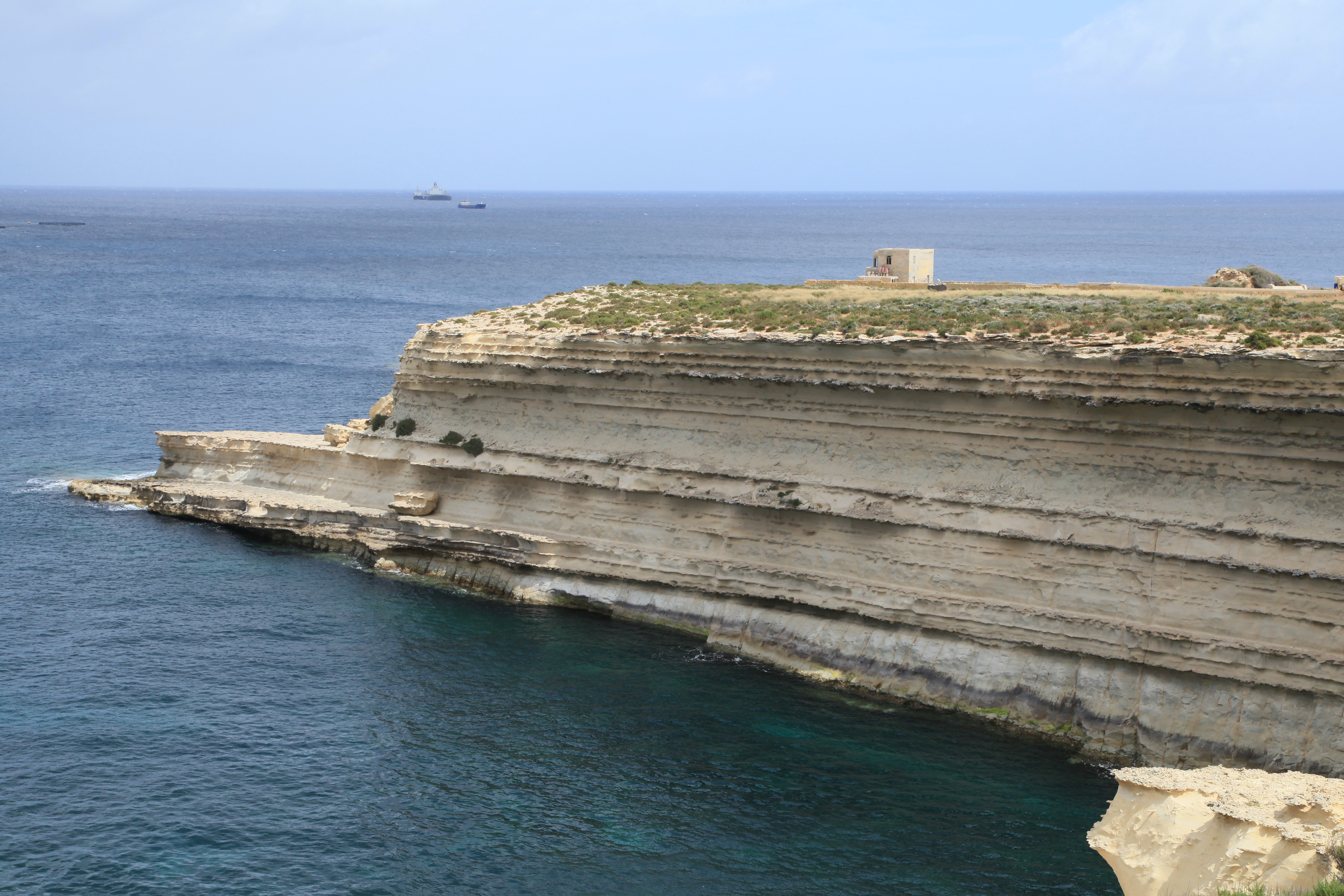
- Xrobb l-Għaġin Park, Triq Delimara in Marsaxlokk, Malta

Site information
- Type: Coastal watchtower
- Condition: Ruins

Location
- Coordinates: 35°50′28″N 14°34′16.5″E

Site history
- Built: 1659
- Built by: Order of Saint John
- Materials: Limestone

Xrobb l-Għaġin Tower (Maltese: Torri ta' Xrobb l-Għaġin), originally known as Torre di Siuarep, is a ruined watchtower in Xrobb l-Għaġin, limits of Marsaxlokk, Malta. It was built in 1659 as the eighth of the De Redin towers. An entrenchment with two redans was built around it in 1761. The tower is now largely destroyed since it was built of globigerina limestone which is prone to erosion. The remains of the tower's scarped base, as well as the general outline of the entrenchment, can still be seen.
