= Vendôme Tower =

Defensive structure in Malta

- Torri Vendôme
- Marsaxlokk, Malta
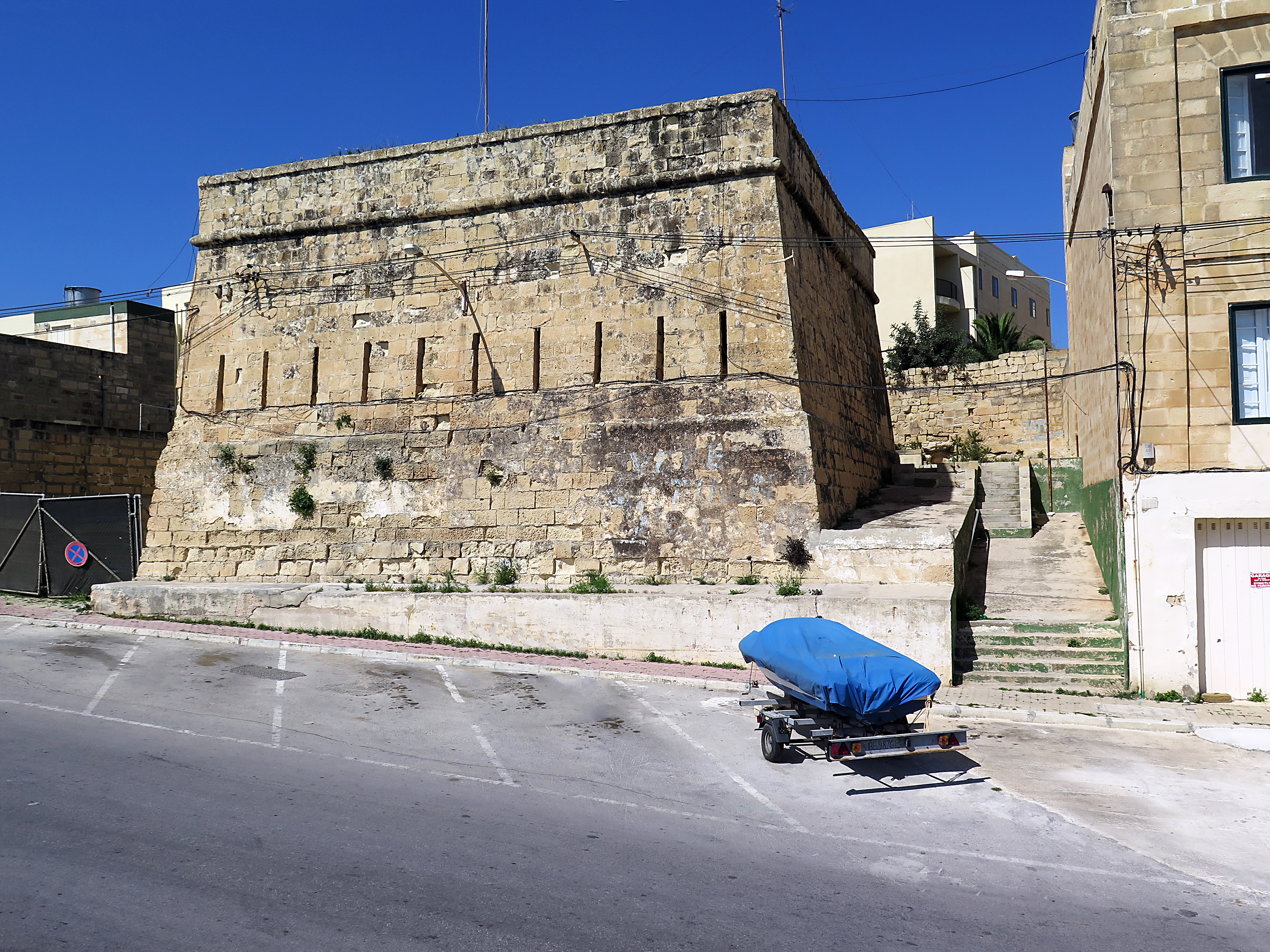
- View of Vendôme Tower

Site information
- Type: Tour-Reduit
- Owner: Government of Malta
- Controlled by: Marsaxlokk F.C.
- Open to the public: No
- Condition: Intact

Location
- Coordinates: 35°50′13.9″N 14°32′39.5″E

Site history
- Built: 1715
- Built by: Order of Saint John
- Materials: Limestone

Vendôme Tower (Maltese: Torri Vendôme, colloquially Torri tal-Vandomu) is a tour-reduit in Marsaxlokk, Malta. It was built by the Order of Saint John in 1715 as one of a series of fortifications around the coasts of the Maltese Islands. It is the only surviving tour-reduit in Malta. Today, Vendôme Tower houses the headquarters of Marsaxlokk F.C.

The tour-reduit is also known by several other names, including Vendôme Redoubt (Maltese: Ridott ta' Vendôme), Qrajten Redoubt or Craite Redoubt (Maltese: Ridott tal-Qrajten) and Fisheries Redoubt.

== History ==
Vendôme Tower was built between 1715 and 1716 as part of the Order of Saint John's first building program of coastal fortifications. It was one of four tour-reduits built in Malta, with the other three being Fresnoy Redoubt, Spinola Redoubt and Marsalforn Tower. However, the others were all demolished, leaving Vendôme Tower as the only one of its kind.

The tower was named after Philippe de Vendôme, the Grand Prior of France. He was the military advisor who advocated for the building of many batteries and redoubts in Malta. In fact, a number of other batteries and redoubts are also known by the name Vendôme Battery or Vendôme Redoubt.

The structure is essentially a tower-like blockhouse with a square plan. It has sloping walls topped by a parapet, and the walls are pierced with musketry loopholes. The structure was originally surrounded by a ditch, with a drawbridge leading to the main entrance. However, the ditch no longer exists. The interior of the tower consists of two rooms and a staircase leading to the roof. A chapel was also located in the tower.

The tower was intended to prevent enemy ships from landing at Marsaxlokk Bay. It was part of a chain of fortifications defending the bay, which also included the large Saint Lucian Tower, two smaller De Redin towers, seven coastal batteries, four redoubts and three entrenchments.

== Present day ==
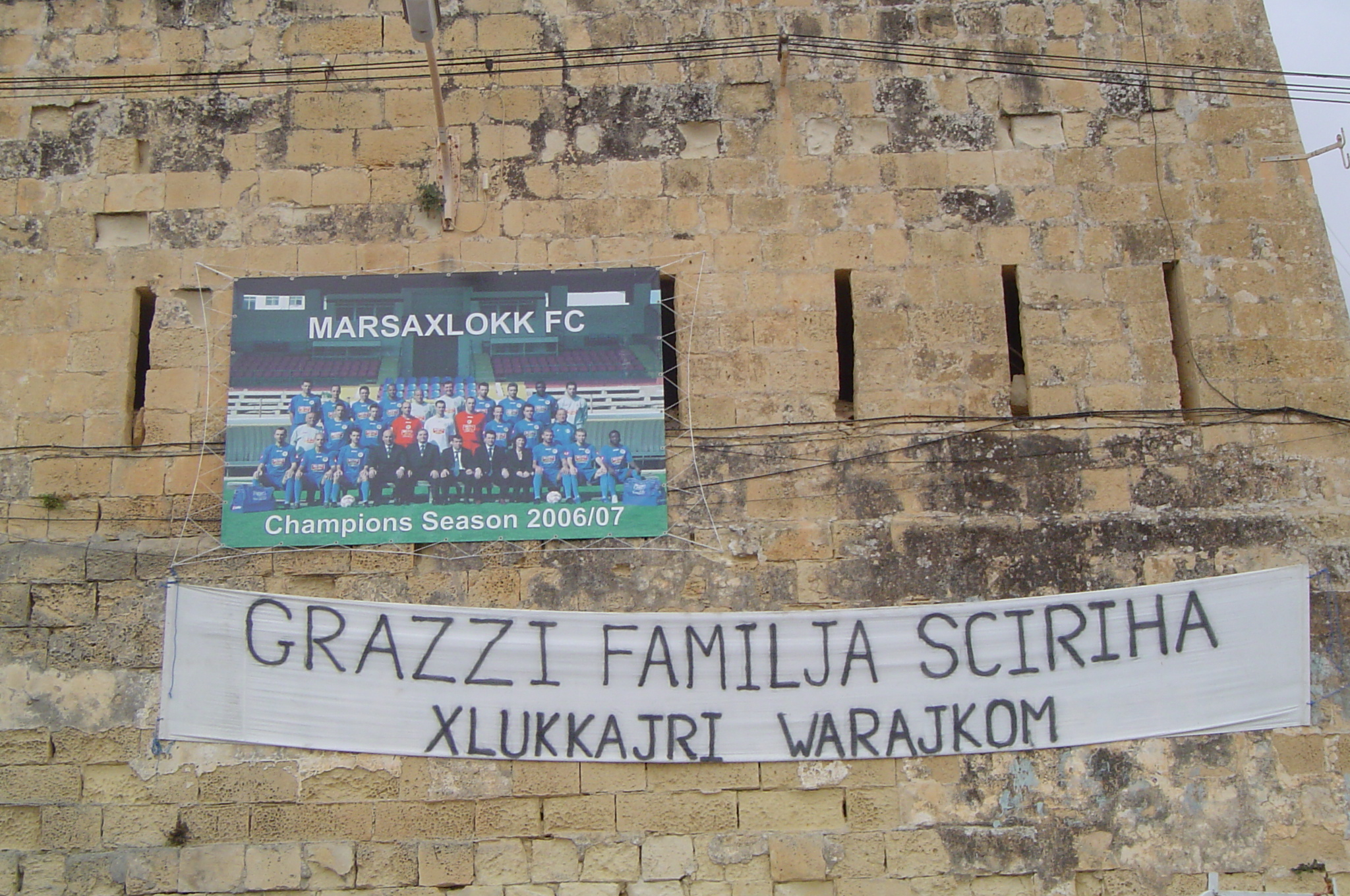
Vendôme Tower is now the headquarters of Marsaxlokk F.C.

Today, Vendôme Tower is used as the headquarters of Marsaxlokk F.C., and it is not open to the public. The southern and western walls are in need of restoration.
