= Spinola Redoubt =

Historical defensive fort in Malta (1715-?)

- Ridott ta' Spinola
- Birżebbuġa, Malta

Site information
- Type: Tour-Reduit

Location
- Coordinates: 35°49′31.7″N 14°31′43.2″E

Site history
- Built: 1715–1716
- Built by: Order of Saint John
- Materials: Limestone
- Fate: Demolished

Spinola Redoubt (Maltese: Ridott ta' Spinola), also known as Birżebbuġa Redoubt (Maltese: Ridott ta' Birżebbuġa), was a tour-reduit in Birżebbuġa, Malta. It was built by the Order of Saint John in 1715–1716 as one of a series of coastal fortifications around the Maltese Islands. It has been demolished.

== History ==
Spinola Redoubt was built in 1715–1716 as part of a chain of fortifications that defended Marsaxlokk Bay, which also included three other redoubts, the large Saint Lucian Tower, two smaller De Redin towers, seven batteries and three entrenchments. The nearest fortifications to Spinola Redoubt were Pinto Battery to the northeast and Birżebbuġa Entrenchments to the south.

Spinola Redoubt was one of four tour-reduits built in Malta, with the other three being Fresnoy Redoubt, Vendôme Tower and Marsalforn Tower. It had a square shape, similar to the surviving Vendôme Tower.

The redoubt has been demolished and its site is now a public garden.

== See also ==
- Spinola Battery
