= Marsalforn Tower =

Former Wignacourt tower (1616-1715) in Malta and its replacement (1720-1915)

- Torri ta' Marsalforn
- Part of the Wignacourt towers
- Xagħra, Gozo, Malta

Site information
- Type: Coastal watchtower
- Condition: Mound of rubble still visible

Location
- Coordinates: 36°4′15.2″N 14°15′54.8″E

Site history
- Built: c. 1614–1616
- Built by: Order of Saint John
- In use: 1616–1715
- Materials: Limestone
- Fate: Collapsed or demolished, c. 1715

Garrison information
- Past commanders: Giovanni Paolo Azzopardi (1616); Domenico Azzupardi (1715)

Marsalforn Tower (Maltese: Torri ta' Marsalforn) refers to two towers that stood near Marsalforn, in the limits of Xagħra, Gozo, Malta. The first one was built in 1616, as the fourth of six Wignacourt towers, and collapsed around 1715. The second was a Tour-reduit, which was built in 1720 and demolished in 1915.

Both towers formed part of a chain of fortifications built to defend the town of Marsalforn and nearby bays from Ottoman or Barbary attacks. Although the area was fortified by several towers, batteries, redoubts and entrenchments, the only surviving vestige of these is Qolla l-Bajda Battery between Qbajjar and Xwejni Bays.

== First tower ==
The first tower, which was also known as Xagħra Tower (Maltese: Torri tax-Xagħra), was the fourth of the Wignacourt towers. Construction started around 1614 or 1615, and the tower was completed in 1616. The tower commanded Marsalforn Bay to the west, and Ramla Bay to the east, effectively guarding the northern approach to Gozo. It was clearly visible from the northern walls of the Cittadella, so it could communicate directly with the garrison there.

Its design was attributed to the military engineer Giovanni Rinaldini. This tower was probably not financed by Wignacourt like the other towers, but by the Order itself, and the cost of building it is not known. The tower's design is completely different from the other Wignacourt towers, since it did not have any turrets. It had a square base, and roughly the same size as the Wignacourt Tower in St. Paul's Bay.

The tower was built on the edge of a cliff, which was prone to erosion. In 1681, it was briefly abandoned after part of the cliff face collapsed. The Order still kept a garrison in the tower, but further damage was sustained in the 1693 Sicily earthquake, when cracks on the cliff face extended to beneath the tower. The Order sent an engineer to inspect the damage, but he believed that the tower would remain standing for at least another century. However, new cracks developed by 1701, and plans were made to abandon the tower and build a new one to replace it.

Marsalforn Tower was still in operation in 1715, when Philippe de Vendôme visited it and was greeted with a five-gun salute by the tower's Castellan, Domenico Azzupardi. The tower disappears from military records after this visit, and is believed to have collapsed or was dismantled later in 1715 or 1716.

The only ruins of the tower visible today is a mound of rubble at the edge of the cliff face.

== Second tower ==
Marsalforn Tower
- Torri ta' Marsalforn
- Xagħra, Gozo, Malta
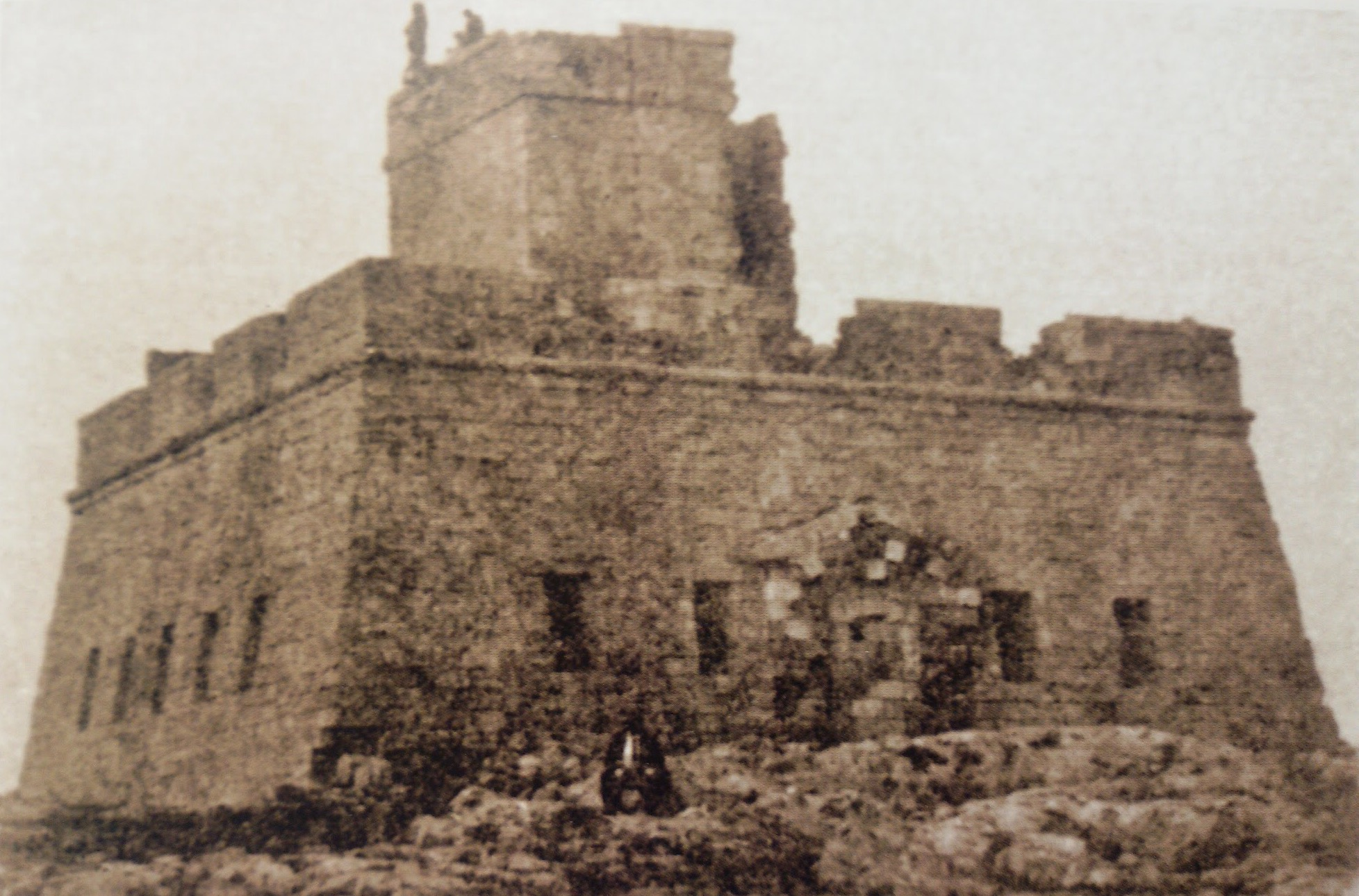
- View of the partially ruined tower, c. 1910

Site information
- Type: Tour-Reduit
- Condition: Some foundations reportedly visible

Location
- Coordinates: 36°4′10.8″N 14°15′58.8″E

Site history
- Built: c. 1720–1722
- Built by: Order of Saint John
- Materials: Limestone
- Fate: Demolished, 1915

The second Marsalforn Tower was built in the centre of the tal-Qortin plateau some time after the first tower had collapsed. Construction is believed to have begun sometime in 1720, and the tower was first mentioned in official records on 10 May 1722, when it was complete but still lacking its door and drawbridge. This tower was also known as the Perellos Tower (Maltese: Torri ta' Perellos) after Grand Master Ramon Perellos y Roccaful, and was designed by the military engineer Charles François de Mondion.

Although called a tower, this was actually a tour-reduit, one of only four to be built in Malta (and the only one in Gozo). The other three were Fresnoy Redoubt, Spinola Redoubt, and Vendôme Tower, all of which were located around Marsaxlokk Bay. Only Vendôme Tower survives today.

The structure was essentially a tower-like blockhouse with a square plan. It had sloping walls pierced with musketry loopholes, which were topped by a parapet with three embrasures on each side, mounting several cannon. A vedette accessed by a flight of steps was located at the centre of the tower. The structure had a ditch, with a drawbridge leading to the main entrance. A chapel was also located in the tower.

The only known photograph of the tower was taken by the photographer Michele Farrugia around 1910. By this time, the tower was partially in ruins, and part of the central vedette had already collapsed. This tower was demolished by the British military in 1915, and a wireless station was built in its place. The station was pulled down four years later in 1919.

Some foundations of the tower are still reportedly visible.
