= Spinola Battery =

- Batterija ta' Spinola
- St. Julian's, Malta

Site information
- Type: Artillery battery

Location
- Coordinates: 35°55′15.8″N 14°29′34.2″E

Site history
- Built: 1889–1894
- Built by: British Empire
- In use: 1894–1940s
- Materials: Concrete
- Fate: Demolished
- Battles/wars: World War II

Spinola Battery (Maltese: Batterija ta' Spinola), also known as Fort Spinola, was an artillery battery in St. Julian's, Malta. It was built by the British between 1889 and 1894, and it was demolished to make way for hotels and a yacht marina.

== History ==
Construction of Spinola Battery began in 1889 and was completed in 1894, at a cost of around £5000. It was part of a new series of fortifications meant to house breech-loading (BL) guns.

Spinola Battery was located behind the Spinola Entrenchment, an 18th-century bastioned entrenchment wall stretching from St. Julian's Bay to St. George's Bay. It had a pentagonal shape, and was armed with four guns, including two 9.2-inch BL guns. Its armament was removed in 1907.

The battery was converted and developed into a hospital, known as the Spinola Hospital, during World War I. It served as a hospital from 16 November 1915 till 27 April 1917. It was designed to serve for roughly 1000 patients, but during the war it had served for a maximum of 1168. The battery saw use again in World War II, when it was armed with 4.5-inch anti-aircraft guns. It was severely damaged by aerial bombardment.

In 1969, it was used as a film sound studio, known as Intermed, later, as Brittania Studios. The studio was exactly situated behind the Millenium Chapel, now, a supermarket. Some of the films that made use of this sound stage were: Orca the killer whale, Zeppelin, Murpheys War, The Mcintosh man, Pulp, Raise the Titanic. Actors: Michael Cane, Mickey Roony, Charlotte Ramplin, Paul Newman, Peter O'Toole.

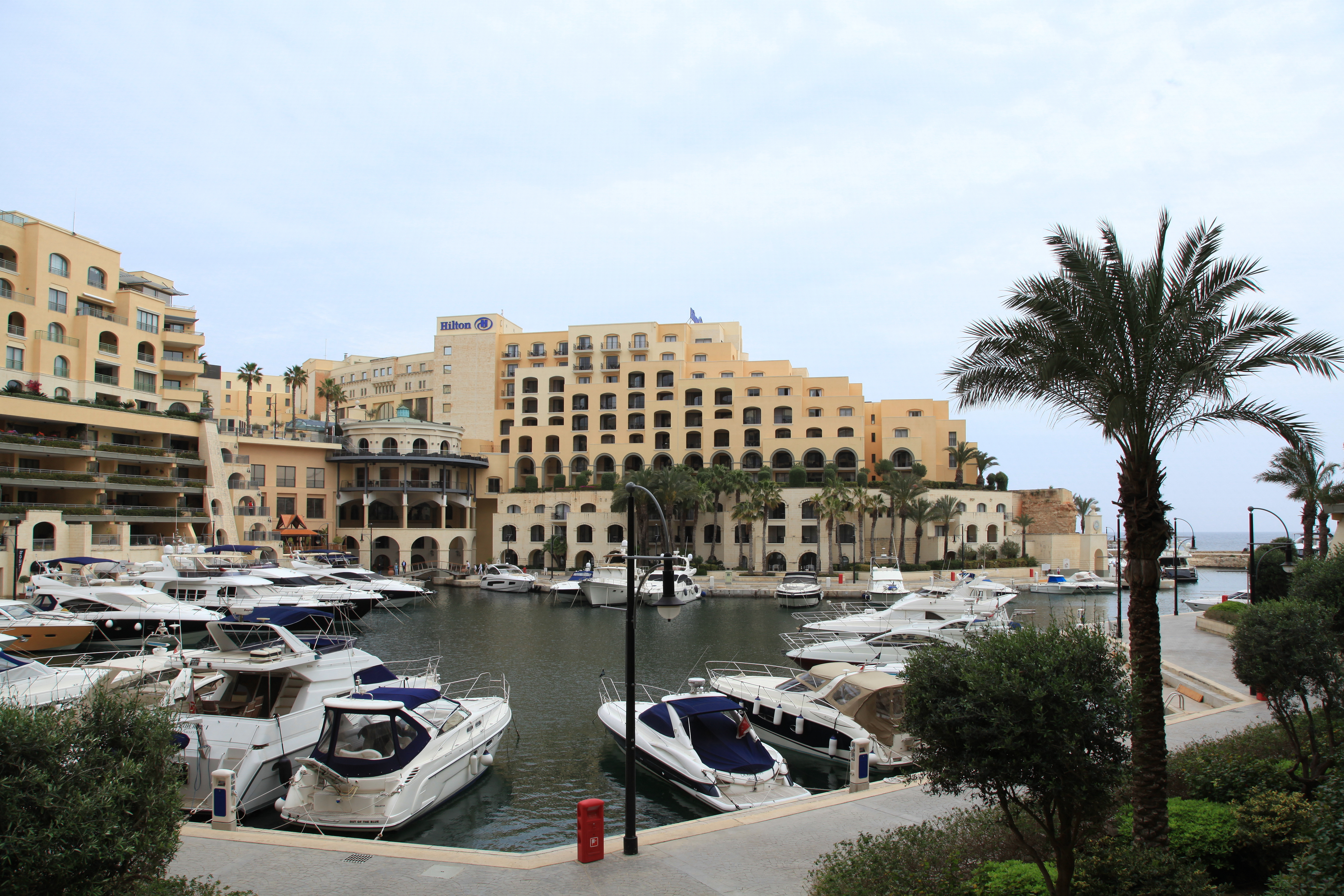
The site of the battery is now the Portomaso Marina

The Hilton Malta Hotel was built in 1967 on the site of the battery. The hotel and any remains of the battery were later completely demolished to make way for the Portomaso Marina and a new Hilton hotel.

== See also ==
- Spinola Redoubt
