= Index of Malta-related articles =

This page list topics related to Malta.

== 0-9 ==
- 93.3 Central FM
- 1693 Sicily earthquake
- 2012 in Malta
- 2013 in Malta
- 2014 in Malta
- 2015 in Malta

== A ==
- Abortion in Malta
- Action of 1595
- Action of 26 June 1625
- Action of 27 August 1661
- Admiralty House (Valletta)
- Giovanni Pietro Francesco Agius de Soldanis
- Aħrax Tower
- Air Malta
- Air Wing of the Armed Forces of Malta
- Akkademja tal-Malti
- American University of Malta
- Angel (Chiara song)
- Another Summer Night
- Aquatic Sports Association of Malta
- Armed Forces of Malta
- Armenians in Malta
- Armier Bay
- Armoury (Siġġiewi)
- Arrias Battery
- Attard
- Attard (surname)
- Giovanni Attard
- Auberge d'Allemagne
- Auberge d'Allemagne, Birgu
- Auberge d'Angleterre
- Auberge d'Aragon
- Auberge d'Aragon, Birgu
- Auberge d'Auvergne
- Auberge d'Auvergne et Provence
- Auberge de Bavière
- Auberge de Castille
- Auberge de Castille et Portugal
- Auberge de France
- Auberge de France, Birgu
- Auberge d'Italie
- Auberge d'Italie, Birgu
- Auberge de Provence
- Australia Hall
- Australia–Malta relations
- Award of the George Cross to Malta
- Azure Window

== B ==
- Baħar iċ-Ċagħaq
- Baħar iċ-Ċagħaq Redoubt
- Baħrija
- Bakery of the Order of St. John
- Balbani Battery
- Balzan
- Banca Giuratale (Mdina)
- Banca Giuratale (Valletta)
- Banca Giuratale (Victoria, Gozo)
- Bank of Valletta
- Giovanni Barbara
- Battle of Malta poker tournament
- Bay Radio (Malta)
- Bays and creeks in Malta
- Believe 'n Peace
- Andrea Belli
- Bengħisa Tower
- Bible translations into Maltese
- BirdLife Malta
- Birgu
- Birgu Clock Tower
- Birkirkara
- Birkirkara Tower
- Birżebbuġa
- Black Monday (Malta)
- Blat Mogħża Tower
- Blata l-Bajda
- Giuseppe Bonavia
- Bondi Plus
- Giuseppe Bonici
- Bontadino de Bontadini
- Borġ in-Nadur
- Vincenzo Borg
- Carmelo Borg Pisani
- Briconet Redoubt
- Bubaqra
- Bubaqra Tower
- Buġibba
- Buġibba Battery
- Buġibba Temple
- Burmarrad

== C ==
- Cabinet of Malta
- Antonio Cachia
- Domenico Cachia
- Michele Cachia
- Cambridge Battery
- Capital punishment in Malta
- Capital Radio Malta
- Captain's Tower
- Capuchin Convent Battery
- Carnival tragedy of 1823
- Casa Cosmana Navarra
- Casa del Commun Tesoro
- Casa Leoni
- Castello Dei Baroni
- Catacombs of Malta
- Girolamo Cassar
- Saverio Cassar
- Vittorio Cassar
- Castellania (Valletta)
- Castello Lanzun
- Cathedral of the Assumption, Victoria
- Cavalier Tower
- Central Region, Malta
- Destiny Chukunyere
- Ndubisi Chukunyere
- Chief Justice of Malta
- Christianity in Malta
- Church of Our Lady of Liesse
- Church of St Augustine, Victoria
- Cittadella (Gozo)
- City Gate (Valletta)
- Coat of arms of Malta
- Coins of the Maltese lira
- Madeleine Collinson
- Colonna Mediterranea
- Comino
- Cominotto
- Commemorative coins of Malta
- Commission for the Administration of Justice of Malta
- Commonwealth Heads of Government Meeting 2005
- Commonwealth Heads of Government Meeting 2015
- Communist Party of Malta
- Confederation of Malta Trade Unions
- Conspiracy of the Slaves
- Constitutional Party (Malta)
- Corradino Batteries
- Corradino Lines
- Corte Capitanale
- Cospicua
- Cottonera Lines
- Could It Be (Georgina & Paul Giordimaina song)
- Count of Malta
- Courts of Justice building (Valletta)
- Emvin Cremona
- Crivelli Redoubt
- Crown Colony of Malta
- Culture of Malta
- Cycling in Malta
- Cyprus–Malta relations

== Ċ ==
- Ċirkewwa

== D ==
- Daħlet Qorrot
- De Redin towers
- De Rohan Arch
- Del Fango Redoubt
- Delimara Lighthouse
- Delimara Tower
- Delimara Transmitter
- Della Grazie Battery
- De La Salle College (Malta)
- Dellia Battery
- Democratic Party (Malta)
- Demographics of Malta
- Deputy Prime Minister of Malta
- Designers of Maltese stamps
- Dingli
- Districts of Malta
- Dragonara Palace
- Dwejra Tower

== E ==
- Economy of Malta
- Education in Malta
- Elections in Malta
- Elminiech Battery
- Empire Stadium (Gżira)
- Endemic Maltese wildlife
- Energy in Malta
- Epic
- Euro gold and silver commemorative coins (Malta)
- European 2000 Airlines
- 2004 European Parliament election in Malta
- 2009 European Parliament election in Malta
- 2014 European Parliament election in Malta
- Extreme points of Malta

== F ==
- Falca Lines
- Fawwara Gate
- Fedeau Battery
- Ferretti Battery
- Festival Kanzunetta Indipendenza
- Fgura
- Finance Minister of Malta
- Flag and coat of arms of the Sovereign Military Order of Malta
- Flag of Malta
- Fleur-de-Lys, Malta
- Flora of Malta
- Floriana
- Floriana Lines
- Fomm ir-Riħ
- Fontana, Gozo
- Football in Malta
- Fort Benghisa
- Fort Binġemma
- Fort Campbell
- Fort Chambray
- Fort Delimara
- Fort Leonardo
- Fort Madalena
- Fort Manoel
- Fort Mellieħa
- Fort Mosta
- Fort Pembroke
- Fort Ricasoli
- Fort Rinella
- Fort Saint Angelo
- Fort Saint Elmo
- Fort San Lucian
- Fort Saint Michael
- Fort Saint Rocco
- Fort San Salvatore
- Fort Tas-Silġ
- Fort Tigné
- Fort Verdala
- Fortifications Interpretation Centre
- Fortifications of Birgu
- Fortifications of Malta
- Fortifications of Mdina
- Fortifications of Senglea
- Fortifications of Valletta
- Fortini Ground
- Freedom Day (Malta)
- Freemasonry in Malta
- French occupation of Malta
- Fresnoy Redoubt
- Friends of the Earth (Malta)
- Froberg mutiny

== Ġ ==
- Ġebel ġol-Baħar
- Ġebel San Pietru
- Ġgantija
- Ġnejna Bay
- Ġnien is-Sultan

== G ==
- Emanuele Luigi Galizia
- Ganutell
- Garden Battery
- Martin Garzez
- Garzes Tower
- Gauci Tower
- General Retailers and Traders Union
- General Workers' Union (Malta)
- Geography of Malta
- Carlo Gimach
- Giordan Lighthouse
- Girgenti Palace
- Gourgion Tower
- Government of Malta
- Governor-General of Malta
- Gozo
- Gozo (independent state)
- Gozo (region)
- Gozo Aqueduct
- Gozo boat
- Gozo Channel Line
- Gozo Farmhouse
- Grand Harbour of Malta tornado
- Grandmaster's Palace (Valletta)
- Great Siege of Malta
- Great Siege of Malta in literature and historical fiction
- Greece-Malta relations
- Greeks Gate
- Greeks in Malta
- Gudja
- Gwardamanġa
- Gżira

== Għ ==
- Għajn Ħadid Tower
- Għajn Tuffieħa
- Għajn Tuffieħa Tower
- Għajn Żnuber Tower
- Għajnsielem
- Għallis Battery
- Għallis Tower
- Għar Dalam
- Għar Dalam phase
- Għar ix-Xiħ
- Għar Lapsi
- Għarb
- Għargħar Battery
- Għargħur
- Għargħur Semaphore Tower
- Għasri
- Għaxaq
- Għaxaq Semaphore Tower

== H ==
- Halfpenny Yellow
- Handball Malta
- Hastings Gardens
- Hay Wharf
- Health in Malta
- Healthcare in Malta
- Heritage Malta
- Hibernians Stadium
- The Highway Code (Malta)
- Hippopotamus melitensis
- History of banking in Malta
- History of Malta
  - Timeline of Maltese history
- History of Malta under the Order of Saint John
- History of religion in Malta
- History of the Maltese in Gibraltar
- Hompesch Gate
- Hompesch Hunting Lodge
- Hooligan (rapper)
- Hostel de Verdelin
- Hotel Phoenicia
- House of Representatives of Malta
- HSBC Bank Malta
- Human rights in Malta
- Human trafficking in Malta
- Hypogeum of Ħal-Saflieni

== Ħ ==
- Ħaġar Qim
- Ħajt il-Wied
- Ħal Far
- Ħamrija Tower
- Ħamrun
- Ħondoq ir-Rummien

== I ==
- Iklin
- Il-Helsien
- Illegal immigration in Malta
- Imtarfa
- In a Woman's Heart
- Independence Day (Malta)
- India–Malta relations
- In-Nazzjon
- Industrial Estates in Malta
- Inquisitor's Palace
- Internet in Malta
- Intersex rights in Malta
- Invasion of Gozo (1551)
- Is-Simar Nature Reserve
- Islam in Malta
- Island country
- Isle of MTV
- ISO 3166-2:MT
- Italian Maltese
- Italy–Malta relations
- Italian irredentism in Malta

== J ==
- Japan–Malta relations
- JB Catalogue
- Jerma Palace Hotel
- Jesuit Hill Battery
- Judiciary of Malta
- Julie and Ludwig

== K ==
- Kalkara
- Kaw kaw
- Karin Grech Garden
- Keep Me in Mind (Mike Spiteri song)
- Kerċem
- Kinnie
- Kirkop
- Knights Templar (Freemasonry)
- Kolonna Eterna
- Kont Diġa
- Kordin Temples
- Krest
- Kullħadd

== L ==
- L-Għanja tal-Poplu
- L-imħabba
- L-Orizzont
- Labour Youth Forum
- La Borsa
- Languages of Malta
- Lascaris Battery
- Lascaris towers
- Law enforcement in Malta
- Law of Malta
- Lazzaretto of Manoel Island
- Le Meridien St. Julians Hotel & Spa
- Leader of the Opposition (Malta)
- Legal procurator
- Lembi Battery
- Lent in Malta
- Let Me Fly (Debbie Scerri song)
- LGBT rights in Malta
- Libya–Malta relations
- Liceo Vassalli Junior Lyceum
- Lija
- Lija Belvedere Tower
- Lippija Tower
- Little Child (Mary Spiteri song)
- Local councils of Malta
- Lombard Bank
- Lower Barrakka Gardens
- Luqa
- Luzzu

== M ==
- M-Towers
- Madliena
- Madliena Tower
- Magħtab
- Magic Malta
- Maħsel Battery
- Main Guard (Valletta)
- Majmuna Stone
- Malta (island)
- Malta Air Charter
- Malta at the Olympics
- Malta at the Paralympics
- Malta at War Museum
- Malta Aviation Museum
- Malta bus
- Malta Convoys
- Malta Cricket Association
- Malta Davis Cup team
- Malta Dockyard
- Malta Enterprise
- Malta Escarpment
- Malta Environment and Planning Authority
- Malta Fairs & Conventions Centre
- Malta Fed Cup team
- Malta Football Association
- Malta Freeport
- Malta George Cross Memorial
- Malta Hotels and Restaurants Association
- Malta in the Eurovision Song Contest
- The Malta Independent
- Malta Independent School District
- Malta International Airport
- Malta International Airshow
- Malta Internet Exchange
- Malta Library and Information Association
- Malta lunar sample displays
- Malta Majjistral
- Malta Maritime Authority
- Malta Maritime Museum
- Malta Memorial
- Malta Music Awards
- Malta national baseball team
- Malta national basketball team
  - Malta women's national basketball team
- Malta national cricket team
- Malta national football team
  - Malta national under-21 football team
  - Malta national under-19 football team
  - Malta national under-17 football team
  - Malta women's national football team
- Malta men's national handball team
- Malta national rugby league team
- Malta national rugby union team
- Malta men's national water polo team
- Malta Open
- Malta–Pakistan relations
- Malta Philharmonic Orchestra
- Malta–Portugal relations
- MaltaPost
- Malta Postal Museum
- Malta Protectorate
- Malta Railway
- Malta–Russia relations
- Malta Saint Paul 10s black
- Malta–Sicily interconnector
- Malta–Slovakia relations
- Malta–Spain relations
- Malta Song for Europe
- Malta Standards Authority
- Malta Stock Exchange
- Malta Today
- Malta–Turkey relations
- Malta–Ukraine relations
- Malta–United Kingdom relations
- Malta–United States relations
- Malta Workers Party
- Malta Workers' Union
- Malta Xlokk
- Malta Youth Football Association
- Maltenglish
- Maltese Baroque architecture
- Maltese Braille
- Maltese bread
- Maltese Calypso
- 2010 Maltese Committees for Communities election
- 1964 Maltese constitutional referendum
- 1870 Maltese Council of Government referendum
- Maltese cross
- Maltese cuisine
- 2011 Maltese divorce referendum
- Maltese euro coins
- 2003 Maltese European Union membership referendum
- Maltese FA Trophy
- Maltese folklore
- 1849 Maltese general election
- 1854 Maltese general election
- 1860 Maltese general election
- 1865 Maltese general election
- 1870 Maltese general election
- 1875 Maltese general election
- 1880 Maltese general election
- 1883 Maltese general election
- 1888 Maltese general election
- 1889 Maltese general election
- 1892 Maltese general election
- 1895 Maltese general election
- 1898 Maltese general election
- 1899 Maltese general election
- 1900 Maltese general election
- January 1904 Maltese general election
- February 1904 Maltese general election
- April 1904 Maltese general election
- 1907 Maltese general election
- 1909 Maltese general election
- 1911 Maltese general election
- 1912 Maltese general election
- 1913 Maltese general election
- 1915 Maltese general election
- 1917 Maltese general election
- 1921 Maltese general election
- 1924 Maltese general election
- 1927 Maltese general election
- 1932 Maltese general election
- 1939 Maltese general election
- 1945 Maltese general election
- 1947 Maltese general election
- 1950 Maltese general election
- 1951 Maltese general election
- 1953 Maltese general election
- 1955 Maltese general election
- 1962 Maltese general election
- 1966 Maltese general election
- 1971 Maltese general election
- 1976 Maltese general election
- 1981 Maltese general election
- 1987 Maltese general election
- 1992 Maltese general election
- 1996 Maltese general election
- 1998 Maltese general election
- 2003 Maltese general election
- 2008 Maltese general election
- 2013 Maltese general election
- Maltese heraldry
- Maltese identity card
- Maltese International Trade Fair Grounds
- Maltese lace
- Maltese language
- Maltese lira
- Maltese literature
- 2005 Maltese local council elections
- 2006 Maltese local council elections
- 2007 Maltese local council elections
- 2008 Maltese local council elections
- 2009 Maltese local council elections
- 2012 Maltese local council elections
- 2015 Maltese local council elections
- Maltese mythology
- Maltese nationality law
- Maltese passport
- Maltese pataca
- Maltese patrol boat P29
- Maltese patrol boat P31
- Maltese people
- Maltese people in the United Kingdom
- 2009 Maltese presidential election
- Maltese scudo
- 2015 Maltese spring hunting referendum
- Maltese Super Cup
- 1956 Maltese United Kingdom integration referendum
- Maltese units of measurement
- Mamo Tower
- Manderaggio
- Manoel Island
- Manoel Theatre
- Mariam Al-Batool Mosque
- Maritime Squadron of the Armed Forces of Malta
- Marsa, Malta
- Marsa Battery
- Marsalforn
- Marsalforn Tower
- Marsamxett Harbour
- Marsaskala
- Marsaxlokk
- Marsaxlokk Ground
- Massa Frumentaria
- Matriculation Certificate (Malta)
- Mdina
- Mdina Gate
- Medal of Merit (Malta)
- Medavia
- Mediterranean Sea
- Mediterranean States
- Megalithic Temples of Malta
- Melita (personification)
- Melite (ancient city)
- Mellieħa
- Mellieħa Redoubt
- Arturo Mercieca
- Merkanti Reef
- Mġarr
- Mġarr, Gozo
- Mġarr ix-Xini
- Mġarr ix-Xini Tower
- Mġarr phase
- Ministry for Foreign Affairs (Malta)
- Miss World Malta
- Mistra Battery
- Mistra Gate
- Enrico Mizzi
- Fortunato Mizzi
- Mnajdra
- Monte della Redenzione degli Schiavi
- Monte di Pietà (Malta)
- More than Love (Scicluna and Stafrace song)
- Mosta
- Mosta Ground
- Moviment Graffitti
- Mqabba
- Mselliet
- Msida
- Munxar
- Murder of Karin Grech
- Music of Malta
- My Dream (Thea Garrett song)

== N ==
- Nadur
- Nadur Tower
- National Congress Battalions
- National Archives of Malta
- National Council for the Maltese Language
- National Inventory of the Cultural Property of the Maltese Islands
- National Library of Malta
- National Museum of Archaeology, Malta
- National Museum of Fine Arts, Malta
- National Museum of Natural History, Malta
- National Order of Merit (Malta)
- National symbols of Malta
- National War Museum (Malta)
- Nationalist Party (Malta)
- Navy of the Order of Saint John
- Naxxar
- Naxxar Entrenchment
- NET Television (Malta)
- Nibbia Chapel
- Ninu's Cave
- Northern Region, Malta
- Not My Soul

== O ==
- One (Maltese TV channel)
- One Productions Ltd
- One Radio
- Operation Herkules
- Operation Pedestal
- Order of Malta Ambulance Corps
- Orders, decorations, and medals of Malta
- Orders, decorations, and medals of the Sovereign Military Order of Malta
- Our Lady of Victories Church, Valletta
- Our Lady of Victories Parish Church

== P ==
- Paceville
- Palace Armoury
- Palazzo Capua
- Palazzo Correa
- Palazzo Dorell
- Palazzo Falson
- Palazzo Ferreria
- Palazzo Fremaux
- Palazzo Malta
- Palazzo Nasciaro
- Palazzo Parisio (Naxxar)
- Palazzo Parisio (Valletta)
- Palazzo Pescatore
- Palazzo Santa Sofia
- Palazzo Vilhena
- Paola, Malta
- Parish Church of St Mary, Attard
- Parish Church of St Mary, Birkirkara
- Parliament of Malta
- Parliament House (Malta)
- Pembroke, Malta
- Pembroke Battery
- Pendergardens
- Perellos Redoubt
- Pietà, Malta
- Pinto Battery
- Pinto's Loggia
- Playmobil Park
- Politics of Malta
- Ponsonby's Column
- Porte des Bombes
- Portomaso Business Tower
- Postage stamps and postal history of Malta
- President of Malta
- Public Broadcasting Services
- Public holidays in Malta
- Punic-Roman towers in Malta
- Pwales

== Q ==
- Qala, Malta
- Qalet Marku Battery
- Qalet Marku Redoubt
- Qawra
- Qawra Tower
- Qolla l-Bajda Battery
- Qormi
- Qortin Redoubt
- Qrendi
- Queen of Malta

== R ==
- Rabat
- Rabat Ajax Football Ground
- Radio 101 (Malta)
- Radio Malta
- Radio Maria
- Radju Lauretana
- Radju Malta 2
- Raid of Żejtun
- Ramla Bay
- Ramla Left Battery
- Ramla Redoubt
- Ramla Right Battery
- Ras il-Wardija
- Martin de Redin
- Regions of Malta
- Religion in Malta
- Republic Square, Valletta
- Republic Street, Valletta
- Retreat houses in Malta
- Revenue stamps of Malta
- Riħama Battery
- Rising of the Priests
- Roads in Malta
- Roman Catholic Archdiocese of Malta
- Rotunda of Mosta
- MV Rozi
- Royal Naval Hospital, Bighi
- Royal Naval Hospital, Mtarfa
- Royal Malta Artillery
- Royal Malta Yacht Club
- Royal Naval School Tal-Handaq
- Royal Opera House, Valletta

== S ==
- Sacred Heart of Jesus Church, Fontana
- Safi, Malta
- Saflieni phase
- Sagħtar
- Saint Andrew's
- St. Michael School (Malta)
- Saint Agatha's Tower
- Saint Anthony's Battery
- Saint Augustine's College
- Saint Edward's College
- Saint Francis of Assisi Church
- Saint George's Basilica
- Saint George Redoubt
- Saint George's Tower
- Saint Helen's Basilica
- Saint James Cavalier
- Saint John's Cavalier
- Saint Julian's
- Saint Julian's Tower
- Saint Lawrence
- Saint Luke's Hospital
- Saint Mark's Tower
- Saint Martin's College Sixth Form
- Saint Mary Magdalene Chapel, Dingli
- Saint Mary's Battery
- Saint Mary's Battery (Marsalforn)
- Saint Mary's Redoubt
- Saint Mary's Tower
- Saint Michael School
- Saint Paul's Battery
- Saint Paul's Bay
- Saint Paul's Missionary College
- Saint Peter's Battery
- Saint Publius Parish Church
- Saint Thomas Tower
- Salina, Malta
- Saluting Battery (Valletta)
- Same-sex marriage in Malta
- San Andrea School
- San Anton School
- San Ġwann
- San Rocco Battery
- San Rocco Redoubt
- Sanctuary of Our Lady of Mellieħa
- Sannat
- Santa Cecilia Chapel
- Santa Cecilia Tower
- Santa Luċija
- Santa Margerita Chapel
- Santa Margherita Lines
- Santa Maria delle Grazie Tower
- Santa Venera
- Santa Verna
- Debbie Scerri
- Sciuta Tower
- The Scout Association of Malta
- Scouting and Guiding in Malta
- Selmun Palace
- Senate of Malta
- Senglea
- Siege of Malta (1429)
- Siege of Malta (1798–1800)
- Siege of Malta (World War II)
- Siege of Medina (1053–54)
- Siege of Melite (870)
- Siġġiewi
- Is-Simar Nature Reserve
- Sine Macula Choir
- Singing This Song
- Skorba Temples
- Slaves' Prison
- Sliema
- Sliema Batteries
- Sliema Point Battery
- SmartCity Malta
- Smash Television
- Society of Christian Doctrine
- Sopu Tower
- South Eastern Region
- Southern Region, Malta
- Sovereign Military Order of Malta
- Sovereign Military Order of Malta passport
- Spencer Monument
- Spinola Battery
- Spinola Palace (St. Julian's)
- Spinola Palace (Valletta)
- Spinola Redoubt
- State of Malta
- Swatar
- Swieqi
- Symbols of Malta

== T ==
- Ta' Ċieda Tower
- Ta' Cisju Farmhouse
- Ta' Dmejrek
- Ta' Ġiorni
- Ta' Għemmuna Battery
- Ta' Ħaġrat Temples
- Ta' Kandja
- Ta' Kenuna Tower
- Ta' Tabibu farmhouse
- Ta' Xbiex
- Ta' Xindi Farmhouse
- Tal-Bir Redoubt
- Tal-Borg Battery
- Tal-Għoqod
- Tal-Ħandaq
- Tal-Qadi Temple
- Tal-Wejter Tower
- Ta' Xindi Farmhouse
- Tarġa Battery
- Tarxien
- Tarxien Cemetery phase
- Tarxien phase
- Tarxien Temples
- Tas-Samra Battery
- Tas-Silġ
- Taxation in Malta
- Telecommunications in Malta
- Telephone numbers in Malta
- Television in Malta
- Temple of Apollo (Melite)
- Temple of Proserpina
- Territorial possessions of the Sovereign Military Order of Malta
- The Devil's Farmhouse
- The Malta Independent
- This Time (William Mangion song)
- Three Cities
- Three villages of Malta
- Time in Malta
- Timeline of Maltese history
- Times of Malta
- To Dream Again
- Tombrell Battery
- Tombs of Malta
- Torre dello Standardo
- Tourism in Malta
- Transport in Malta
- Triq il-Wiesgħa Tower
- Triton Fountain (Malta)
- TVM (Malta)

== U ==
- Um El Faroud
- University of Malta
- Upper Barrakka Gardens

== V ==
- Valletta
- Valletta Living History
- Valletta Market
- Valletta Summit on Migration
- Valletta Waterfront
- Vehicle registration plates of Malta
- Vendôme Battery
- Vendôme Tower
- Verdala Palace
- Victoria, Gozo
- Victoria Gate (Valletta)
- Victoria Lines
- Victory Day (Malta)
- Villa Bologna
- Villa Bonici
- Villa Francia
- Villa Guardamangia
- Villa Lauri
- Villa Parisio
- Vincenti Tower
- Visa requirements for holders of passports issued by the Sovereign Military Order of Malta
- Visa requirements for Maltese citizens

== W ==
- Walter Micallef u l-Ħbieb
- War Memorial (Floriana)
- Wardija
- Wardija Battery
- Wardija Tower
- The Westin Dragonara
- Westreme Battery
- What If We (song)
- Wied il-Għasel
- Wied Musa Battery
- Wignacourt Aqueduct
- Wignacourt Arch
- Wignacourt Museum
- Wignacourt Tower
- Wignacourt towers
- Wilġa Battery
- Wind power in Malta
- Windmill Redoubt
- Wolseley Battery

== X ==
- Xagħra
- Xagħra Stone Circle
- Xarabank
- Xarolla Windmill
- Xerri's Grotto
- Xewkija
- XFM Malta
- Xgħajra
- Ximenes Redoubt
- Xlejli Tower
- Xlendi
- Xlendi Tower
- Xrobb l-Għaġin Temple
- Xrobb l-Għaġin Tower
- Xwejni Redoubt

== Y ==
- Youth Travel Circle

== Ż ==
- Żabbar
- Żabbar Batteries and Redoubt
- Żabbar St. Patrick F.C.
- Żabbar Sanctuary Museum
- Żaqq
- Żebbuġ
- Żebbuġ, Gozo
- Żejtun
- Żejtun Batteries
- Żejtun Roman villa
- Żgħażagħ Azzjoni Kattolika
- Żonqor Battery
- Żonqor Tower
- Żurrieq
- Żurrieq F.C.
- Żurrieq Half Marathon

== Z ==
- Zammitello Palace
- Francesco Zerafa

== Lists ==
- List of airports in Malta
- List of banks in Malta
- List of cathedrals in Malta
- List of churches in Malta
- List of cities in Malta
- List of civil commissioners of Malta
- List of companies of Malta
- List of deputy prime ministers of Malta
- Designers of Maltese stamps
- List of diplomatic missions of Malta
- List of films set in Malta
- List of films shot in Malta
- List of finance ministers of Malta
- List of fish on stamps of Malta
- List of flag bearers for Malta at the Olympics
- List of flags of Malta
- List of football stadiums in Malta
- List of fortifications of Malta
- List of governors of Malta
- List of heads of state of Malta
- List of hotels in Malta
- List of Leaders of the Opposition of Malta
- List of Lepidoptera of Malta
- List of lighthouses in Malta
- List of localities in Malta
- List of Maltese artists
- List of Maltese governments
- List of Maltese-language poets
- List of Maltese people
- List of mayors of places in Malta
- List of members of the European Parliament for Malta, 2004–09
- List of members of the European Parliament for Malta, 2009–14
- List of members of the parliament of Malta, 2008–13
- List of members of the parliament of Malta, 2013–
- List of ministers for foreign affairs of Malta
- List of monarchs of Malta
- List of monuments in Malta
- List of monuments in Rabat, Malta
- List of museums in Malta
- List of newspapers in Malta
- List of observers to the European Parliament for Malta, 2003–04
- List of people on stamps of Malta
- List of political parties in Malta
- List of presidents of Malta
- List of prime ministers of Malta
- List of Princes and Grand Masters of the Sovereign Military Order of Malta
- List of public libraries in Malta
- List of radio stations in Malta
- List of schools in Malta
- List of shopping malls in Malta
- List of speakers of the House of Representatives of Malta
- List of squares in Malta
- List of tallest buildings in Malta
- List of television stations in Malta
- List of towns in Malta and Gozo
- List of twin towns and sister cities in Malta
- List of valleys of Malta
- List of wars involving Malta
- List of windmills in Malta
- List of World Heritage Sites in Malta

== See also ==
- Lists of country-related topics - similar lists for other countries
