= Central Radio =

Central Radio or Central FM may refer to:

- Central Radio (Lancashire), a commercial DAB radio station in Lancashire, England
- Central FM (Stirling), a radio station serving Falkirk, Stirling and Clackmannanshire, Scotland
- 93.3 Central FM, a former radio station based in Malta
- Central FM (Spanish radio station), an English radio station broadcasting in Southern Spain
