= Kullhad =

Kullhad may refer to:

- Kulhar, traditional terracotta from India and Pakistan
- Kullħadd, newspaper from Malta
