= Il-Helsien =

Former newspaper in Malta

Il-Helsien was a newspaper in Malta, published by the Malta Labour Party. Il-Helsien was a daily paper, later becoming a weekly (issued on Fridays). Il-Helsien was replaced by Kullħadd, also a weekly paper.
