= Visa requirements for holders of passports issued by the Sovereign Military Order of Malta =

Administrative entry restrictions

As of 2017, about 500 Sovereign Military Order of Malta passports are in circulation.

== Visa requirements map ==
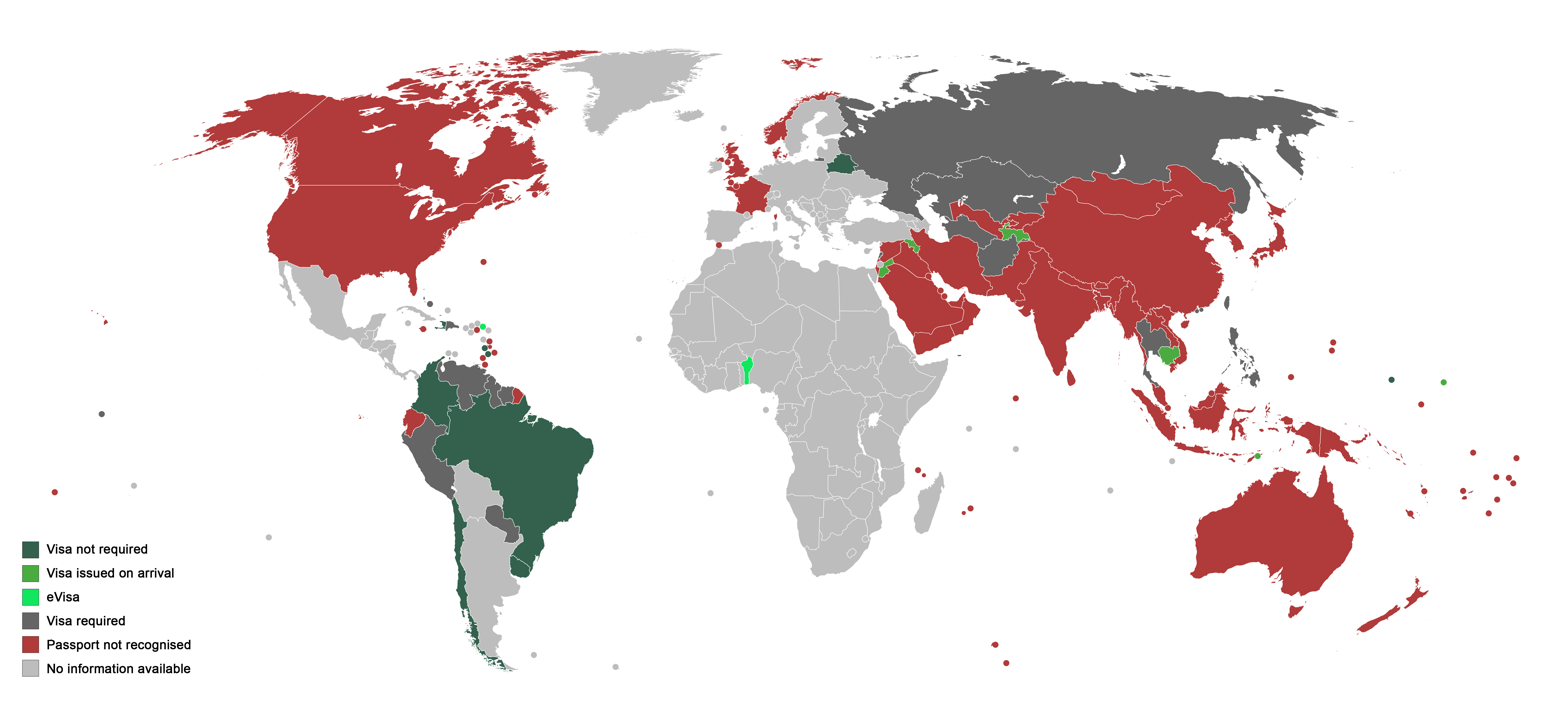
Map of visa requirements for holders of passports issued by the Sovereign Military Order of Malta. Visa not required Visa issued upon arrival eVisa Visa required prior to arrival Passport not recognised No information available

== Visa requirements information and notes ==
Country	Visa requirement	Allowed stay	Notes
Afghanistan	Visa required		
Albania	N/A		
Algeria	N/A		
Andorra	N/A		
Angola	N/A		
Antigua and Barbuda	eVisa		
Argentina	Visa not required		Passport recognized.; Entry tax: 10 US dollars (if entering by airport); Departure taxes: 18 US dollars as Airport Tax Or 8 US dollars on flights to Uruguay.
Armenia	N/A		
Australia and territories	passport not recognized		
Austria	N/A		
Azerbaijan	N/A		
Bahamas	Visa required		Entry fee (sea): 150/300 US dollars; Departure fee (air): 25 US dollars (or 28 US dollars, if exiting from Freeport); Departure fee (sea): 15 US dollars (or 13 US dollars for stayings under 24 hours).
Bahrain	passport not recognized		
Bangladesh	passport not recognized		
Barbados	passport not recognized		
Belarus	Visa required		Visa-free for up to 10 days in Brest and Grodno regions.
Belgium	N/A		
Belize	N/A		
Benin	eVisa	30 days	
Bhutan	passport not recognized		
Bolivia	—N/a		Passport recognized; Departure tax: 24 US dollars (if exiting by airport)
Bosnia and Herzegovina	N/A		
Botswana	N/A		
Brazil	Visa not required	90 days	Departure tax: 36 US dollars (if exiting by airport); No crossing points with Suriname.
Brunei	passport not recognized		
Bulgaria	N/A		
Burkina Faso	N/A		
Burundi	N/A		
Cambodia	Visa on arrival	30 days	
Cameroon	N/A		
Canada	passport not recognized		
Cape Verde	N/A		
Central African Republic	N/A		
Chad	N/A		
Chile	Visa not required	90 days	
China	passport not recognized		
Colombia	Visa not required	90 days	Extendable up to 180-days stay within a one-year period; 30-day extension costs 25 US dollars.; Maximum time is decided by customs officials on spot.; Departure tax: 33 US dollars if exiting by airport.; No land crossing points with Panama.
Comoros	N/A		
Republic of the Congo	N/A		
Democratic Republic of the Congo	N/A		
Costa Rica	N/A		
Côte d'Ivoire	N/A		
Croatia	N/A		
Cuba	—N/a		Passport recognized
Cyprus	N/A		
Czech Republic	N/A		
Denmark	passport not recognized		
Djibouti	N/A		
Dominica	passport not recognized		
Dominican Republic	Visa required		
Ecuador	passport not recognized		
Egypt	N/A		
El Salvador	N/A		
Equatorial Guinea	N/A		
Eritrea	N/A		
Estonia	N/A		
Eswatini	N/A		
Ethiopia	N/A		
Fiji	passport not recognized		
Finland	N/A		
France and territories	passport not recognized		
Gabon	N/A		
Gambia	N/A		
Georgia	N/A		
Germany	Visa not required	90 days	Passport recognised
Ghana	N/A		
Greece	N/A		
Grenada	passport not recognized		
Guatemala	N/A		
Guinea	N/A		
Guinea-Bissau	N/A		
Guyana	Visa required		Visa tee: 30 days for 25 US dollars); Extension of stay also costs 25 US dollars for 30 days.; Maximum 2 extensions allowed.; Departure tax: 2.500 Guyanese dollars as Travel tax + 1.500 Guyanese dollars as Airport security fee (if leaving by airport).; Border with Venezuela is closed
Haiti	Visa not required	90 days	
Honduras	N/A		
Hungary	N/A		
Iceland	N/A		
India	passport not recognized		
Indonesia	passport not recognized		
Iran	passport not recognized		
Iraq	passport not recognized		
Ireland	N/A		
Israel	passport not recognized		
Italy	Visa not required	Permanent	Rome is the de facto capital of SMOM
Jamaica	passport not recognized		
Japan	passport not recognized		
Jordan	Visa on arrival	1 month	Visa on arrival for free if entering by Aqaba or registering in Aqaba in 48 hours, or 20 Jordanian dinars if entering elsewhere; No crossing points with UNDOF Zone departure fee: 8 Jordanian dinars/passenger + 5 Jordanian dinars/vehicle (if exiting by land or sea); airport tax of 30 Jordanian dinars (if leaving by air)
Kazakhstan	Visa required		Visiting regions close to the Chinese border requires special permit.
Kenya	N/A		
Kiribati	Visa required		
North Korea	passport not recognized		
South Korea	passport not recognized		
Kuwait	passport not recognized		
Kyrgyzstan	passport not recognized		
Laos	passport not recognized		
Latvia	N/A		
Lebanon	Visa required		
Lesotho	N/A		
Liberia	N/A		
Libya	N/A		
Liechtenstein	N/A		
Lithuania	N/A		
Luxembourg	N/A		
Madagascar	N/A		
Malawi	N/A		
Malaysia	passport not recognized		
Maldives	passport not recognized		
Mali	N/A		
Malta	N/A		
Marshall Islands	Visa on arrival	90 days	
Mauritania	N/A		
Mauritius	N/A		
Mexico	passport not recognized		
Micronesia	Visa not required	30 days	Departure fees of US$10 (Pohnpei and Kosrae) or US$15 (Chuuk); no departure fee for Yap
Moldova	N/A		
Monaco	N/A		
Mongolia	passport not recognized		
Montenegro	N/A		
Morocco	N/A		
Mozambique	N/A		
Myanmar	passport not recognized		
Namibia	N/A		
Nauru	passport not recognized		
Nepal	passport not recognized		
Netherlands	N/A		
New Zealand	passport not recognized		
Nicaragua	N/A		
Niger	N/A		
Nigeria	N/A		
North Macedonia	N/A		
Norway	passport not recognized		
Oman	passport not recognized		
Pakistan	passport not recognized		
Palau	passport not recognized		
Panama	N/A		
Papua New Guinea	passport not recognized		
Paraguay	Visa required		Departure tax: 25 US dollars (if exiting by airport); 25 US dollars on Silvio Pettirossi International Airport or 10 US dollars on Guaraní International Airport.
Peru	Visa required		Entry tax: 15 US dollars (if entering by airport); Departure tax: 30,25 US dollars (if exiting by airport)
Philippines	Visa required		
Poland	N/A		
Portugal	N/A		
Qatar	passport not recognized		
Romania	N/A		
Russia	Visa required		Passport recognized.; Visa required for all types of passports.
Rwanda	N/A		
Saint Kitts and Nevis	passport not recognized		
Saint Lucia	Visa not required		
Saint Vincent and the Grenadines	Visa not required	4 weeks	Departure fee: 40 East Caribbean dollars (for stayings of minimum 24 hours)
Samoa	passport not recognized		
San Marino	Visa not required		Open borders with Italy
São Tomé and Príncipe	N/A		
Saudi Arabia	passport not recognized		
Senegal	N/A		
Serbia	N/A		
Seychelles	N/A		
Sierra Leone	N/A		
Singapore	passport not recognized		
Slovakia	N/A		
Slovenia	Visa not required		
Solomon Islands	passport not recognized		
Somalia	N/A		
South Africa	N/A		
South Sudan	N/A		
Spain	N/A		
Sri Lanka	passport not recognized		
Sudan	N/A		
Suriname	Visa required		Visa fee: 15 days/2/3/6/12 months for 15/45/90/135/210 US dollars); The Transit visa for 15 days is single entry. The others are multi-entry.; Departure tax: 66 US dollars/52 euro (if exiting by airport); Only payable in US dollars or euro. Surinamese dollars are not accepted.; No crossing points with Brazil.
Sweden	N/A		
Switzerland	N/A		
Syria	passport not recognized		
Tajikistan	Visa on arrival		On Dushanbe airport for 45/55/65 US dollars
Tanzania	N/A		
Thailand	Visa required		
Timor-Leste	Visa on arrival	30 days	
Togo	N/A		
Tonga	passport not recognized		
Trinidad and Tobago	passport not recognized		
Tunisia	N/A		
Turkey	N/A		
Turkmenistan	Visa required		
Tuvalu	passport not recognized		
Uganda	N/A		
Ukraine	N/A		
United Arab Emirates	passport not recognized		
United Kingdom and Crown dependencies	passport not recognized		
United States	passport not recognized		
Uruguay	Visa not required	90 days	
Uzbekistan	passport not recognized		
Vanuatu	passport not recognized		
Vatican City	Visa not required		Open borders with Italy
Venezuela	Visa required		Departure tax: 110 Bolivares fuertes as governmental exit tax + 137,50 Bolivares fuertes as airport tax (if exiting by airport).; Border with Guyana is closed.
Vietnam	passport not recognized		
Yemen	passport not recognized		
Zambia	N/A		
Zimbabwe	N/A		

Territories

- Argentine Antarctica – Special permits required.
- (Antártica Chilena Province) Chilean Antarctic Territory – Special permits required.
- Hong Kong – Visa required.
- (Kurdistan Region) Iraqi Kurdistan – Visa on arrival for 10 days for free.
- Macau – Visa required.
- Palestine – Unknown passport recognition.
- Republic of China (Taiwan) – Visa required
- Cook Islands – Passport not recognized by New Zealand.
- Niue – Passport not recognized by New Zealand.
- Tokelau – Passport not recognized by New Zealand.
- American Samoa – Passport not recognized by the United States.
- Guam – Passport not recognized by the United States.
- Northern Mariana Islands – Passport not recognized by the United States.

== See also ==
- Sovereign Military Order of Malta passport
