= 1909 Maltese general election =

General elections were held in Malta on 11 and 12 October 1909. For the first time since 1895, all seats were contested.

== Background ==
The elections were held under the Chamberlain Constitution, with members elected from eight single-member constituencies.

District	Towns
I	Valletta East
II	Valletta West, Msida, Sliema, St. Julian's
III	Floriana, Pietà, Ħamrun, Qormi, Żebbuġ
IV	Cospicua, Birgu, Kalkara, Żabbar, Marsaskala
V	Senglea, New Village, Luqa, Gudja, Għaxaq, Żejtun, Marsaxlokk, Saint George's Bay and Birżebbuġa
VI	Birkirkara, Balzan, Lija, Attard, Għargħur, Naxxar, Mosta, Mellieħa
VII	Mdina, Rabat, Siġġiewi, Dingli, Qrendi, Mqabba, Żurrieq, Bubaqra, Safi, Kirkop
VIII	Gozo and Comino
Source: Schiavone, p17

== Results ==
A total of 7,377 people were registered to vote, with 3,354 votes cast, giving a turnout of 46%.

Constituency	Name	Votes	Notes
I	Andrè Pullicino	257	Re-elected
II	Emmanuele Said	291	
III	Francesco Azzopardi	316	Re-elected
IV	Beniamino Bonnici	289	Re-elected
V	Salvatore Cachia Zammit	254	Re-elected
VI	Alfredo Mattei	255	
VII	A Caruana Gatto	308	Re-elected
VIII	Artuto Mercieca	355	
Source: Schiavone, pp181–182
