= Human trafficking in Malta =

Malta ratified the 2000 UN TIP Protocol in September 2003.

In 2010, Malta was a destination country for European women subjected to trafficking in persons, specifically forced prostitution. During this reporting period and in the past, the Maltese media also covered possible cases of Maltese teenage girls who may have been involved in forced prostitution in Malta. Malta was likely a destination country for men subjected to forced labor, as reflected by a report in 2009 that three Pakistani males were forced to work in Pakistani restaurants in Malta. The dozens of children and 4,304 total irregular migrants currently residing in Malta from African countries may have been vulnerable to human trafficking in Malta's “grey” informal labor market.

The Government of Malta does not fully comply with the minimum standards for the elimination of trafficking; however, it is making significant efforts to do so. Despite these efforts, the government did not demonstrate progress in convicting and punishing trafficking offenders, or in identifying and ensuring the protection of trafficking victims during the reporting period.

The U.S. State Department's Office to Monitor and Combat Trafficking in Persons placed the country in "Tier 2" in 2017 and 2023.

From 2017 to 2020, the country identified 44 victims of the crime.

== General Information ==
The government of Malta has attempted to combat human trafficking through several initiatives, including the development of victim assistance services, training of government officials, and raising of public awareness.

Malta has experienced a limited number of cases of human trafficking, all of which involved the sexual exploitation of women. The victims were mainly third-country nationals from Eastern Europe, including in particular Russia and Ukraine, who had entered Malta through legal channels. Only one case involved the sexual exploitation of an EU national. The cases encountered so far did not involve organized crime networks.

No new cases of human trafficking were encountered during 2009 and 2010, although a new case has been brought before the Courts this year.

In view of the limited number of cases encountered so far, particularly during the last three years, it is difficult to extrapolate any particular trends.

One new TIP case was registered in Malta in 2011. 4 persons were accused, 2 Maltese nationals and another 2 from Romania. There were 3 identified victims from Romania who were recruited while they were on holiday in Greece. This case follows previous registered trends experienced in Malta, which is trafficking for the purposes of sexual exploitation.

The United States TIP report published in June 2012 rated Malta in Tier 2, up from the Tier 2 (Watch list) rating of the previous reports. Whilst making recommendations in relation to further actions, the report also notes that significant progress has been registered by the Maltese authorities in the sphere of human trafficking.

Since February 2012, 2 cases of human trafficking were encountered.

One case involved trafficking for labor and sexual exploitation. It concerned Chinese nationals working in a massage parlor and in a restaurant and resulted in the identification of 3 victims, 2 males and 1 female. All victims were being employed irregularly and under poor working conditions. The female was also being asked to provide sexual services to clients. This case was discovered during ad hoc inspection by the Police unit responsible for prostitution and trafficking. The alleged perpetrator is a Chinese national.

The other case was of a Filipino young woman who was being employed by a foreign family in Malta. The victim communicated with an NGO through her laptop, in which the social welfare agency was alerted and the victim was helped to flee the house. The victim has a valid passport and visa therefore she can stay in the country. So far, the victim has not yet taken a decision to take the case further to the police and thus report her employers.

In terms of new cases of THB, 1 new case was encountered by the police and brought before the court in February 2013 for charges of human trafficking. This is being considered as an internal trafficking case, since the perpetrator and the victim are both Maltese Nationals. It is the first case of its kind in Malta.

In 2025, Malta authorities reported the identification of 36 potential trafficking victims in 2024, including 20 exploited for sex, 12 for labor, 2 for both, and 2 for unspecified exploitation, with 10 formally recognized as victims.

== Prosecution (2010) ==
The Government of Malta demonstrated minimal progress in its efforts to prosecute trafficking in persons offenses and punish trafficking offenders during the reporting period. Malta's criminal code prohibits trafficking for commercial sexual exploitation and labor exploitation and prescribes punishments of two to nine years’ imprisonment. These prescribed penalties are sufficiently stringent and commensurate with punishments prescribed for other serious crimes, such as rape. The government did not convict and punish any alleged trafficking offenders during the reporting period. Several ongoing court cases cited in the 2008 and 2009 Reports remained unresolved: the case of a police officer convicted in 2005 who remained out of jail pending an appeal; the Maltese nationals arrested for the trafficking of eight Russian and Ukrainian women; the four people prosecuted for allegedly trafficking a Romanian woman in 2004; and the 2008 case in which three men were arrested for trafficking a Swedish woman. The Police Commissioner in January 2010 directed his subordinate staff - who are responsible for criminal prosecution as well as investigation - to expedite and conclude current and future trafficking cases within 90 days from date of arraignment. There was one new human trafficking prosecution initiated during the reporting period. The government did not sponsor any new trafficking-specific training for police, prosecutors or judges during the reporting period, though it did provide such training for border officials.

== Protection (2010) ==
The Government of Malta made no discernible progress in protecting trafficking victims during the reporting period. The absence of anti-trafficking NGOs in Malta likely contributed to challenges in victim protection as NGOs traditionally provide valuable partnership in identifying and assisting potential victims. Lack of victim identification increased the risk that victims were punished for immigration violations or other unlawful acts as a direct result of being trafficked. The government continued to lack formal procedures to guide first responders in identifying forced labor cases among vulnerable groups, such as foreign workers, and referring them to trafficking-specific services. The government did not show evidence of adequately implementing its formal system for referring all women in prostitution apprehended by police to government social workers. The government incorporated indicators for human trafficking as part of the asylum process for irregular migrants but did not have formal procedures on how to refer potential victims in migrant detention centers to trafficking-specific services. According to a 2009 UN Report, the government initially imposed detention on all irregular migrants upon arrival in Malta. While the government applied a fast-track procedure for vulnerable migrants, including pregnant women, families, and unaccompanied minors to be released from detention to open centers (where migrants are provided with housing and government-sponsored social services available to all Maltese citizens), it may still take up to three months. The government did not provide trafficking victims with shelter or services during the reporting period, nor were potential foreign labor trafficking victims offered residence permits, social, medical and legal assistance, and other potential safety and protection resources available under Maltese law prior to their return to their country of origin. The government has not developed or implemented standardized procedures for safe, voluntary repatriation for victims exploited in Malta. The government encourages trafficking victims to assist in the prosecution of their traffickers and attempted to implement creative ways of doing so; one victim in the past was allowed to provide testimony against her trafficker through video conferencing.

== Prevention (2010) ==
The Maltese government made some progress in advancing anti-trafficking prevention activities over the last year. The government's agency for social welfare, Appogg continued to produce detailed brochures to raise awareness about human trafficking, including information on identifying potential victims and outlets for victim assistance, and distributed them at health clinics, community centers, churches, and in entertainment areas to target potential clients of the sex trade. In late 2009, the government and an international cosmetics company forged a partnership whereby proceeds from products sold by the business would assist the government in developing an awareness campaign on child trafficking. Malta's government Employment and Training Corporation conducted informational sessions within migrant detention centers to inform migrants about their rights and the process by which to attain work permits and proper employment, if they are granted asylum and released. The government did not formally monitor its anti-trafficking efforts and continued to lack an anti-trafficking national action plan. The government did not report any specific measures to reduce the possible participation of Maltese nationals in child sex tourism abroad.

== See also ==
- Human rights in Malta
- Malta
- Human trafficking
- Human rights
