= Għar ix-Xiħ =

Cave in Malta

Coordinates: 36°1′21″N 14°16′9″E

Għar ix-Xiħ (English: Cave of the Old Man or Cave of the Sheikh or The headman's abode) is a former cave in Xewkija, facing Mġarr ix-Xini, Gozo, Malta. It was inhabited since the 2nd-century B.C. and was re-discovered in 2009. The cave is situated at the mouth of the valley.

The cave was long believed a legend, going back to 1583, about a popular judge who used the cave. Another nearby cave is known as il-Ħabs (The Prison).

The cave floor contained artefacts dating from Bronze Age to late Roman times. At some point the roof was removed.
