= 1880 Maltese general election =

- 13–16 October 1880

8 of the 18 seats to the Government Council
	First party
Party	Anti-Reform Party
Seats won	5

General elections were held in Malta between 13 and 16 October 1880. The majority of elected Councillors were members of the Anti-Reform Party.

== Background ==
The elections were held under the 1849 constitution, which provided for an 18-member Government Council, of which ten members would be appointed and eight elected.

== Results ==
A total of 2,400 people were registered to vote, of which 1,866 cast votes, giving a turnout of 78%.

Elected members
Name	Votes	Party	Notes
Salvatore Cachia Zammit	588	Anti-Reform Party	Re-elected
Dun Emmanuel Debono	548	Anti-Reform Party	Re-elected
Franc. DeCesare	543		
Antonio Micallef	584		
Pasquale Mifsud	607		
Fortunato Mizzi	131	Anti-Reform Party	Elected from Gozo
Agostini Naudi	909	Anti-Reform Party	Re-elected
Giovanni Sciortino	487	Anti-Reform Party	
Source: Schiavone, p177
