= 1854 Maltese general election =

- 3–11 November 1854

General elections were held in Malta between 3 and 11 November 1854.

== Background ==
The elections were held under the 1849 constitution, which provided for an 18-member Government Council, of which ten members would be appointed and eight elected.

== Results ==
A total of 4,348 people were registered to vote, of which 3,882 cast votes, giving a turnout of 89%.

Elected members
Name	Votes	Notes
Don Filippo Amato	1,266	Re-elected
Ign. Bonavita	798	
Imhallef Bruno	903	
Annetto Casolani	989	Re-elected
Salv. Naudi	1,112	
Emm. Rossignaud	589	
Paolo Sciortino	258	Elected from Gozo
Mikelang Xerro	1,555	
Source: Schiavone, p175
