= Action of 26 June 1625 =

Coordinates: 37.074°N 15.329°E

- Part of Ottoman–Habsburg wars
Date	26 June 1625
Location	off Syracuse
Result	Ottoman victory

Belligerents
(Sovereign Military Order of Malta) Order of Saint John	Ottoman Empire

Commanders and leaders
(Sovereign Military Order of Malta) Michele de Pontalier Tallamey	Unknown

Strength
5 galleys	2 galleys 4 vessels

Casualties and losses
2 galleys captured 350 killed	Unknown

The action of 26 June 1625 was a naval battle that took place on 26 June 1625 near Syracuse, Sicily, when 6 Bizertan vessels defeated 5 Maltese galleys.

On June 26th, while in harbor at Syracuse, the Maltese general, Tallamey, heard that six Bizertans had been sighted close at hand. Without waiting to embark extra troops or to make other preparations for action, he put them to sea and, to make things worse, allowed his galleys to attack the enemy one by one. In the end, after being wounded, he abandoned the battle and fled to Malta. Two other galleys escaped to Syracuse, but the ships, S. Giovanni and S. Francesco, were captured. Losses in all the galleys were severe. After this battle, the general resigned from his command

This setback prompted the Maltese Council to pass new orders concerning the number of men on board each galley and the qualifications of the captains.

== Ships involved ==
=== Bizerta ===
2 galleys (formerly Spanish, captured in 1624)
4 other vessels

=== Malta ===
San Giovanni - Captured
San Francesco - Captured
3 other galleys

== Sources ==
- Anderson, R. C. (1952). Naval Wars in the Levant 1559–1853. Princeton: Princeton University Press.
- Ayse Devrim Atauz (2008), Eight Thousand Years of Maltese Maritime History: Trade, Piracy, and Naval Warfare in the Central Mediterranean.
