= List of members of the European Parliament for Malta, 2004–2009 =

This is a list of the 5 members of the European Parliament for Malta in the 2004 to 2009 session.

== List ==
Name	National party	EP Group
John Attard Montalto	Labour Party	PES
Simon Busuttil	Nationalist Party	EPP–ED
David Casa	Nationalist Party	EPP–ED
Louis Grech	Labour Party	PES
Joseph Muscat	Labour Party	PES

=== Party representation ===
National party	EP Group	Seats	±
Labour Party	PES	3 / 5	
Nationalist Party	EPP–ED	2 / 5	
