= 1898 Maltese general election =

General elections were held in Malta on 28 and 29 September 1898.

== Background ==
The elections were held under the Knutsford Constitution. Ten members were elected from single-member constituencies, whilst a further four members were elected to represent nobility and landowners, graduates, clerics and the Chamber of Commerce.

District	Towns
I	Valletta East
II	Valletta West, Sliema, St. Julian's
III	Floriana, Pietà, Ħamrun, Msida
IV	Cospicua, Żabbar
V	Birgu, Senglea
VI	Mdina
VII	Birkirkara
VIII	Qormi
IX	Żejtun
X	Gozo
Source: Schiavone, p13

== Results ==
A total of 9,863 people were registered to vote, of which 3,128 cast votes, giving a turnout of 32%. Paolo Sammut was elected to both the nobility and landowners' seat and the seat of constituency II, whilst no candidates stood for the seats for clerics and the Chamber of Commerce. Sammut chose to retain the seat for constituency II, and by-elections were held for the three vacant seats on 2 October.

General elected members
Constituency	Name	Votes	Notes
I	C Bugeli	237	
II	Paolo Sammut	416	Re-elected (previously in constituency X)
III	Antonio Dalli	239	
IV	F Cardona	437	
V	Joseph Bencini	–	Unopposed
VI	Nutar Petro Bartoli	281	
VII	Fransesco Wettinger	169	Re-elected
VIII	Cesare Darmanin	110	Re-elected
IX	Salvatore Cachia Zammit	–	Unopposed
X	Fortunato Mizzi	346	
Special elected members
Seat	Name	Votes	Notes
Nobility and Landowners	Paolo Sammut	291	Alfonso Maria Micallef elected in by-election
Graduates	Andrè Pullicino	275	
Clergy	–	–	Borg Olivier elected in by-election
Chamber of Commerce	–	–	Beniamino Bonnici elected in by-election
Source: Schiavone, p179–180
