= Handball Malta =

Malta national handball association

Handball in Malta is the Malta national handball association. It was founded in 1995 and became a full member of the European Handball Federationin March 1996. A few months later it gained full recognition within the International Handball Federation.

== Overview ==
In 1999 the men's National team made its international debut in Cyprus during the first edition on the European Handball Federation Challenge Trophy. In the years 2003, 2009 and 2011, the Malta Handball Association organized the European Handball Federation Challenge Trophy.

In the season (2012/13), the association had a record of 39 registered teams and over 400 registered players taking part in the season's competitions.
