= 1870 Maltese general election =

- 13–18 June 1870

General elections were held in Malta between 13 and 18 June 1870.

== Background ==
The elections were held under the 1849 constitution, which provided for an 18-member Government Council, of which ten members would be appointed and eight elected.

== Results ==
A total of 2,732 people were registered to vote, of which 1,908 cast votes, giving a turnout of 70%.

Elected members
Name	Votes	Notes
Ramiro Barbaro	472	
Salvatore Cachia Zammit	490	
Francesco Fiteni	634	
Dun Luigi Fernandez	498	
Baruni Gauci Bonnici	95	Elected from Gozo
Emmanuel Scicluna	750	Re-elected
Ruggerio Sciortino	397	Re-elected
Ettore Zimelli	420	
Source: Schiavone, p176
