= National symbols of Malta =

The island nation of Malta has a variety of national flags and symbols, some current and some no longer in use.

== National flag and coat of arms ==
National flag since 1964

Coat of arms since 1988

== Other flags or symbols ==
=== Historical Flags ===
==== Knights' Flag (1530–1798) ====
Flag of Malta 1530–1798

==== Colonial Flags (19th century – 1964) ====
Several flags were used by the British Colonial administration of Malta prior to independence in 1964. Between 1798 and 1813, the Neapolitan flag and the Union Flag were used in Malta. After Malta became a Crown Colony a new flag was adopted, having the colours of the Order of Saint John, but with different proportions and defaced by the Union flag. Later flags consisted of the British Blue Ensign defaced by the coat of arms of Malta.

Colonial flag in the 19th century

Colonial flag 1875–1898

Colonial flag 1898-c.1923

Colonial flag c.1923–1943

Colonial flag 1943–1964

==== Standard of the Queen of Malta (1967–1974) ====
The Standard of the Queen of Malta was introduced in 1967. It consisted of a Maltese flag defaced by the personal flag of Queen Elizabeth II.

Royal standard of Malta 1967–1974

== Other symbols ==
National motto: Virtute et Constantia (Latin for Power and Consistency, since 1964)

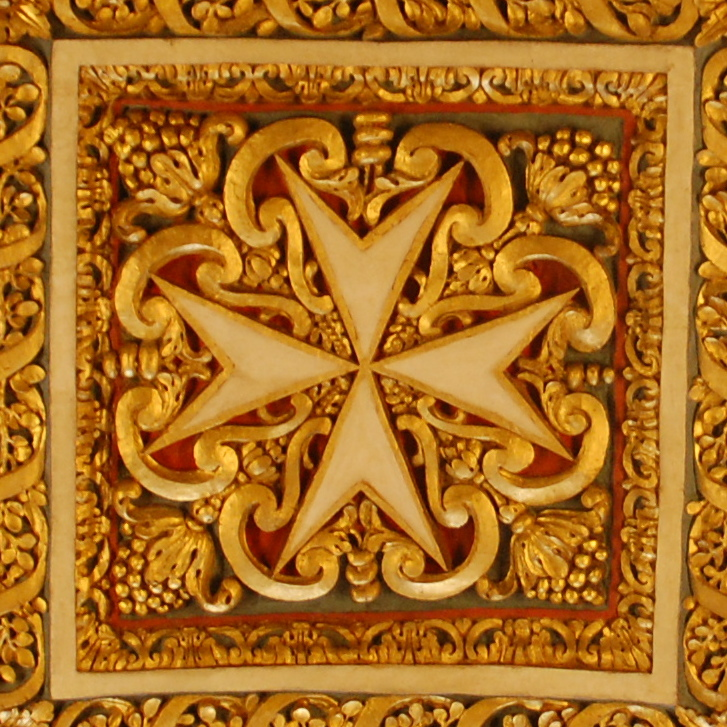
Maltese Cross (is-Salib ta' Malta, since 1530)

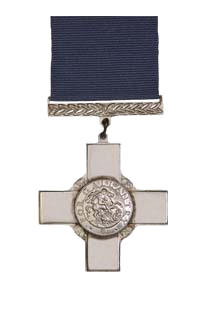
George Cross (since 1942)

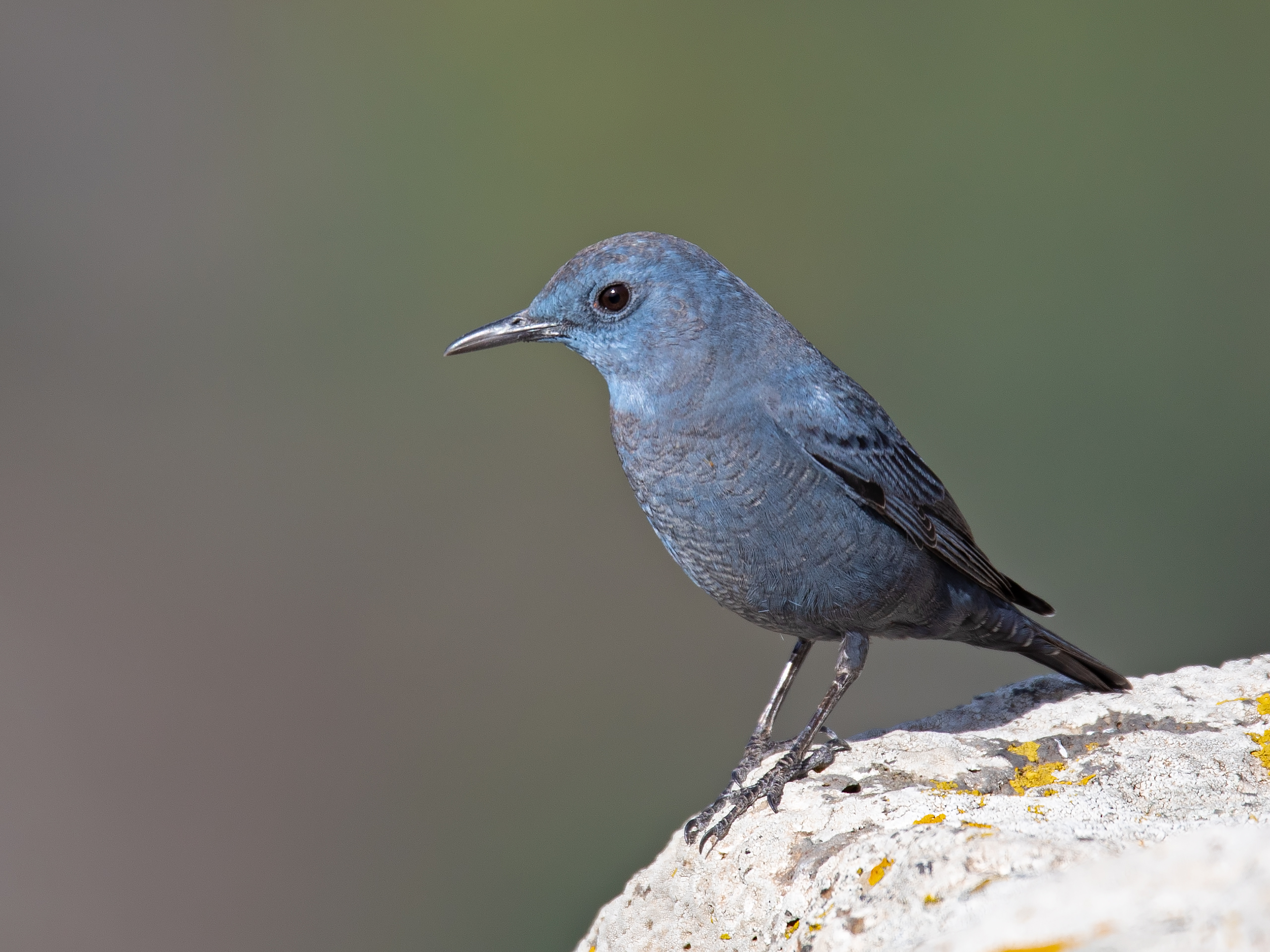
National bird: Blue rock thrush

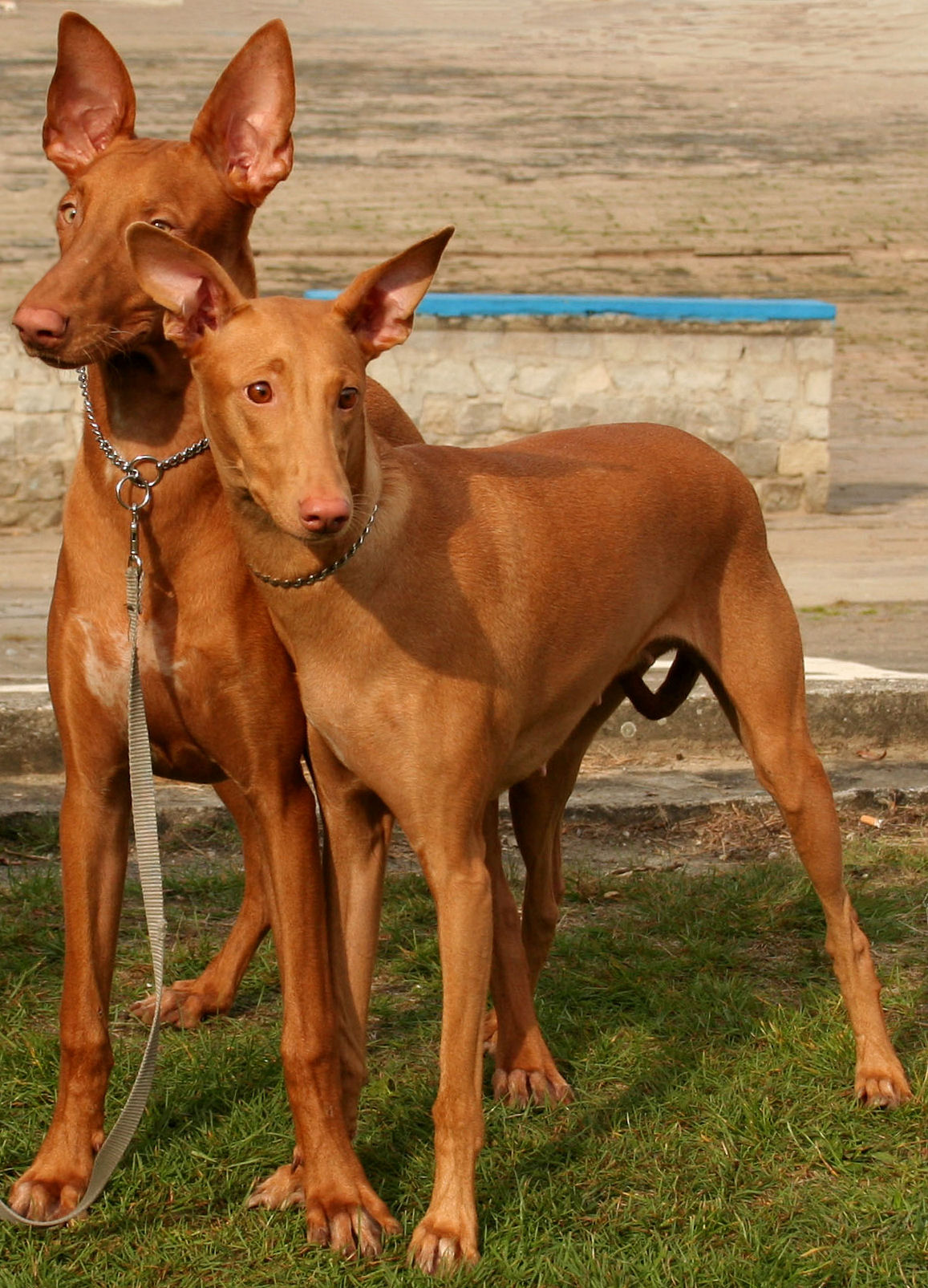
National dog breed and animal: Pharaoh Hound
