= Maltese Calypso =

The "Maltese Calypso" is a lively piece of Maltese folk music. Usually played in small, intimate bars with the aid of a guitar. Although it contains several verses, often only one or two may be played in one session.
