= Ganutell =

Ganutell is a Maltese art form of making artificial flowers from wire, thread, and beads.

In his introduction to the book Ganutell by Maria Kerr, the Maltese scholar and historian Guido Lanfranco states that in Maltese eighteenth and nineteenth century history, one finds numerous references to ganutell which can be considered to be the Maltese art of making artistic flowers. The word ganutell is derived from the Italian cannotiglio and in fact this craft, which can also be considered to be an art, was "imported" to Malta during the eighteenth century from mainland Europe. The way the craft eventually evolved has made it distinctively Maltese.

This craft had its ups and downs and by the mid-twentieth century a considerable section of the Maltese population hardly knew of the existence of ganutell and only a few had mastered the various techniques of ganutell. The techniques had been passed on from generation to generation by word of mouth with little or no documentation until it seemed that this craft was destined to be forgotten.

Towards the end of the twentieth century, the Education Division offered evening courses in ganutell and the craft started on its way to recovery. Today it is known not only in Malta but interest has been shown from a number of European countries, North and South America and also in Japan.

== See also ==
- Floristry
- Floral Design
