= Kont Diġa =

Kont Diġa is a 2009 Maltese full length feature film, directed by Mark Dingli and produced by Sascha Sammut.
