= Zamitello Palace =

Zamittello Palace
- Kastell Zamittellu
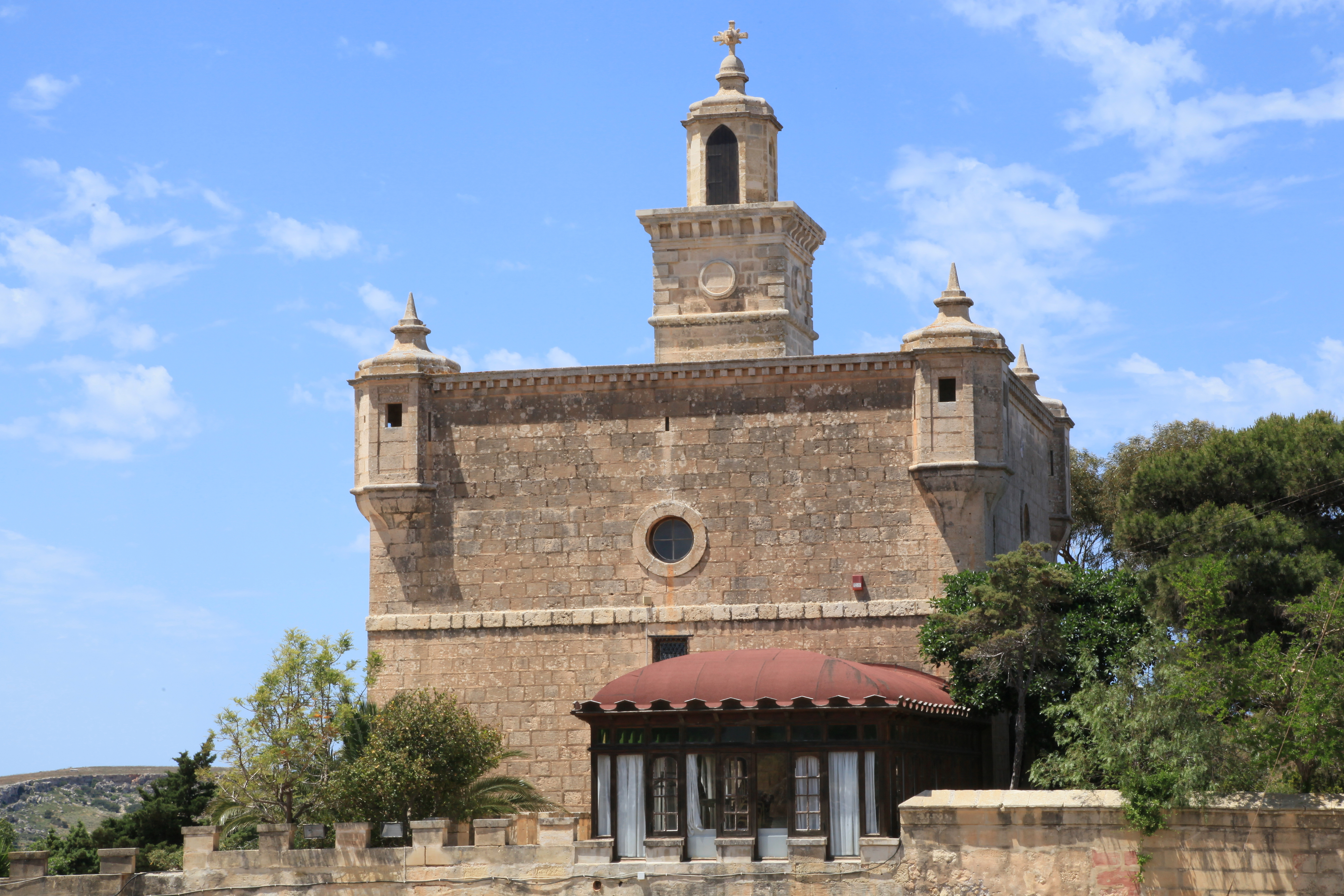
- View of the Zamittello Palace
- Interactive map of the Zamittello Palace area
- Alternative names: Castello Zamittello; Zamittello Tower

General information
- Status: Intact
- Type: Villa
- Architectural style: Victorian architecture
- Location: Mġarr, Malta
- Coordinates: 35°55′15.3″N 14°21′34.4″E
- Completed: 19th century
- Owner: Count Manduca Piscopo Macedonia

Technical details
- Material: Limestone

Design and construction
- Architect: Sir Guiseppe Nicola Zamitt

The Zamittello Palace, also known as Castello Zamittello (Maltese: Kastel Zamittellu) or Zamittello Tower, (Note: Sometimes also spelt Zamitello or Zamittello) is a 19th-century Victorian countryside folly on the outskirts of Mġarr in Malta. It was built by Sir Giuseppe Nicola Zamitt. It is open to public for events like weddings and celebrations.

This edifice must not be confused with the Palazzo Zammitello, designed by architect Edward Said and located in the city of Valletta.

== History ==
The building was built by the Sir Giuseppe Nicola Zamitt in the early nineteenth century as a countryside folly in the limits of Mġarr in Malta, although commercial sources claim that it dates back to 1675.

The last resident, Count Francis Sant Cassia was a cousin of the owner Count Francis Manduca and was murdered just outside the premises on 27 October 1988. The case has not been solved, though a government employee was arraigned for the shooting in 2006 but was still waiting for his trial by 2023.

== Architecture ==
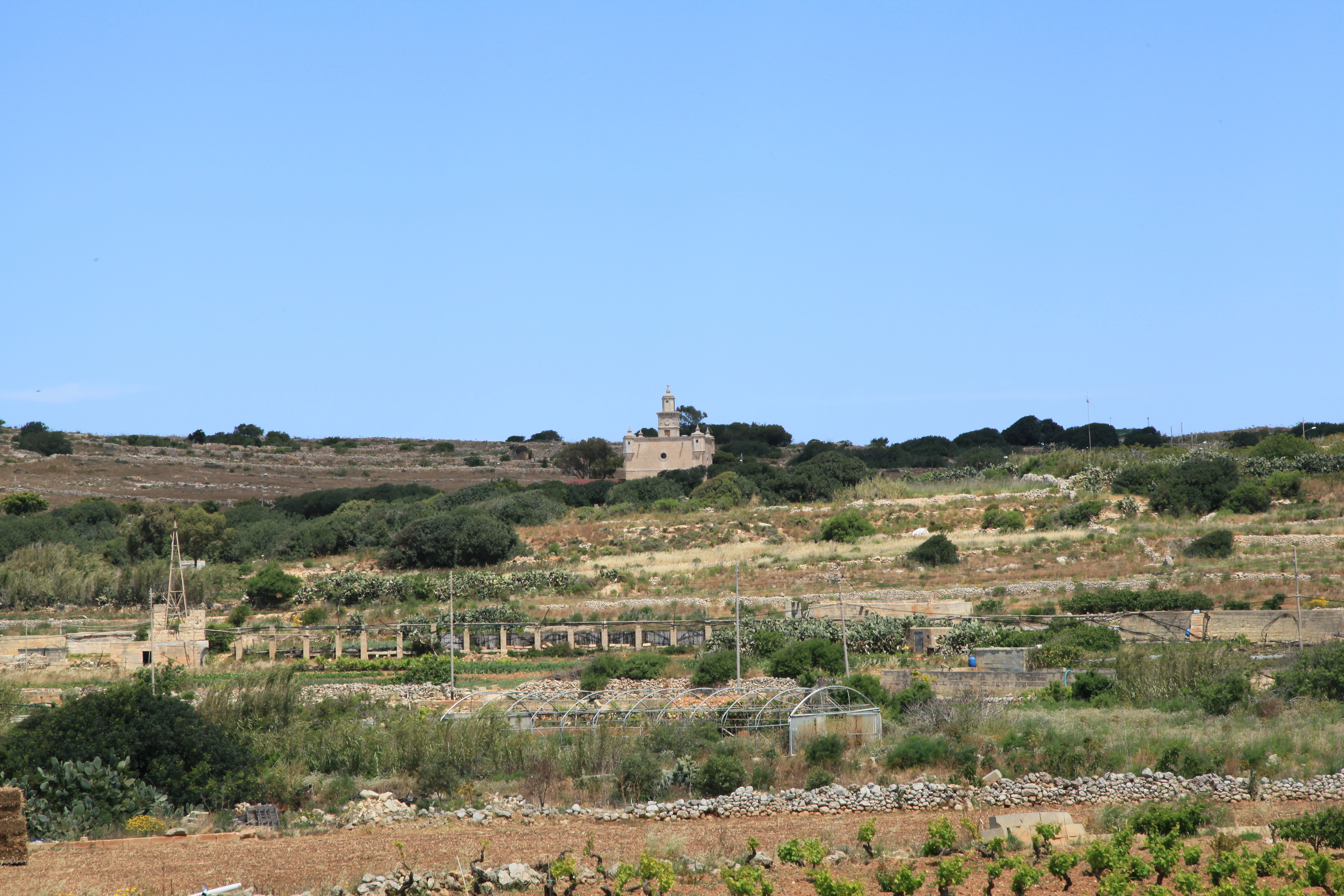
Castello Zammitello and the surrounding countryside

The building is a 19th-century ornate architectural folly, built in imitation of the Tower of London. Although it resembles a fortification, according to military architecture expert Stephen C. Spiteri, it is "entirely useless from a defensive point of view".

The names given to the building are a misnomer as it is closely comparable to a country house villa, and its outline is a square-shaped residence designed with typical Victorian architecture. It prominently features one roof-level turret and four guerites. The latter have a unique design and were never desirable nor used in Maltese military context. Above the turret sits a Christian cross, in the form of a crucifix.
