= Cycling in Malta =

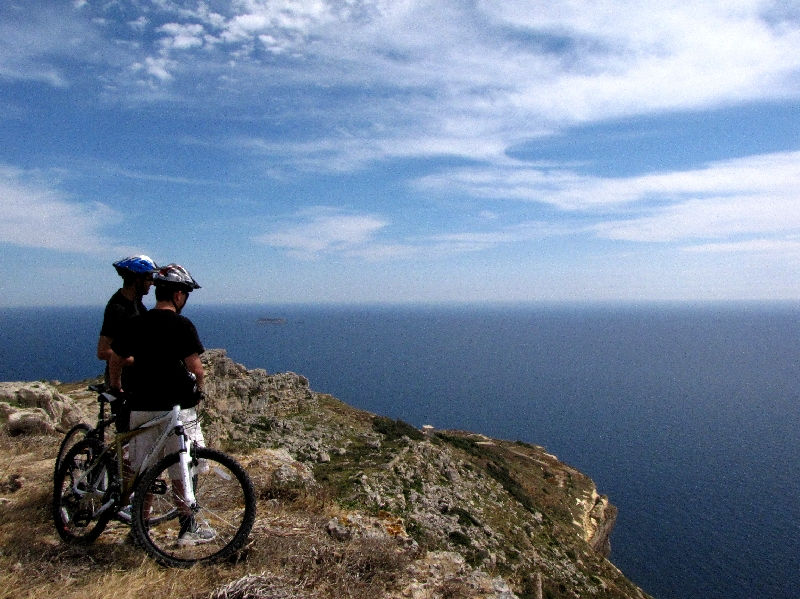
Bike Adventure in the North of Malta with Malta By Bike

The popularity of cycling in Malta as a sport, a means of commuting, and as a way of exploring the island of Malta is on the increase. In recent years, the Maltese authorities, most notably the Malta Transport Authority, have worked hard to make this activity more accessible and safer.

== History ==
Cycling is an established part of Maltese cultural heritage. It is also featured prominently in religious celebrations.

Most notably, the village feast of Zabbar, which is held annually on the first Sunday after the 8 September, features a motorcycle and bicycle pilgrimage each starting from Mosta and Rabat respectively. The Zabbar church is dedicated to “Our Lady of Grace” (Madonna tal-Grazzja), who is also the patron of cyclists.

== Cycling conditions in Malta ==
The island's small size – Malta's land area is just over 316 square kilometers (122 sq mi) – makes its easily accessible by bike.

Indeed, an increasing number of areas in the capital, Valletta, and elsewhere are being pedestrianized, making cycling the ideal means of visiting them. Despite its size, however, Malta's topography is quite hilly, and cycling may be quite challenging in some areas.

== Cycle lanes and paths ==
In 2006, the Malta Transport Authority introduced bicycle lanes to promote and encourage more people to use bicycles as a greener alternative to private car use. although cyclists do not normally use the lanes due to unsafe surfaces, mainly attributed to poor planning. Although initially motorists did not always respect these lanes, the situation has improved significantly. Cyclists are also allowed to use bus lanes. However, cycling is not allowed in tunnels. The few cycle lanes tend to end and start abruptly. They rarely follow regular commuting routes and do not seem to be maintained very regularly. Sliema local council forbids cycling along its promenade However, despite citing the support of sustainable and non-polluting modes of transport, there is no cohesive and specific national programme aimed at encouraging cycling.

== On the road conditions ==
Conditions for cyclists on the road are improving although cyclists should remain wary as to which routes to use and which to avoid. Cycling on main roads may at times be dangerous. Due to Malta's party scene and poor drunk driving record, early morning rides during weekends are particularly dangerous. Children on bikes and users of motorized bicycles are legally required to wear cycling helmets.

Road conditions themselves are improving although potholes and lack of proper surfacing, especially in smaller towns, remain an issue.

== Bicycle parking ==
The Malta Transport Authority has installed a number of bicycle parking bays in various spots around the island, particularly, in tourist areas.

While bicycle theft in Malta is not high, the usual precautions of locking the bike should be taken.

== Cycling and Malta’s public transport ==
With no trains and no underground, buses are the main means of public transport in Malta. The Maltese Government has privatized the public bus system. It is currently not possible to transport bicycles on public buses. However, it is possible to schedule the transportation of bicycles to any locations in Malta.
