= Internet in Malta =

Internet in Malta plays a key role in enhancing the nation's digital infrastructure and public services.

In the 2022 Digital Economy and Society Index (DESI) report, which assesses digital development among the 27 EU member countries, Malta has an overall ranking of 6th place. In human capital it ranks 7th, with notable statistics including 26% female Information and Communication Technology (ICT) specialists and 28% of Maltese enterprises providing ICT training, both exceeding the EU averages of 19% and 20%, respectively. In terms of connectivity, Malta ranks 16th with 100% Fixed Very High Capacity Network (VHCN) coverage, which exceeds the EU average of 70%. However, it lags significantly behind in 5G coverage and implementation.The country's 5th position in digital technology integration reflects its advancement in areas such as Big Data, Cloud, and Artificial Intelligence (AI). In digital public services, Malta performs very well with 100% coverage for services aimed at citizens and 97% for businesses, exceeding the EU averages of 75% and 82% respectively.

== Dial-up ==
Dial-up Internet access was first introduced in Malta in the mid-1990s by various ISPs, including Keyworld, Video On-Line, Global Net, MaltaNet, and Waldonet. This narrowband service has been entirely replaced by broadband technologies.

== Broadband ==
=== Fixed broadband ===
Malta's fixed broadband sector stands out with an 88% take-up rate, exceeding the European average of 78%. The country also leads in high-speed broadband, with 53% of connections offering speeds of at least 100 Mbps, above the EU's 41%. Notably, both Fast Broadband and Very High Capacity Network coverage have achieved full 100% coverage in Malta, significantly exceeding the EU averages of 90% and 70%, respectively. In Fibre to the Premises (FTTP) coverage, Malta records 70%, ahead of the EU's 64%.

=== Mobile broadband ===
The take-up rate in the country's mobile broadband sector is 87%, matching the general trend across the EU. Malta has 100% 5G coverage. The 5G spectrum assignment is at 25%, considerably less than the EU's 56%, and the coverage is only 20%, which is significantly lower than the EU's average of 66%.

== Public digital services ==
In the DESI 2024 report Malta achieved scores of 100% for citizen services and 100% for business services, exceeding the EU averages of 79% and 85%, respectively

The Servizz.gov portal is central to Malta's digital strategy, offering access to digital public services. The "Achieving a Service of Excellence" strategy, introduced in 2021, focuses on achieving full digitalization, emphasizing electronic identification (e-ID) and data sharing. Over half of the population uses the e-ID scheme, with initiatives underway to extend its functionality and introduce a digital wallet. The myHealth portal and the 'once only' principle are further examples of Malta's initiatives in digital health services and active data utilization.
