= Maltese Braille =

Braille alphabet of the Maltese language

- Script type: Alphabet
- Print basis: Maltese alphabet
- Languages: Maltese

Related scripts
- Parent systems: Braille: English Braille; Maltese Braille

Maltese Braille is the braille alphabet of the Maltese language. It was in the news in 2005 with the publication of the first braille Bible in Maltese.

== Chart ==
The alphabet is as follows. (See Maltese alphabet.) Ż has the form of international y.

⠀ (braille pattern blank)	a	b	c	ċ	d	e	f	ġ	g
h	ħ	i	j	k	l	m	n	o	p
q	r	s	t	u	v	w	x	z	ż

This chart is different from the UNESCO (2013) This chart is from Michael Micallef of the Malta Information Technology Agency

The system described in World Braille Usage 2013 appears to be an old proposal that was never implemented, one which followed the sounds of the letters of the print alphabet rather than the actual letters.
