= Taxation in Malta =

Taxation in Malta is levied by the State and it is administered by the Commissioner for Tax and Customs (il-Kummissarju tat-Taxxa u d-Dwana). The total tax revenues in 2014 amounted to €2.747 Billion, which represents 34.6% of the Maltese GDP. The main sources of tax revenue were value-added tax, income tax, and social security contributions.

== Indirect taxes ==
=== Value added tax ===
Value added tax is levied at the generic rate of 18% on the supply of goods and services. Reduced rates of 7% and 5% also apply whereas the supply of some goods and services is exempt from value added tax.

The reduced rate of 7% applies to certain accommodation services whereas the reduced rate of 5% applies on the supply of electricity, certain confectionery and similar items, certain medical accessories, certain printed matter, certain items which are for the exclusive used of disabled persons, importation of certain works of art, collector's items and antiques, minor repairs of bicycles, shoes and leather goods and clothing and household linen, domestic care services, admission to museums, art exhibitions, concerts and theatres, and usage of sporting facilities.

As for the exempt goods and services, some are exempt with credit whereas some are exempt without credit. A supply of good or service is deemed to be exempt with credit if the supplier is able to claim input value added tax incurred when purchasing the relevant good or service himself.

Supplies which are exempt with credit include the supply of exports and like transactions, international goods traffic, certain intra-community supplies, international transport and ancillary services, brokers and other intermediaries, certain sea vessels and aircraft, gold to the Central Bank of Malta, certain food, pharmaceutical goods, certain transport, and goods on board of cruise liners.

Conversely, those supplies which are exempt but without credit include the supply of certain immovable property, insurance services, credit, banking and other services, cultural and religious services, sports, services related to certain exempt services, services supplied by independent groups, services by non-profit making organisations to their members, lotteries, postal services, health and welfare, education, goods in respect of which the supplier had not qualified for input tax credits, broadcasting and water.

=== Import duties ===
Import duties are payable on the importation of dutiable goods in Malta which were grown, produced or manufactured in a country which is not a Member state of the European Union which are made available for consumption in Malta. The rate of duty is dependent on the type of good and in certain cases, the use thereof and is chargeable on the customs value of the imported goods.

=== Excise duty ===
Excise duty is payable on the production, extraction or importation of certain products from countries which are not Member states of the European Union which are made available for consumption in Malta. The rate of excise duty depends on the type of good which is subject to excise. These include certain alcoholic beverages, certain manufactured tobacco items, certain energy products, mobile telephony services, cement, pneumatic tyres and certain ammunition cartridges.

=== Duty on documents and transfers ===
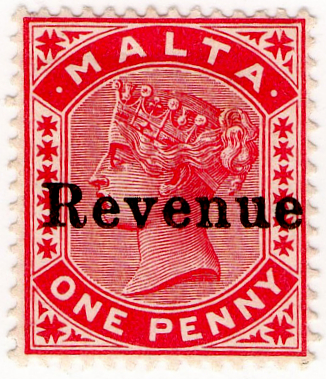
Revenue stamps were used to pay stamp duty from 1899 to the mid-20th century

Duty is payable on policies of insurance and transfers of immovable properties situated in Malta and certain securities. The rate of stamp duty on policies of insurance ranges from 0.1% to 11% whereas the applicable general rates on transfers of immovable properties and securities are 5% and 2% respectively. The duty payable is calculated on the dutiable value of the document or transfer in question and in practice it is paid by the transferee. Certain important exemptions are also provided by law.

== Direct taxes ==
The liability to tax in Malta depends on whether the person deriving the said income is domiciled and ordinarily resident in Malta. Persons who are both domiciled and ordinarily resident in Malta are liable to tax in Malta on all of their income and capital gains. Persons who are either domiciled or ordinarily resident in Malta are liable to tax in Malta on income and capital gains arising in Malta and income arising outside Malta and remitted to Malta. Persons who neither domiciled nor ordinarily resident in Malta are only liable to tax in Malta on income and capital gains arising in Malta.

Malta income tax is imposed on all persons, be they individuals or bodies of persons like companies, and on all sources of taxable income. Accordingly, Maltese tax law does not contemplate any separate corporate income tax.

=== Income tax for individuals ===
Resident individuals are subject to tax in Malta at progressive rates. Married individuals have the option to use the single rates whereas parents are entitled to utilise the parent rates. The 2017 income tax bands for resident individuals are the following:

Rates	Single Rates			Married Rates			Parent Rates		
Rates	From	To	Subtract	From	To	Subtract	From	To	Subtract
0%	€0	€9,100	€0	€0	€12,700	€0	€0	€10,500	€0
15%	€9,101	€14,500	€1,365	€12,701	€21,200	€1,905	€10,501	€15,800	€1,575
25%	€14,501	€19,500	€2,815	€21,201	€28,700	€4,025	€15,801	€21,200	€3,155
25%	€19,501	€60,000	€2,725	€28,701	€60,000	€3,905	€21,201	€60,000	€3,050
35%	€60,001	and over	€8,725	€60,001	and over	€9,905	€60,001	and over	€9,050

Non-resident individuals are also subject to tax in Malta at progressive rates. The first €700 are exempt from tax whereas they are subject to tax at the rate of 20% on the next €2,400, 30% on the next €4,700 and 35% on the remaining income.

=== Income tax for companies ===
Resident and non-resident companies are subject to tax at the rate of 35%. However, shareholders are entitled to claim a refund of the tax paid in Malta on some of the dividends they receive from Maltese companies. 5% is the effective tax rate for non resident & non domiciled shareholders.

=== Other information ===
Malta has transposed a number of directives adopted by the European Union where taxation is concerned, most notably the Parent Subsidiary Directive, the Mergers Directive, the Interests and Royalties Directive and, more recently, the Directive on Administrative Cooperation. Malta has also enacted the Common Reporting Standard.

Malta has also seventy Double Tax Treaty arrangements in force and five Tax Information Exchange Agreements, one of which is FATCA with the United States of America.

== Social security contributions ==
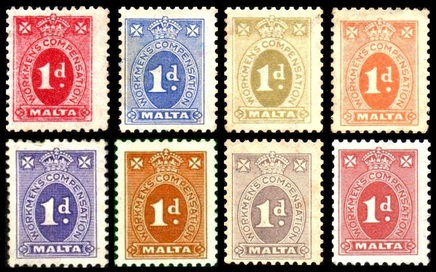
Revenue stamps issued under the Workmen's Compensation Ordinance (WCO) between 1929 and 1943. The WCO was replaced by the National Insurance Scheme in 1956.

Employed and self-employed individuals are required to pay social security contributions in Malta. The way how the relevant contributions are collected and the rate thereof depends on whether the person is employed or self-employed.

=== Employed individuals ===
An employed individual is liable to a social security contribution of 10%, but up to a maximum of €42.57, of his/her basic weekly wage. An equal contribution is also contributed by the State and the individual's employer, who is also liable to pay contributions for each employee of 0.3% of the corresponding basic weekly wage to the Maternity Fund.

Employers are also obliged to withhold the relevant the social security contributions from the individual's basic wage and remit the relevant amounts to the State.

=== Self-employed individuals ===
Self-employed individuals are required to pay social security contributions in three installments at the rate of 15% of the annual net income derived in the preceding year. The amount payable is dependent on whether the individual is deemed to be self-occupied or self-employed. Furthermore, half of the contribution effected by the self-employed is also contributed by the State.

=== Other information ===
Malta has also transposed the EU Posted Workers Directive and has concluded a number of Social Security Reciprocal Agreements with a number of countries, including Australia and Canada.
