= Malta Library and Information Association =

Professional librarian organization in Malta

The Malta Library and Information Association (MaLIA), an affiliated member of the International Federation of Library Associations (IFLA), was set up in 1969.

The association, whose membership is open to anyone involved in library and archive work, is linked with international similar associations and publishes monographs and other material for educational and informational purpose on a regular basis.

MaLIA is also one of the founder members of the Commonwealth Library Association (COMLA).

== Aims ==
- To create a meeting ground for people engaged or interested in the library profession.
- To work towards the improvement of librarians status, salary and qualifications.
- To advise regarding legislation affecting libraries and to promote such legislation.
- To encourage the establishment, promotion and use of libraries in the Maltese Islands.
- To organize courses in library science.

== See also ==
- Malta
