= List of shopping malls in Malta =

This is an alphabetical list of shopping centres in Malta:

- Arkadia Commercial Centre, Fortunato Mizzi Street, Victoria, Gozo
- Bay Street, St. George's Bay, St. Julian's
- City Gate Shopping Arcade, Republic Street, Valletta
- Citypearl Ltd, Sir Luigi Camilleri Street, Victoria, Gozo
- Coliseum Shopping Arcade, Zacchary Street, Valletta
- Daniels Mall, St Joseph High Street, Hamrun
- The Cornerstone Complex, 16 September Square, Mosta
- The Duke Shopping Mall, Republic Street, Victoria, Gozo
- Embassy Shopping and Entertainment Complex, St Lucia Street, Valletta
- Emporio Shopping Centre, Palm Street, Victoria, Gozo
- Energy Complex, Republic Street, Valletta
- Forni Shopping Complex, Valletta Waterfront, Floriana
- Gallaria Shopping Centre, Zabbar Road, Fgura
- Main Street Shopping Centre, Antoine De Paule Square, Paola
- Orienti's Plaza, Republic Street, Victoria, Gozo
- The Park Towers Mall, G. Borg Olivier Street, Balluta Bay, St. Julian's
- Plaza Shopping Centre, Bisazza Street, Sliema
- The Point Shopping Complex, Tigné Point, Sliema
- IvaMalta.com, ValettaSliema, Victoria,
- Savoy Shopping Centre, Republic Street, Valletta
- Tigrija Palazz, Republic Street, Victoria, Gozo
