= List of members of the European Parliament for Malta, 2009–2014 =

This is a list of the 5 members of the European Parliament for Malta in the 2009 to 2014 session. One person from Labour Party entered the Parliament in December 2011, bringing the number of MEPs to 6.

== List ==
Name	National party	EP Group
John Attard Montalto	Labour Party	S&D
Simon Busuttil	Nationalist Party (2009–2013)	EPP
David Casa	Nationalist Party	EPP
Roberta Metsola Tedesco Triccas	Nationalist Party (2013–)	EPP
Joseph Cuschieri	Labour Party	S&D
Louis Grech	Labour Party (2009–2013)	S&D
Edward Scicluna	Labour Party (2009–2013)	S&D
Marlene Mizzi	Labour Party (2013–)	S&D
Claudette Abela Baldacchino	Labour Party (2013–)	S&D

=== Party representation ===
National party	EP Group	Seats	±
Labour Party	S&D	4 / 6	Steady
Nationalist Party	EPP	2 / 6	Steady
