= 1889 Maltese general election =

- 24 and 25 September 1889

All 14 seats to the Government Council

General elections were held in Malta on 24 and 25 September 1889.

== Background ==
The elections were held under the Knutsford Constitution. Ten members were elected from single-member constituencies, whilst a further four members were elected to represent nobility and landowners, graduates, clerics and the Chamber of Commerce.

District	Towns
I	Valletta East
II	Valletta West, Sliema, St. Julian's
III	Floriana, Pietà, Ħamrun, Msida
IV	Cospicua, Żabbar
V	Birgu, Senglea
VI	Mdina
VII	Birkirkara
VIII	Qormi
IX	Żejtun
X	Gozo
Source: Schiavone, p13

== Results ==
A total of 9,777 people were registered to vote, of which just 3,383 cast votes, giving a turnout of 35%. Sigismondo Savona won constituencies I and II, resulting in a by-election for district II in November in which Saverio DePirlo was elected.

General elected members
Constituency	Name	Votes	Notes
I	Sigismondo Savona	399	
II	Sigismondo Savona	285	By-election held in November
III	Alfredo Naudi	71	
IV	Salvatore Grech	227	
V	Evaristo Castaldi	210	
VI	Dun Paolo Xuereb	–	Unopposed
VII	Antonio Lanzon	301	Re-elected
VIII	Guzè Muscat Azzopardi	–	Unopposed
IX	Salvatore Cachia Zammit	163	
X	Maria Mizzi	287	
Special elected members
Seat	Name	Votes	Notes
Nobility and Landowners	Ugo Testaferrata Abela	129	
Graduates	Alles. Chapelle	123	Previously elected in general districts
Clergy	Paolo Cachia	–	Re-elected unopposed
Chamber of Commerce	Luigi Pace Balzan	138	
Source: Schiavone, p178
