= 1911 Maltese general election =

General elections were held in Malta on 13 and 14 October 1911. Candidates ran in only three of the eight seats, with five remaining empty.

== Background ==
The elections were held under the Chamberlain Constitution, with members elected from eight single-member constituencies.

District	Towns
I	Valletta East
II	Valletta West, Msida, Sliema, St. Julian's
III	Floriana, Pietà, Ħamrun, Qormi, Żebbuġ
IV	Cospicua, Birgu, Kalkara, Żabbar, Marsaskala
V	Senglea, New Village, Luqa, Gudja, Għaxaq, Żejtun, Marsaxlokk, Saint George's Bay and Birżebbuġa
VI	Birkirkara, Balzan, Lija, Attard, Għargħur, Naxxar, Mosta, Mellieħa
VII	Mdina, Rabat, Siġġiewi, Dingli, Qrendi, Mqabba, Żurrieq, Bubaqra, Safi, Kirkop
VIII	Gozo and Comino
Source: Schiavone, p17

== Results ==
A total of 8,986 people were registered to vote.

Constituency	Name	Votes	Notes
I	Andrè Pullicino	217	Re-elected
II	–	–	No candidates
III	–	–	No candidates
IV	–	–	No candidates
V	Carmelo Lanzon	242	
VI	Antonio Dalli	141	
VII	–	–	No candidates
VIII	–	–	No candidates
Source: Schiavone, p182
