= Nibbia Chapel =

- Chapel of Bones
- Il-Kappella ta' Nibbia; Il-Kappella tal-Għadam
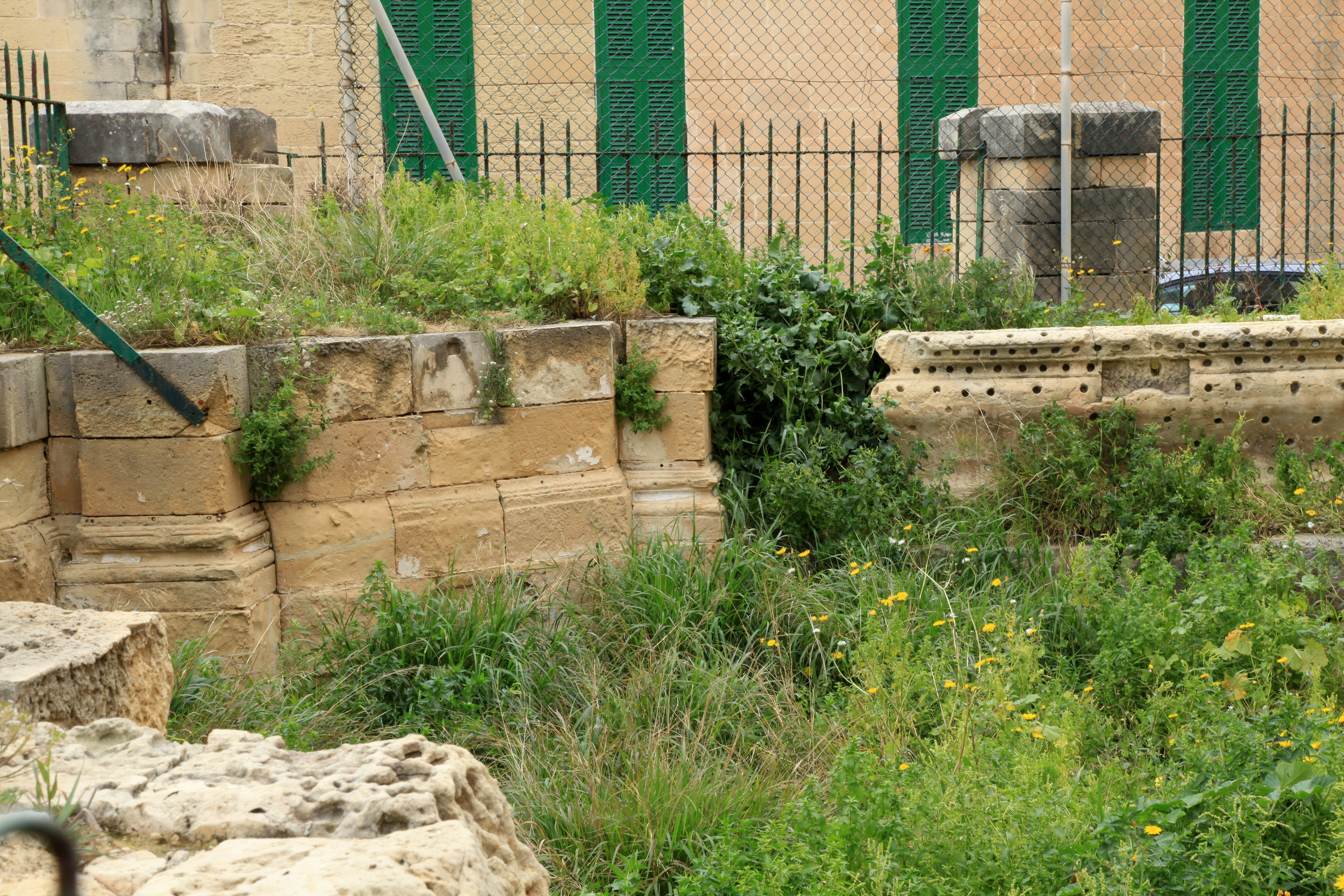
- Overgrown remains of the Nibbia Chapel
- Nibbia Chapel
- 35°54′0″N 14°31′5″E
- Location: Valletta, Malta
- Denomination: Roman Catholic

History
- Status: Chapel
- Founded: 1619
- Founder: Fra Giorgio Nibbia
- Dedication: Our Lady of Mercy

Architecture
- Functional status: Ruins
- Architect: Romano Carapecchia (attributed)
- Style: Baroque
- Completed: 1731
- Demolished: 14 February 1941 (bombed); Late 1970s (demolished)

Specifications
- Materials: Limestone

The Nibbia Chapel (Maltese: Il-Kappella ta' Nibbia) was a Roman Catholic chapel in Valletta, Malta, which was dedicated to Our Lady of Mercy. It was originally built in 1619 by Fra Giorgio Nibbia, a knight of the Order of St. John, and it was located near a cemetery where deceased patients from the nearby Sacra Infermeria were buried.

The chapel was rebuilt in the Baroque style in 1731. In 1852 its crypt was decorated with skeletal human remains taken from the adjacent cemetery, giving rise to the name Chapel of Bones (Maltese: Il-Kappella tal-Għadam). The chapel was heavily damaged by aerial bombardment in 1941, and its ruins were subsequently demolished, leaving only some foundations on the site. However, the crypt might still survive intact.

== History ==
The Nibbia Chapel was built in 1619 with funds of the knight Fra Giorgio Nibbia, who was buried there upon his death. The chapel was dedicated to Our Lady of Mercy (or the Madonna della Pietà), and it stood next to a cemetery where patients who had died at the Sacra Infermeria were buried. It was used mainly to celebrate mass for the souls of these patients. The chapel was commonly referred to as ta' Nibbia after the knight who built it, but it was also called taz-zuntier, a Maltese word which formerly meant "cemetery".

The original chapel was dismantled in 1730, and it was rebuilt in 1731 to designs attributed to the Baroque architect Romano Carapecchia. In 1776, the Sacra Infermeria cemetery was cleared, and the human remains were transferred into an ossuary beneath the chapel.

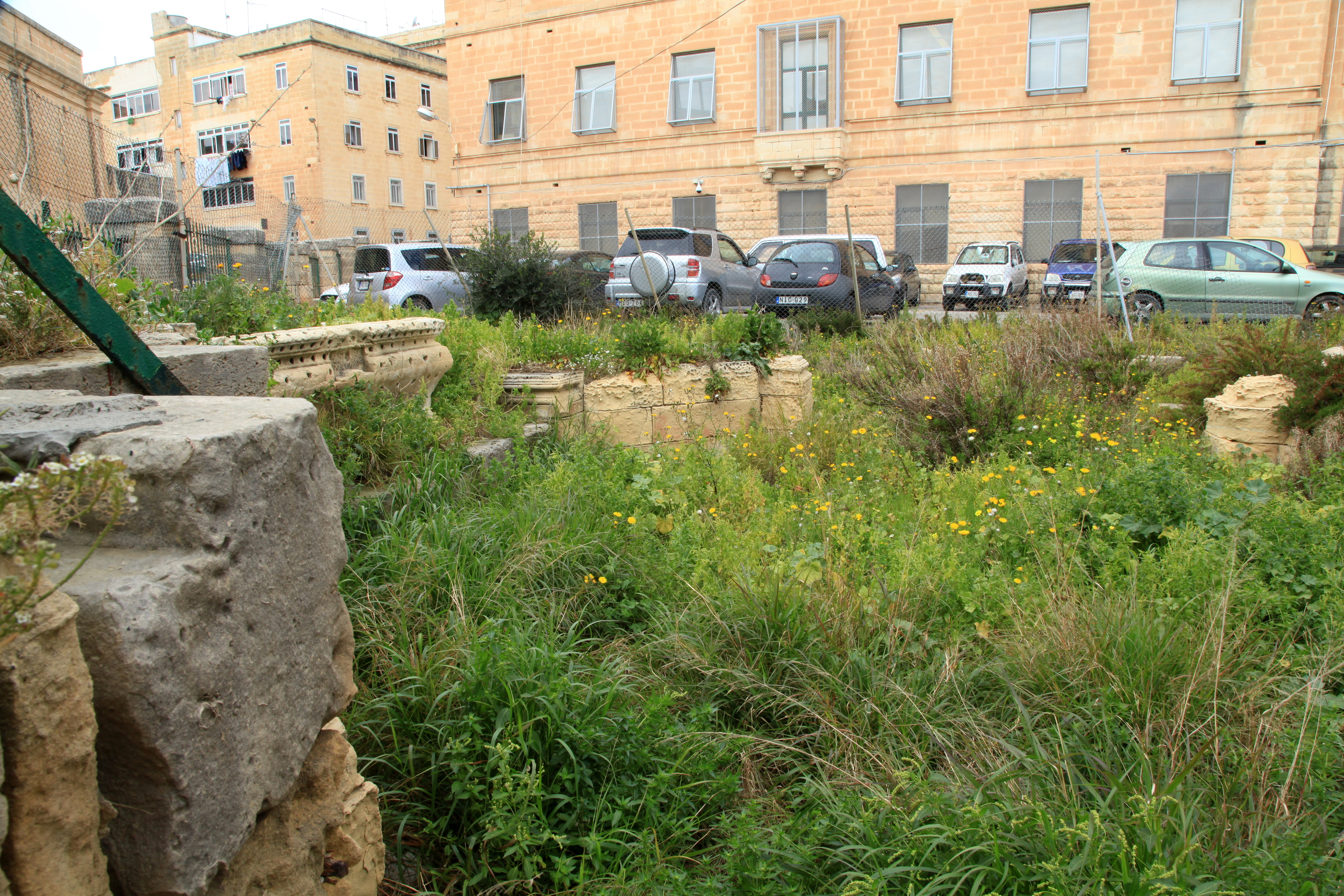
The remains of the Nibbia Chapel

In 1852, chaplain of the hospital Rev. Sacco decided to decorate the crypt with human remains from the cemetery. It therefore became known as the Chapel of Bones, and by the early 20th century it had become an attraction for both the Maltese and tourists, being featured on a number of postcards. Over the years, local tradition held that the bones in the crypt did not belong to Sacra Infermeria patients, but to soldiers who had died during the Great Siege of Malta in 1565.

Saint George Preca held conferences about Christian eschatology within this chapel. Several pilgrimages were held at the chapel, especially during the month of November.

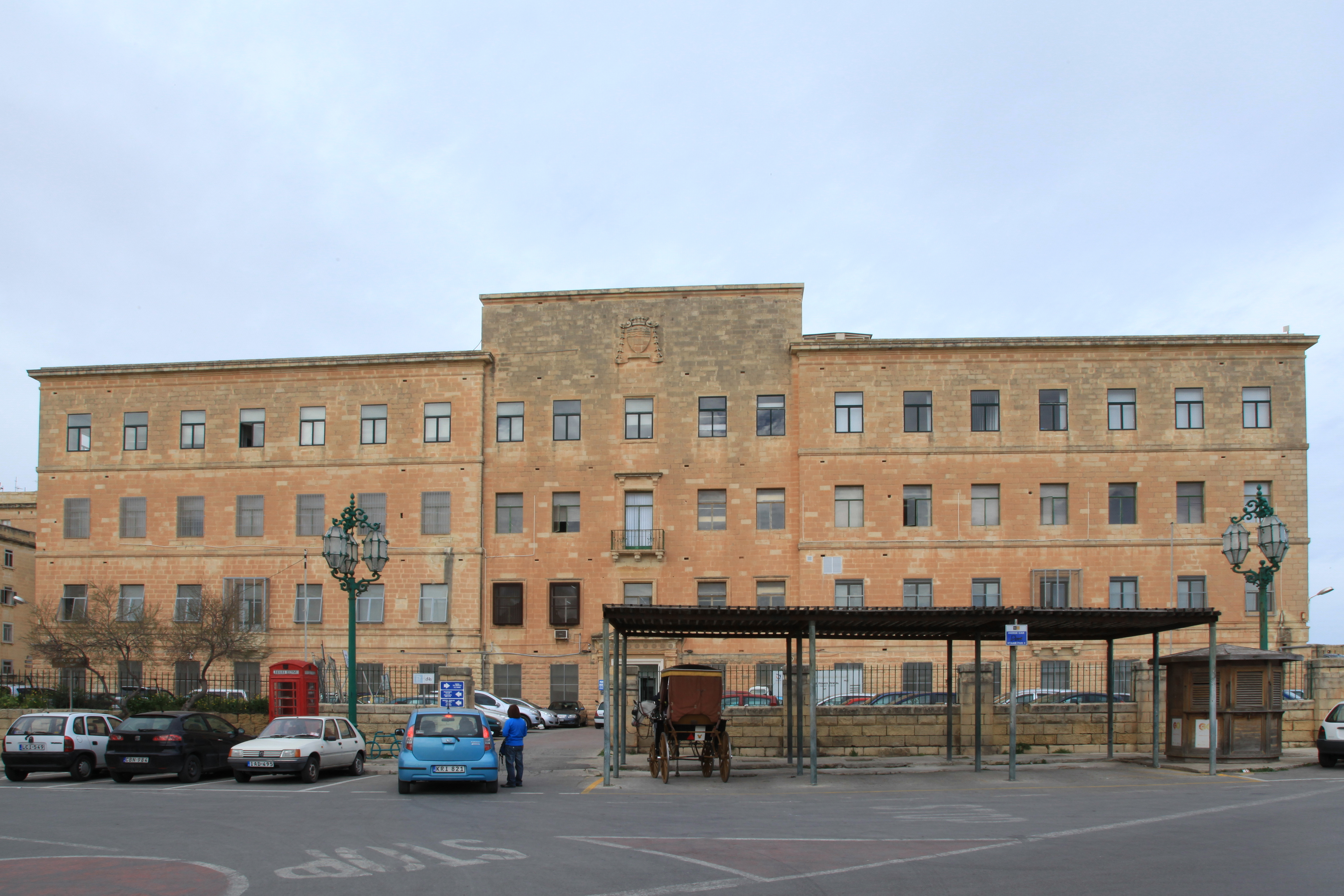
Evans Building, whose grounds contain the chapel's remains

The chapel was damaged by aerial bombardment on 14 February 1941, during World War II. Some human remains were apparently collected and buried at the Addolorata Cemetery, although the crypt might still survive intact. The chapel's ruins were demolished in the late 1970s, leaving only a few remains on the site.

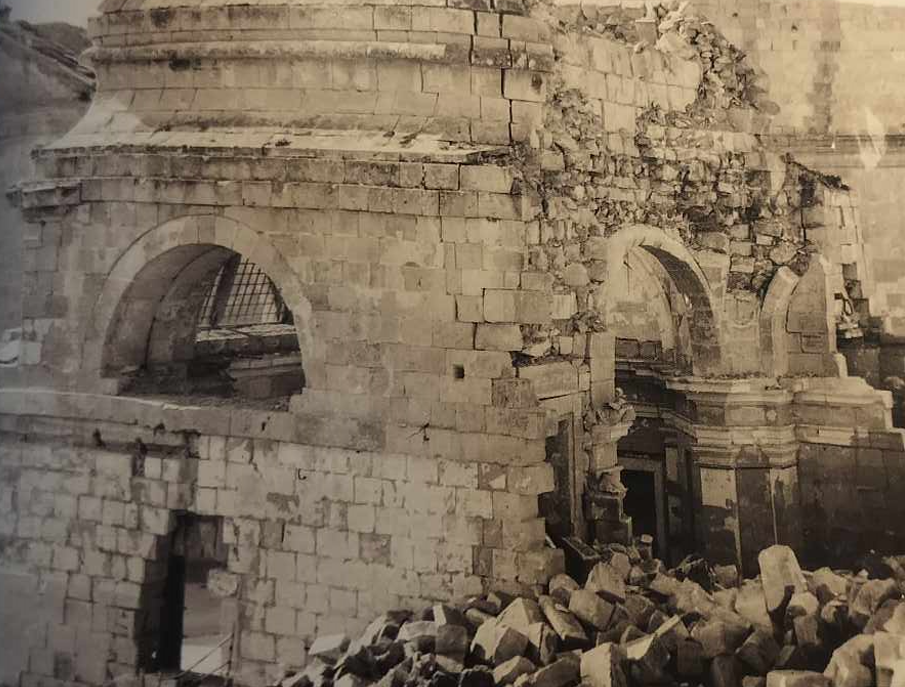
The damaged Nibbia Chapel after aerial bombardment

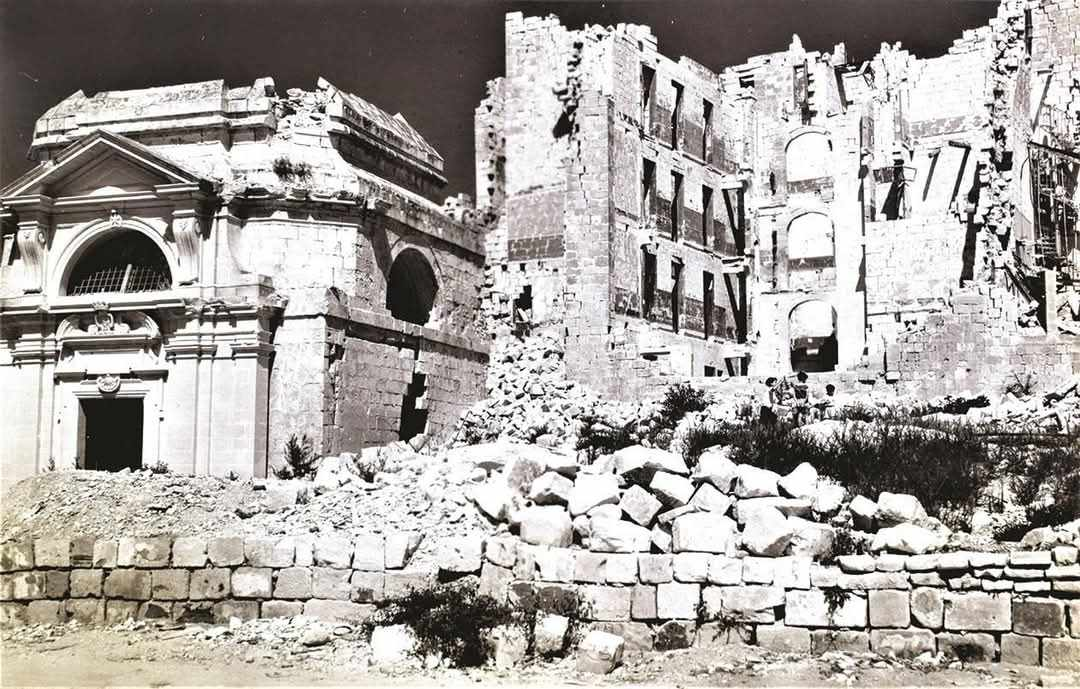
The area surrounding the damaged Nibbia Chapel after aerial bombardment

The remains of the chapel, which include Nibbia's sarcophagus, are now found in a cordoned area in the car park of Evans Building. The ruins were given a facelift by the Archaeological Services Cooperative and the Grupp Arkeologiku Malti (Maltese Archeology Group) in 2002, but they have since fallen into a state of disrepair. These remains were scheduled as a Class B national monument by the Malta Environment and Planning Authority in 2008.

== Architecture ==
The Nibbia Chapel was an octagonal building with a dome. The façade had a large portal with the main doorway, which was flanked by two sets of Doric pilasters on either side. The door had an architrave with a marble plaque, which was topped by a broken rounded pediment. The upper section had a central arched window between small clusters of pilasters and running scrolls, and it was separated from the lower half of the structure by a thin cornice. Another triangular pediment topped the building.

=== Crypt ===
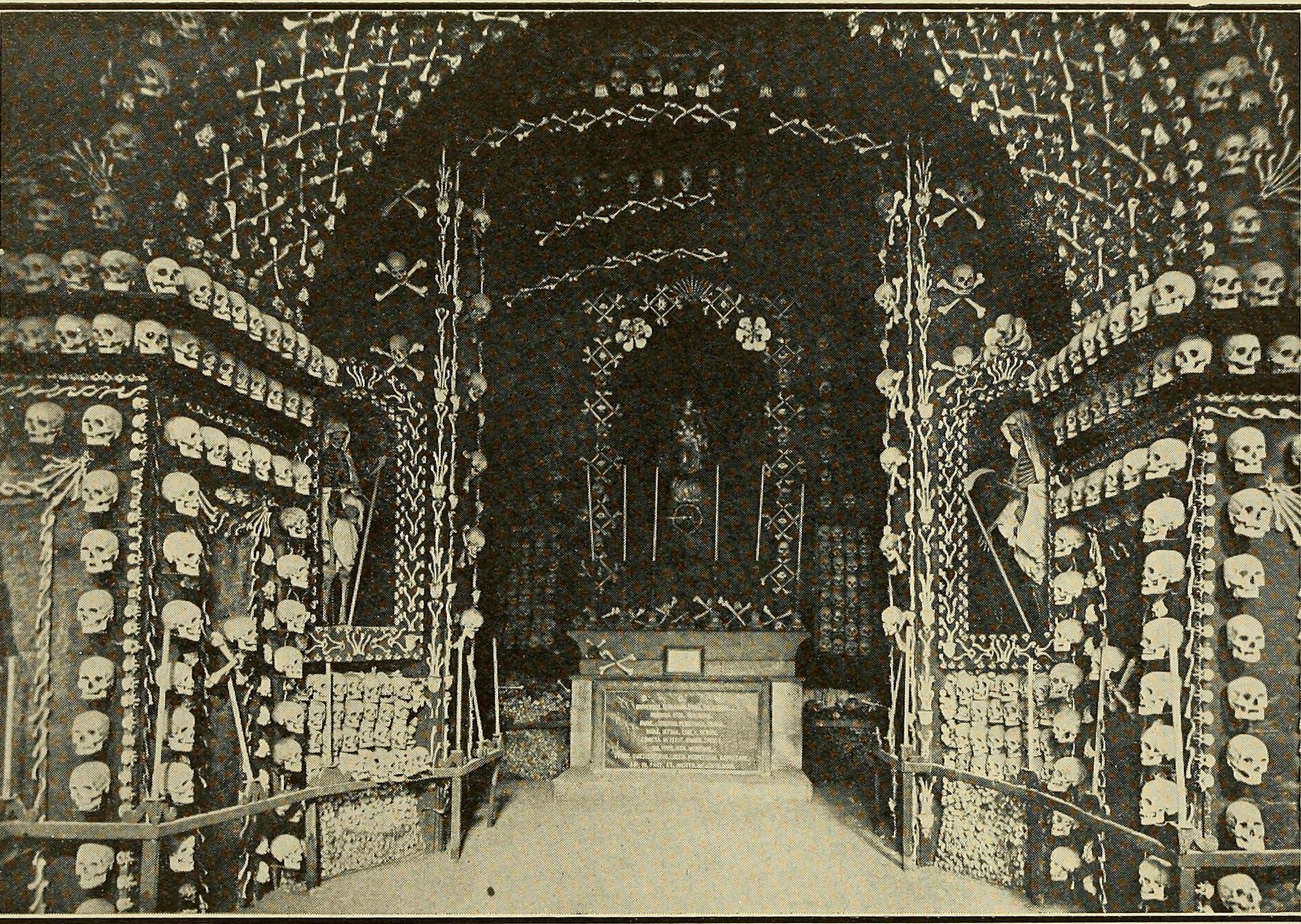
The Chapel of Bones

The chapel had a vaulted underground crypt which served as an ossuary. Skeletal remains of patients who had died at the Sacra Infermeria were arranged in decorative patterns on the walls, and the crypt therefore became popularly known as the Chapel of Bones. The crypt had one altar, which had a Latin inscription lamenting the ephemerality of life and requesting prayers for the deceased.

The exact location of the crypt has been lost, and it could have been either under the chapel itself or in the immediate vicinity. Although the chapel was destroyed during the World War II bombings, the crypt might still exist.

== See also ==
- Culture of Malta
- History of Malta
- List of churches in Malta
- Religion in Malta
