= 1915 Maltese general election =

General elections were held in Malta on 19 and 20 January 1915. Two of the eight elected seats were uncontested.

== Background ==
The elections were held under the Chamberlain Constitution, with members elected from eight single-member constituencies.

District	Towns
I	Valletta East
II	Valletta West, Msida, Sliema, St. Julian's
III	Floriana, Pietà, Ħamrun, Qormi, Żebbuġ
IV	Cospicua, Birgu, Kalkara, Żabbar, Marsaskala
V	Senglea, New Village, Luqa, Gudja, Għaxaq, Żejtun, Marsaxlokk, Saint George's Bay and Birżebbuġa
VI	Birkirkara, Balzan, Lija, Attard, Għargħur, Naxxar, Mosta, Mellieħa
VII	Mdina, Rabat, Siġġiewi, Dingli, Qrendi, Mqabba, Żurrieq, Bubaqra, Safi, Kirkop
VIII	Gozo and Comino
Source: Schiavone, p17

== Results ==
A total of 7,907 people were registered to vote. Cikku Azzopardi was elected in both constituencies I and VIII. He chose to give up the seat for constituency VIII, resulting in a by-election in March 1915. However, the candidate elected in the by-election resigned immediately after the election.

Constituency	Name	Votes	Notes
I	Cikku Azzopardi	283	
II	Giuseppe Vassallo	203	
III	Antonio Dalli	158	Re-elected
IV	Luigi Rosignaud	–	Unopposed
V	Serafin Vella	324	
VI	G Gauci Tramblett	–	Unopposed
VII	Carmelo dei Conti Sant	243	
VIII	Cikku Azzopardi	368	By-election held in March 1915
Source: Schiavone, pp182–183
