= 1899 Maltese general election =

General elections were held in Malta on 7 March 1899. All seats had only a single candidate.

== Background ==
The elections were held under the Knutsford Constitution. Ten members were elected from single-member constituencies, whilst a further three members were elected to represent nobility and landowners, graduates and the Chamber of Commerce. The seat previously reserved for clerics was abolished.

District	Towns
I	Valletta East
II	Valletta West, Sliema, St. Julian's
III	Floriana, Pietà, Ħamrun, Msida
IV	Cospicua, Żabbar
V	Birgu, Senglea
VI	Mdina
VII	Birkirkara
VIII	Qormi
IX	Żejtun
X	Gozo
Source: Schiavone, p13

== Results ==
A total of 9,581 people were registered to vote, although no votes were cast due to all candidates being unopposed.

General elected members
Constituency	Name	Votes	Notes
I	Andrè Pullicino	–	Re-elected (previously in the graduates seat)
II	Paolo Sammut	–	Re-elected
III	Antonio Dalli	–	Re-elected
IV	Franc Cardona	–	Re-elected
V	Cesare Darmanin	–	Re-elected (previously in constituency VIII)
VI	Nutar Petro Bartoli	–	Re-elected
VII	Fransesco Wettinger	–	Re-elected
VIII	Edoardo Semini	–	
IX	Salvatore Cachia Zammit	–	Re-elected
X	Fortunato Mizzi	–	Re-elected
Special elected members
Seat	Name	Votes	Notes
Nobility and Landowners	Alfonso Maria Micallef	–	Re-elected
Graduates	Beniamino Bonnici	–	Re-elected (previously in the Chamber of Commerce seat)
Chamber of Commerce	Joseph Bencini	–	Re-elected (previously in constituency V)
Source: Schiavone, p180
