= Bible translations into Maltese =

The Maltese nationalist Mikiel Anton Vassalli translated the Gospels and Acts of the Apostles into the Maltese language in 1829. This was then known as the "Kafir version". Michael Camilleri (c. 1814–1903), afterwards vicar of Lyford, Berkshire, revised Vassalli's version and translated the New Testament and the Anglican Book of Common Prayer into Maltese.

== Roman Catholic translations ==
In 1959, the Roman Catholic priest and linguist Pietru Pawl Saydon published a translation of the Bible in Maltese from Hebrew and Greek. The translation had a strong emphasis on Semitic Maltese vocabulary in an attempt to keep the original meaning of the Hebrew source. The translation by Saydon was rejected by the Roman Catholic Church in Malta in relation to the Language Question and political climate in Malta at the time.
