= 1892 Maltese general election =

- 5 and 6 September 1892

All 14 seats to the Government Council

General elections were held in Malta on 5 and 6 September 1892. Elections were only held in three constituencies as all other members were returned unopposed.

== Background ==
The elections were held under the Knutsford Constitution. Ten members were elected from single-member constituencies, whilst a further four members were elected to represent nobility and landowners, graduates, clerics and the Chamber of Commerce.

District	Towns
I	Valletta East
II	Valletta West, Sliema, St. Julian's
III	Floriana, Pietà, Ħamrun, Msida
IV	Cospicua, Żabbar
V	Birgu, Senglea
VI	Mdina
VII	Birkirkara
VIII	Qormi
IX	Żejtun
X	Gozo
Source: Schiavone, p13

== Results ==
A total of 10,522 people were registered to vote, of which just 1,062 cast votes, giving a turnout of 10%.

General elected members
Constituency	Name	Votes	Notes
I	Sigismondo Savona	–	Re-elected unopposed
II	Latterio Vallone	–	Unopposed
III	Giuseppe Bonavia	174	
IV	Francesco Mifsud	–	Unopposed
V	Evaristo Castaldi	–	Re-elected unopposed
VI	Nutar Dei Marchesi Mallia Tabone	–	Unopposed
VII	Paolo Sammut	157	
VIII	Giovanni Vassallo	–	Unopposed
IX	Salvatore Cachia Zammit	–	Re-elected unopposed
X	Paolo Sammut	565	
Special elected members
Seat	Name	Votes	Notes
Nobility and Landowners	Saverio DePiro	–	Unopposed
Graduates	Goffredo Adami	–	Unopposed
Clergy	Ign. Panzavecchia	–	Unopposed
Chamber of Commerce	Giuseppe Bencini	–	Unopposed
Source: Schiavone, pp178–179
