= 2006 Maltese local elections =

- March 11, 2006
- Registered: 125,351
- Turnout: 82,149 - 65.5%
	Majority party	Minority party	Third party
Party	Labour	Nationalist	Democratic Alternative
Seats won	84	64	2
Popular vote	42,779	34,002	1,415
Percentage	53.95%	42.90%	1.78%
	Fourth party	Fifth party	Sixth party
Party	Marsascala Independent Group	Bormla Ġdida	A1 Giordani Serjetà U Onestà
Seats won	1
Popular vote	604	168	134
Percentage	0.76%	0.21%	0.17%
	Seventh party	Eighth party	Ninth party
Party	Partit tal-Ajkla	Azzjoni għall-Imdina	Independent
Popular vote	30	13	134
Percentage	0.04%	0.02%	0.17%

Local council elections were held for 23 localities in Malta on 11 March 2006. Traditionally, this round of elections has given positive results to the Nationalist Party, with the biggest villages apart from Żabbar, being the traditional villages in which the Nationalist Party (Sliema, Naxxar, Birkirkara) obtains best results. Eighty-eight percent of the voting documents were collected.

== Results ==
=== Overview ===
The Malta Labour Party (MLP) has won the Local Council elections with 53.8% of first count votes. The PN obtained 43% while Alternattiva Demokratika and independent candidates obtained 3.2%. While 3.2% may seem insignificant on a national level, this is not in the case of one locality, namely Marsaskala, as 0.76% of these translated in 604 votes and a seat for a new independent group, Grupp Indipendenti Marsaskala in the Marsascala Local Council, headed by ex PN MP Dr Josie Muscat.

=== Results Table ===
Party	Votes	%	Seats
Labour Party	42,779	53.96	84
Nationalist Party	34,002	42.89	60
Democratic Alternative	1,415	1.78	2
Marsascala Independent Group	604	0.76	1
Bormla Ġdida (Note: only in Bormla)	168	0.21	–
A1 Giordani Serjetà u Onestà (Note: only in San Ġwann)	134	0.17	–
Partit tal-Ajkla (Note: only in Żabbar)	30	0.04	–
Azzjoni għall-Imdina (Note: only in Mdina)	13	0.02	–
Independents	134	0.17	–
Total	79,279	100.00	147
Valid votes	79,279	96.53	
Invalid/blank votes	2,850	3.47	
Total votes	82,129	100.00	
Registered voters/turnout	125,351	65.52	
Source: Electoral Commission of Malta

== Background in multiple localities ==
- The Nationalist Party is at present in government. It has introduced several measures which might affect the election such as the rise in the price of electricity.
- A former Nationalist MP, Dr Josie Muscat along with three other members of the new GIM (Maltese: Grupp Indipendenti Marsascala), has successfully contested the elections in Marsaskala as an independent candidate on a campaign opposing the waste recycling plant in Marsaskala, the fish farms industry just 6 km away from Marsascala and the exclusion of Marsaskala from the tourist zone by the government. The three other G.I.M contestants were Marvic Attard Gialanze (first independent female mayor in the first-ever local councils' elections in 1994), John J Cole, and Mariella Cutajar.
  - Dr. Muscat was elected to Marsaskala's 2006/9 local council representing G.I.M., whose group garnered well over 600 first votes. Therefore the Nationalist Party elected two councillors instead of the three in Marsascala, losing one seat.
- There was criticism regarding the government's plans on a recycling plant in Marsascala and the recently announced large scale fish farm concentration just 6 km away from this idyllic picturesque sea-side village.
- In Sliema, local residents were angry at the approach the Local Council has taken to the building up of a new multi-storage car park in a residential area.
