= 1888 Maltese general election =

- 1–3 March 1888

General elections were held in Malta between 1 and 3 March 1888.

== Background ==
The elections were the first held under the new Knutsford Constitution. The number of elected seats was increased from eight to ten, whilst a further four members were elected to represent nobility and landowners, graduates, clerics and the Chamber of Commerce.

== Results ==
A total of 9,696 people were registered to vote, of which just 3,487 cast votes, giving a turnout of 36%.

General elected members
Name		Votes	Notes
Dun Pawl Agius		1,520	Re-elected
Baruni Azzopardi		1,345	
Aless. Baruni Chapelle		1,312	
Don Teodoro Galea		1,370	
Oreste Grech Mifsud		1,641	
Antonio Lanzon		1,239	
Fortunato Mizzi		–	Re-elected from Gozo unopposed
Enrico Naudi		1,140	
Paolo Sammut		1,060	
Edoardo Vella		1,023	
Special elected members
Seat	Name	Votes	Notes
Nobility and Landowners	Gerald Strickland	256	
Graduates	Filippo Sceberras	254	
Clergy	Paolo Cachia	–	Unopposed
Chamber of Commerce	Lorenzo Mifsud	–	Unopposed
Source: Schiavone, pp177–178
