= 1860 Maltese general election =

- 24 January 1860

General elections were held in Malta on 24 January 1860.

== Background ==
The elections were held under the 1849 constitution, which provided for an 18-member Government Council, of which ten members would be appointed and eight elected.

== Results ==
A total of 3,343 people were registered to vote, of which 3,044 cast votes, giving a turnout of 91%.

Elected members
Name	Votes	Notes
Vinc. Bugeja	729	
Francesco Fiteni	1,062	
Franc Grungo	803	
Pasquale Mifsud	618	
Guis. Randon	630	
Filippo Pullicino	967	
Emmanuel Scicluna	1,085	
Ruggerio Sciortino	258	Elected from Gozo
Source: Schiavone, p176
