= 1900 Maltese general election =

General elections were held in Malta on 16 and 17 September 1900, the third in three years. Only one of the thirteen elected seats was contested.

== Background ==
The elections were held under the Knutsford Constitution. Ten members were elected from single-member constituencies, whilst a further three members were elected to represent nobility and landowners, graduates and the Chamber of Commerce.

District	Towns
I	Valletta East
II	Valletta West, Sliema, St. Julian's
III	Floriana, Pietà, Ħamrun, Msida
IV	Cospicua, Żabbar
V	Birgu, Senglea
VI	Mdina
VII	Birkirkara
VIII	Qormi
IX	Żejtun
X	Gozo
Source: Schiavone, p13

== Results ==
A total of 9,301 people were registered to vote, although votes were only cast in one constituency.

General elected members
Constituency	Name	Votes	Notes
I	Andrè Pullicino	–	Re-elected
II	Emmanuel Testaferrata Bonnici Axiaq	–	
III	Cikku Azzopardi	–	
IV	Francesco Cardona	–	Re-elected
V	Cesare Darmanin	–	Re-elected
VI	Nutar Petro Bartoli	–	Re-elected
VII	Fransesco Wettinger	–	Re-elected
VIII	Edoardo Semini	106	Re-elected
IX	Salvatore Cachia Zammit	–	Re-elected
X	Fortunato Mizzi	–	Re-elected
Special elected members
Seat	Name	Votes	Notes
Nobility and Landowners	Alfonso Maria Micallef	–	Re-elected
Graduates	Beniamino Bonnici	–	Re-elected
Chamber of Commerce	Paolo Sammut	–	Re-elected (previously in constituency II)
Source: Schiavone, pp180–181
