= Lou Bondi =

Maltese television broadcast journalist

- Born: July 22, 1956 (age 68); Gozo, Malta
- Occupation(s): Talk show host, media mogul

Lou Bondì (born July 22, 1956) is a Maltese television broadcast journalist. He used to present the programme Bondi Plus on PBS and he has been broadcasting in Maltese television since 1992. He is one of the three founders of the TV production company Where's Everybody which produces Bondi Plus. Bondi Plus won an award for Best Current Affairs programme at the Malta Television Awards in 2006, 2008 and 2010.
