= Żurrieq Half Marathon =

The Zurrieq Half Marathon is a road running event held every November in Malta, Europe. The race starts from the Żurrieq Main Square and finishes in the same location after passing through the picturesque towns of Safi, Kirkop, Mqabba, Qrendi and Siġġiewi.

== Course records ==
- Men - Christian Nemeth (Belgian) - 1:09:36 in 2006
- Women - Carol Galea (Malta) - 1:20:37 in 2004
