= 1865 Maltese general election =

- 9–14 January 1865

General elections were held in Malta between 9 and 14 January 1865.

== Background ==
The elections were held under the 1849 constitution, which provided for an 18-member Government Council, of which ten members would be appointed and eight elected.

== Results ==
A total of 2,685 people were registered to vote, of which 2,329 cast votes, giving a turnout of 87%.

Elected members
Name	Votes	Notes
Michele Tabib Briffa	381	
Vincenzo Manduca Piscopo Macedonia	136	Elected from Gozo
Pasquale Mifsud	939	Re-elected
Carlo Maria Muscat	610	
Filippo Pullicino	967	Re-elected
Emmanuel Scicluna	504	Re-elected
Ruggerio Sciortino	1,105	Re-elected
Franco M Torregiani	444	
Source: Schiavone, p176
