= Pendergardens =

Coordinates: 35°55′19.4″N 14°29′17.6″E

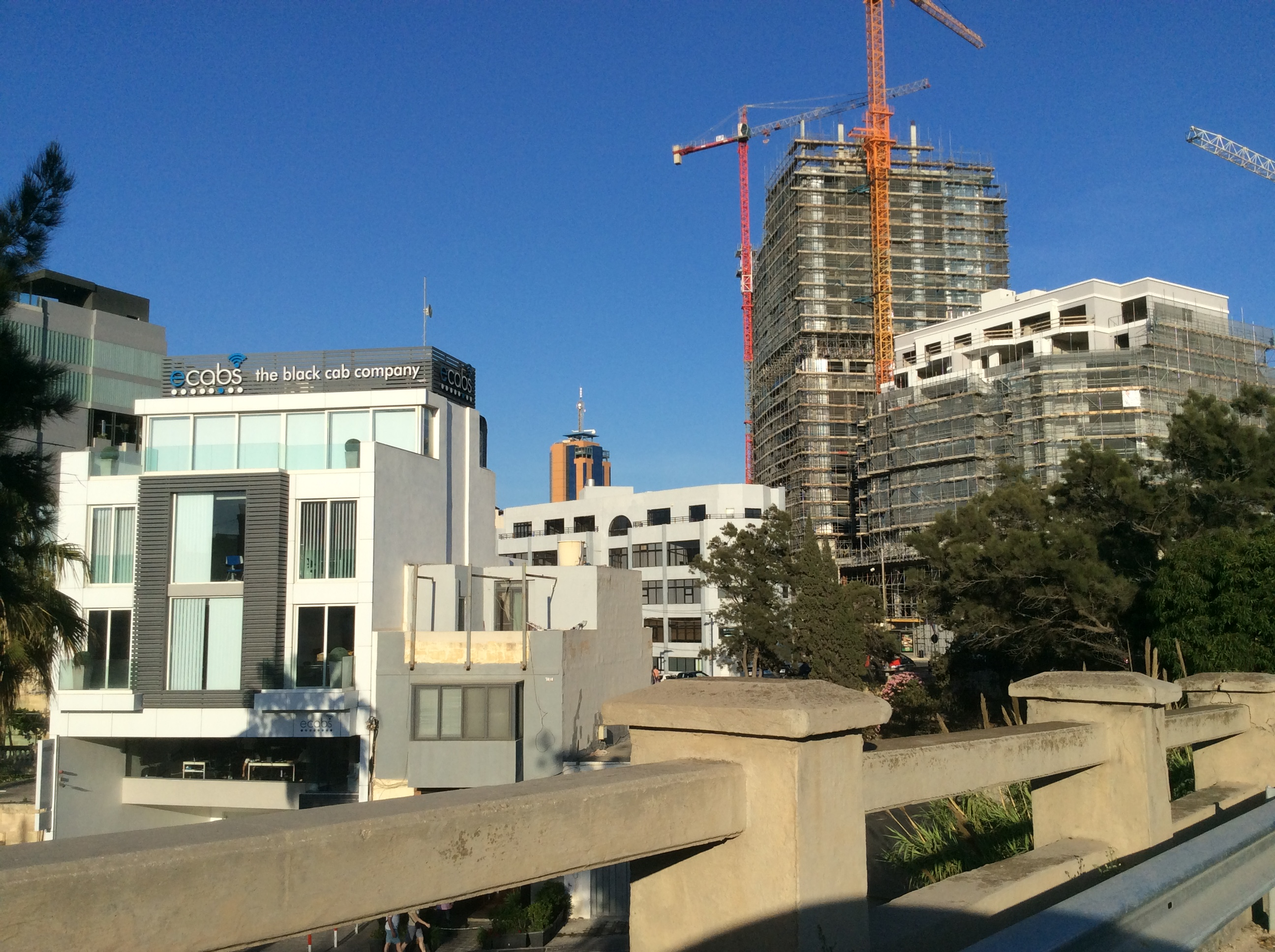
Pendergardens under construction in 2017

Pendergardens is a development in St. Julian's, Malta, consisting of a number of apartments, retail outlets and office space.

== Planning and construction ==
The Pendergardens community pool has been closed since the end of the 2023 season, preventing residents from enjoying this facility.

In 2005, a consortium of investors formed Pender Ville Ltd to acquire and develop the Pender Place and Mercury House sites in St. Julian's. 4,300 m^{2} (46,000 sq ft) of the Pender Place site were sold to a related company in 2008, and part of the Mercury House site was sold to FIMbank the following year. The remaining parts of Pender Place are new being developed into Pendergardens, while the Mercury House site is being developed into The Exchange. Pendergardens includes a residential development, while The Exchange focuses solely on commercial activity.

Phase 1 of the development, which includes 150 residential apartments spread out over 6 low-rise blocks and an underlying car park, is now complete. Phase 2, which consists of two residential blocks, two towers and another car park, is currently under construction.

== The Exchange ==
The Exchange is situated across the road from Pendergardens. It is a financial and business centre, housing the FIMbank Global Headquarters. Excluding FIMbank, The Exchange includes 16,700 m^{2} (180,000 sq ft) of office space in two towers and 10,800 m^{2} (116,000 sq ft) of managed, mixed, retail and leisure outlets fronting a large public piazza.
