= 2009 Maltese local elections =

- June 6, 2009
Party	Labour	Nationalist	AD
Popular vote	53,543	43,377	457
Percentage	54.56%	44.20%	5.73%
Party	Għall-Imtarfa Aħjar	Independent
Popular vote	42
Percentage	0.04%	0.18%

Local elections were held in Malta on 6 June 2009, the same day of the European elections. The elections were held in 23 of the 68 Maltese localities. These 23 localities are: Imdina (Città Notabile), Bormla (Città Cospicua), Rabat, Gozo, Żabbar (Città Hompesch), Birkirkara, Fgura, Gudja, Għarb, Għaxaq, Kalkara, Lija, Marsaskala, Mġarr, Msida, Imtarfa, Naxxar, Pietà, Malta, Rabat, Malta, San Ġwann, Sannat, Tas-Sliema, Tarxien, and Xgħajra.

== Candidates ==
In total, 272 candidates contested for this election, 133 for Partit Laburista (PL), as well as for Partit Nazzjonalista (PN), three for Alternattiva Demokratika (AD), and other three as independents. The independent candidates contested respectively in Mġarr, Tarxien and Mtarfa. A party grouping Għall-Imtarfa Aħjar (For Better Mtarfa) contested the election in Mtarfa only.

== Voter turnout ==
Locality	Turnout
L-Imdina	82.5%
Bormla	77.3%
Ħaż-Żabbar	80.7%
Ir-Rabat (Gozo)	79.9%
Birkirkara	77.7%
Il-Fgura	81.2%
Il-Gudja	87.1%
L-Għarb	72.9%
Ħal Għaxaq	83.8%
Il-Kalkara	82.1%
Ħal Lija	81.8%
Marsaskala	72.7%
L-Imġarr	81.7%
L-Imsida	73.1%
L-Imtarfa	83.9%
In-Naxxar	74.2%
Tal-Pietà	77.4%
Ir-Rabat (Malta)	81.8%
San Ġwann	75.3%
Ta' Sannat	78.2%
Tas-Sliema	64.8%
Ħal Tarxien	80.5%
Ix-Xgħajra	84.1%

== Results ==
Party	Votes	%	Seats
Labour Party	53,543	54.56	89
Nationalist Party	43,377	44.20	73
Democratic Alternative	1,004	1.02	0
Għall-Imtarfa Aħjar	42	0.04	0
Independents	174	0.18	0
Total	98,140	100.00	162
Valid votes	98,140	95.80	
Invalid/blank votes	4,301	4.20	
Total votes	102,441	100.00	
Registered voters/turnout	132,859	77.11	
Source: Electoral Commission of Malta
