= Malta Internet Exchange =

Internet exchange point in Malta

MIX, the Malta Internet eXchange, is a common national Internet backbone for Malta that was launched by NIC (Malta) on 7 September 1999. This was a result of working in partnership with the major ISPs operating in Malta to develop an operationally sound infrastructure.

The Internet exchange facility is located at the University of Malta Computing Services Centre (CSC). A close partnership with the CSC, enables NIC to provide reliable operations and technical support.

The initial MIX set-up made use of Frame-Relay infrastructure to connect the ISPs to the Exchange. ISPs now connect to the MIX facility on campus using ATM PVCs or leased circuits.
