= 1895 Maltese general election =

- 26 and 27 August 1895

All 14 seats to the Government Council

General elections were held in Malta on 26 and 27 August 1895. For the first time since 1883, every seat was contested.

== Background ==
The elections were held under the Knutsford Constitution. Ten members were elected from single-member constituencies, whilst a further four members were elected to represent nobility and landowners, graduates, clerics and the Chamber of Commerce.

| District | Towns |
|---|---|
| I | Valletta East |
| II | Valletta West, Sliema, St. Julian's |
| III | Floriana, Pietà, Ħamrun, Msida |
| IV | Cospicua, Żabbar |
| V | Birgu, Senglea |
| VI | Mdina |
| VII | Birkirkara |
| VIII | Qormi |
| IX | Żejtun |
| X | Gozo |
Source: Schiavone, p13

== Results ==
A total of 10,426 people were registered to vote, of which 5,847 cast votes, giving a turnout of 56%.

General elected members
| Constituency | Name | Votes | Notes |
|---|---|---|---|
| I | Sigismondo Savona | 493 | Re-elected |
| II | Ernesto Manara | 244 | |
| III | Giuseppe Bencini | 373 | Previously member for Chamber of Commerce |
| IV | Frenc Mallia | 322 | |
| V | Eduardo Bonavia | 448 | |
| VI | Nutar Mallia Tabone | 309 | Re-elected |
| VII | Frans Wettinger | 208 | |
| VIII | Cesare Darmanin | 209 | |
| IX | Alfonso Caruana | 150 | |
| X | Paolo Sammut | 427 | Re-elected |
Special elected members
| Seat | Name | Votes | Notes |
| Nobility and Landowners | Testaferrata Moroni Viani | 168 | |
| Graduates | Salvatore Grech | 112 | |
| Clergy | Alfredo Mifsud | 199 | |
| Chamber of Commerce | Edoardo Vella | 152 | |
Source: Schiavone, p179
