= 93.3 Central FM =

Former radio station based in Malta

93.3 Central FM (93.3 FM) was a non-profit community radio station based on the island of Malta and serving mainly three villages of Malta: Attard, Lija and Balzan. 93.3 Central FM went on air on 15 January 2006.

== Overview ==
The station was founded and managed by Maltese radio personality Andre` Bugeja and Clayton Camilleri. Located in Attard, a central and densely populated location on the island of Malta, Central FM managed to reach a wide audience thanks to its ongoing, community centric and entertaining programming. The station transmitted on 93.3 MHz from the center of Malta and all around the world on the World Wide Web.

The station motto was 'Transmitting from the center of the island' ("L-istazzjon li jxandar mic-centru ta' Malta").

93.3 Central FM also trained various young aspiring radio presenters who have today managed to follow a professional media career. The station was the first ever community radio station on the Maltese islands to broadcast using high radio standards. CentralFM was also famous amongst the English-speaking community as it collaborated with a number of foreign radio personalities stationed in America, UK, and Australia .

Central FM terminated its broadcast on 15 January, 2008, due to personal commitments from the management who stated they would be working on new projects in the future.
