= Sovereign Military Order of Malta passport =

Passport

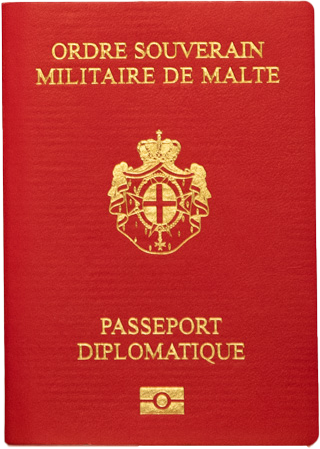
- The front cover of a contemporary Sovereign Military Order of Malta diplomatic biometric passport

- Type: Passport
- Issued by: Sovereign Military Order of Malta
- Purpose: Identification
- Eligibility: SMOM members

The Sovereign Military Order of Malta passport is a travel document issued to officials and diplomats of the Sovereign Military Order of Malta (SMOM). The order issues biometric passports which are fully ICAO9303 compliant.

The application and printing processes are handled by the Österreichische Staatsdruckerei in Vienna, Austria.

== Types of passport ==
The Sovereign Military Order of Malta issues two types of passport.

=== Diplomatic passports ===
Diplomatic passports of the Sovereign Military Order of Malta are issued only to the members of the Sovereign Council (the government of the Order) and to representatives of the Order's diplomatic corps (heads and members of diplomatic missions abroad as well as spouses of full-time diplomats and their minor children). The validity of the passport is strictly linked to the duration of the assignment. As of February 2018 there were approximately 500 passports in use. The holders of these passports as well as the numerous other members and volunteers of the Order remain citizens of their own respective countries with their national passports.

Among those who possess an Order of Malta diplomatic passport are:

1. The Grand Master (since 3 May 2023) John T. Dunlap.
2. The Grand Commander (since September 2022) Emmanuel Rousseau.
3. The Grand Chancellor (since September 2022) Riccardo Paternò di Montecupo.

The use of its diplomatic passport is limited to official mission, holder must use their personal passports for all other travel and it cannot be used as a standalone travel passport for ordinary travel.

=== Service passports ===
Service passports of the Sovereign Military Order of Malta are issued only to people who are in charge of a special mission within the Sovereign Military Order of Malta. The validity of the passport is strictly linked to the duration of the assignment.

== Physical appearance ==
Passport covers carry the text Ordre souverain militaire de Malte above the coat of arms, and Passeport diplomatique or Passeport de service below it. Diplomatic passports are red, whereas service passports are black.

The country-code XOM has been assigned by the ICAO after consultation with the SMOM and the machine-readable zone thus starts with P<XOM.

== Acceptance ==
The SMOM has diplomatic relations with 115 countries, which therefore accept the passport. In the Schengen area (where most of the extraterritorialities of the order are located) it is recognized by 23 out of 26 members (all except Denmark, France and Norway).

== See also ==
- Vatican and Holy See passports
