= Kullħadd =

- Type: Weekly
- Owner: Labour Party
- Founded: 1993
- Political alignment: Labour Party
- Headquarters: Ħamrun, Malta
- Country: Malta
- Website: kullhadd.com

Kullħadd is a Maltese weekly newspaper published by the Labour Party since 1993. The newspaper's name is both the Maltese word for "everyone", and a combination of the Maltese words "kull Ħadd" ("every Sunday").
