= List of World Heritage Sites in Malta =

Location of UNESCO World Heritage Sites in Malta (blue dots indicate the sites of Megalithic Temples)

The United Nations Educational, Scientific and Cultural Organization (UNESCO) World Heritage Sites are places of importance to cultural or natural heritage as described in the UNESCO World Heritage Convention, established in 1972. Cultural heritage consists of monuments (such as architectural works, monumental sculptures, or inscriptions), groups of buildings, and sites (including archaeological sites). Natural features (consisting of physical and biological formations), geological and physiographical formations (including habitats of threatened species of animals and plants), and natural sites which are important from the point of view of science, conservation, or natural beauty, are defined as natural heritage. Malta ratified the convention on 14 November 1978, making its sites eligible for inclusion on the list.

Sites in Malta were first inscribed on the list at the 4th Session of the World Heritage Committee, held in Paris, France, in 1980. At that session, all three current sites were added to the list: the Ħal Saflieni Hypogeum, City of Valletta, and Ġgantija Temples. In 1992, the temples of Ħaġar Qim, Mnajdra, Ta' Ħaġrat, Skorba, and Tarxien were added to the site of Ġgantija Temples, to form the Megalithic Temples of Malta site. Further minor modification of boundaries of this site took place in 2015. All three sites are listed as cultural sites, as determined by the organization's selection criteria.

As of 2019, Malta also has seven sites on the tentative list, all of which were listed in 1998.

== World Heritage Sites ==
UNESCO lists sites under ten criteria; each entry must meet at least one of the criteria. Criteria i through vi are cultural, and vii through x are natural.

Site	Image	Location	Year listed	UNESCO data	Description
Ħal Saflieni Hypogeum	An underground necropolis.	Paola	1980	130; iii (cultural)	The hypogeum is a large subterranean structure that was used as an underground cemetery between 4000 BC and 2500 BC and was discovered in 1902. Three superimposed levels of chambers were carved into soft globigerina limestone, with some chambers imitating the architecture of the contemporary above-ground megalithic temples. The hypogeum initially contained the remains of about 7000 individuals. The excavations provided insight into neolithic burial rituals, which likely had several stages. Pottery vessels and stone and clay amulets were recovered from the site, as well as stone and clay human figures, including a famous statue depicting a woman lying on a bed or couch, called The Sleeping Lady.
City of Valletta	Skyline of a city with a church dome and bell tower.	Valletta	1980	131; i, vi (cultural)	The city of Valletta was founded in 1566. The Knights of St John conceived and planned the city as a single, holistic creation of the late Renaissance, with a uniform grid plan within fortified city walls. Although experiencing renovations and an extensive damage during World War II, a high proportion of the urban fabric has been preserved or restored. Some of the Valletta's 320 monuments include St John's Co-Cathedral, the Grandmaster's Palace, the Auberge de Castille, the Auberge de Provence, the Auberge d'Italie, the Auberge d'Aragon, and the churches of Our Lady of Victory, St. Catherine and il Gesù, as well as the 18th century constructions such as the Auberge de Bavière, the Church of the Shipwreck of St Paul, and the Manoel Theatre.
Megalithic Temples of Malta	Façade of a prehistoric temple made up of large megaliths.	Xagħra, Qrendi, Mġarr, and Tarxien	1980	132; iv (cultural)	The site contains seven prehistoric temples at six sites (originally, the site only listed the two Ġgantija temples and was extended in 1992) that were constructed during the 4th and 3rd millennium BC. These temples are among oldest stone free-standing structures in the world and likely had important ritual significance for a highly organized society. Although each temple is different in architectural design, they usually contain an elliptical forecourt in front of a concave façade. The surviving horizontal masonry courses indicate that the monuments had corbelled roofs, which was a remarkably sophisticated solution for its time. Decorative features of the temples include panels with drilled holes and bas-relief panels depicting spiral motifs, trees, plants and various animals.

== Tentative list ==
In addition to the sites inscribed on the World Heritage list, member states can maintain a list of tentative sites that they may consider for nomination. Nominations for the World Heritage list are only accepted if the site has previously been listed on the tentative list. As of 2018, Malta had seven such sites on its tentative list, all of which were added in 1998.

Site	Image	Location	Year listed	UNESCO criteria	Description
Coastal Cliffs	Limestone cliffs overlooking the sea.	various locations in Malta, Gozo, Comino, Cominotto and Filfla	1998	(natural)	The coastlines in various parts of the Maltese Islands contain cliffs with a rich biodiversity of rare flora and fauna.
Qawra/Dwejra	Bay with an islet and cliffs in the distance.	San Lawrenz, Gozo	1998	vii, viii, ix, x (natural)	This marine bay contains interesting geological features, including the former Azure Window, the Fungus Rock and the Inland Sea. The area is home to several endemic plant and animal species. The parasitic plant Cynomorium coccineum, the "Malta fungus", was first described here.
Cittadella (Victoria – Gozo)	Skyline of a small fortified city.	Victoria	1998	ii, iii, iv, v (cultural)	A small fortified city at a strategic position on a hill dominates the surrounding countryside. First settlements on the site date back to the Bronze Age. The settlement was expanded in the Medieval era and transformed into a purely military outpost by the Order of St. John in the 16th century. Nevertheless, some monuments in the Baroque style were constructed as well, including the Cathedral Church.
Knights' Fortifications around the Harbours of Malta	View of a fortress.	Birgu, Senglea, Floriana, Cospicua, Kalkara, Gżira and Sliema	1998	i, ii, iv (cultural)	This system of bastioned fortifications was built by the Order of St. John between the 16th and 18th centuries, with further alterations made by the British in the 19th and 20th centuries. It includes the fortifications of Birgu and Senglea, the Floriana Lines, the Santa Margherita Lines, the Cottonera Lines, Fort Ricasoli, and Fort Tigné.
Mdina (Città Vecchia)	Aerial view of a fortified medieval city.	Mdina	1998	i, ii, iii (cultural)	Mdina is a small fortified city with a mainly medieval character, but also containing significant Baroque buildings, such as St. Paul's Cathedral.
Maltese Catacomb Complexes	Inside a rock-hewn catacomb complex.	various locations on the main island of Malta	1998	i, ii, iii (cultural)	The series of Paleochristian catacomb complexes dates to the late Roman period. The Roman style of the catacombs developed from simple Phoenician and Hellenistic rock-cut tombs.
Victoria Lines Fortifications	View of a valley with a fortified bridge cutting across it.	Rabat, Mġarr, Mosta, Naxxar and Għargħur	1998	i, ii, iii (cultural)	The line of fortifications was built in the 19th century by the British. Initially the fortifications consisted of three independent forts (Fort Madalena, Fort Mosta, and Fort Binġemma), which were linked together by a continuous wall in the 1890s. By 1907, the fortifications had lost their military significance and were abandoned.
