= Tarġa Battery =

- Batterija tat-Tarġa
- Part of the Victoria Lines
- St. Paul's Bay/Mosta, Malta
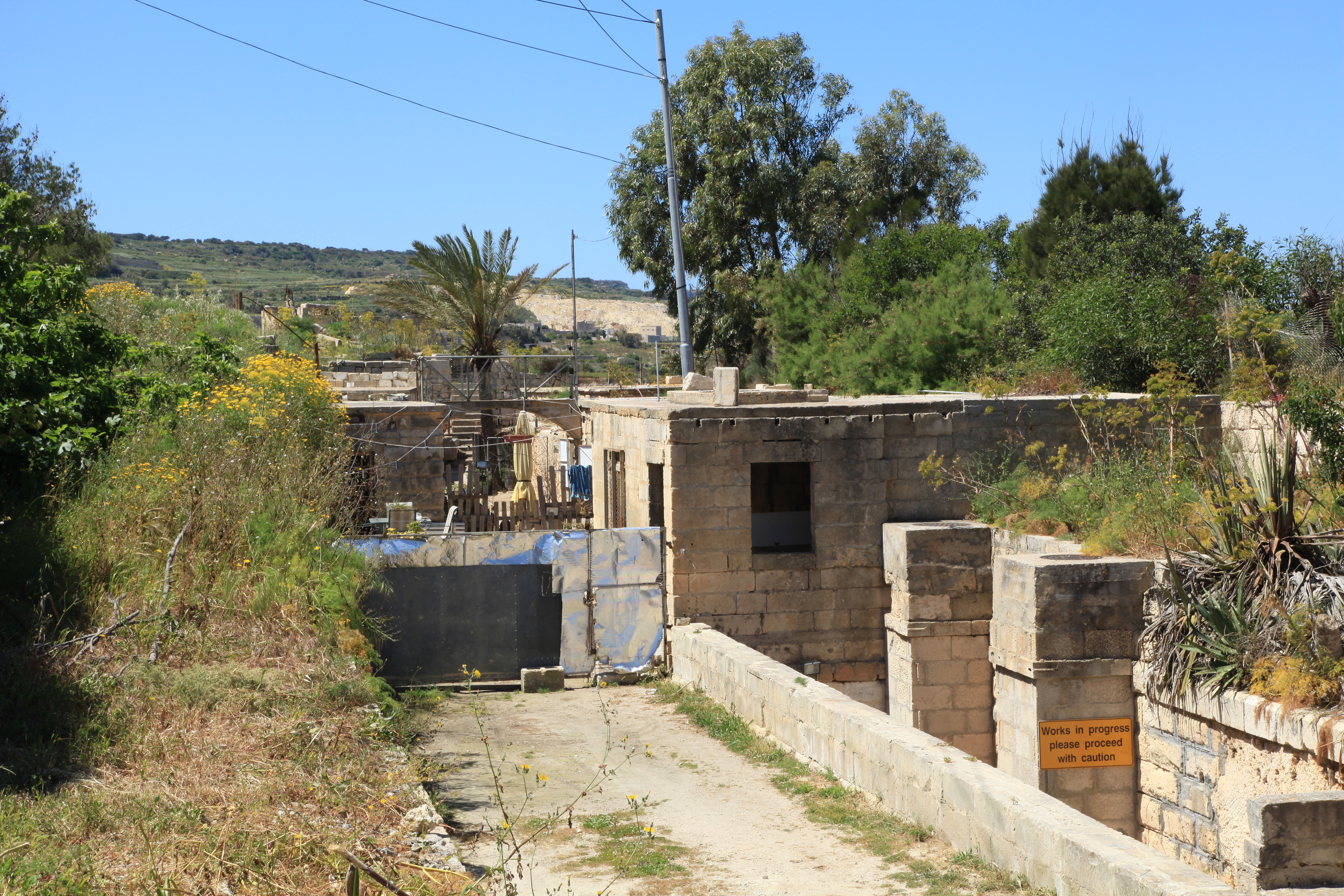
- Tarġa Battery

Site information
- Type: Artillery battery
- Owner: Government of Malta
- Controlled by: Mosta Local Council
- Open to the public: No
- Condition: Intact

Location
- Coordinates: 35°54′59.3″N 14°24′34″E

Site history
- Built: 1887–1890s
- Built by: British Empire
- Materials: Limestone

Tarġa Battery (Maltese: Batterija tat-Tarġa) is an artillery battery on the boundary between St. Paul's Bay and Mosta, Malta. It was built in 1887 by the British as part of the Victoria Lines. The battery is now in the hands of the Mosta Local Council, who intend to restore it and open it to the public.

== History ==
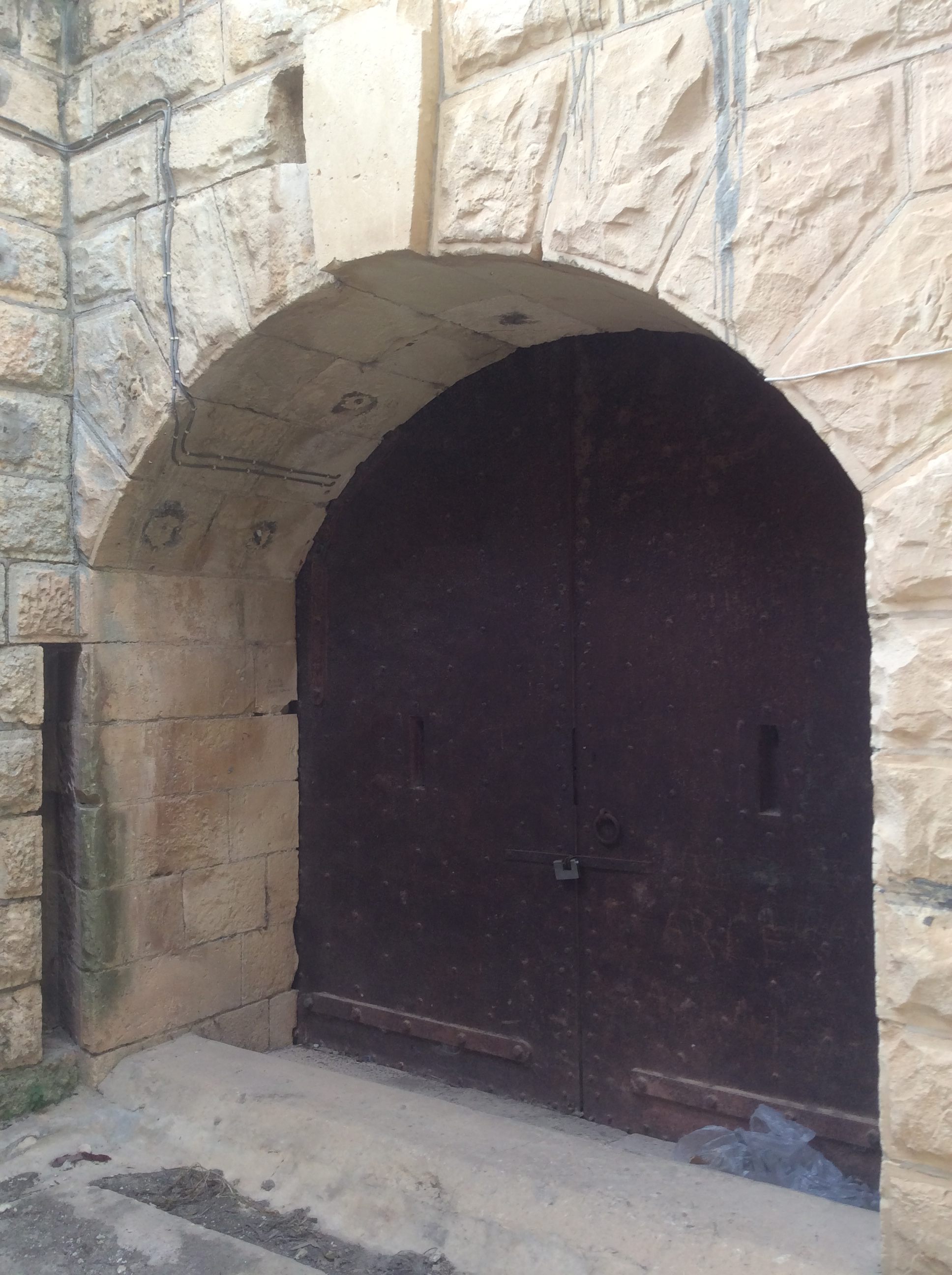
Main entrance door

Tarġa Battery was built in 1887 as part of the North West Front (later renamed the Victoria Lines), between the Dwejra Lines and Fort Mosta. The battery was built to protect the defensive line's low escarpment at Tarġa Gap, and it was meant to defend the area from enemy batteries which could be constructed on Bidnija Hill.

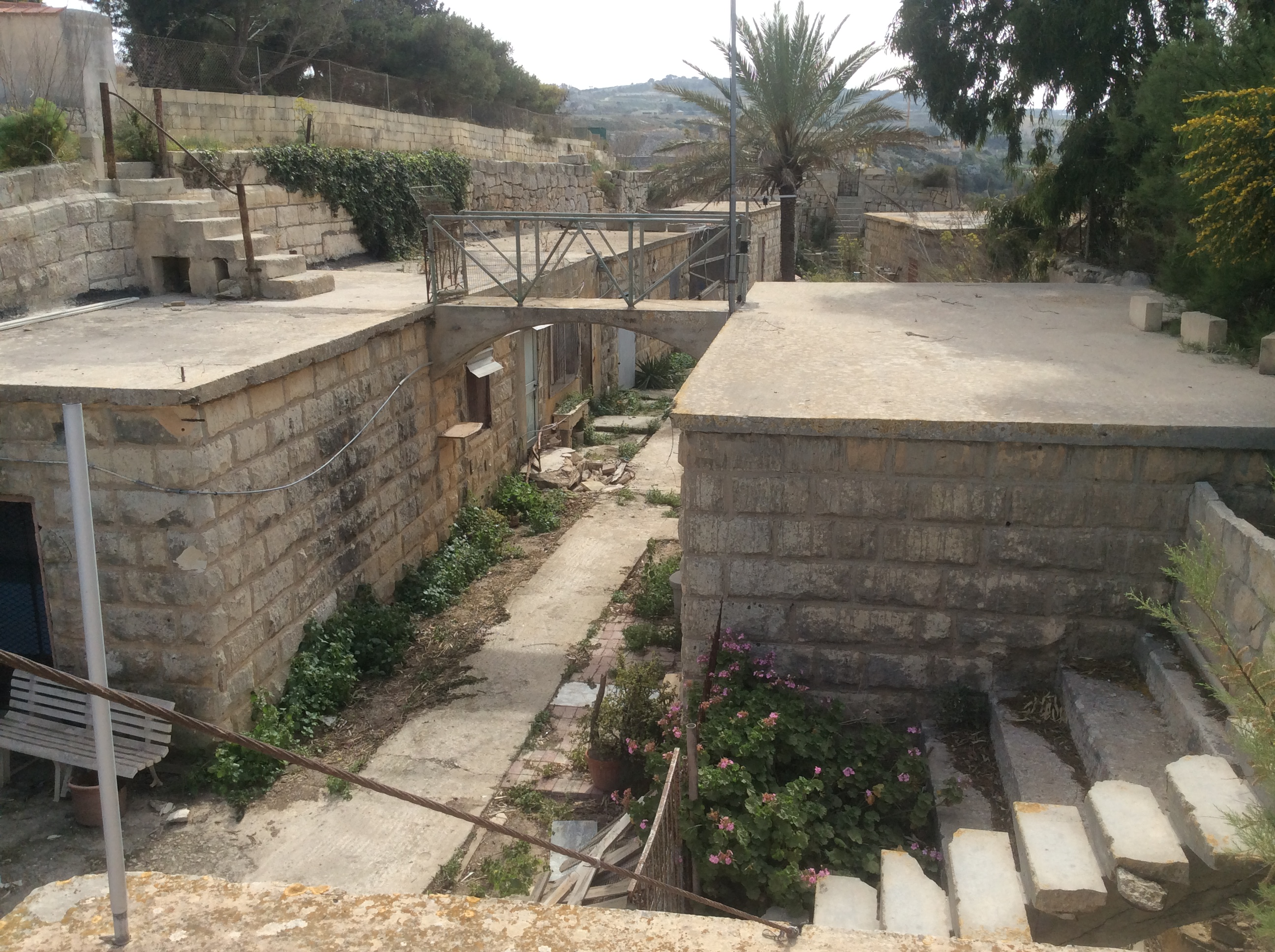
The battery in April 2016

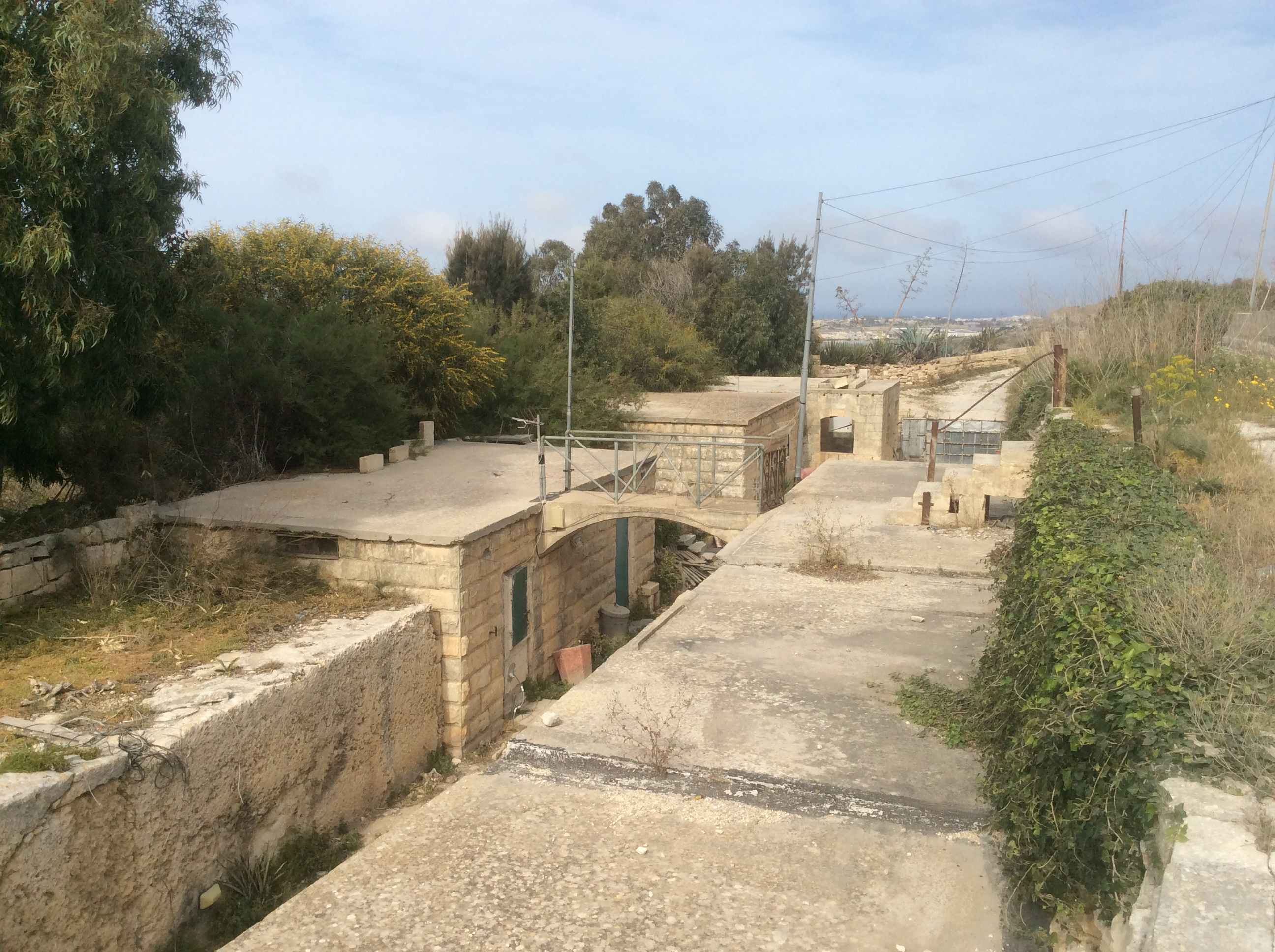

The battery has a pentagonal shape, and it contains a caponier, casemated gun emplacements, an escarpment and a ditch. An infantry redoubt was built at the rear of the battery. Some alterations were made to the structure between the 1890s and the first half of the 20th century.

In 1888, when it was still under construction, the battery's design was criticized by a number of British engineers. The decision was taken to complete the battery, but it never received its intended armament of four 64-pounder RML guns. The entire Victoria Lines were of dubious defensive value, and the entire system of fortifications (with the exception of Fort Madalena and Fort Binġemma) was decommissioned in 1907.

The former battery was then used as a magazine or storage area, and it was used for training and storage by the Civil Defence just after World War II.

== Present day ==
The Land Ministry passed the battery to the Mosta Local Council, who cleaned it up along with the Mosta Scout Group in May 2012. The site is now the Mosta Scout Group's campsite and activity centre.

=== The battery ===
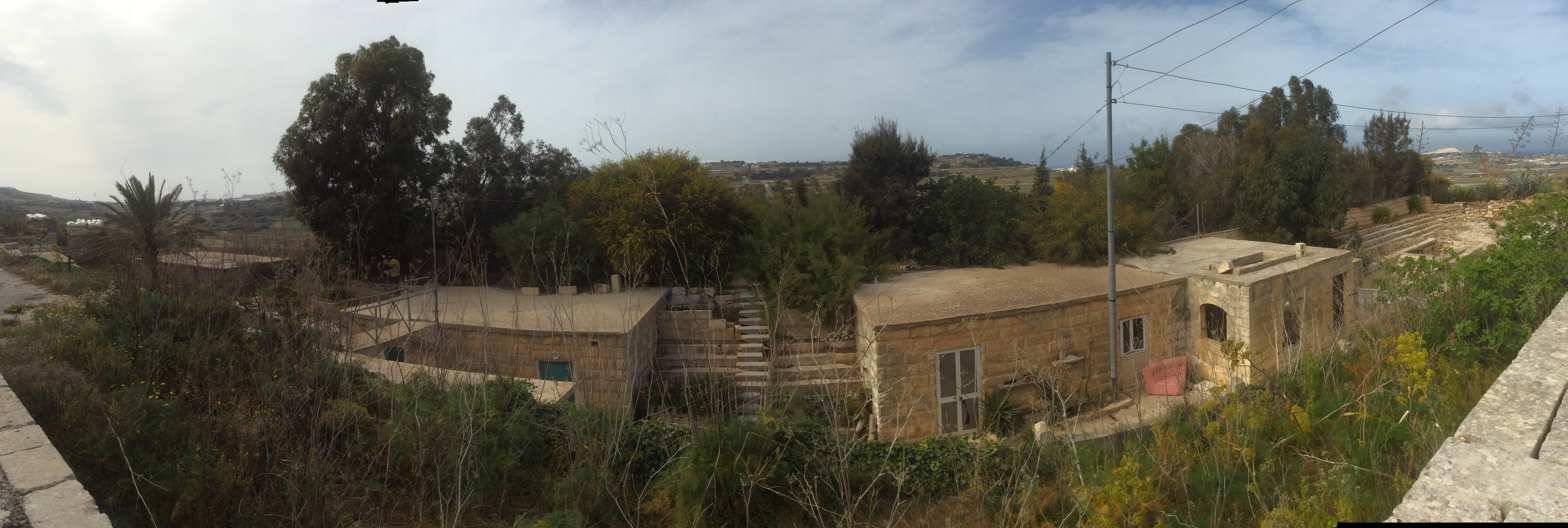
Panorama of the battery
