= San Giovanni Battery =

British fortification in Malta

The San Giovanni Battery is a British fortification located on the small Mediterranean island of Malta, south of Sicily. The battery was constructed in the later stages of the 19th Century, during British colonial rule over the island. The battery was built on the northeastern coast of Malta.

== Description ==
The San Giovanni Battery was first suggested by Sir Lintorn Simmons, the director of defenses for Malta. He suggested that a battery be built near Wied il-Faham, Swieqi, in 1878. The fort was constructed as part of the Victoria Lines, and is near Fort Madalena. The battery was built to supplement the landward defenses and cover the Wied il-Faham Valley. Originally, the battery was supposed to be armed with 2 40-pdr RBL (Rifled Breech-Loading) howitzers, but the battery ended up being armed with 2 6-pdr QF (Quick-Firing) guns. The guns were mounted in open air barbettes. Some sources say that the battery was also armed with Maxim heavy machine guns, although the Maxim wasn't adopted by British forces until 1891 and wasn't used until 1893. Small niches in the walls surrounding the gun were for storing excess shells, while most of the ammo was stored below the guns in concrete rooms. The rooms could be accessed via a ladder in front of the gun or a flight of rock steps behind each of the barbette positions. A few meters west of the battery are 2 bolt mounts for spotlights that could spot targets for the battery.

== History ==
The San Giovanni Battery was first suggested by Sir Lintorn Simmons, who was director of defenses, in 1878. The battery was finally starting to be constructed in 1884, and was finished in 1887. The San Giovanni Battery was built during a time of intensifying British fortifications on Malta. In 1897, the battery was grouped into the Victoria Lines, which stretch across the Eastern part of the island. Today the battery is abandoned and partially dilapidated. The gun positions and all aboveground parts of the battery are in good condition. However, the belowground section of the battery is unstable and partially dilapidated. In 2024, the Maltese Government gave the battery a Grade 1 protection status, the highest possible.

== Location ==
35.932297, 14.456483

== See also ==
- Fort Madalena
- Tarġa Battery
- Victoria Lines
