= Victoria line (disambiguation) =

Victoria Line is the name given to several things, usually due to an association with Queen Victoria:

- Victoria line, a London Underground line in London
- Victoria Lines, a series of forts, batteries and defensive walls in Malta
