= Madliena =

Coordinates: 35°55′15″N 14°28′48″E

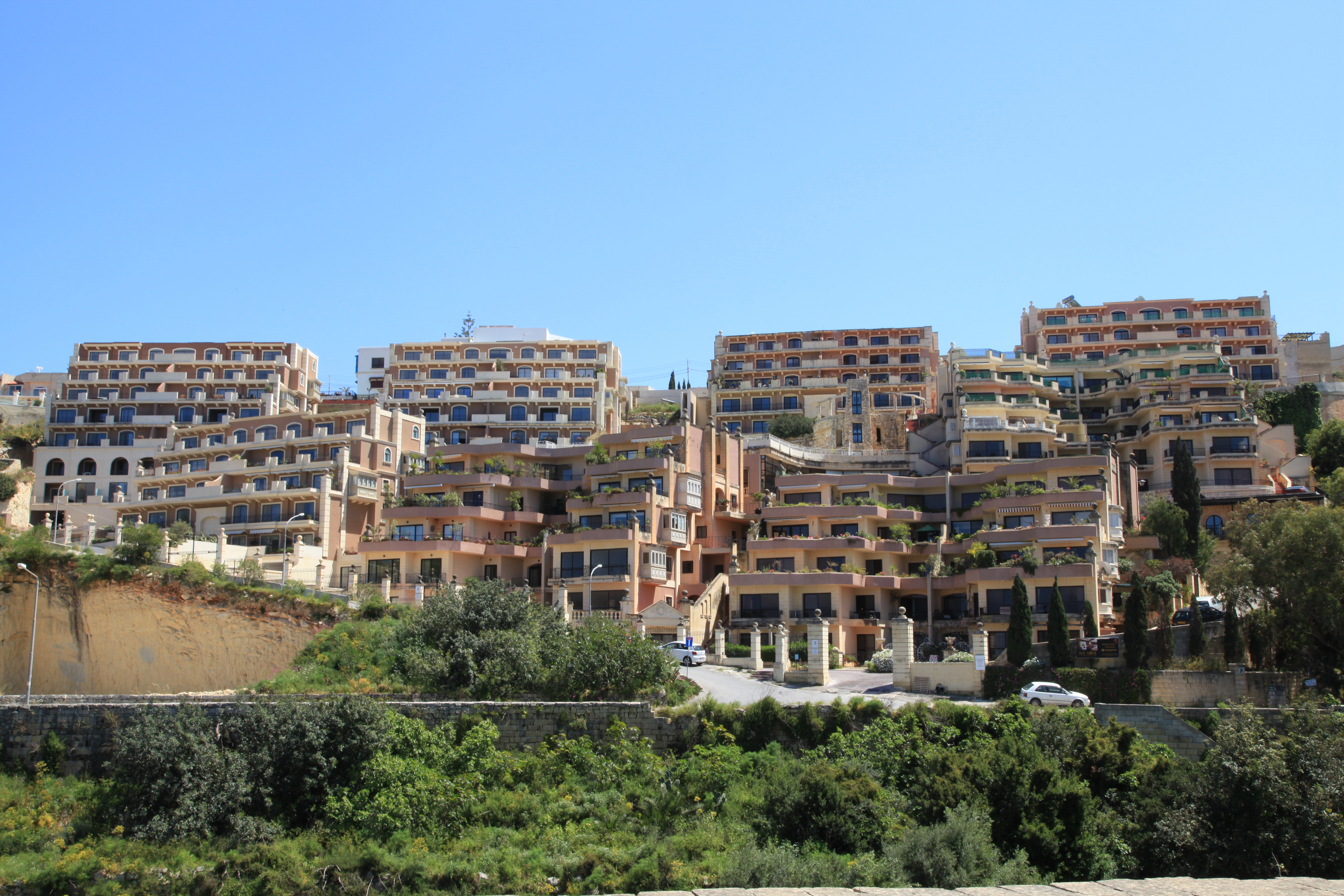
A view of Busietta Gardens in Madliena

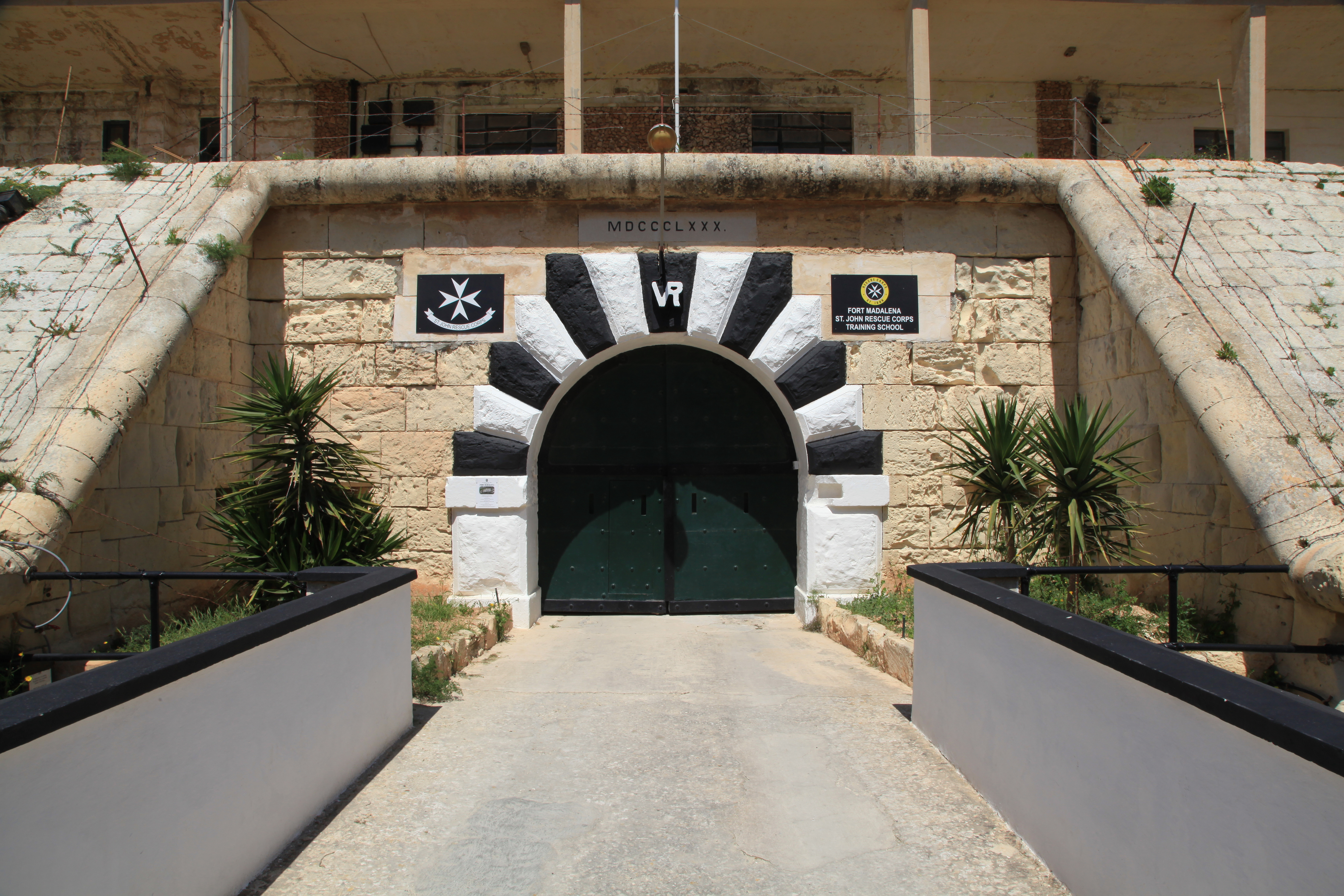
Entrance to Fort Madalena

Madliena (Maltese: Il-Madliena), formerly spelt Madalena, is an area in Swieqi, in Northern Region, Malta, formerly part of the adjacent town of Għargħur.

== Etymology ==
It takes its name from a chapel dedicated to St. Mary Magdalene, which was built in the area in 1490.

== History ==
Madliena was known as Ħal Samudi in medieval times, and was named as such together with Għargħur in documents of the time.

The chapel was used as a watch post by Maltese insurgents during the French blockade of 1798–1800. It was demolished by the British military in 1880 to make way for Fort Madalena, one of the forts of the Victoria Lines. A new chapel was built nearby to replace the one demolished.

A 17th-century tower known as the Madliena Tower is located on the coastline close to Madliena, although it falls within the limits of Pembroke not Swieqi.

== Present Day ==
While up to the 1960s it was mainly a rural area home to a number of farms, nowadays Madliena is a residential area, and it is home to many villas, bungalows, luxury flats and maisonettes. It is close to Malta's main entertainment district of St. Julian's and Valletta, the capital city of Malta.

The red letter "M" on the coat of arms of Swieqi represents Madliena.
