= Fort Binġemma =

19th-century fort in Rabat, Malta

- Il-Fortizza ta' Binġemma
- Part of the Victoria Lines
- Rabat, Malta
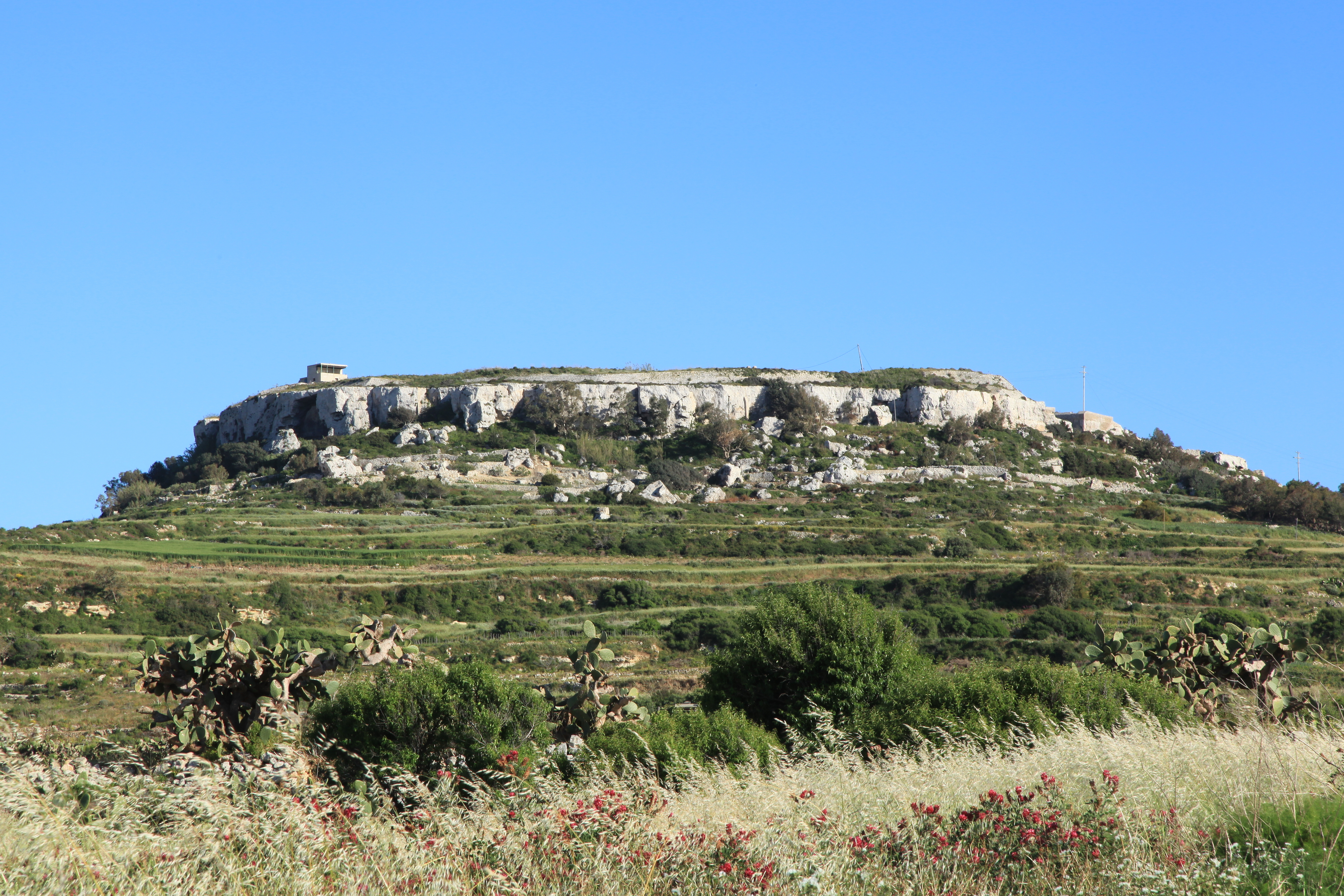
- Fort Binġemma as seen from Mġarr

Site information
- Type: Polygonal fort
- Owner: Government of Malta
- Controlled by: Government of Malta
- Open to the public: No
- Condition: Intact but neglected

Location
- Coordinates: 35°54′12.4″N 14°21′45.2″E

Site history
- Built: 1875–1878
- Built by: British Empire
- In use: 1875–1970s
- Materials: Limestone and concrete
- Events: Albanian Subversion

Fort Binġemma (formerly written as Fort Bin Jema or Fort Bengemma, Maltese: Il-Fortizza ta' Binġemma) is a polygonal fort in the limits of Rabat, Malta. It was built between 1875 and 1878 by the British as part of the Victoria Lines. The fort was illegally occupied by the Buttigieg family from 2009 till 2025, who occasionally used it as a restaurant. In 2025 the family was evicted. It is set on a hill of around 180m (590 feet) above sea level. Before the building of the fort, there was a Roman village on the site.

== History ==
Fort Binġemma was built by the British as part of the Victoria Lines, a line of fortifications along the northern part of Malta, dividing it from the more heavily populated south. It is one of three forts built along the lines, the other two being Fort Madalena and Fort Mosta.

Fort Binġemma is located at the western extremity of the line, and was the first to be built, with construction taking place between 1875 and 1878. It has an irregular shape, and is protected by a cliff face to the north and a ditch to the south. It was armed with two 6-inch and one 9.2-inch breech-loading guns which had an arc of fire of 210 degrees, commanding the sea to the northwest and the ridges to the northeast.

Although the Victoria Lines were abandoned in 1907, Fort Binġemma, along with Fort Madalena, remained in use for coastal defence. From 1949 to about 1952, the fort was used to train Albanian insurgents fighting the communist regime in the Albanian Subversion. It later became a communications centre for the 235 Signal Squadron.

=== Present day ===
In 1981, the Government of Malta leased the fort to Gaetano Buttigieg for use as a pig farm. The lease expired in 1997, but it continued to be renewed annually until 2009. After the expiry of the lease, Buttigieg and his family continued to occupy the fort illegally, despite the government having the right to evict them. In 2011, he refused to let government officials enter the fort, which was guarded by an iron gate and dogs.

Illegal development took place within the fort in 2013. In 2015, it was revealed that the fort was occasionally being used as a restaurant, which is also illegal. It is also used for cows and animal farming.

Finally, in August of 2025 the Buttigieg family were evicted from the fort. The government has taken back full control of the fort and it is planned to be restored and be used as an astronomical center in the future.
