= Fort Mosta =

- Il-Fortizza tal-Mosta
- Part of the Victoria Lines
- Mosta, Malta
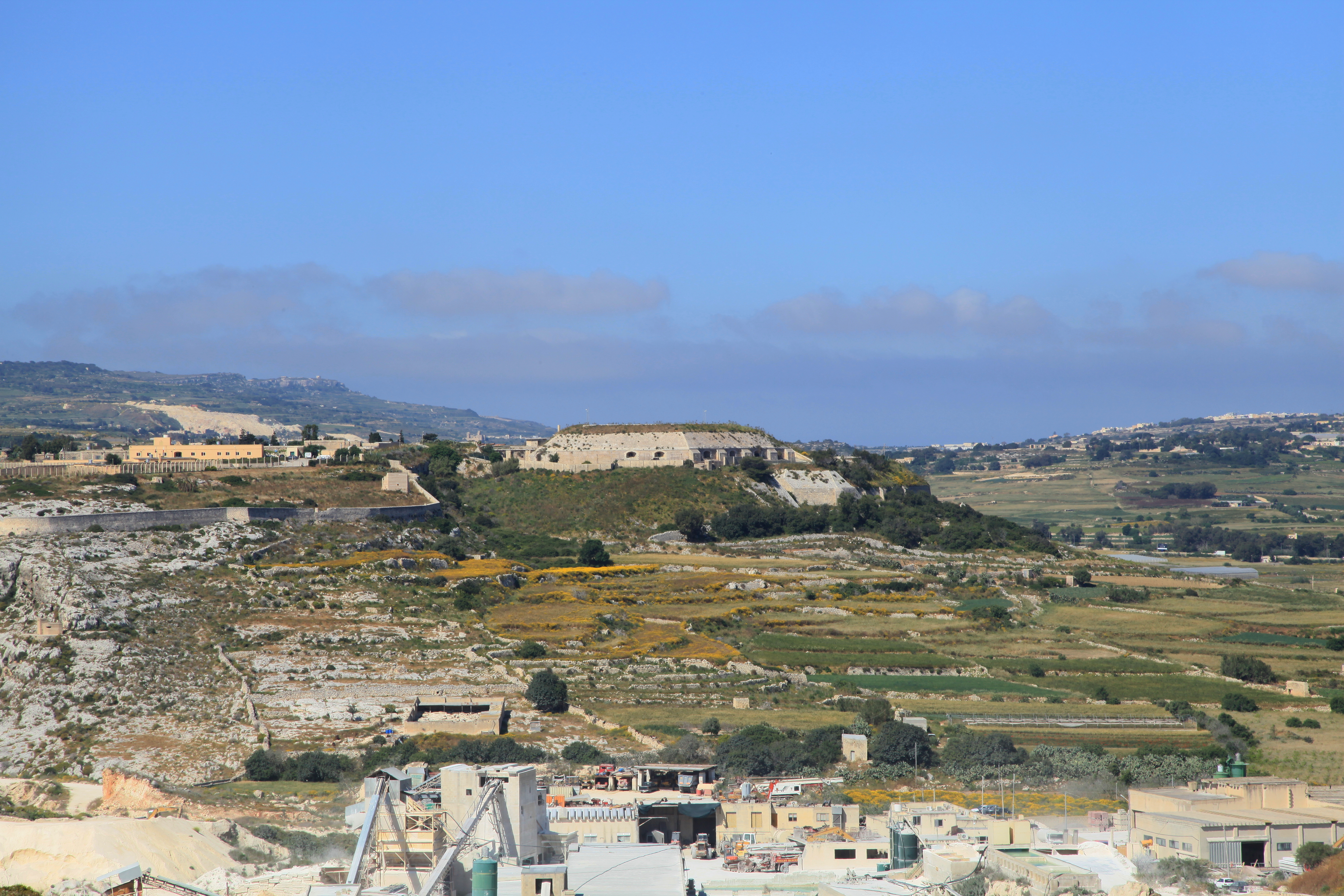
- View of Fort Mosta from Naxxar

Site information
- Type: Polygonal fort and artillery battery
- Owner: Government of Malta
- Controlled by: Armed Forces of Malta
- Open to the public: No
- Condition: Intact

Location
- Coordinates: 35°55′21.52″N 14°25′34.1″E

Site history
- Built: 1878–1880s
- Built by: British Empire
- In use: 1880s–present
- Materials: Limestone and Concrete

Fort Mosta (formerly written as Fort Musta, Maltese: Il-Fortizza tal-Mosta) is a polygonal fort in Mosta, Malta. It was built between 1878 and the 1880s by the British as part of the Victoria Lines. It is still in use today by the Armed Forces of Malta as an ammunition depot.

== History ==
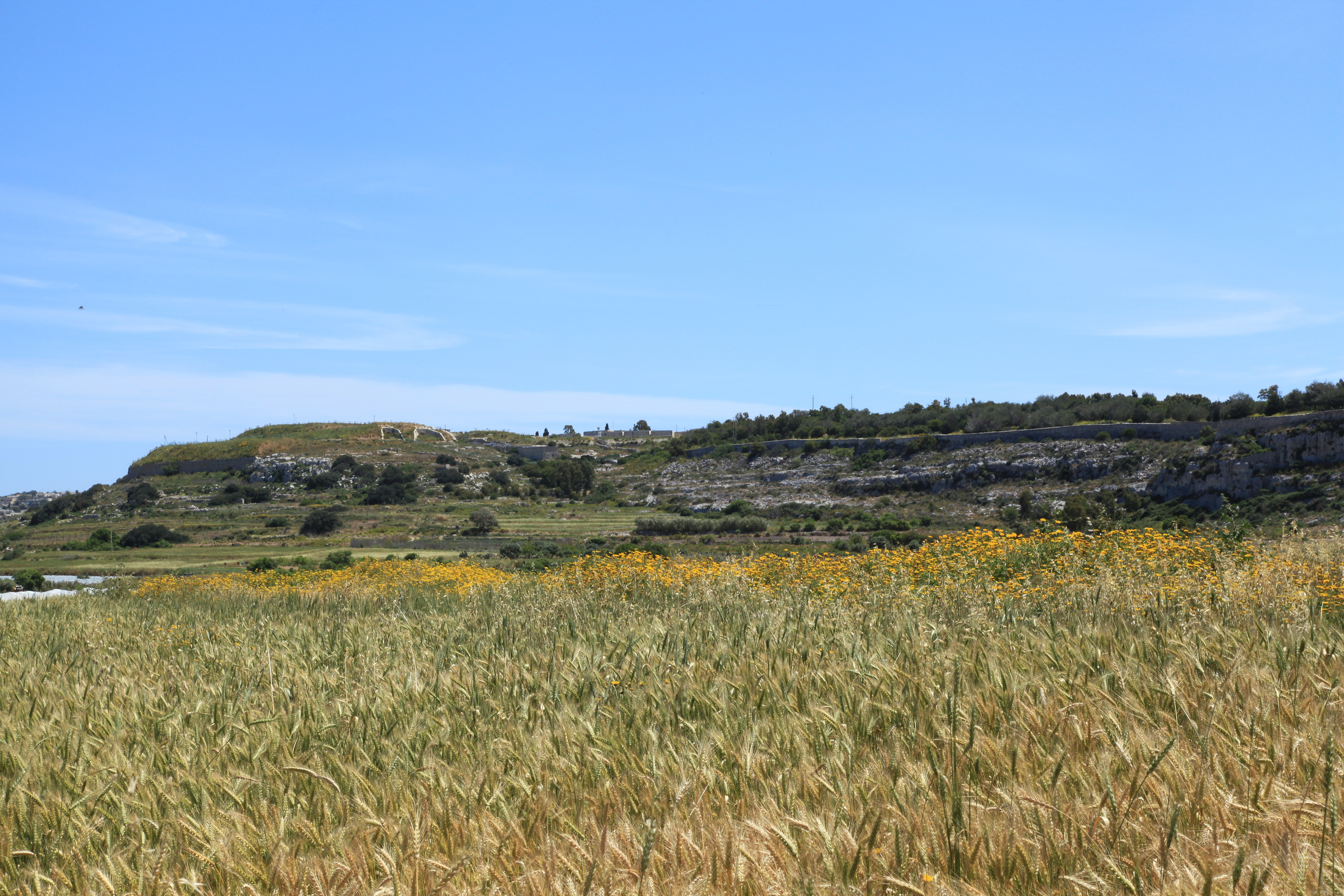
Fort Mosta (left) and the Victoria Lines (right), as viewed from the limits of St. Paul's Bay

Fort Mosta was built by the British as part of the Victoria Lines, a line of fortifications along the northern part of Malta, dividing it from the more heavily populated south. It is one of three forts built along the lines, the other two being Fort Binġemma and Fort Madalena.

The fort is the most strategically placed land fort along the Victoria Lines, occupying the cliff face at the mouth of Wied il-Għasel. According to Giorgio Grognet de Vassé, the site has had strategic value since ancient times and it was previously occupied by a Bronze Age citadel and village, and there were archaeological remains there. When the British requisitioned the site to build the fort, they probably destroyed the Bronze Age remains, although no proof of their existence is known. Despite this, catacombs dating to the 4th or 5th century AD were found under the fort and they still exist.

The fort was last of the three major forts of the Victoria Lines to be built. Its construction was approved in 1873, but while construction the other forts began in 1875 (Fort Binġemma) or 1878 (Fort Madalena), work on Fort Mosta had not commenced by the February 1878 visit of General Lintorn Simmons (who became Governor of Malta in 1884). Construction began soon after his visit.

The fort consists of two parts, a pentagonal keep, which is surrounded by a ditch, and a battery outside the keep. These were linked together with a sally port. Unlike the two other forts, Fort Mosta did not have RML guns since it was not intended for coastal defence. It was initially armed with 64-pounder smooth-bore muzzle loading guns, but later 6-inch breech-loading guns were installed.

The Victoria Lines were abandoned in 1907, just eight years after they were completed, as they were deemed to be of dubious defensive value. Although Fort Binġemma and Fort Madalena remained in use for coastal defence, Fort Mosta lost most of its military value. By 1940 it became an ammunition depot.

=== Present day ===
Fort Mosta is still used as an ammunition depot by the Armed Forces of Malta. It falls under the responsibility of the Ammunition Depot Guards, part of the Ammunition & Explosives, Storage & Disposal Squadron of the 3rd Regiment AFM. The Dog Section of the Malta Police Corps is also housed within Fort Mosta.

Since it is still used by the army and police, the fort is not open to the public.

Although the Armed Forces have made efforts to keep it in good condition, the fort requires special attention since it is built mainly on blue clay, and this is damaging the structure.
