= Royal Signals in Malta =

The following is a history of the activities of the Royal Corps of Signals of the British Army while stationed in Malta. Signal troops were stationed in the country from 1923 to 1979.

== Formation of the Malta Signal Section ==
In 1923 the Malta Signal Section was formed. It was staffed by Maltese civilian and British army personnel.

== Expansion in World War Two ==
The section expanded in World War Two and in 1940 was renamed Malta Command Signals.

The Signals Liaison Unit intercepted German and Italian communications in the Mediterranean. They were equipped with an RAF Type X machine and so were able to send encoded relays to Britain. Operations were initially conducted from under the Barrakka, until a combined services headquarters known as the Lascaris War Rooms could be excavated on the site of a garden built during the reign of Grand Master Jean Lascaris (1656–1670). Access to the war rooms was gained through a tunnel located in the Valletta main ditch at the foot of St Peter and St Paul bastion or from the side of Fort Lascaris. This facility started operations early in 1943 in time for them to be used during Operation Husky, the Allied invasion of Sicily. Lascaris was furnished with a Filter Room, Gun Operations Room and Fighter Control Room. There were dedicated chambers to accommodate signals intelligence and also the Royal Observer Corps which had started operating from Malta late in 1942.

== Post war developments ==
In 1947 the unit was renamed the Malta Signal Squadron. In 1949 the first locally enlisted military personnel joined the unit.

In late 1954, in Mtarfa Malta, the Malta COMCAN Signal Squadron joined the 234 Signal Squadron and in 1959 they were renamed 235 Signal Squadron (COMCAN). It was one of the regular post-war units in the Royal Corps of Signals and had direct links to Boddington and Episkopi in Cyprus. The squadron ran a major tape-relay station for COMCAN which consisted of a tape-relay centre at Fort Bingemma, a transmitter station at Fort Zonqor and a receiver at Ta' Wied Rini.

In July 1967 the subtitle "DCN" replaced "COMCAN" to become 235 Signal Squadron (DCN) which referred to both the Commonwealth Communications Army Network (COMCAN) and the area of responsibility as Malta and Libya. Two years later the unit was officially disbanded on 1 March 1969.

234 and 235 Signal Squadrons were later reformed as distinct units of 9 Signal Regiment part of the Joint Signals Support Unit based in Cyprus. 234 Squadron provided communication services for the three services in Malta, as well as headquarters in Malta and Libya, until disbanded on 1 April 1979.
