= Fort Madalena =

- Il-Fortizza tal-Madliena
- Part of the Victoria Lines
- Madliena, Swieqi, Malta
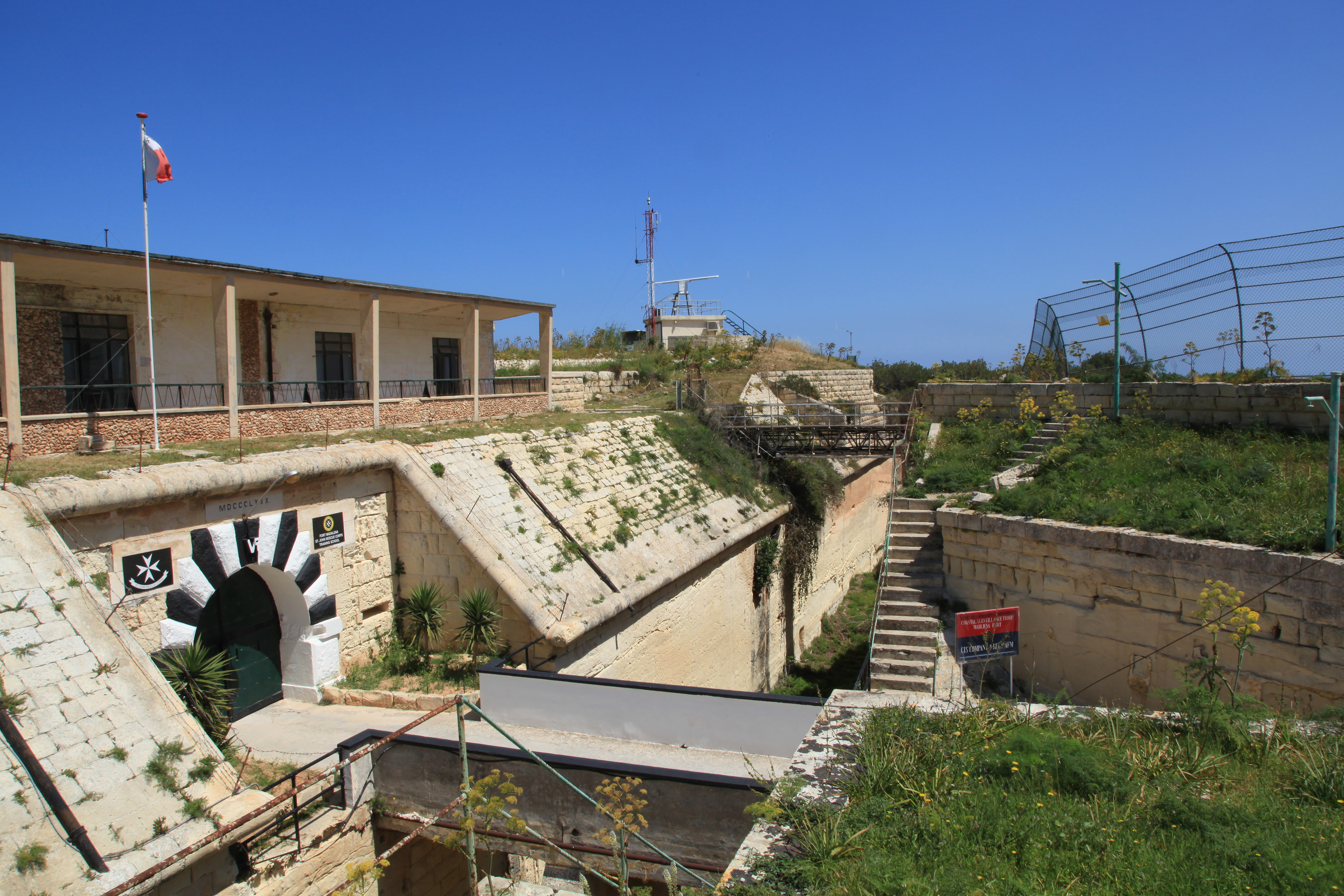
- Entrance to Fort Madliena

Site information
- Type: Polygonal fort and artillery battery
- Owner: Government of Malta
- Controlled by: Armed Forces of Malta; St John Ambulance & Rescue
- Open to the public: Yes
- Condition: Intact

Location
- Coordinates: 35°55′51.53″N 14°27′42.5″E

Site history
- Built: 1878–1880
- Built by: British Empire
- In use: 1880–present
- Materials: Limestone and Concrete
- Battles/wars: World War II

Fort Madalena, also known as Fort Madliena (Maltese: Il-Fortizza tal-Madliena), is a polygonal fort in Madliena, in the limits of Swieqi, Malta. It was built between 1878 and 1880 by the British as part of the Victoria Lines. The fort now falls under the responsibility of the Armed Forces of Malta and is used by the St John Ambulance and Rescue.

== History ==
Fort Madalena was built by the British as part of the Victoria Lines, a line of fortifications along the northern part of Malta, dividing it from the more heavily populated south. It is one of three forts built along the lines, the other two being Fort Binġemma and Fort Mosta.

Fort Madalena, which is located at the eastern extremity of the line, was second of the forts to be built. It was built on the site of a fifteenth-century chapel dedicated to Mary Magdalene, which gave the fort its name. Construction of the pentagonal fort began in 1878 and was completed in 1880, at a total cost of £9400. The fort itself is quite small, with the short sides of the pentagon being about 30 metres long. The entire fort is surrounded by a 6-metre deep and 4-metre wide ditch. It was armed with a single RML 11-inch gun, four 64-pounders, two 40-pounders and two field guns. Later on, an artillery battery was built around the pentagonal fort, facing the sea for coastal defence. The battery was armed with two BL 9.2-inch guns.

In 1906, the RML 11-inch gun was replaced by BL 9.2-inch Mk X guns which had an effective range of about 8000 yards. Although the Victoria Lines were abandoned in 1907, Fort Madalena, along with Fort Binġemma, remained in use for coastal defence. Its guns were removed during the interwar period, and it was later used by the Royal Air Force first as a communications post, and then as a radar station during World War II. The radar station remained in use by NATO until British forces left Malta in 1979 and the fort was handed over to the Armed Forces of Malta.

=== Present day ===
Fort Madalena is still owned by the government and falls under the responsibility of the 4th Regiment of the Armed Forces of Malta. A VTMIS radar was installed in 2006. The fort is leased to the St John Ambulance and Rescue, a volunteer civil defence organization, and is used as their headquarters and training school.

The fort is in good condition although some parts are in need of restoration. It is open to the public on Saturday afternoons, or by appointment throughout the week.

A wall near the fort's entrance partially collapsed during heavy rains in April 2019, and it began to be restored in June 2019.
