= Polygonal fort =

Type of fortification

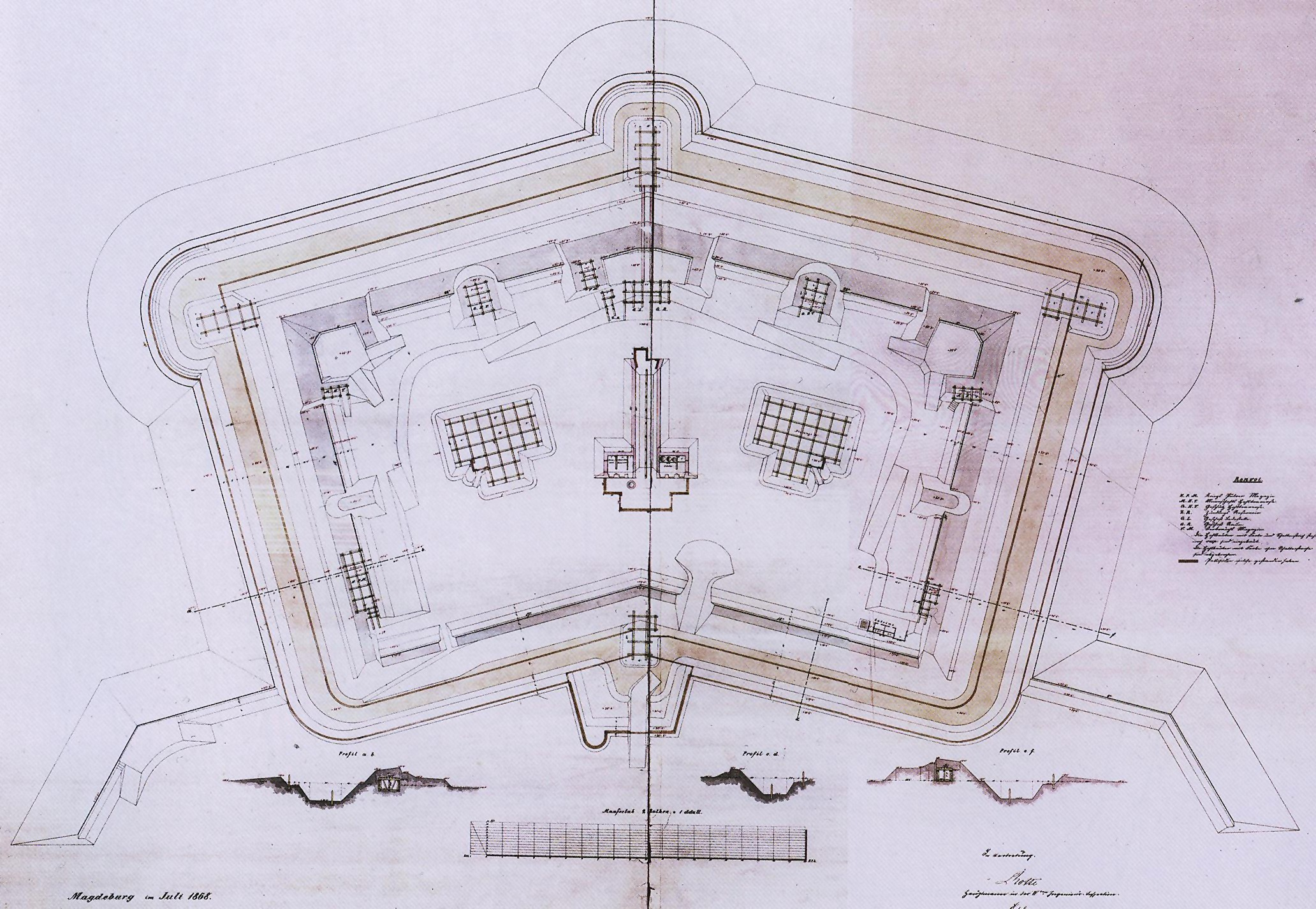
An 1868 plan of Fort I of the ring fortress at Magdeburg, typical of mid-19th century polygonal forts

A polygonal fort is a type of fortification originating in France in the late 18th century and fully developed in Germany in the first half of the 19th century. Unlike earlier forts, polygonal forts had no bastions, which had proven to be vulnerable. As part of ring fortresses, polygonal forts were generally arranged in a ring around the place they were intended to protect, so that each fort could support its neighbours. The concept of the polygonal fort proved to be adaptable to improvements in the artillery which might be used against them, and they continued to be built and rebuilt well into the 20th century.

== Bastion system deficiencies ==
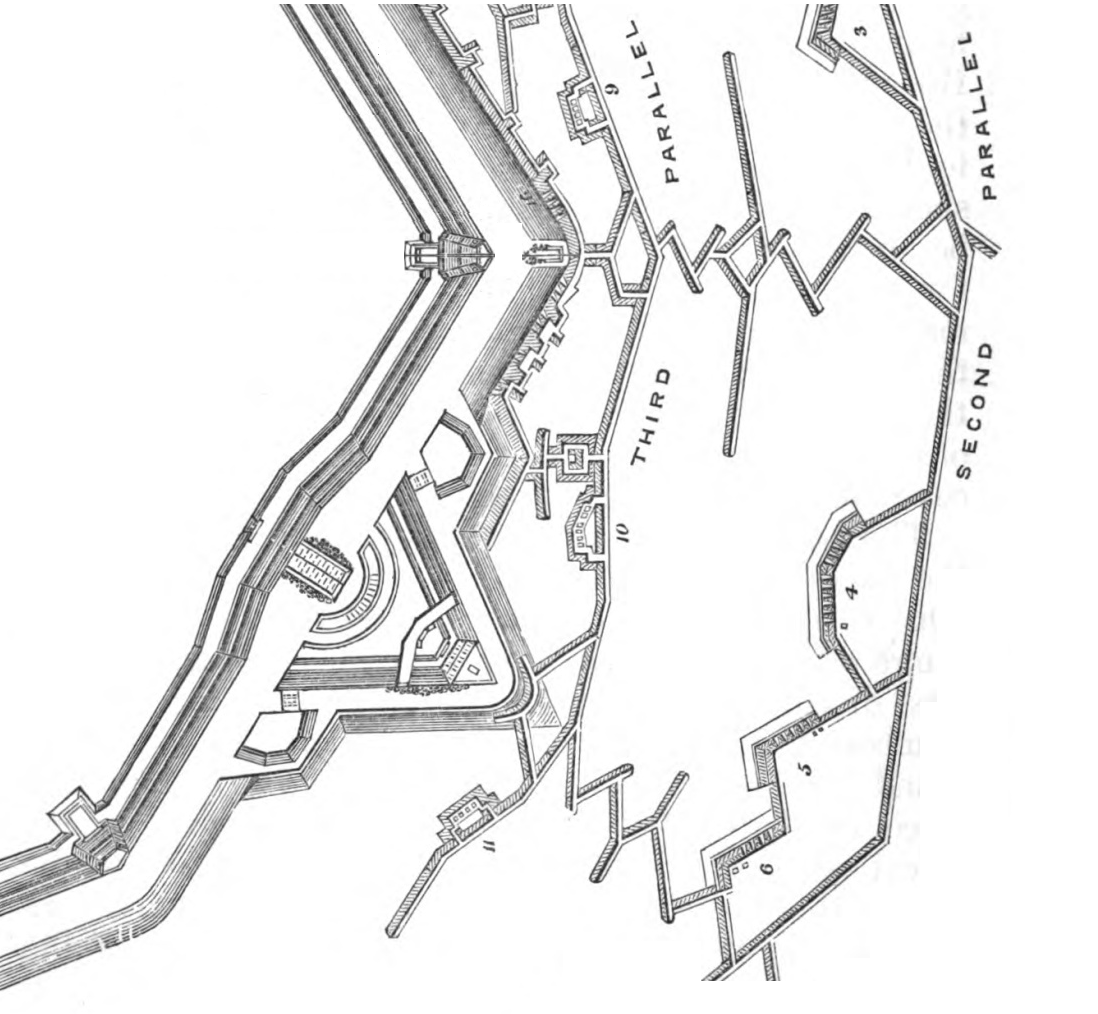
A diagram showing Vauban's method of approaching an enemy fortification using saps and parallels

The bastion system of fortification had dominated military thinking since its introduction in 16th century Italy, until the first decades of the 19th century. The French engineer Sébastien Le Prestre de Vauban also devised an effective method to defeat them. Before Vauban, besiegers had driven a sap towards the fort until they reached the glacis, where artillery could be positioned to fire directly on the scarp wall to make a breach. Vauban used saps to create three successive lines of entrenchments surrounding the fort, known as "parallels". The first two parallels reduced the vulnerability of the sapping work to a sally by the defenders, while the third parallel allowed the besiegers to launch their attack from any point along its circumference. The final refinement devised by Vauban was first used at the Siege of Ath in 1697, when he placed his artillery in the third (innermost) parallel at a point close to the bastions, from where they could ricochet their shot along the inside of the parapet, dismounting the enemy guns and killing the defenders.

Other European engineers quickly adopted the three-parallel Vauban system, which became the standard method and would prove to be almost infallible. Vauban designed three systems of fortification, each having a more elaborate system of outworks, which were intended to prevent the besiegers from enfilading the bastions. During the next century, other engineers tried and failed to perfect the bastion system to nullify the Vauban type of attack. During the 18th century, it was found that the continuous enceinte, or main defensive enclosure of a bastion fortress, could not be made large enough to accommodate the enormous field armies which were increasingly being employed in Europe; neither could the defences be constructed far enough away from the fortress town to protect the inhabitants from bombardment by the besiegers, the range of whose guns was steadily increasing as better manufactured weapons were introduced.

== Theories of Montalembert and Carnot ==
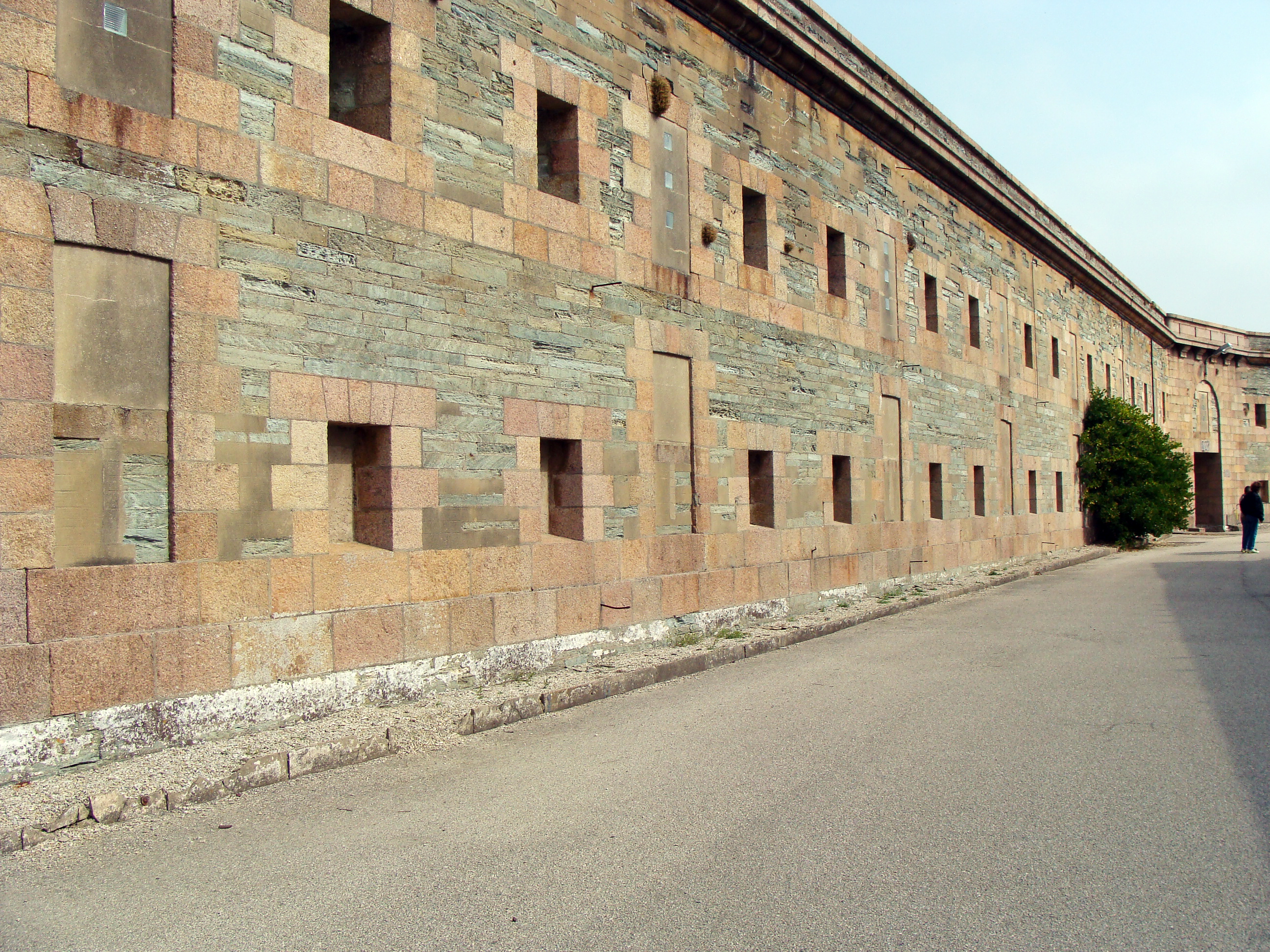
Fort de Querqueville, one of the casemated coastal forts at Cherbourg, which was based on Montalembert's system

Marc René, marquis de Montalembert (1714–1800) envisaged a system to prevent an opponent from establishing their parallel entrenchments by an overwhelming artillery barrage from a large number of guns, which were to be protected from return fire. The elements of his system were the replacement of bastions with tenailles, resulting in a defensive line with a zigzag plan, allowing for the maximum number of guns to be brought to bear and the provision of gun towers or redoubts (small forts), forward of the main line, each mounting a powerful artillery battery. All the guns were to be mounted in multi-storey masonry casemates, vaulted chambers built into the ramparts of the forts. Defence of the ditches was to be by caponiers, covered galleries projecting into the ditch with numerous loopholes for small arms, compensating for the loss of the bastions with their flanking fire. Montalembert argued that the three elements, would provide long-range offensive fire from the casemated main curtain, defence in depth from the detached forts or towers and close-in defence from the caponiers. Montalembert described his theories in an eleven-volume work called La Fortification Perpendiculaire, which was published in Paris between 1776 and 1778. He summarised the benefits of his system thus; "...all is exposed to the fire of the besieged, which is everywhere superior to that of the besieger, and the latter cannot advance a step without being hit from all sides".

A full realisation of Montalembert's ambitious plans for a great inland fortress was never attempted. Almost immediately after publication, unofficial translations into German were being made of Montalembert's work and were being circulated amongst the officers of the Prussian Army. In 1780, Gerhard von Scharnhorst, a Hanoverian officer who went on to reform the Prussian Army, wrote that "All foreign experts in military and engineering affairs hail Montalembert's work as the most intelligent and distinguished achievement in fortification over the last hundred years. Things are very different in France". The conservative French military establishment was wedded to the principles laid down by Vauban and improvements made by his later followers, Louis de Cormontaigne and Charles Louis de Fourcroy. What little political influence the aristocratic Montalembert had during the Ancien Régime was lost following the French Revolution in 1792.

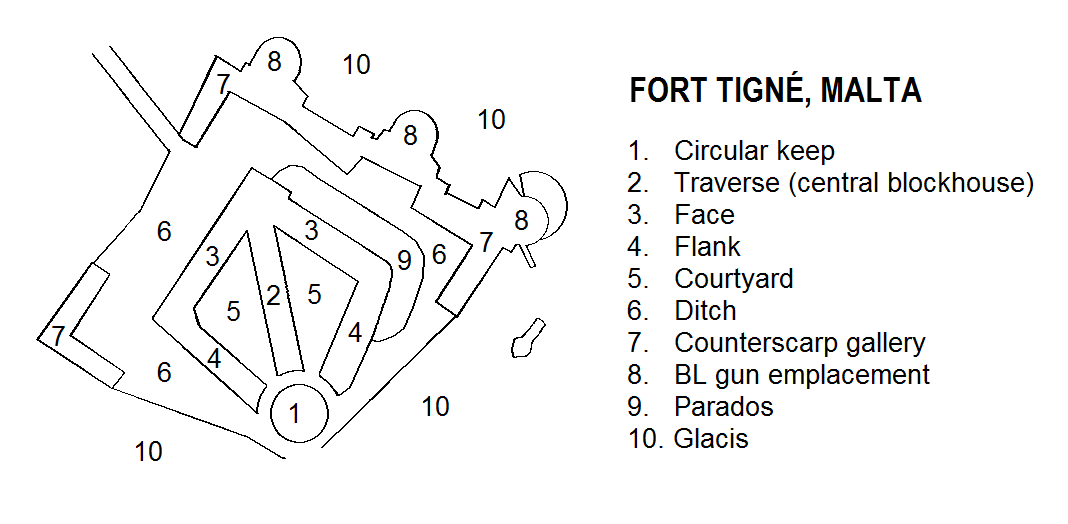
A simplified plan of Fort Tigné, Malta, regarded as being the first true polygonal fort. The gun emplacements marked "8" are later additions.

Despite the conservatism of the French engineer corps, two French engineers experimented on a modest scale with Montalembert's ideas for detached forts. Jean Le Michaud d'Arçon, ironically one of Montalembert's detractors, designed and built a number of lunettes (an outwork resembling a detached bastion) which were in accord with Montalembert's concepts. These lunettes were constructed at Mont-Dauphin, Besançon, Perpignan and other border fortresses, commencing in 1791 shortly before the Revolution. In the same year, Antoine Étienne de Tousard took up a position on Malta as an engineer to the Order of Saint John and was instructed to design a small fort to command the entrance to Marsamxett Harbour called Fort Tigné. Exactly how Tousard became acquainted with d'Arcon's lunette design is unknown, but the resemblance is too close to be coincidental. It was, like d'Arcon's works, quadrilateral in plan, divided by a traverse with a circular tower keep in the rear and the surrounding ditch was protected by counterscarp galleries. Fort Tigné, however, was a fully defensible and self-contained fort, larger and more sophisticated than d'Arcon's outworks, and is regarded as being the first true polygonal fort.

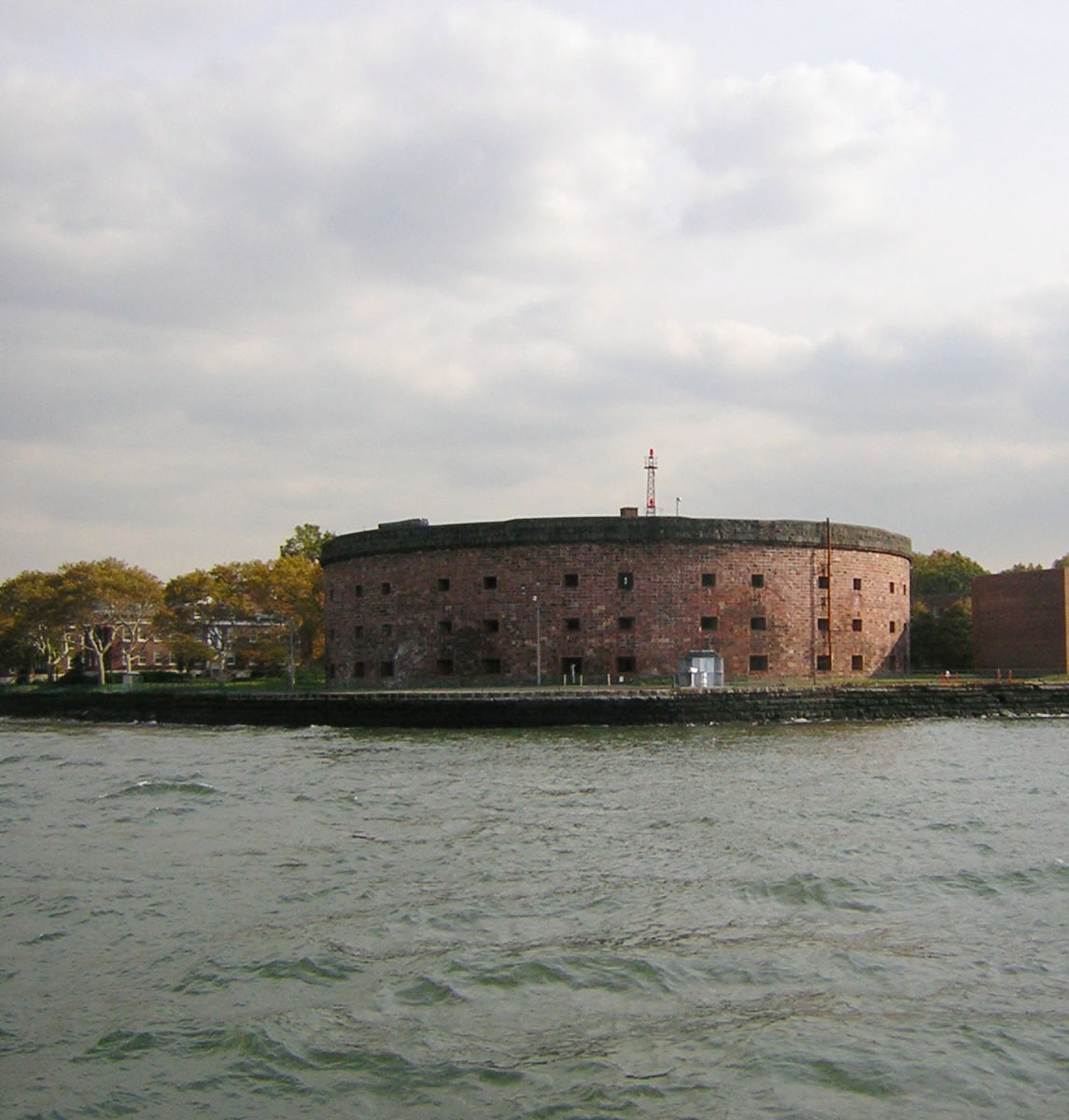
Castle Williams in New York Harbor, constructed from 1807 according to Montalembert's system

Montalembert's work was also allowed to take concrete form during his lifetime in the field of coastal fortification. In 1778, he was commissioned to build a fort on the Île-d'Aix, defending the port of Rochefort, Charente-Maritime. The outbreak of the Anglo-French War forced him hastily to build his casemated fort from wood but he was able to prove that his well-designed casemates were capable of operating without choking the gunners with smoke, one of the principal objections of his detractors. The defences of the new naval base at Cherbourg were later constructed according to his system. After seeing Montalembert's coastal forts, American engineer Jonathan Williams acquired a translation of his book and took it to the United States, where it inspired the Second and Third Systems of coastal fortification; the first fully developed example being Castle Williams in New York Harbor which was started in 1807.

Lazare Carnot was an able French engineer officer, whose support for Montalembert had impeded his military career immediately after the Revolution. Taking up politics, he was made Minister of War in 1800 and retired from public life two years later. In 1809, Napoleon I asked him to write a handbook for the commanders of fortresses, which was published in the following year under the title De la défense des places fortes. While broadly supporting Montalembert and rejecting the bastion system, Carnot proposed that an attacker's preparations should be disrupted by massed infantry sorties, supported by a hail of high-angle fire from mortars and howitzers. Some of Carnot's innovations, such as the Carnot wall, a loopholed wall at the foot of the scarp face of the rampart, to shelter defending infantry, were used in many later fortifications but remained controversial.

== Prussian System ==
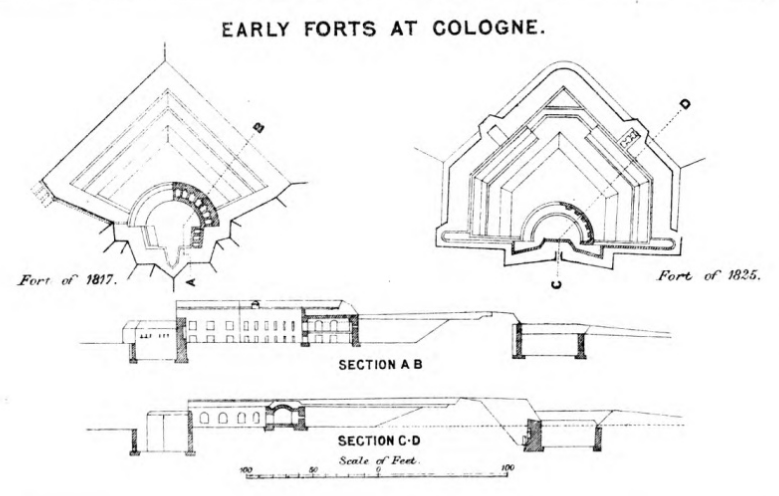
Early types of Prussian polygonal forts built at Cologne in 1817 and 1825

After the final fall of Napoleon I in 1815, the Congress of Vienna founded the German Confederation, an alliance of the numerous German states, dominated by the Kingdom of Prussia and the Austrian Empire. Their priority was to establish a defensive system with the Fortresses of the German Confederation against France in the west and Russia in the east. The Prussians started in the west by refortifying the fortress cities of Koblenz and Cologne (German: Köln), both important crossing points on the River Rhine, under the direction of Ernst Ludwig von Aster and assisted by Gustav von Rauch, both supporters of the Montalembert system. Clearly influenced by Montalembert and Carnot, the novel feature of these new works was that they were encircled by forts, each several hundred metres out from the original enceinte, carefully sited so as to make best use of the terrain and to be capable of mutual support with the neighbouring forts. The new fortifications established the principle of the ring fortress or girdle fortress.

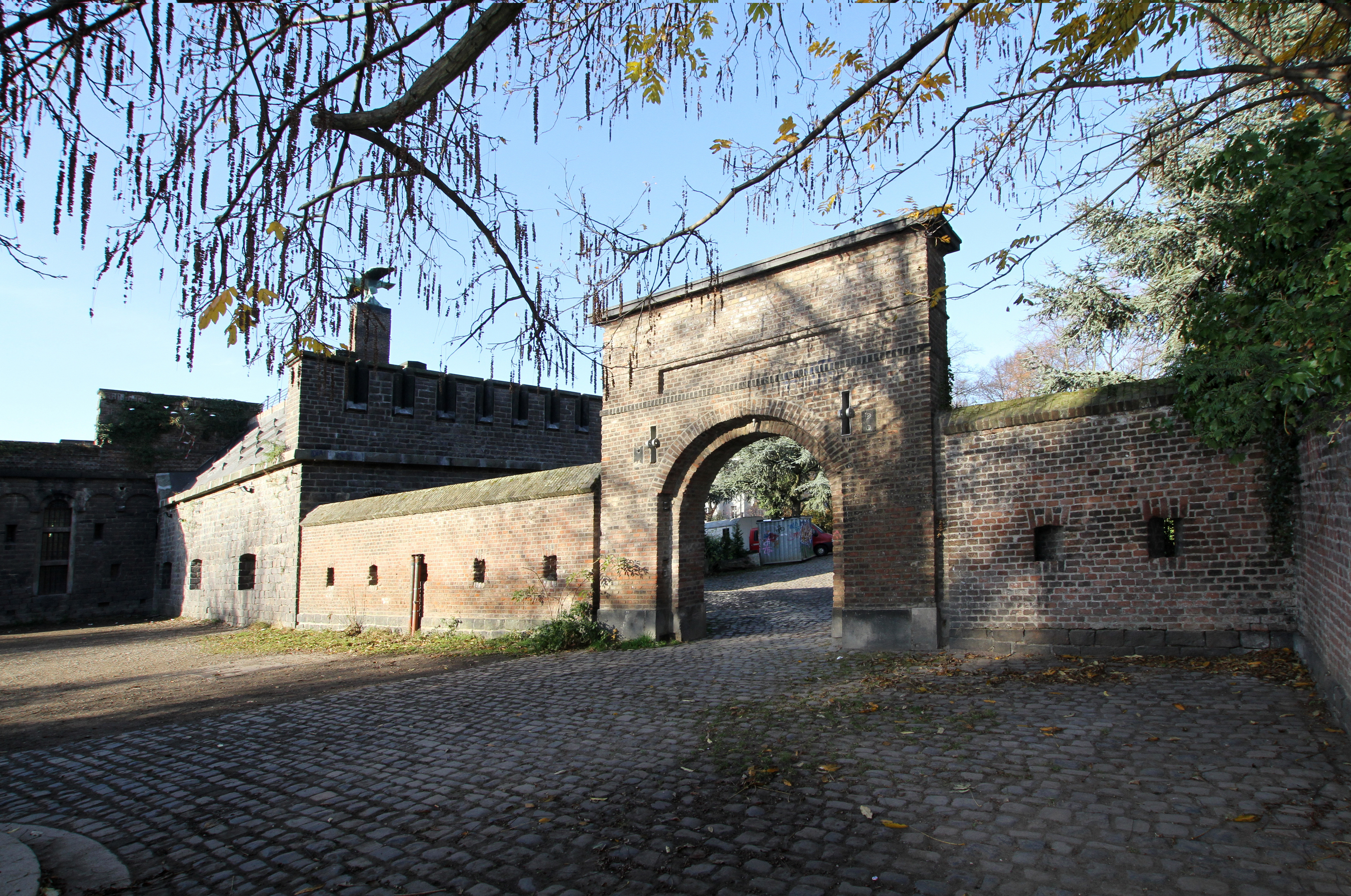
Fort I of the Cologne ring fortress at Neustadt-Süd, showing the gate in the gorge wall, protected by the reduit on the left

The detached forts were polygons of four or five sides in plan, with the front faces of the rampart angled at 95°. The rear or gorge of the fort was closed with a masonry wall, sufficient to repel a surprise infantry attack but easily demolished by the defenders' artillery should the fort be captured by the attackers. In the centre of the gorge wall was a reduit or keep, provided with casemates for guns which could fire over the rampart or along the flanks to support the next forts in the chain. The original bastioned enceintes of these fortresses were initially retained or even rebuilt so as to prevent an attacker from infiltrating between the outlying forts and taking the fortress by a coup de main. It was later thought by some engineers that a simple entrenchment would suffice or that no inner defence was necessary; the issue remained a debating point for some decades. In any case, few European cities undergoing the rapid expansion caused by the Industrial Revolution would willingly accept the restriction to their growth caused by a continuous line of ramparts. Aster insisted that his new technique was "not to be regarded... as a particular system" but this type of ring fortress became known as the Prussian System. Austrian engineers adopted a similar approach although differing in some details; the Prussian System and the Austrian System were together known as the German System.

== Lessons of the Crimean War ==
The Crimean War (October 1853 to February 1856) was fought by the Russian Empire and an alliance of the Ottoman Empire, France, Britain and Sardinia. Russian fortifications, which included some modern advances, were tested against the latest British and French artillery. At Sevastopol, the focus of the allied effort, the Russians had planned a modern fortress but little work had been done and earthworks were rapidly constructed instead. The largest and most complex earthwork, the Great Redan, was found to be largely resistant to British bombardments and difficult to carry by assault. Only one stone casemated work, the Malakoff Tower, had been completed at the time of the allied landing and proved impervious to bombardment but was finally carried by French infantry in a coup de main. In the Battle of Kinburn (1855), an Anglo-French fleet undertook a bombardment of the Russian fortress which guarded the mouth of the Dnieper River. The most successful weapon there was the Paixhans gun which was mounted on ironclad floating batteries. These guns were the first to be able to fire explosive shells on a low trajectory and were able to devastate the open ramparts of the forts, causing their surrender within four hours. British attempts to subdue the casemated Russian forts at Kronstadt and other fortifications in the Baltic Sea using conventional naval guns were far less successful.

== Impact of rifled artillery ==
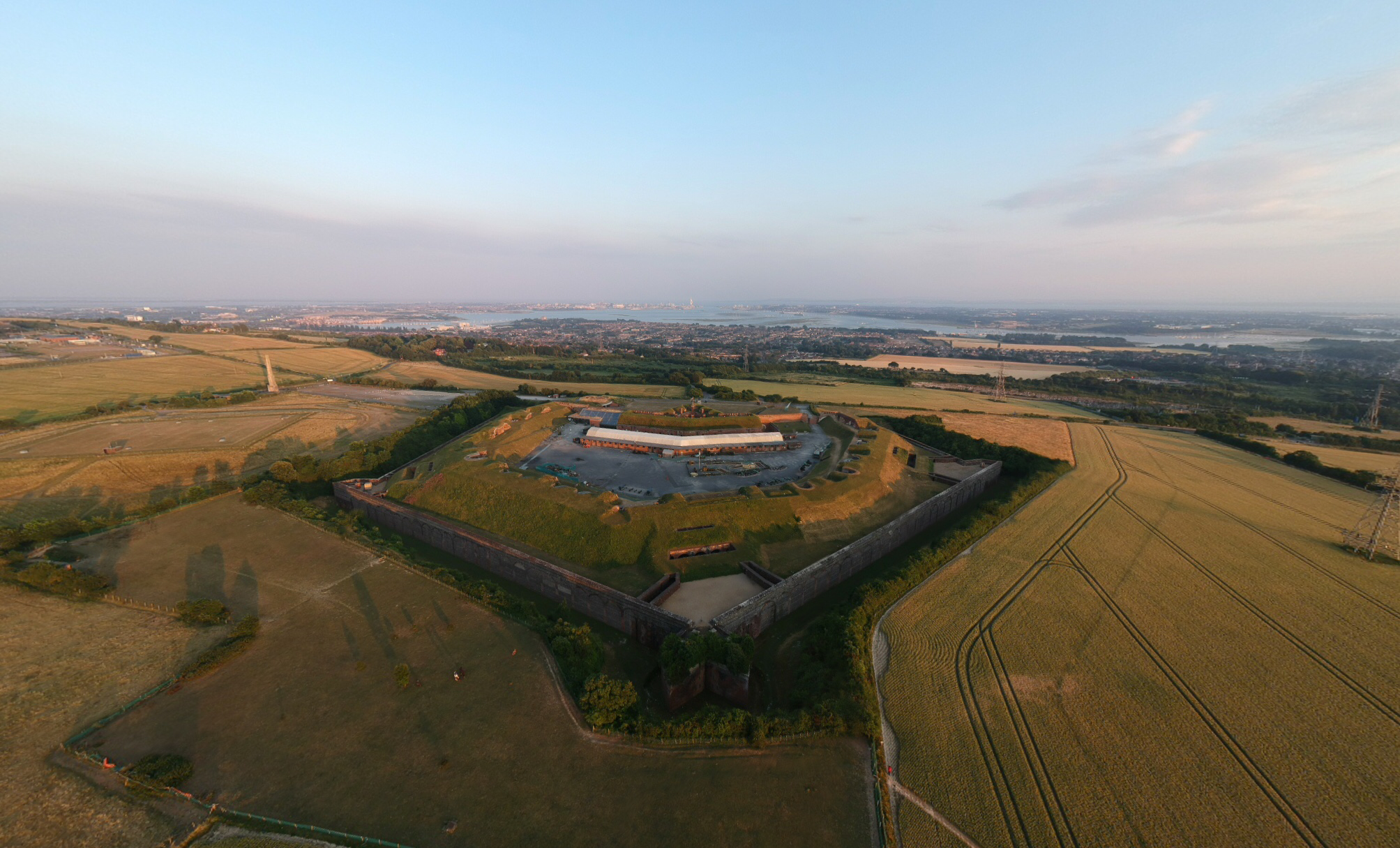
Fort Nelson at Portsmouth, one of the Palmerston Forts built in the United Kingdom in the 1860s

The first rifled artillery designs were developed independently during the 1840s and 1850s by several engineers in Europe. These weapons offered greatly increased range, accuracy and penetrating power over smooth-bore guns then in use. The first effective use of rifled guns was during the Second Italian War of Independence in 1859, when the French used them against the Austrians. The Austrians quickly realised that the outlying forts of their ring fortresses were now too close to prevent an enemy from bombarding a besieged town and at Verona, they added a second circle of forts, about 1 mi (1.6 km) forward of the existing ring.

The British were apprehensive about a French invasion and in 1859 appointed the Royal Commission on the Defence of the United Kingdom to fortify the naval dockyards of southern England. The experts on the commission, led by Sir William Jervois, interviewed Sir William Armstrong, a major developer and manufacturer of rifled artillery and were able to incorporate his advice into their designs. The ring forts at Plymouth and Portsmouth were set further out than the Prussian designs they were based on and the casemates of coastal batteries were protected by composite armoured shields, tested to be resistant to the latest heavy projectiles.

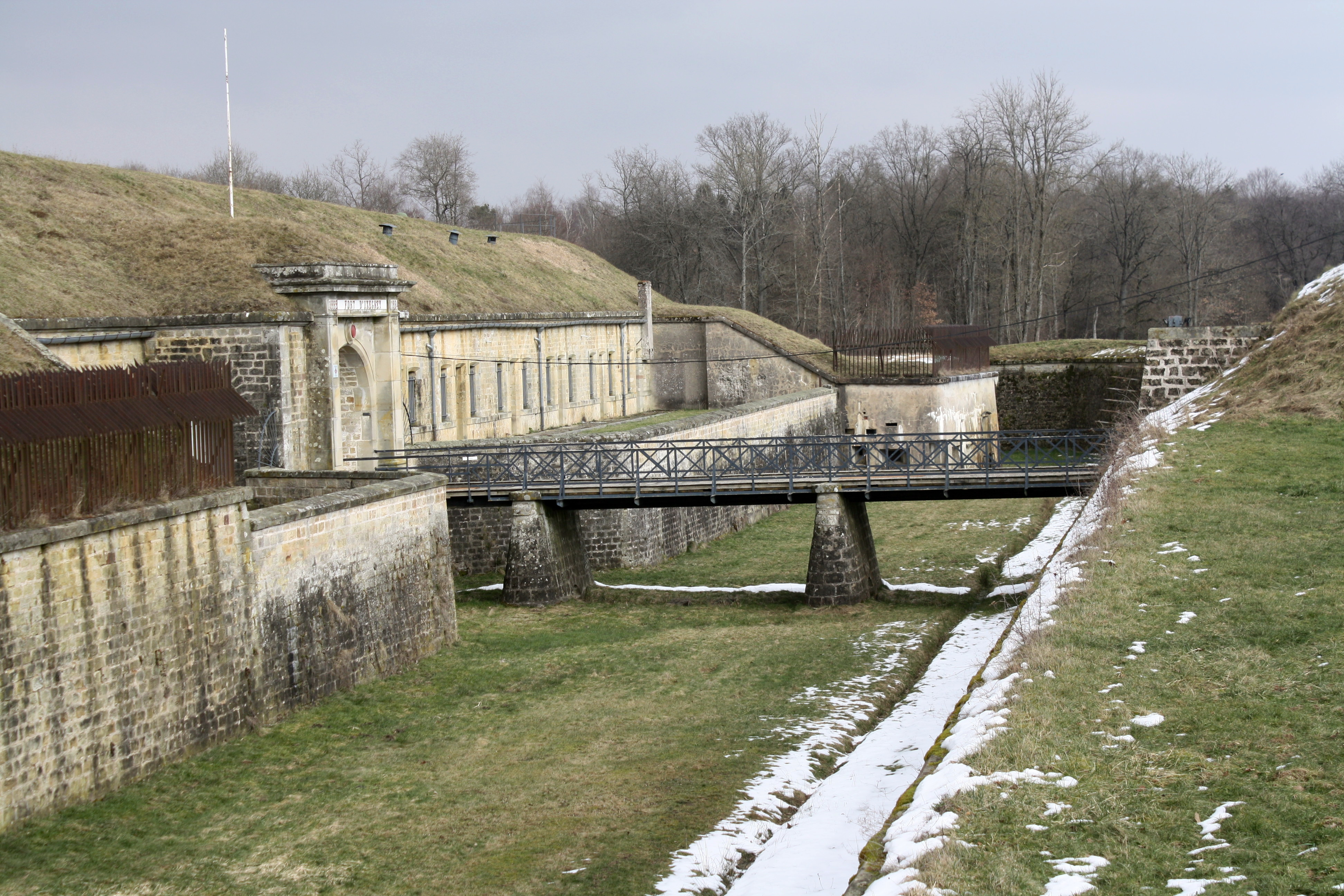
The gorge or interior of Fort d'Uxegney, showing the heavily protected accommodation casemates typical of the Séré de Rivières system

In the United States, it had been decided at an early stage that it would be impractical to provide landward fortifications for rapidly expanding cities but a considerable investment had been made in seaward defences in the form of multi-tiered casemated batteries, originally based on Montalembert's designs. During the American Civil War of 1861 to 1865, the exposed masonry of these coastal batteries was found to be vulnerable to modern rifled artillery; Fort Pulaski was quickly breached by only ten of these guns. On the other hand, the hastily constructed earthworks of landward fortifications proved much more resilient; the garrison of Fort Wagner were able to hold out for 58 days behind ramparts built of sand.

In France the military establishment clung to the concept of the bastion system. Between 1841 and 1844, an immense bastioned trace, the Thiers Wall, was built around Paris. It was a single rampart 21 mi (33 km) long reinforced by 94 bastions. The main approaches to the city were further defended by several outlying bastioned forts, designed for all-round defence but not sited to be mutually supporting. In the Franco-Prussian War of 1870, the invading Prussians were able to surround Paris after taking some of the outer forts and then bombard the city and its population with their rifled siege guns, without the need for a costly assault.

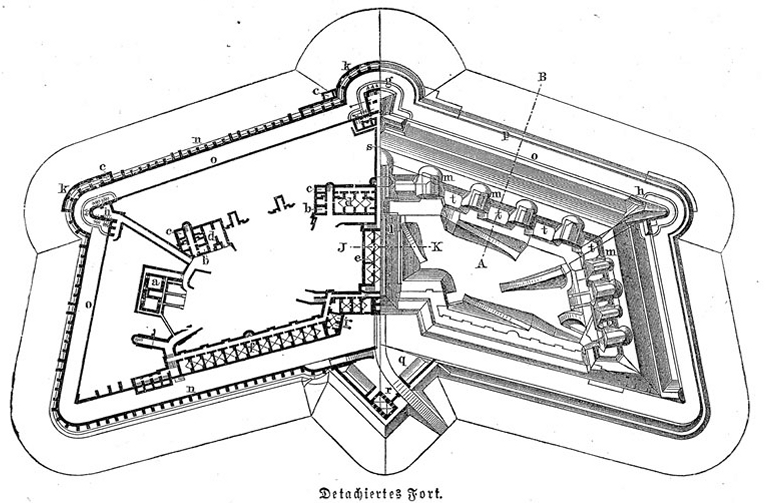
A typical German "Biehler fort" of the 1870s.

In the aftermath of defeat, the French belatedly adopted a version of the polygonal system in a huge programme of fortification which commenced in 1874, under the direction of General Raymond Adolphe Séré de Rivières. Polygonal forts typical of the Séré de Rivières system had guns protected by iron armour or revolving Mougin turrets. The vulnerable masonry of the accommodation casemates were built facing away from an opponent, protected overhead by large mounds of earth, 18 ft (5.5 m) deep. The programme involved the building of ring fortresses around Paris and to guard border crossings, often surrounding Vauban-era fortifications; the loss of Alsace-Lorraine to the Prussians created the need for a new defensive zone, described as a "barrier of iron". Similar forts were also being built in Germany designed by Hans Alexis von Biehler.

== The "torpedo-shell crisis" ==
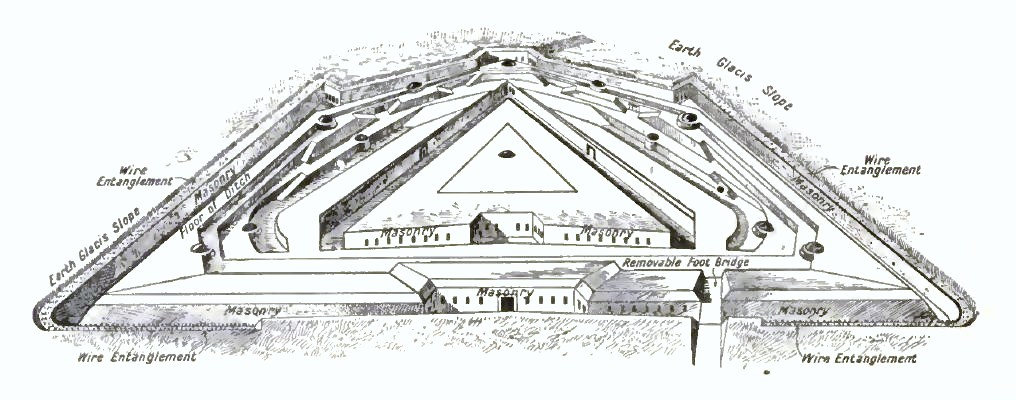
A typical Belgian fort designed by Henri Alexis Brialmont in the 1880s, showing the broadly triangular plan which he favoured

From the mid-19th century, chemists produced the first high explosive compounds, as opposed to low explosives such as gunpowder. The first of these, nitroglycerine and from 1867, dynamite, proved to be too unstable to be fired from a gun without exploding in the barrel. In 1885, the French chemist Eugène Turpin, patented a form of picric acid, which proved stable enough to be used as a blasting charge in artillery shells. These shells had recently evolved from the traditional sphere of iron into a pointed cylinder, at that time known as a "torpedo-shell". The combination of these, combined with new delayed-action fuzes, meant that shells could bury themselves deep under the surface of a fort and then explode with unprecedented force. The realisation that this new technology made even the most modern forts vulnerable was known as the "torpedo-shell crisis". The great powers of continental Europe were forced into vastly expensive programmes of fortification building and rebuilding to designs that were calculated to counter this latest threat.

In France, the recently completed forts began to be refurbished, with thick layers of concrete reinforcing the ramparts and the roofs of magazines and accommodation spaces. The Belgians had not started their new fortifications when the effectiveness of the new munitions became known and their chief engineer, Henri Alexis Brialmont, was able to incorporate countermeasures in his design. Brialmont forts were triangular in plan and made extensive use of concrete with the main armament mounted in rotating turrets connected by tunnels. The French and Belgians assumed that the new forts must be able to withstand siege guns up to a calibre of 8 in (21 cm) as this was the largest mobile weapon in use. In Germany, after updating their Biehler forts with layers of sand and concrete and building others in the style of Brialmont, a new design emerged, in which fort artillery and infantry positions would be dispersed in the landscape, connected only by trenches or tunnels and without a continuous enceinte. This type of fortified position was called a Feste and was the result of the work of several German theorists but came to fruition under Colmar Freiherr von der Goltz who was appointed Inspector-General of Fortifications in 1898.

== World Wars ==
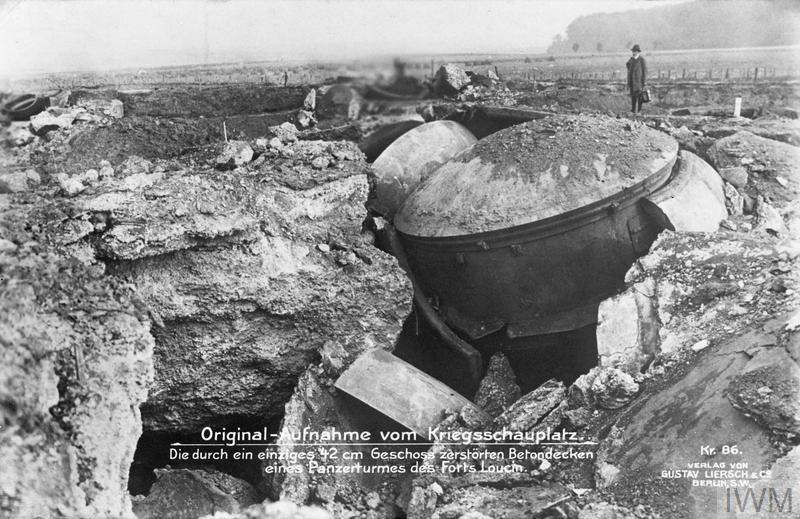
Damage from a 42 cm howitzer to a Mougin turret at Fort de Loncin during the Battle of Liège in August 1914

=== First World War ===
At the start of the First World War in August 1914, the German Army crossed into neutral Belgium with the object of outflanking the French border fortifications. In their path was the fortified position of Liège, a ring fortress built by Brialmont with a circumference of 29 mi (46 km) which the Germans reached on 4 August. Repeated attempts to pass massed infantry through the intervals between the forts resulted in the capture of the city of Liège on 7 August, at the cost of 47,500 German casualties and without any of the forts being taken. The forts were only subdued by the arrival of super-heavy 42 cm Gamma Mörser siege howitzers and other large weapons, which were capable of smashing the armoured turrets and penetrating the concrete living spaces; the last fort surrendering on 16 August. The fortified position of Namur was demolished in the same fashion a few days later and that at Antwerp only survived for longer because fewer resources were directed against it.

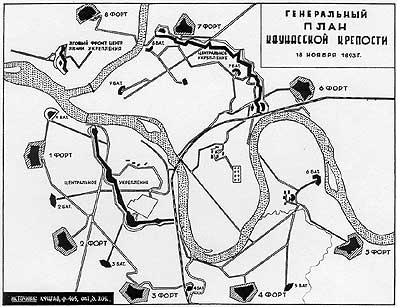
The Russian ring fortress at Kaunas, which was abandoned by the garrison after Forts 1, 2 and 3 were lost to German assaults in July and August 1915

On the Eastern Front, most polygonal fortifications were also quickly overcome by heavy artillery. The Kaunas Fortress (now in Lithuania) was the most expensive fortification in the Russian Empire, but a modernisation programme was incomplete. In July 1915, German assaults concentrated on three un-modernised forts in the southwest sector. Following the loss of these forts the garrison abandoned the entire fortress, prompted by the desertion of their commanding officer on the previous day, the assault having lasted only eleven days. Another Russian ring fortress at Novogeorgievsk, later renamed Modlin, which guarded the northern approach to Warsaw, fell after a siege of 10 days in August 1915, with the loss of 90,000 men taken prisoner and 1,600 guns. The largest Austro-Hungarian fortification was Przemyśl Fortress which protected the province of Eastern Galicia and had a ring of twenty five modern polygonal forts. An invading Russian army besieged the fortress, but initially lacked heavy artillery and were short of ammunition for their field guns. An initial infantry assault in September 1914 was repulsed with heavy Russian losses, but the fortress was finally surrendered in the following March, after both a relief attempt and a breakout had failed.

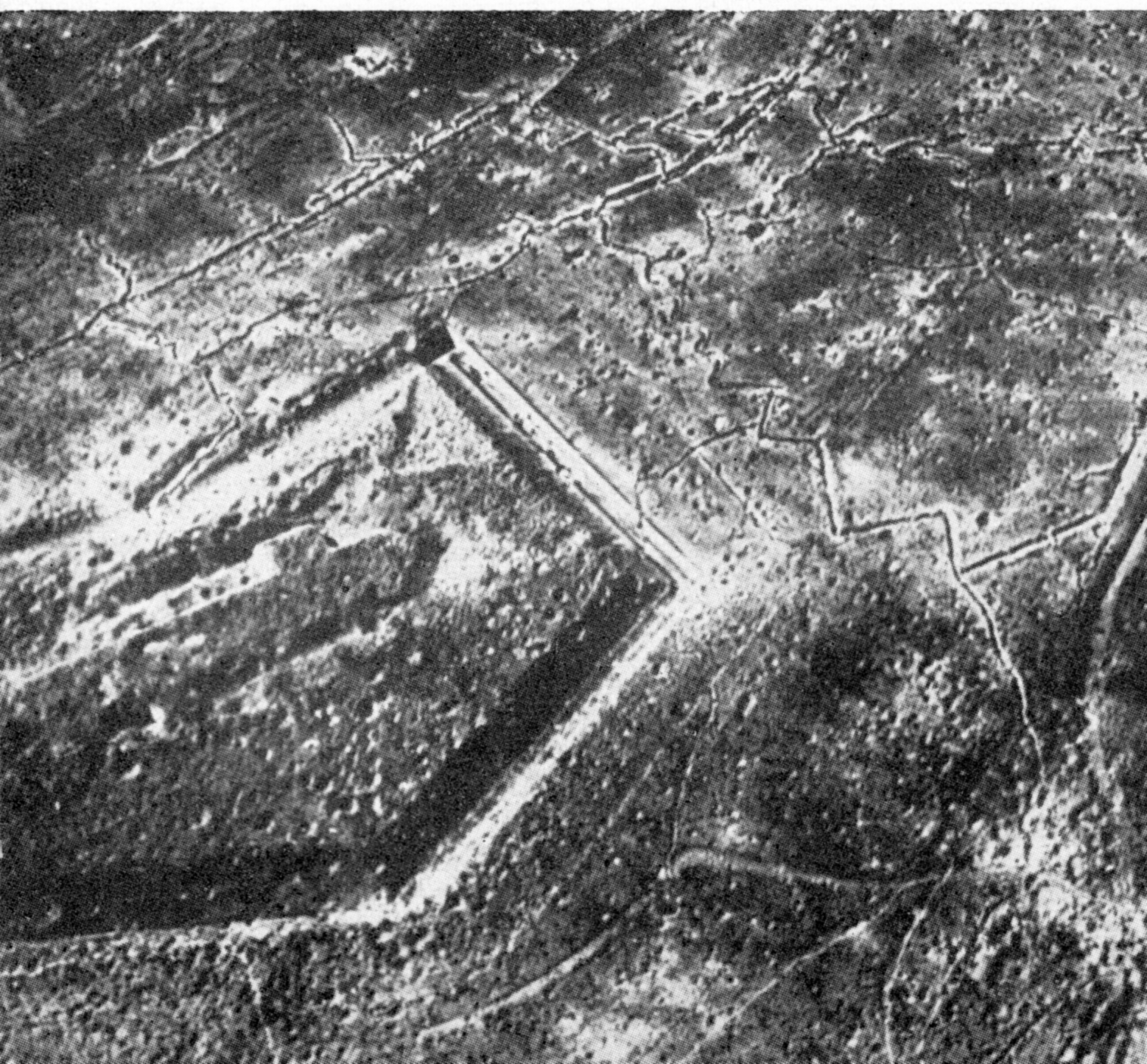
An aerial photograph of Fort Douaumont at the close of the Battle of Verdun in December 1916, following months of bombardment from both sides

Following these failures, the French high command concluded that fixed fortifications were obsolete and they began the process of disarming their forts, since there was a grave shortage of medium artillery pieces in their field armies. In February 1916, the Germans began the Battle of Verdun, hoping to force the French to squander their forces in costly counter-attacks in an effort to regain it. They found that the Verdun forts, which had been recently upgraded with extra layers of concrete and sand, were resistant to their heaviest shells. Fort Douaumont was captured, almost by accident, by a small party of Germans who climbed through an unattended embrasure, the rest of the forts could not permanently be subdued and the offensive was eventually called off in July after huge casualties on both sides.

=== Inter-war developments ===
After the war, the apparent success of the Verdun forts led the French government to re-fortify the eastern border. Rather than build new polygonal forts, the method chosen was a developed version of the German Feste system of dispersed strongpoints connected by tunnels to a central underground barracks, all concealed in the landscape. This concept known to the French as fort palmé because the elements of the fort were analogous to the fingers of a hand. The system became known as the Maginot Line, after the French Minister of War, who had initiated the project in 1930. Where the Maginot Line coincided with Séré de Rivières forts, new concrete casemates were constructed inside the old works. In Belgium, a series of commissions decided that a new line of fortifications should be constructed at Liège, while some of the old forts there should be modernised. Three new forts were constructed which were developed forms of the old Brialmont polygonal forts. The fourth and largest, Fort Eben-Emael, had its enceinte defined by the great cutting of the Albert Canal.

=== Second World War ===
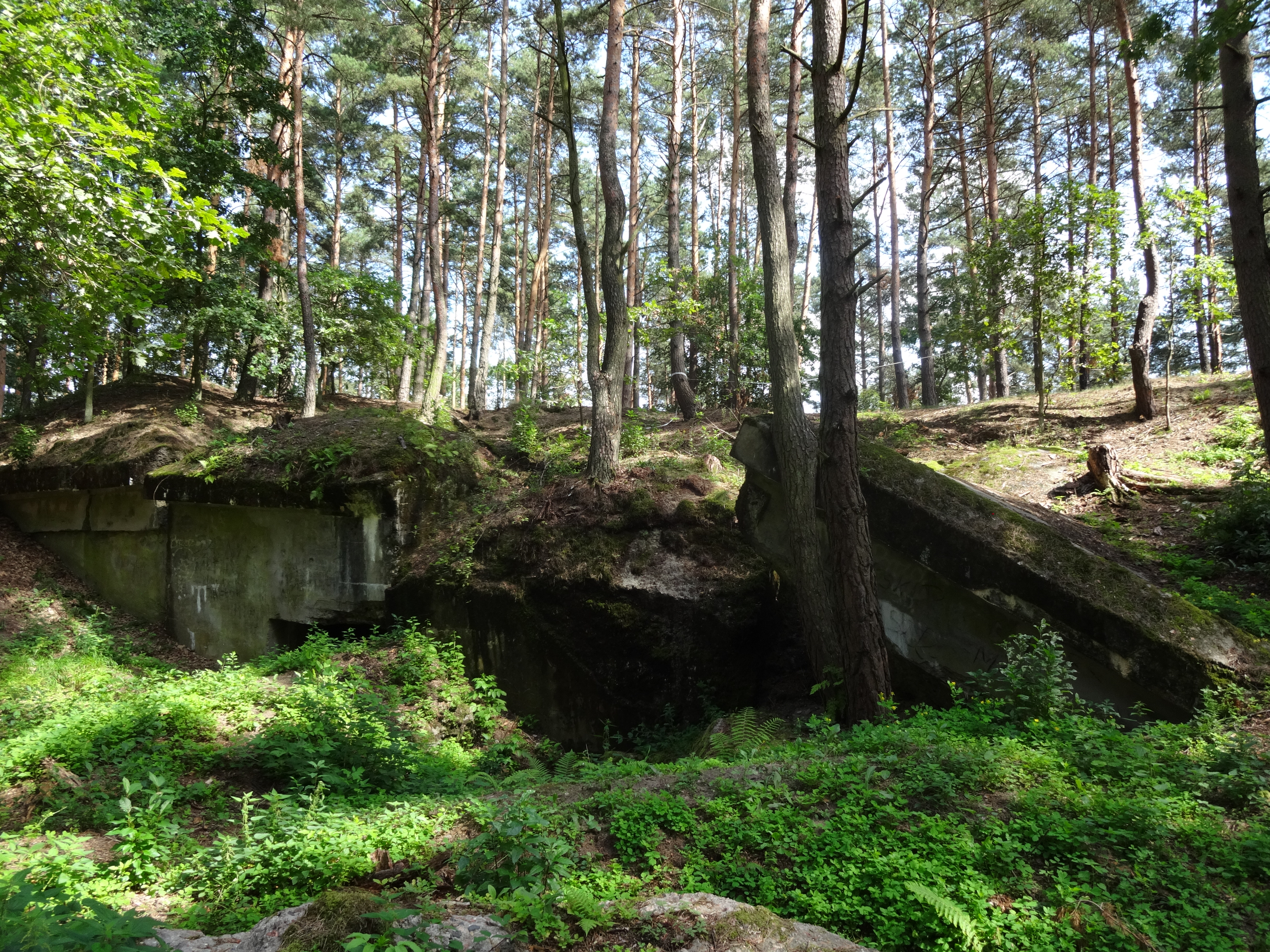
A concrete casemate at Fort XVIII of the Modlin Fortress, destroyed during the Battle of Modlin in 1939

The war opened with the German invasion of Poland on 1 September 1939; by 13 September, Warsaw and the partly-modernised fortress of Modlin had been surrounded. The fortress was separated from Warsaw on 22 September and despite numerous German infantry assaults supported by heavy artillery and dive bombing, Modlin was not surrendered until 29 September after receiving the news that Warsaw had fallen.

On 10 May 1940, German forces attacked the new Belgian forts, quickly neutralising Eben-Emael by airborne assault. The three other forts were bombarded by 305 mm howitzers and dive-bombers and each repulsed several infantry assaults. Two of the forts surrendered on 21 May and the last, Fort de Battice, on the following day, having been by-passed by the main German thrust. Modernised French polygonal forts at Maubeuge were attacked on 19 May and were surrendered after their gun turrets and observation domes had been knocked out with anti-tank guns and demolition charges. Late in the war, the ring fortifications of Metz were hastily prepared for defence by German forces and were attacked by the Third Army in mid-September 1944 in the Battle of Metz; the last fort surrendered nearly three months later.
