= List of monuments in Naxxar =

This is a list of monuments in Naxxar, Malta, which are listed on the National Inventory of the Cultural Property of the Maltese Islands.

== List ==
Name of object	Location	Coordinates	ID	Photo	Upload
Qalet Marku Tower	Qalet Marku, Baħar iċ-Ċagħaq	35°56′47″N 14°27′12″E	00034	Qalet Marku Tower	Upload Photo
Għallis Tower	Tul il-Kosta, il-Magħtab	35°57′12″N 14°26′04″E	00051	Għallis Tower	Upload Photo
Tal-Qadi Temple	Triq L-Imdawra	35°56′12″N 14°25′14″E	00059	Tal-Qadi Temple	Upload Photo
Palazzo Parisio	Pjazza Vitorja	35°54′54″N 14°26′39″E	01205	Palazzo Parisio	Upload Photo
Church of the Assumption	Triq il-Kappella ta' Santa Marija, il-Magħtab	35°56′07″N 14°26′45″E	01250	Church of the Assumption	Upload Photo
Għallis Battery	Tul il-Kosta, il-Magħtab	35°56′58″N 14°26′46″E	01380		Upload Photo
Qalet Marku Battery	Qalet Marku, Baħar iċ-Ċagħaq	35°56′42″N 14°27′14″E	01381	Qalet Marku Battery	Upload Photo
Ximenes Redoubt	Tul il-Kosta, Baħar iċ-Ċagħaq	35°56′52″N 14°25′32″E	01401	Ximenes Redoubt	Upload Photo
Qalet Marku Redoubt (Remains)	Tul il-Kosta, Baħar iċ-Ċagħaq	35°56′35″N 14°27′04″E	01402		Upload Photo
Baħar iċ-Ċagħaq Redoubt	Tul il-Kosta c/w Triq Baħar iċ-Ċagħaq, Baħar iċ-Ċagħaq	35°56′24″N 14°27′21″E	01403	Baħar iċ-Ċagħaq Redoubt	Upload Photo
Madliena Entrenchment	Triq Baħar iċ-Ċagħaq, Baħar iċ-Ċagħaq	35°56′13″N 14°27′44″E	01423		Upload Photo
Naxxar Entrenchment	Triq il-Fortiżża tal-Mosta	35°55′24″N 14°26′14″E	01427	Naxxar Entrenchment	Upload Photo
Gauci Tower	"Torri Gauci", Triq San Pawl	35°55′12″N 14°26′33″E	01430	Gauci Tower	Upload Photo
Captain's Tower	Triq San Pawl c/w Triq Birguma	35°55′15″N 14°26′33″E	01431	Captain's Tower	Upload Photo
Salina Fougasse	Tul il-Kosta, is-Salina	35°56′53″N 14°25′34″E	01438	Salina Fougasse	Upload Photo
