= Ta' Cisju Farmhouse =

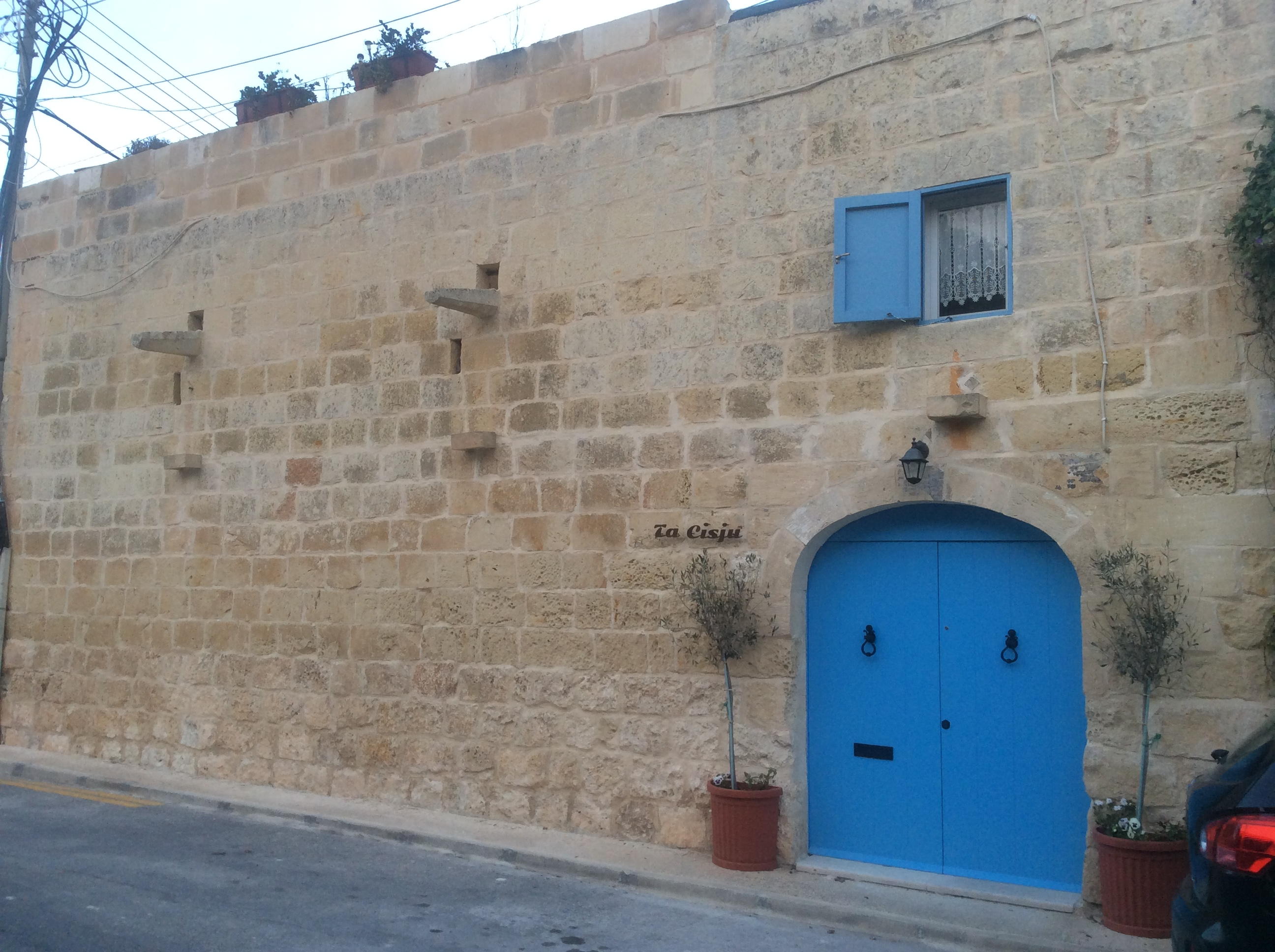
- View of the Ta' Cisju Farmhouse
- Interactive map of the Ta' Cisju Farmhouse area

General information
- Status: Intact
- Type: Farmhouse; Residential property
- Architectural style: Vernacular
- Location: Naxxar, Malta
- Coordinates: 35°55′10.25″N 14°26′35.87″E
- Completed: 1730

Technical details
- Material: Limestone
- Floor count: 2

Ta' Cisju Farmhouse is an 18th-century farmhouse in Naxxar, Malta. The farmhouse was built in 1730 in an area known as Ħal Muselmiet, during the rule of the Order of St. John. According to the Naxxar Local Council, the building is the oldest farmhouse in the area of its type. The farmhouse has a vernacular structure with traditional Maltese architecture. The farmhouse was used for agricultural purposes but it is now a residential building.

== Location ==
Ta' Cisju Farmhouse is found in an area known as Ħal Muselmiet. The area was named during the Arab period in Malta, which literally means 'Village of the Muslims'. The farmhouse has no direct connection with the Arab period but the farmlands of the area, which were developed during the Arabs, have a direct connection as the farmhouse is an agricultural building. It is located right on the side of a main road in Naxxar that lead to San Pawl tat-Targa. The farmhouse is found in the same area as the Hompesch Hunting Lodge of which both have the same public garden in front of them. Not far from the farmhouse are found the Gauci Tower and the Captain's Tower which were built before the farmhouse. When the farmhouse was built it was surrounded by farmlands but most of the area is urban today. Some fields still exist close to the building. The farmhouse has become a corner building as roads were constructed next to it.

== History ==
Since the Arab period, the area was a fertile ground, and many fields are found until this day. The area became a village during the Arab rule of which only the rural characteristics remain to be most evident of this. The area use to receiv surprise attacks from sea corsairs, and for this reason it was unpopular among locals to settle in the area. Even though in the area there is the Gauci Tower (built by Francesco Gauci in 1548) and the Knights built the Captain's Tower to further enhance the protection of the farming community, both of them served of a lesser service to the farmhouse when it was built. This is because in the late 17th century the Order of St. John built the Wignacourt towers, the Lascaris towers and the De Redin towers. The towers served the community, including the Ta' Cisju Farmhouse, as a better defense and thus allowing the prosperity of the village.

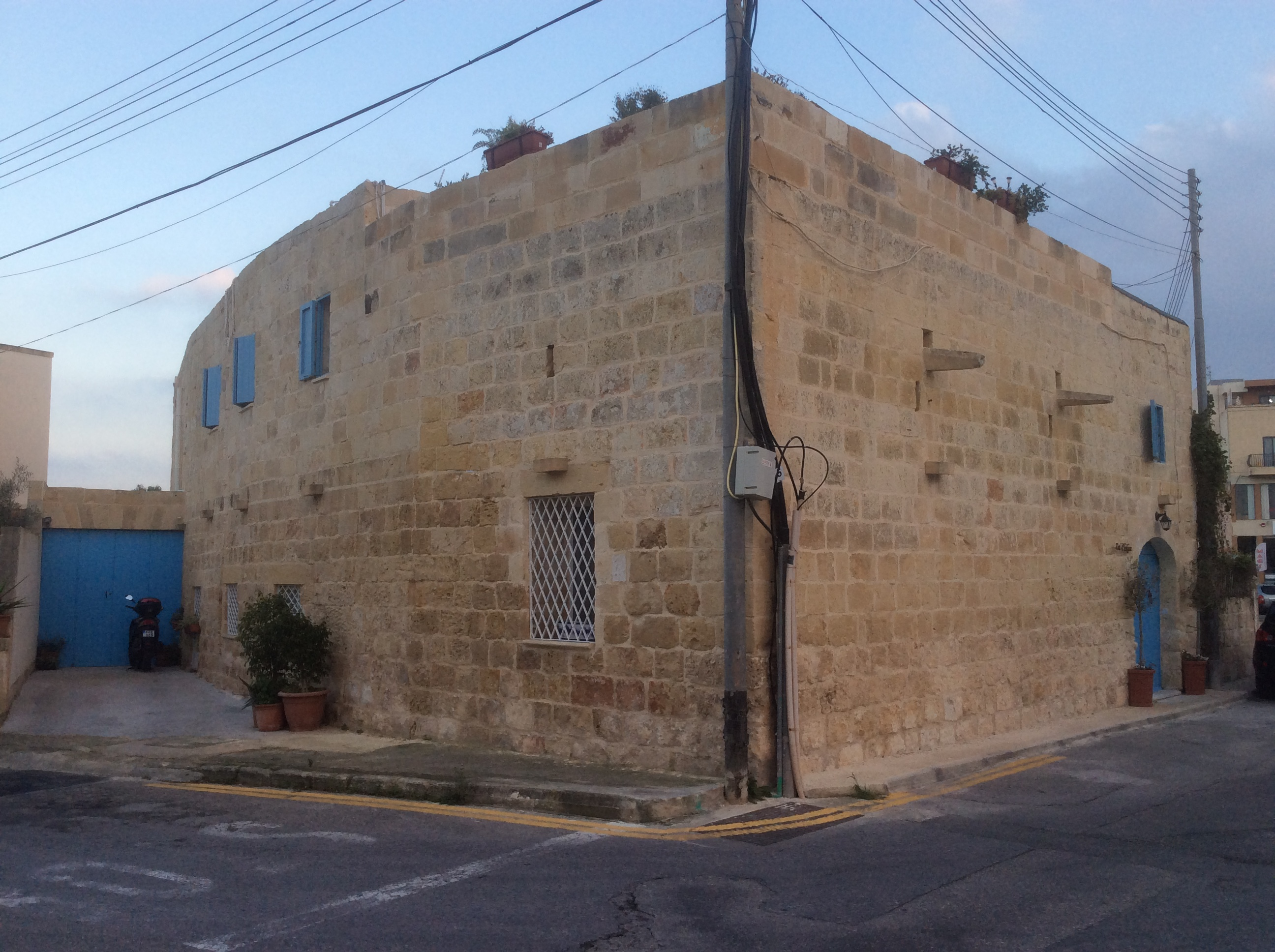
The Ta' Cisju Farmhouse is now set in a corner

The farmlands have a direct association with the building of the farmhouse as it served as a rural building for the farmer, or farmers, who cultivated the lands in the area. The lands offered fertile grounds for the few families who lived there in the 18th-century. It is possibly one of the first structures of its type to be built in the said area, and remains to be known as the 'oldest farmhouse' in Naxxar. It is believed that the farmhouse was built in 1730. This date is indicated with it being written on the facade close to a window on the first floor.

Naxxar started to develop into a village as it is known today during the British period as during the knights it was mostly an agricultural area and a hunting zone. During the British the farmhouse became a residential house and complete with electricity. Some rooms were evidently added to the back of the farmhouse. probably to make it a comfortable residence, but significantly the original building was maintained and restored sometimes in the early 21st-century. The farmhouse is now named as Ta' Cisju; this name has no historical connection and consequently it is not found in any literature until the start of the 21st-century.

== Architecture ==
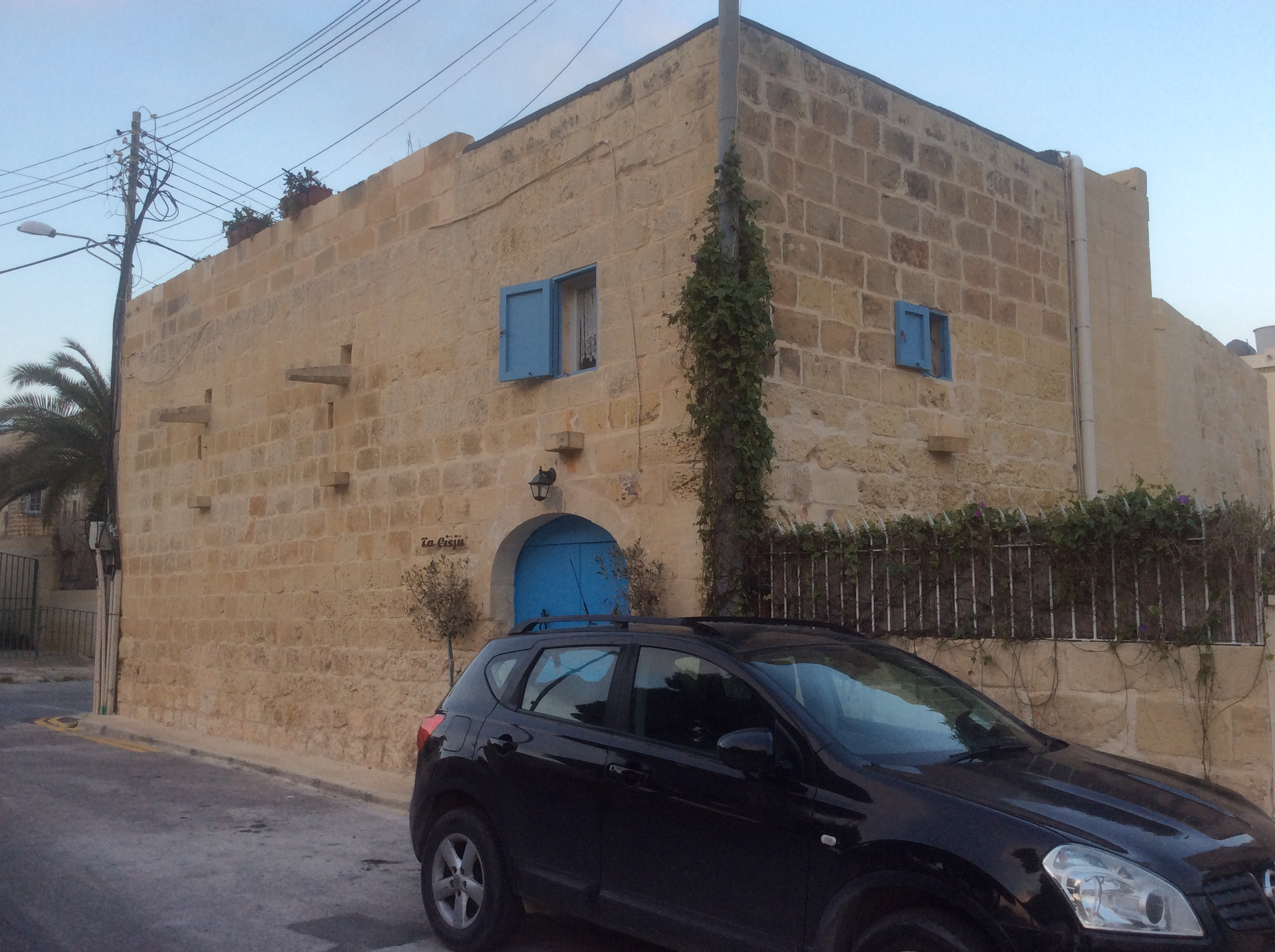
Ta' Cisju Farmhouse is in a good state of preservation

Ta' Cisju Farmhouse is a good example of Maltese traditional agricultural building. It takes in the form of modest vernacular architecture. It was built to serve for agricultural needs in 1730, with some possible influence of building of the order of St. John, but its description shows it is largely traditional. Some rooms were added in recent years (post-2000) at the back of the building with similar characteristics. A large window was opened at the lower floor, which consequentially removed some 18th-century stonework. This can be noticed from the photos taken before and after the rehabilitation and conversion of the property. Today the farmhouse is a residential home and has modern facilities. The farmhouse was restored sometimes in the early 21st-century and is in a good state of preservation. The farmhouse has typical traditional characteristic similar to other farmhouses in Naxxar, such as; a wide arched doorway (remissa), small window at the first floor (the first floor is traditionally known as Għorfa), waterspouts on the exterior, limestone slabs and other.

== See also ==
- Hompesch Hunting Lodge
- Gauci Tower
- Captain's Tower
