= Hompesch Hunting Lodge =

18th-century hunting lodge in Malta

- Id-Dar tal-Kacca
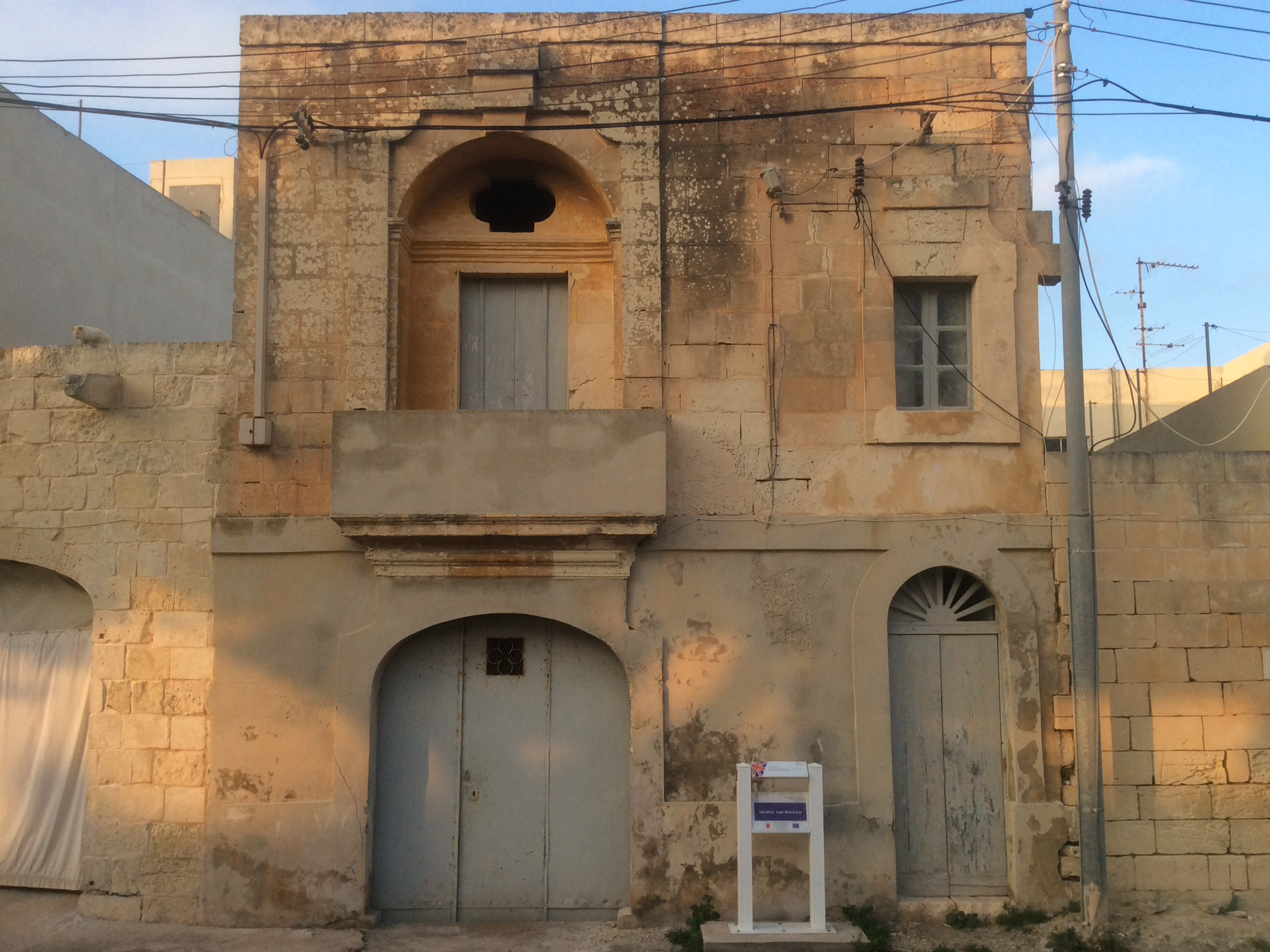
- Front façade of Hompesch Hunting Lodge

- Location within Malta

General information
- Status: Intact
- Type: Hunting lodge
- Architectural style: Vernacular
- Location: Naxxar, Malta
- Coordinates: 35°55′9.59″N 14°26′36.56″E
- Named for: Ferdinand von Hompesch zu Bolheim
- Completed: 18th century
- Owner: Private property

Technical details
- Material: Limestone
- Floor count: 2

Hompesch Hunting Lodge, also known as Id-Dar tal-Kaċċa (English: The Hunting Lodge), is an 18th-century hunting lodge in Naxxar, Malta. It is a traditional Maltese historic building with a vernacular architecture. The hunting lodge was built intentionally to be used as a hunting lodge for the Grand Master of the Order of St. John, namely Grand Master Ferdinand von Hompesch zu Bolheim. Today the building is in a dilapidated state.

== Location ==
The Hompesch Hunting Lodge, known locally as Id-Dar tal-Kaċċa, is located on a main road in Naxxar that leads to San Pawl tat-Tarġa. In the area are also located a chapel and a statue both of which are dedicated to St. Paul; and The Stone Column which stands on the site of a former medieval chapel that was also dedicated to St. Paul. The Hompesch Hunting Lodge is found very close to Gauci Tower and Captain's Tower also found in the parameters of Naxxar. Located in front of the building is a public garden.

== History ==
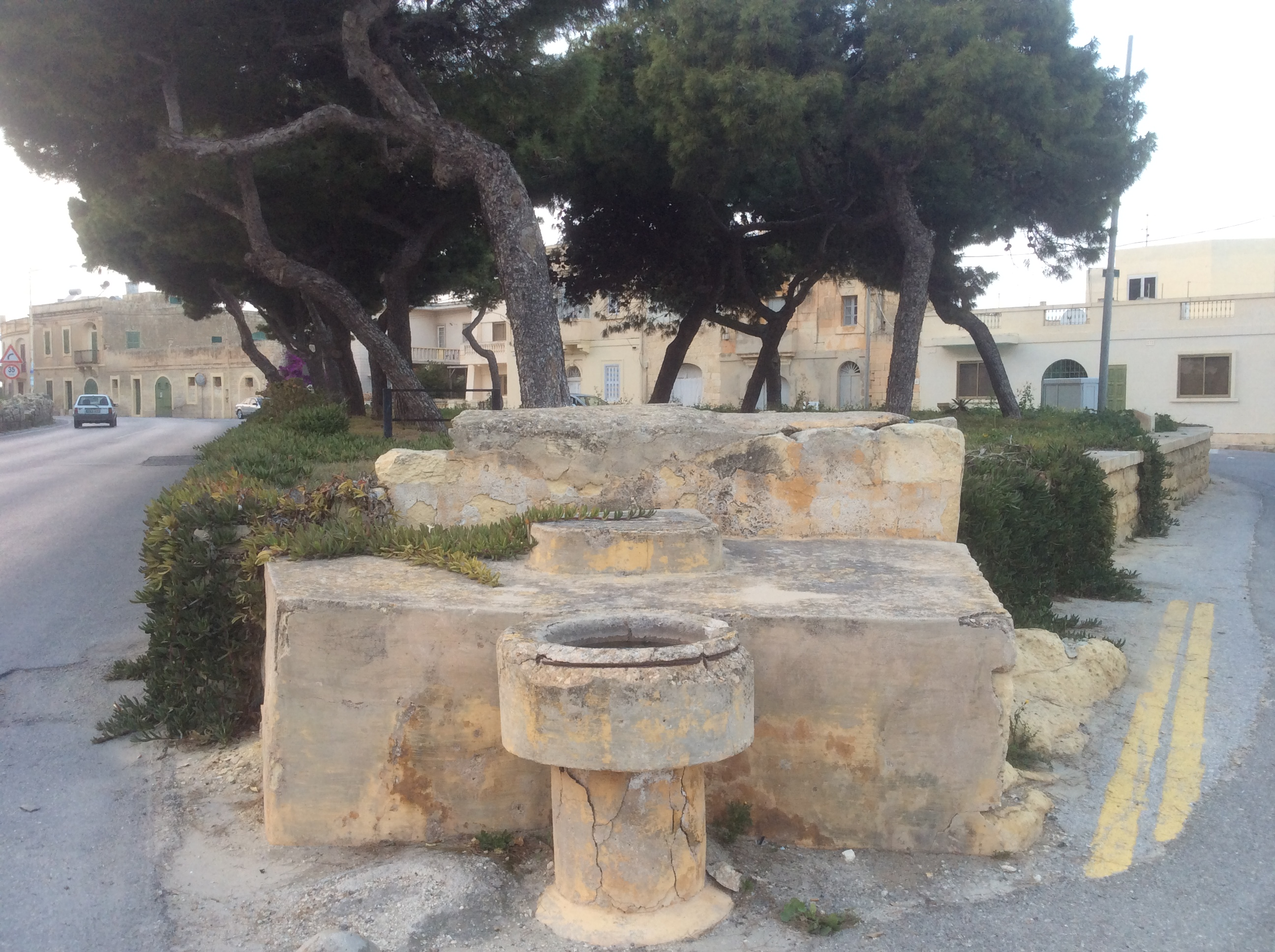
The public garden, and the hunting lodge at far

The Hompesch Hunting Lodge was built with the expense and on the request of ruling Grand Master of the Order of St. John, Ferdinand von Hompesch zu Bolheim. Naxxar was a common hunting place in the 18th century. Other periodic hunting lodges in Naxxar existed on the grounds of Palazzo Parisio and Palazzo Nasciaro however these were redeveloped into aristocratic palaces. Hompesch Hunting Lodge was built in the 18th century and remains mostly unaltered to when it was built except to the deterioration of its architecture.

== Architecture ==
The hunting lodge is modest in its architecture. It is in fact described as a "small house". It is built according to local vernacular Maltese buildings. It features a main door leading to the entry of the house and another arched wider door which was used as a horse stable both on the ground floor façade. On the first floor façade it features a modest window with modest stone decorative design and a balcony. The balcony appears to have lost its original design and today is plastered in cement. The building is in a dilapidated state and is in need of restoration. A post was installed in front of the façade by the Naxxar Local Council which gives little information about the building. The post refers to the building in Maltese as Id-Dar tal-Kaċċa.

The inscription on the post says:

The Hunting Lodge
This small house was the hunting lodge of Grandmaster Ferdinand von
Hompesch, the last Grand Master in Malta.
Id-Dar tal-Kaċċa

== See also ==
- Ta' Cisju Farmhouse
