= Qalet Marku Redoubt =

- Ridott ta' Qalet Marku
- Naxxar, Malta
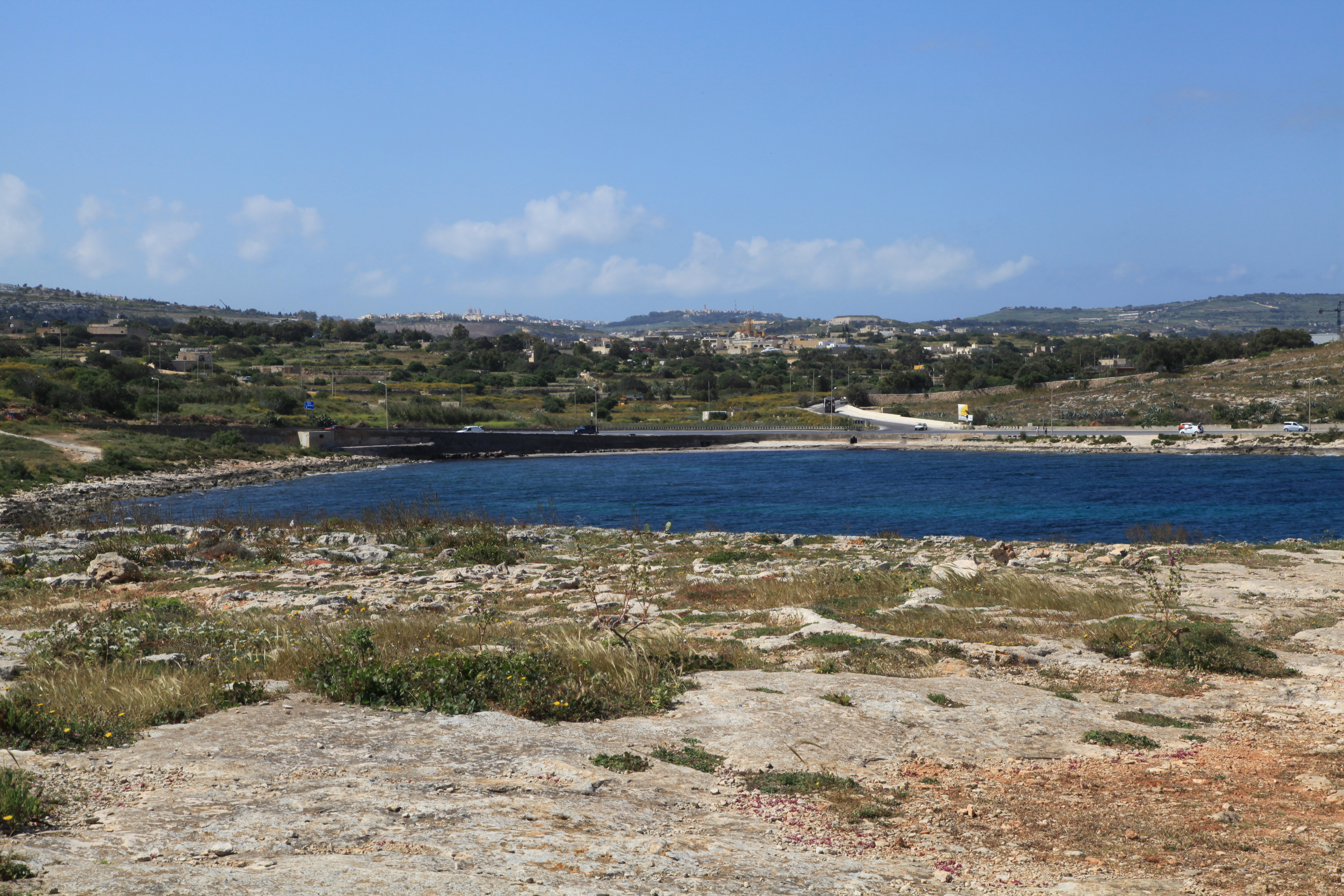
- View of the coast road from Qalet Marku peninsula, with the site of the redoubt on the left.

Site information
- Type: Redoubt
- Owner: Government of Malta
- Condition: Remains buried under modern road

Location
- Coordinates: 35°56′35.1″N 14°27′3.1″E

Site history
- Built: 1715–1716
- Built by: Order of Saint John
- Materials: Limestone
- Fate: Demolished

Qalet Marku Redoubt (Maltese: Ridott ta' Qalet Marku) was a redoubt in the limits of Naxxar, Malta. It was built in 1715–1716 by the Order of Saint John as one of a series of coastal fortifications around the Maltese Islands. It was demolished to make way for the coast road; its remains are possibly still buried under the road.

== History ==
Qalet Marku Redoubt was built in 1715–1716 as part of the first building programme of redoubts in Malta. The nearest fortifications to the redoubt were Għallis Battery to the northwest and Qalet Marku Battery to the east. Both these batteries have now largely been destroyed, but some remains still survive.

The redoubt originally consisted of a pentagonal platform with a low parapet. A rectangular blockhouse was located at the centre of its gorge.

The redoubt was demolished to make way for the Baħar iċ-Ċagħaq–Salina coast road. Its remains are probably still buried under the surface of the road. Part of the structure can still be seen protruding from beneath the road, although it is encased in concrete.
