= Qalet Marku Battery =

Artillery battery in Malta

- Batterija ta' Qalet Marku
- Baħar iċ-Ċagħaq, Naxxar, Malta
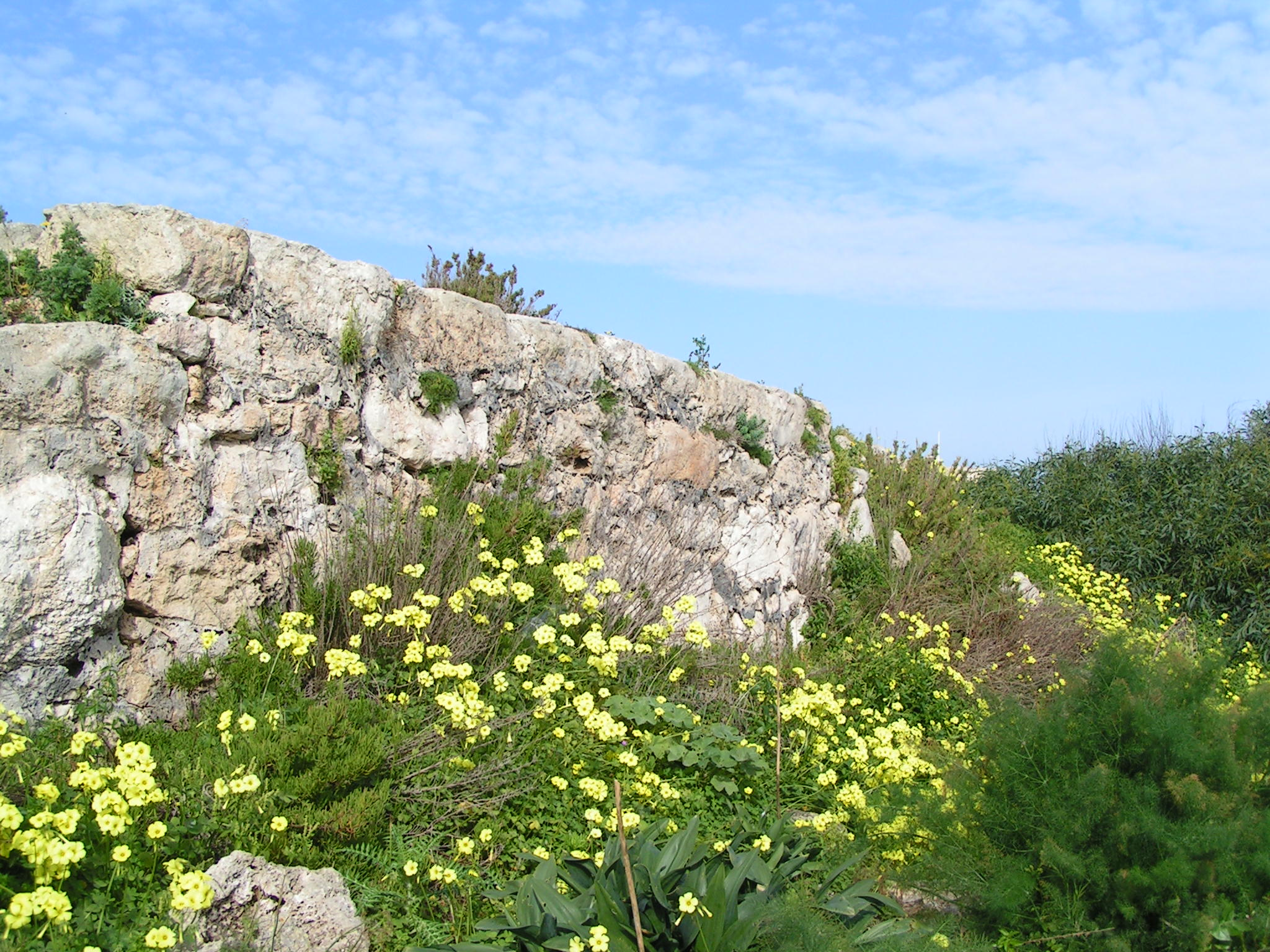
- Remains of Qalet Marku Battery

Site information
- Type: Artillery battery
- Owner: Government of Malta
- Condition: Ruins

Location
- Coordinates: 35°56′42.2″N 14°27′14.1″E

Site history
- Built: 1715–1716
- Built by: Order of Saint John
- Materials: Limestone

Qalet Marku Battery (Maltese: Batterija ta' Qalet Marku), also known as D'Orbeau Battery (Maltese: Batterija D'Orbeau), was an artillery battery in Baħar iċ-Ċagħaq, within the limits of Naxxar, Malta. It was built in 1715–1716 by the Order of Saint John as one of a series of coastal fortifications around the Maltese Islands. The battery has been largely destroyed, but some remains can still be seen.

== History ==
Qalet Marku Battery was built in 1715–1716 as part of the first building programme of coastal batteries in Malta. The nearest fortifications to the battery were Saint Mark's Tower to the north, Qalet Marku Redoubt to the west (now demolished) and Baħar iċ-Ċagħaq Redoubt to the east. Construction of the battery cost 1,165 scudi.

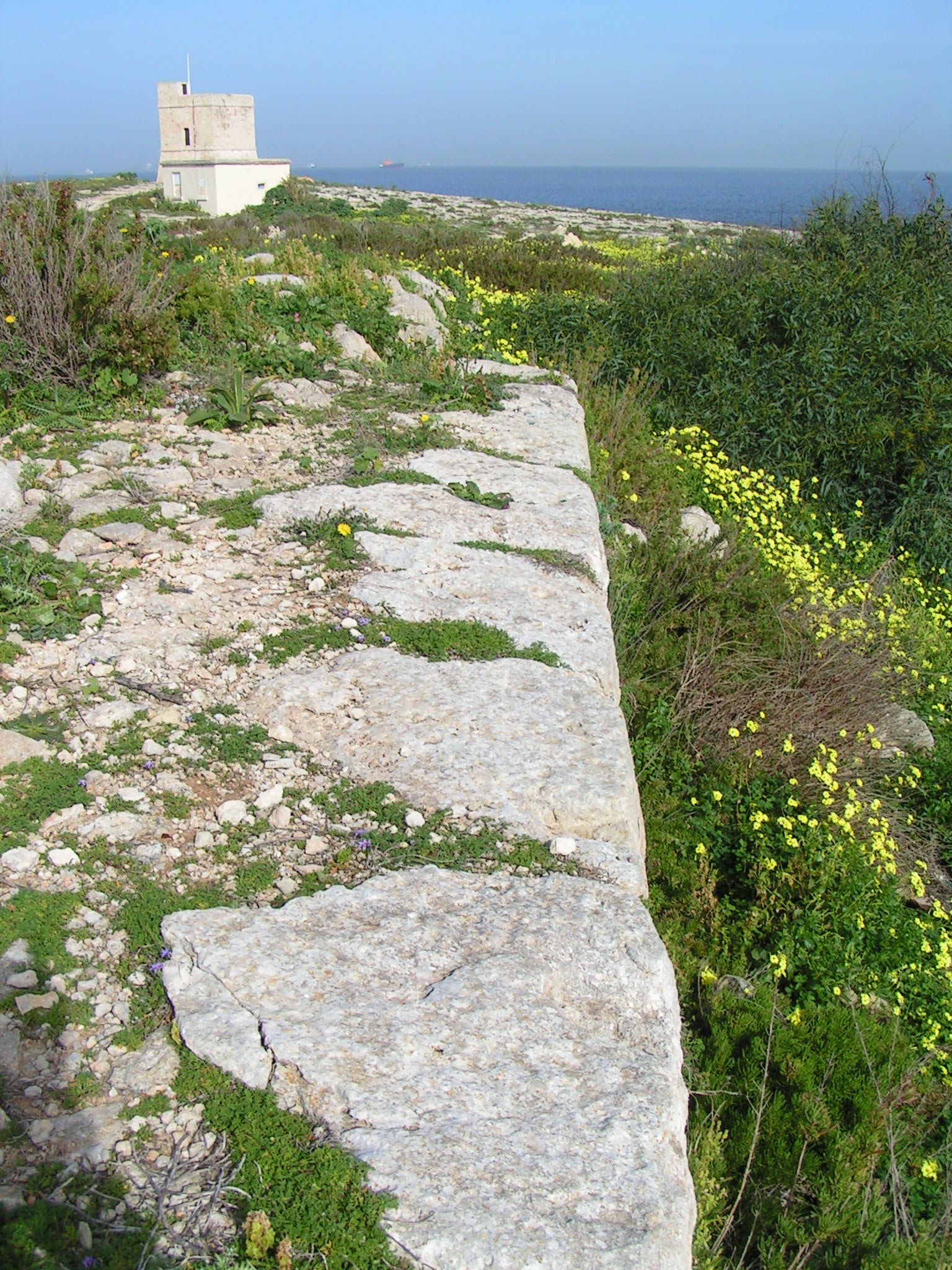
Foundations of Qalet Marku Battery with Saint Mark's Tower in the distance

The battery originally consisted of a pentagonal gun platform with an embrasured parapet wall. A rectangular blockhouse was located in the centre of the battery, while the entire structure was surrounded by a rock-hewn ditch.

The battery was still in good condition until the first half of the 20th century. It seems to have been severely damaged before or during World War II. At this point, a concrete bunker was built on one side of the ruined battery.

== Present day ==
Today, only the ditch and part of the scarp wall are still visible, although they are covered in vegetation. Despite this, the site is considered to have significant archaeological potential if properly excavated and studied.
