= Falca Lines =

Falca Lines Falca Gap Entrenchment
- Trunċiera ta' Falca Gap
- Mġarr and St. Paul's Bay, Malta
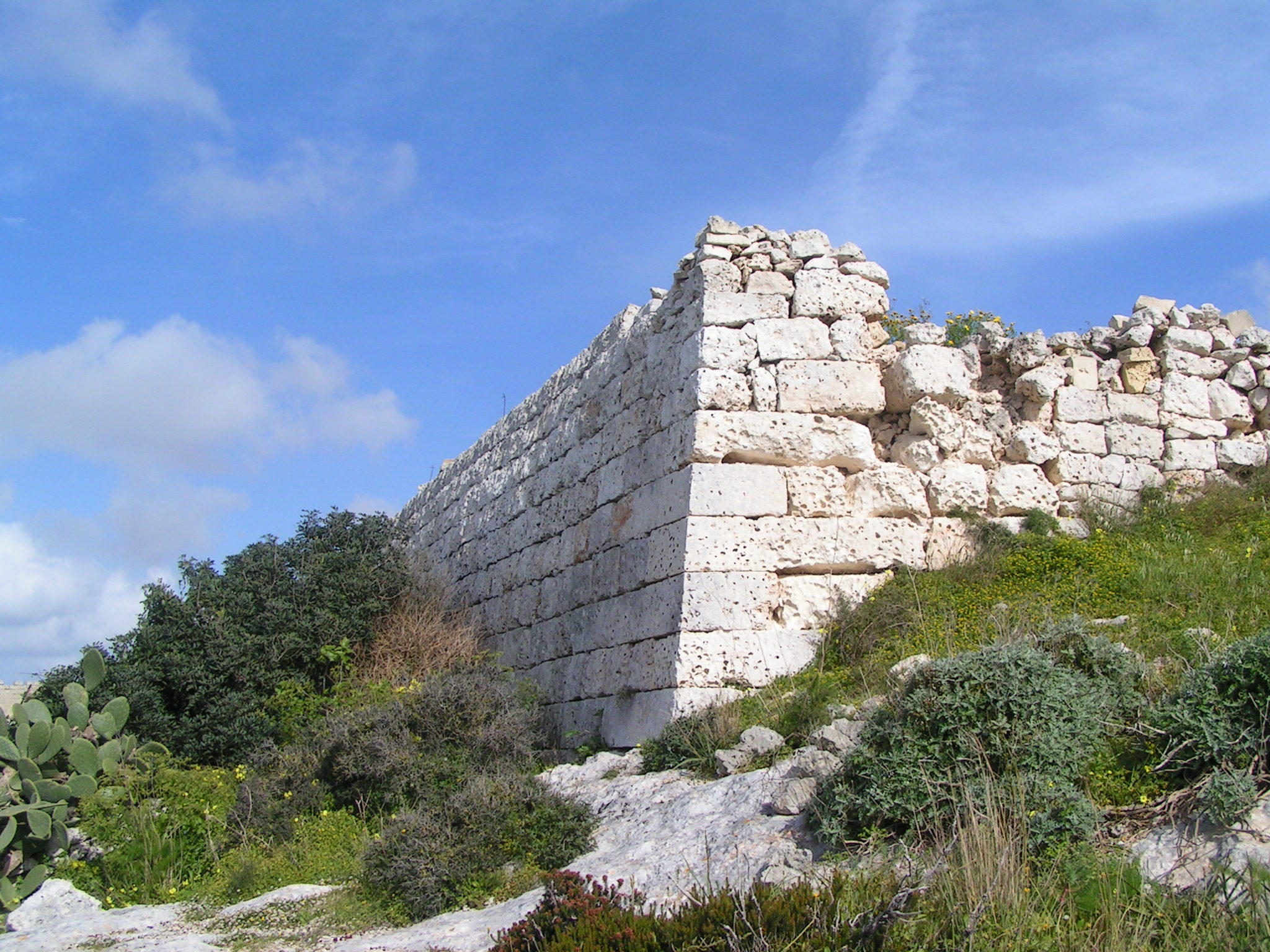
- Ruins of the Falca Gap Entrenchment

Site information
- Type: Entrenchment
- Owner: Government of Malta
- Condition: Ruins

Location
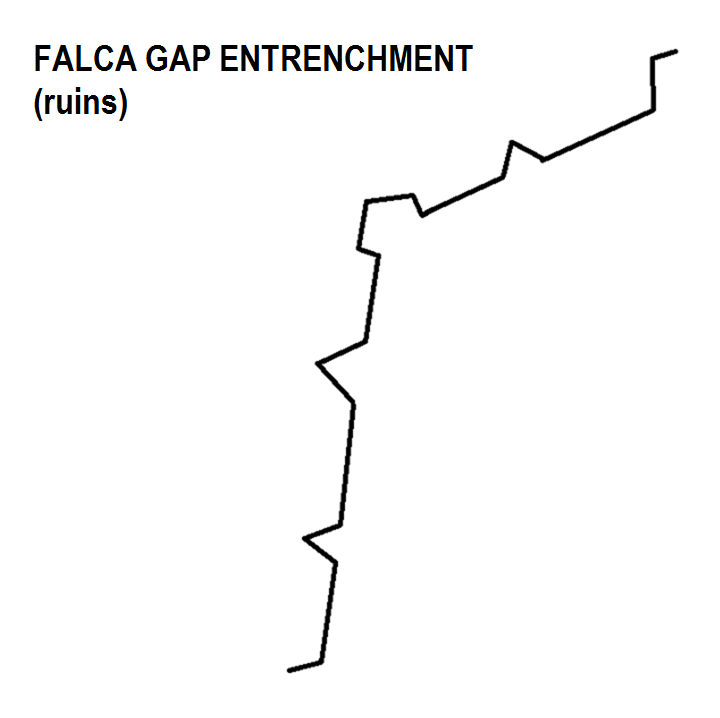
- Map of the Falca Gap Entrenchment
- Coordinates: 35°54′45.7″N 14°24′2.2″E

Site history
- Built: c.1723–1732
- Built by: Order of Saint John
- Materials: Limestone
- Battles/wars: French invasion of Malta

The Falca Lines, also known as the Falca Gap Entrenchment (Maltese: Trunċiera ta' Falca Gap), are an infantry entrenchment in northern Malta, located on the limits of Mġarr and St. Paul's Bay. The lines were built in the 18th century by the Order of Saint John, and today lie in ruins.

== History ==
The Falca Lines are part of a series of fortifications built by the Order of Saint John in the early 18th century. The building programme began in 1714–16 with the construction of coastal batteries, redoubts and coastal entrenchments. By 1722, it was realised that there weren't enough soldiers to man all the fortifications, so the Order decided that in the case of an invasion, they would retreat to the Great Fault, a large fault cutting across northern Malta.

To be able to do this, a series of entrenchments began to be constructed next to the fault. These entrenchments were similar to the ones built around the coastline, with the main difference being that they were inland. The Falca Lines were built to flank what is known as the Falca Gap, while other entrenchments were built at Naxxar, San Pawl tat-Tarġa and other strategic locations.

Construction of the Falca Lines began sometime after 1723, and they were completed by 1732. They consisted of a bastion in the centre, flanked by curtain walls on either side. The curtain walls contained several redans.

The Falca Lines only saw use during the French invasion of Malta in 1798, when they were manned by the Naxxar militia. French forces managed to clear their position easily since they landed from behind the lines.

In the 1880s, the British began to fortify the area once more with the construction of the Victoria Lines (then known as the North West Front). The inclusion of the Falca Lines into the new fortifications was considered, but was eventually discarded since the position was unfavourable. Instead, the British built the Dwejra Lines further south of the Falca Lines.

== Present day ==
Today, the entrenchment lies in ruins. Only one demi-bastion still exists more or less intact and its general outline is still visible. Part of the lines are severed by Triq Sir Temi Zammit, the road leading to Mġarr.
