= Baħar iċ-Ċagħaq Redoubt =

Redoubt in Baħar iċ-Ċagħaq, limits of Naxxar, Malta

- Ridott ta' Baħar iċ-Ċagħaq
- Baħar iċ-Ċagħaq, Naxxar, Malta
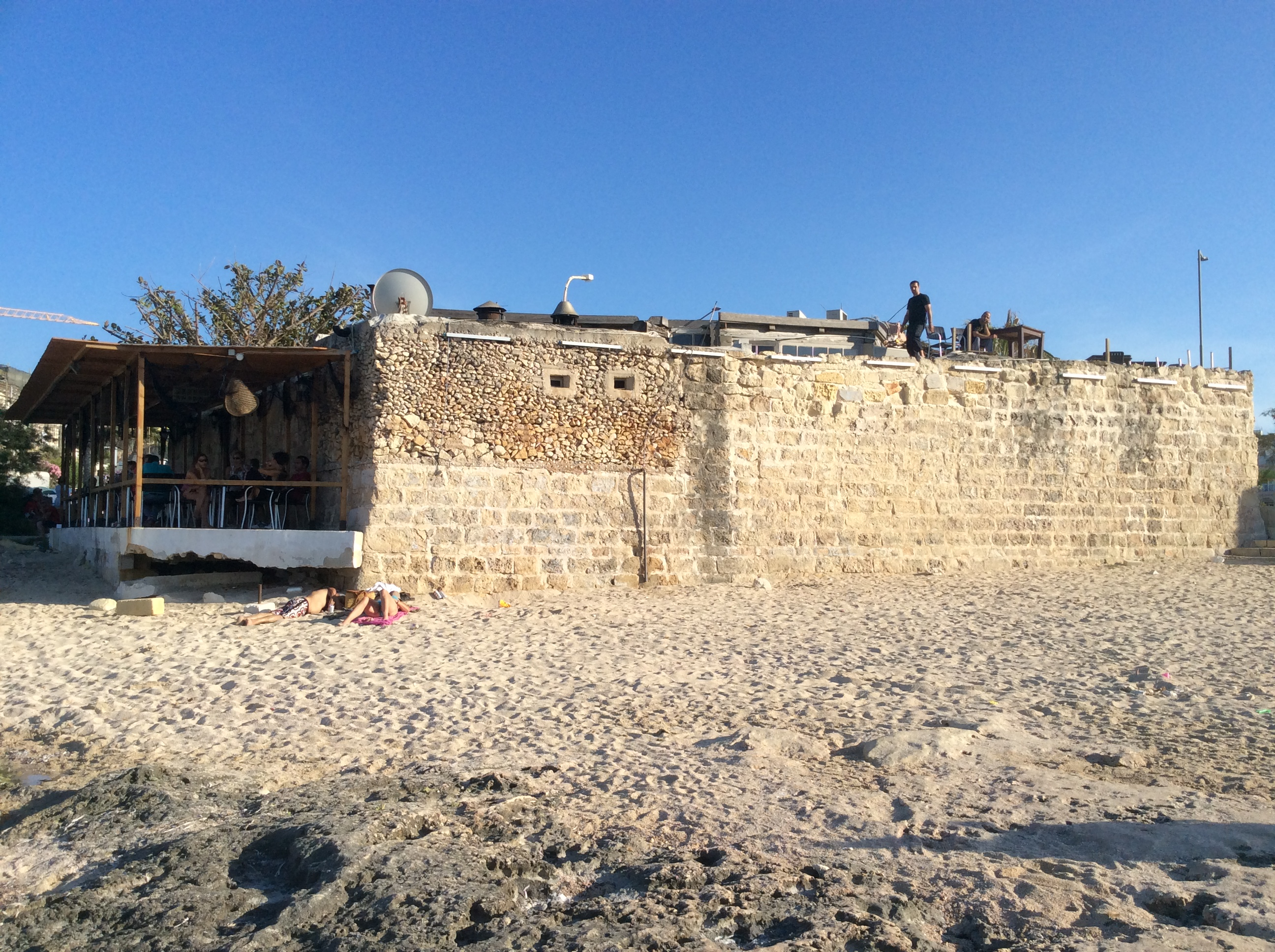
- View of Baħar iċ-Ċagħaq Redoubt from the coast

Site information
- Type: Redoubt
- Owner: Government of Malta
- Controlled by: Private tenant
- Open to the public: Yes (as a bar/restaurant)
- Condition: Intact

Location
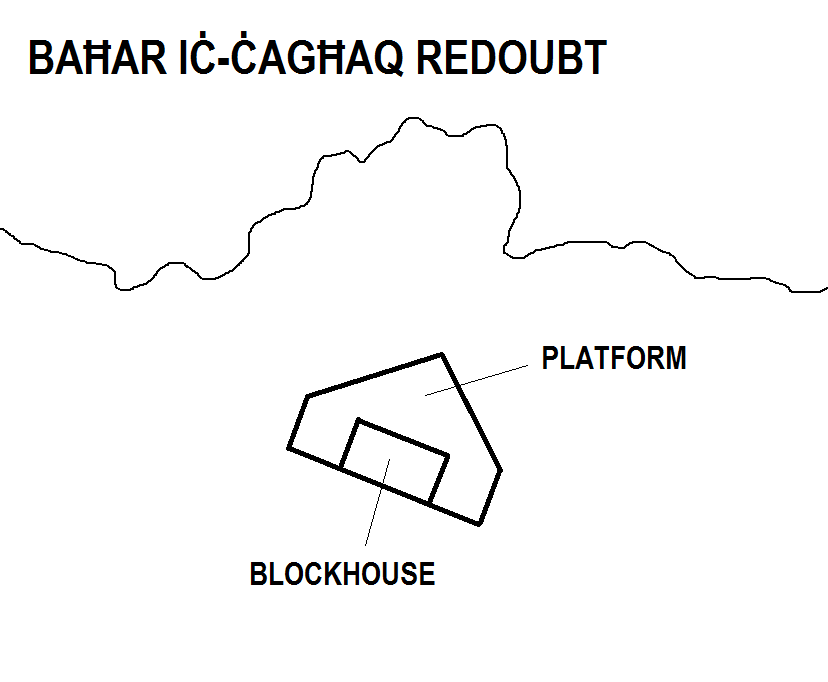
- Map of Baħar iċ-Ċagħaq Redoubt
- Coordinates: 35°56′23.5″N 14°27′20.9″E

Site history
- Built: 1715–1716
- Built by: Order of Saint John
- Materials: Limestone

Baħar iċ-Ċagħaq Redoubt (Maltese: Ridott ta' Baħar iċ-Ċagħaq) is a redoubt in Baħar iċ-Ċagħaq, within the limits of Naxxar, Malta. It was built in 1715–1716 by the Order of Saint John as one of a series of coastal fortifications around the Maltese Islands. Today, the redoubt still exists in relatively good condition.

It is also known as Vendôme Redoubt (Maltese: Ridott ta' Vendôme) or Madliena Redoubt (Maltese: Ridott tal-Madliena).

== History ==
Baħar iċ-Ċagħaq Redoubt was built in 1715–1716 as part of the first building programme of redoubts in Malta. The nearest fortifications to the redoubt were Qalet Marku Battery to the northwest (now demolished) and Madliena Tower to the east. The redoubt was originally linked to the latter tower by an entrenchment, but very little remains of this have survived.

The redoubt consists of a pentagonal platform with short flanks and a low parapet, with a rectangular blockhouse located at the centre of its gorge. The blockhouse is divided into two rooms, with the larger room containing the main entrance.

In World War II, a defensive position was built on the salient of the redoubt.

== Present day ==
Today, the redoubt is still in relatively good condition. It is leased to a private tenant and is used as a bar and restaurant named Las Palmas.

== Gallery ==
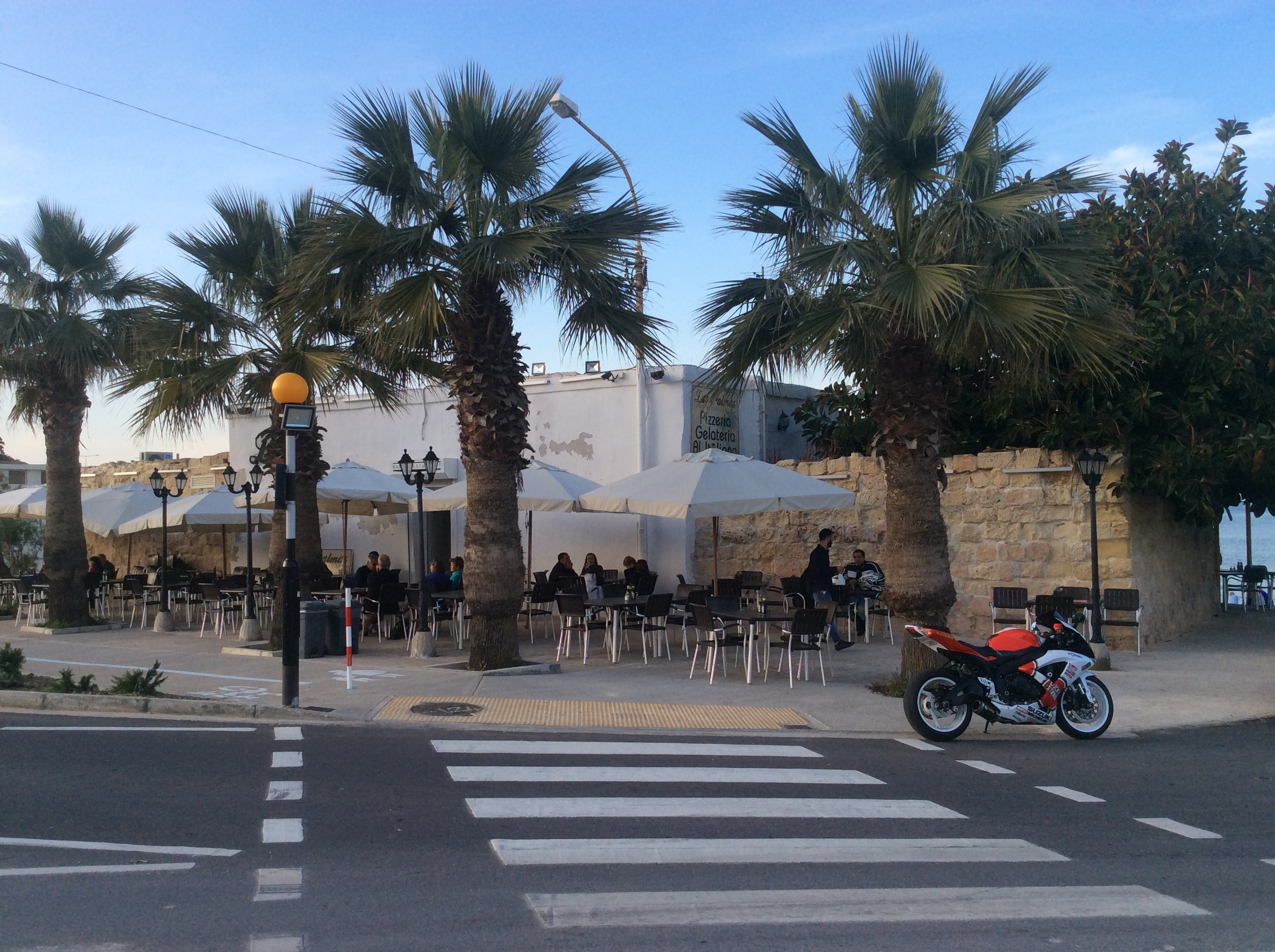
The redoubt as viewed from the landward side. The white building is the blockhouse.

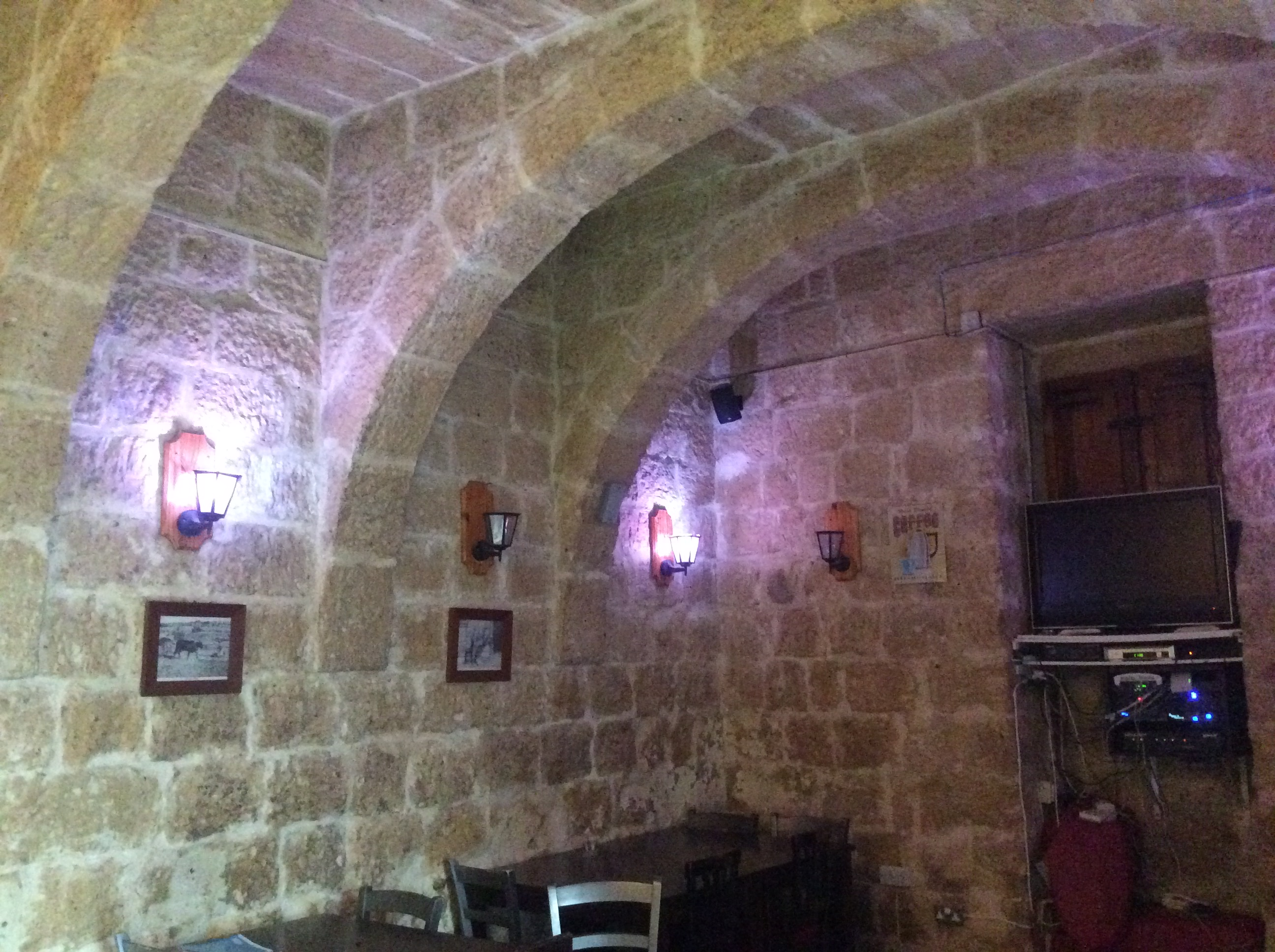
Interior of the redoubt
