= Gauci =

Gauci is a surname in use mainly in the Republic of Malta belonging to one of the most ancient and noble families on the island. It originates from the word Għawdxi (pronounced [ˈɐˤːʊ̯t.ʃɪ]; meaning 'Gozitan'), in reference to a man from Gozo.

According to the Dictionary of American Family Names, it originated in Italy, flourished in Malta and from Malta spread to the UK, US, Canada and Australia with the Maltese diaspora; this would be due to the immigration (and also exile) of large numbers of people from Italy to Malta, although the name still appears in Italy.

However, according to Professor Joseph Aquilina, Malta's foremost specialist in Maltese etymology and author of the encyclopaedic Maltese–English Dictionary, the surname is a Maltese original formation, originating in the medieval notarial transcription of the word "Għawdxi", meaning Gozitan or from the island of Gozo. As such, "Għawdxi" is a nickname frequently given to Gozitans living or working in Malta. This origin would classify Italian holders of the surname as descendants of Maltese immigrants, rather than vice versa.

Bearers of the surname Gauci belong to one of the most ancient and noble families of Malta. The family hold the title of Marquis of Ghajn Qajjed, first granted to Dr. Gerolamo Delicata by Grant Master Emanuel de Rohan-Polduc. In 1796, the "Feudal Tribute" is "a bouquet of flowers on the feast of St. Martin, Pope (13 November) every year". The title in 1981 was held by Rev. Fr. Dictor Formosa-Gauci S.J.,, who is also "Count of Santa Sofia". Other notable bearers of this name include Charles A. Gauci, fellow of the Malta Heraldic Society and archivist to the Imperial Paleologue family.

In 1548, Francesco Gauci built Gauci Tower to protect his family.

== Notable people ==
- Charles Gauci (born 1952), Australian Catholic bishop
- Darren Gauci (born 1965), Australian professional jockey
- Joe Gauci (born 2000), Australian soccer player
- John A. Gauci-Maistre (born 1947), Maltese businessman
- Kylie Gauci (born 1985), Australian wheelchair basketball player
- Lauren Gauci (born 1996), Australian rules football player
- Marilena Gauci (born 1991), Maltese politician
- Marvin Gauci, Maltese chef
- Maxim Gauci (1774–1854), Maltese painter and lithographer
- Miriam Gauci (born 1957), Maltese singer
- Natalie Gauci (born 1981), Australian musician and singer-songwriter
- Paul Gauci (fl.1830s–1860s), English lithographer, son of Maxim Gauci
- Redento Maria Gauci (1920–1978), Maltese Catholic prelate
- Sandra Gauci (born 1979), Maltese politician
- Tony Gauci (1944–2016), Maltese court witness
