= Toni Bajada =

Toni Bajada was a Maltese spy for the Knights of Saint John during the Great Siege of Malta. He was born in Naxxar.

== Siege of Malta ==
The most famous of the Maltese spies, Bajada is said to have learned the Turkish language during years of captivity. Disguised as a Turk, he infiltrated the enemy camps and along with four other Maltese spies of the era (Andrew Zahra, James Pace, Anton Cascia, Francis Xerri), played a crucial role in intelligence gathering for the Christian side.

Personally chosen for the task by Grandmaster Jean de Valette, Bajada also became famous for swimming at length to carry secret messages in and out of the besieged cities of Birgu and Senglea.

== Legacy ==
Toni Bajada continues to enjoy fame and respect as a folk hero in Malta, with streets named in his honour in Valletta, St Paul's Bay and Naxxar.

== In popular culture ==
Toni Bajada is the main protagonist of the book Toni Bajada The Maltese Messenger of the Grand Master (2001) by Maltese author Emilio Lombardi.
