= Għallis Battery =

- Batterija tal-Għallis
- Magħtab, Naxxar, Malta

Site information
- Type: Artillery battery
- Owner: Government of Malta
- Condition: Sparse remains

Location
- Coordinates: 35°56′57.9″N 14°26′45.6″E

Site history
- Built: 1715–1716
- Built by: Order of Saint John
- Materials: Limestone

Għallis Battery (Maltese: Batterija tal-Għallis), also known as Pondéves Battery, was an artillery battery in Magħtab, within the limits of Naxxar, Malta. It was built in 1715–1716 by the Order of Saint John as one of a series of coastal fortifications around the Maltese Islands. The battery has been mostly ruined, but some debris can still be seen.

== History ==
Għallis Battery was built in 1715–1716 as part of the first building programme of coastal batteries in Malta. The nearest fortifications to the battery were Għallis Tower to the west and Qalet Marku Redoubt to the southeast (now demolished).

The battery had a semi-circular gun platform. It was to be surrounded by a ditch, but it was only partially excavated and was never completed.

In World War II, an emplacement was built on the remains of the blockhouse, possibly for a small field gun.

== Present day ==
Today, very little remains of the battery survive. Part of one wall of the blockhouse still exists, the partially excavated ditch, and the general outline of the battery's foundations can also be seen.
