= Naxxar Entrenchment =

- Trunċiera fin-Naxxar
- Naxxar, Malta
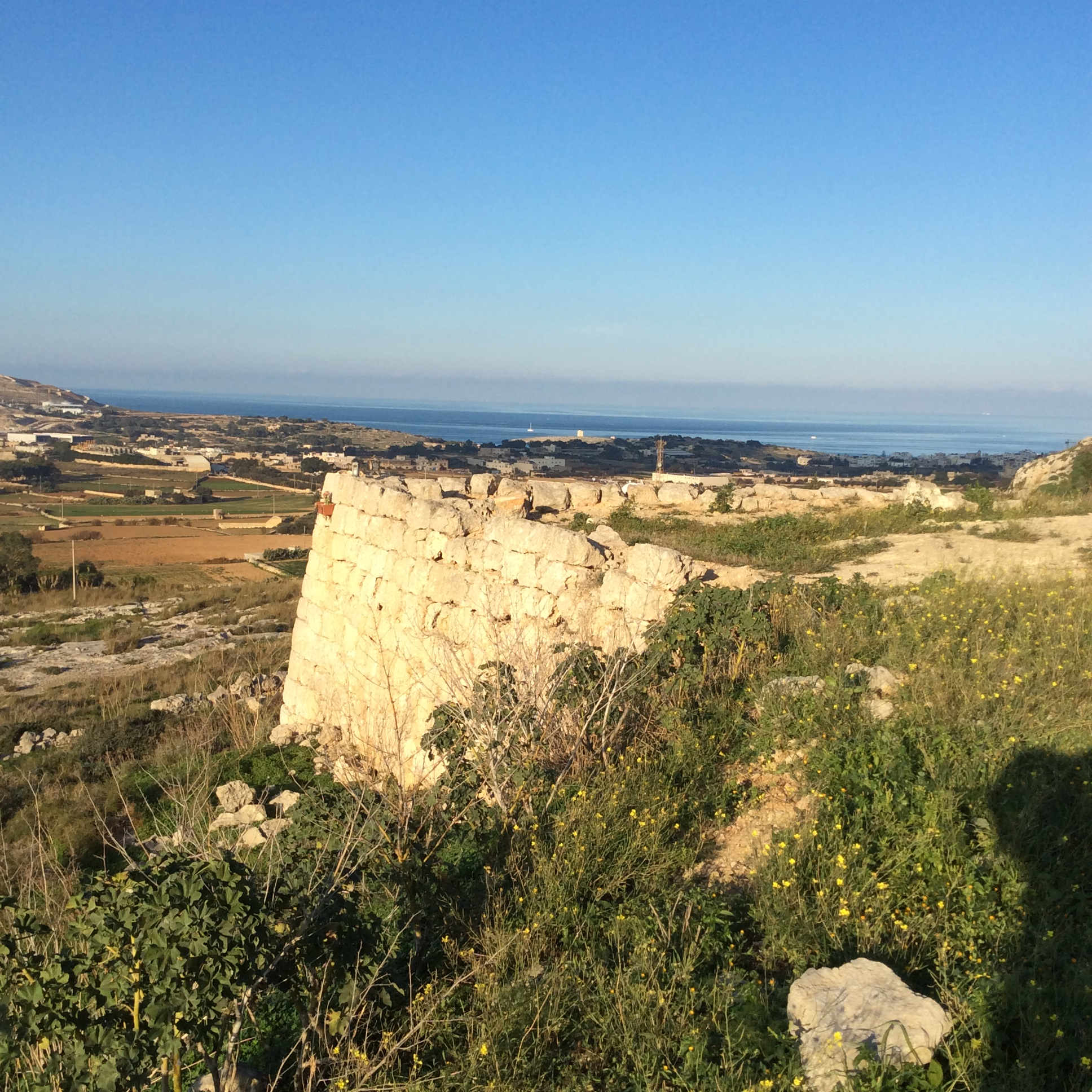
- One of the redans of the Naxxar Entrenchment

Site information
- Type: Entrenchment
- Owner: Government of Malta
- Condition: Ruins

Location
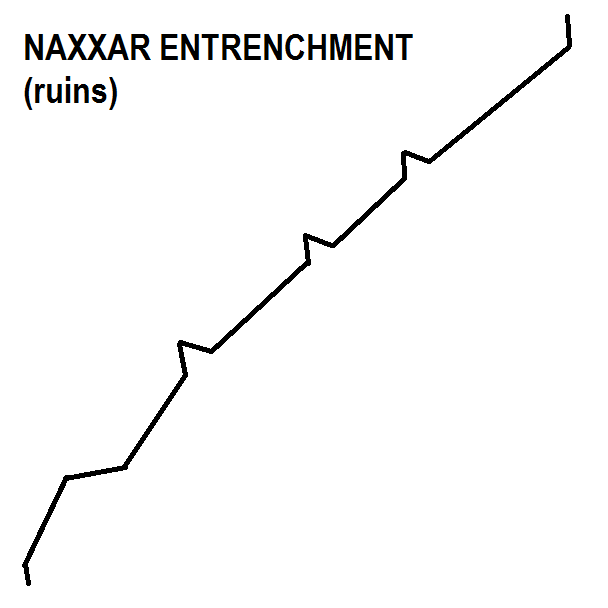
- Map of the Naxxar Entrenchment
- Coordinates: 35°55′27.5″N 14°26′18″E

Site history
- Built: 1722
- Built by: Order of Saint John
- Materials: Limestone

The Naxxar Entrenchment (Maltese: Trunċiera tan-Naxxar) is an infantry entrenchment in Naxxar, Malta, which was built in the 18th century by the Order of Saint John. Today, it lies in ruins but is still the best preserved inland entrenchment in Malta. It is a list monument of the NICPMI.

== History ==
The Naxxar Entrenchment is part of a series of fortifications built by the Order of Saint John in the early 18th century. The building programme began in 1714-16 with the construction of coastal batteries, redoubts and coastal entrenchments. By 1722, it was realized that there weren't enough soldiers to man all the fortifications, so the Order decided that in the case of an invasion, they would retreat to the Great Fault, a large fault cutting across northern Malta.

To be able to do this, construction was begun on a series of entrenchments close to the fault. These entrenchments were similar to the ones built around the coastline, with the main difference being that they were inland. The Naxxar Entrenchment was built on the high ground of the Great Fault, while other entrenchments were built at Falca Gap, San Pawl tat-Tarġa and other strategic locations.

The entrenchment, which consisted of four redans linked together by curtain walls, was built in 1722. It was built in the pietra a secco manner. A ditch was also excavated along the entrenchment.

The entrenchment was incorporated into the Victoria Lines by the British.

== Present day ==
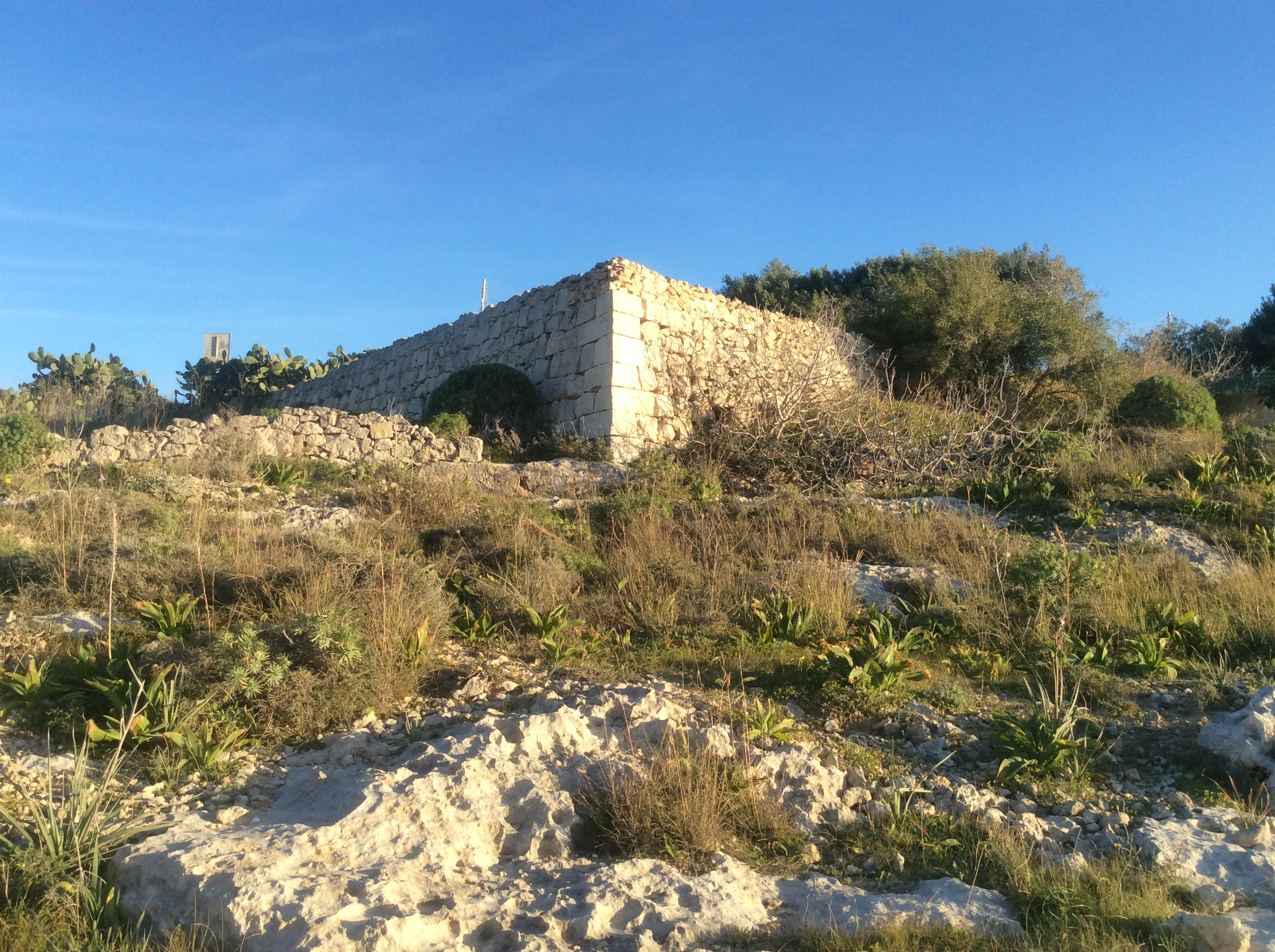
One of the redans

Today, the entrenchment lies in ruins, but it is considered to be the best preserved inland entrenchment in Malta. Most of the curtain walls had collapsed by the 1970s, but the redans remain largely intact. Part of the entrenchment is breached by Triq is-Salina, the road leading to Magħtab and Salina.
