= Entrenchment (fortification) =

Type of fortification

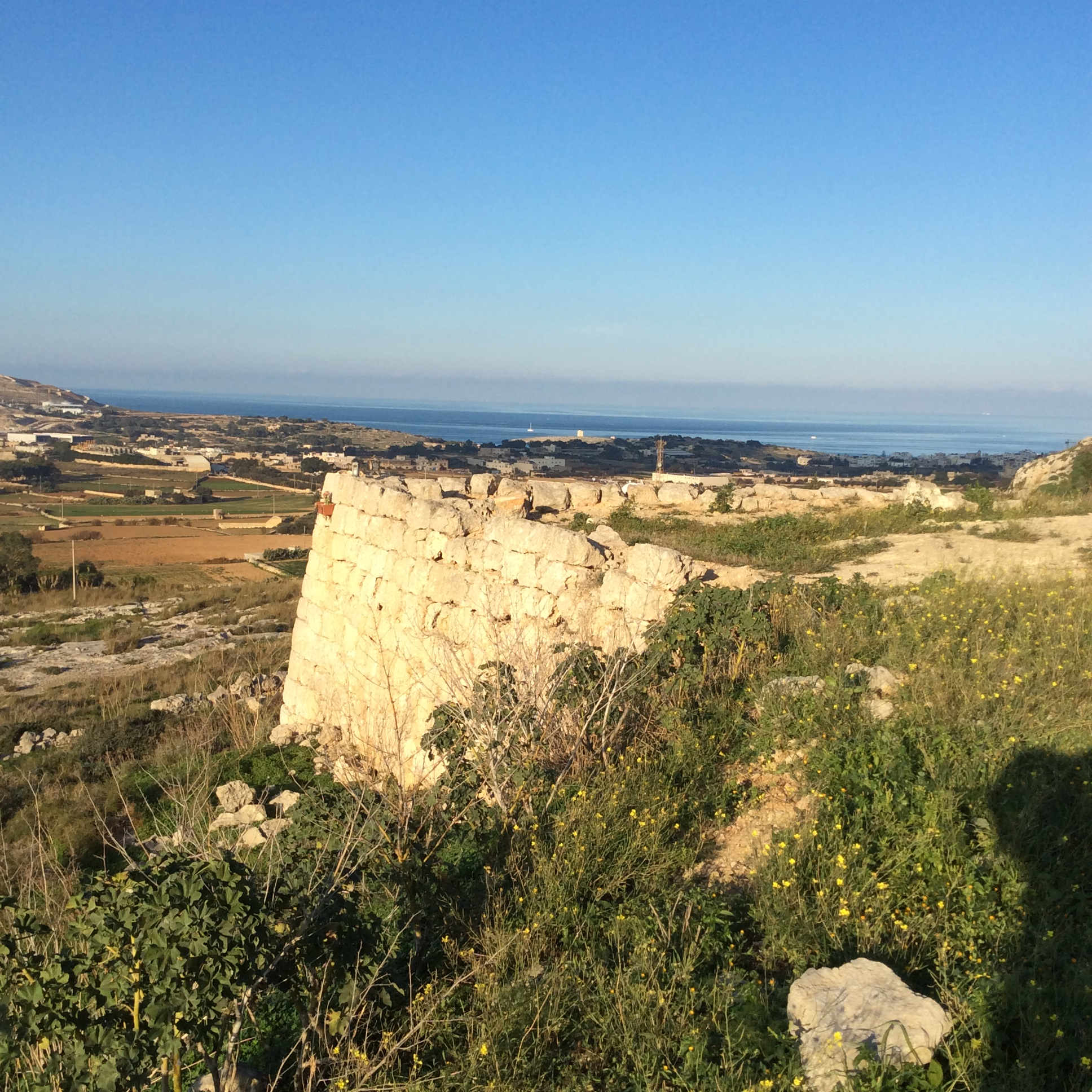
A redan within the Naxxar Entrenchment, an inland entrenchment in Naxxar, Malta

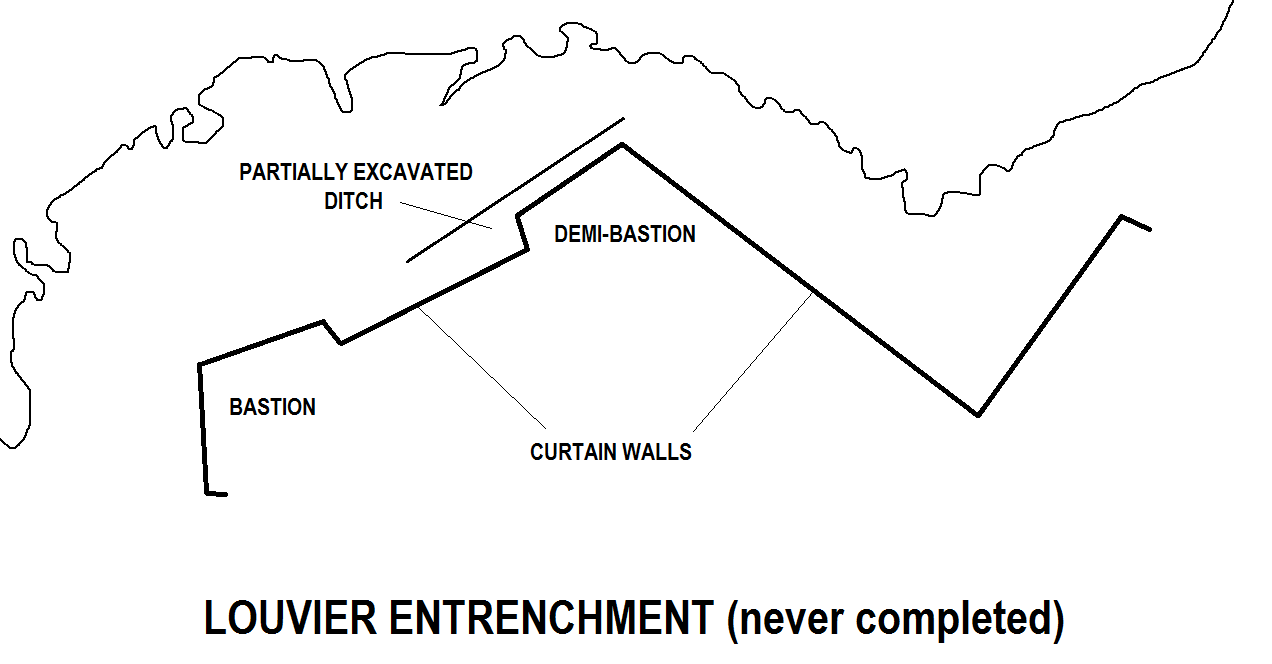
Map of the Louvier Entrenchment, a coastal entrenchment in Mellieħa, Malta

In fortification, the term entrenchment (Italian: trincieramento, Maltese: trunċiera) can refer to either a secondary line of defence within a larger fortification (better known as a retrenchment), or an enceinte designed to provide cover for infantry, having a layout similar to a city wall but on a smaller scale. The latter usually consisted of curtain walls and bastions or redans, and was sometimes also protected by a ditch.

In the 18th century, the Knights Hospitaller built a number of coastal and inland entrenchments as part of the fortifications of Malta. Further entrenchments were built in Malta by insurgents during the blockade of 1798–1800, in order to prevent the French from launching a counterattack.
