= Gauci Tower =

Tower in Malta

- Torri Gauci
- Naxxar, Malta
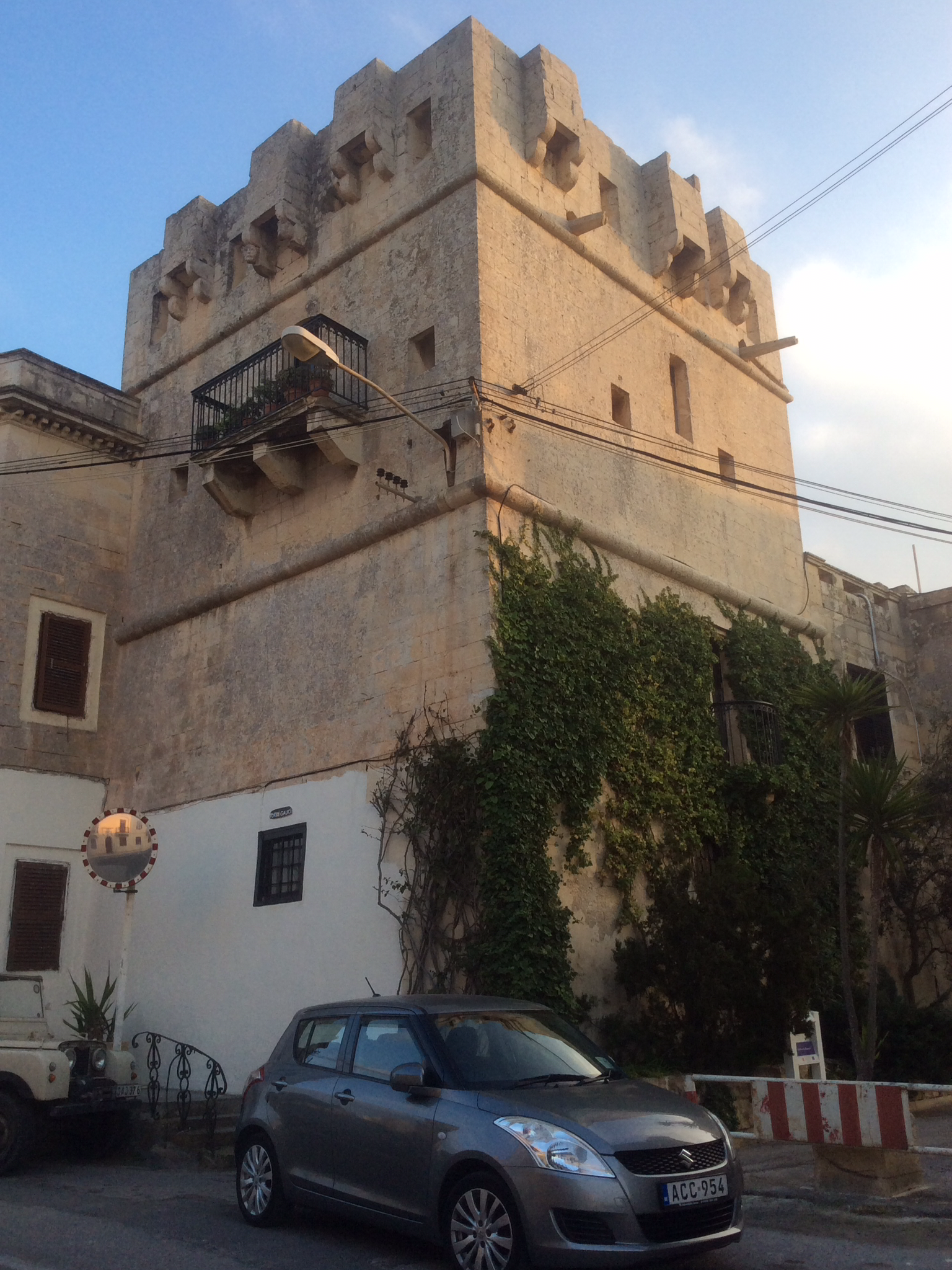
- View of Gauci Tower

Site information
- Type: Tower
- Owner: Private
- Open to the public: No
- Condition: Intact

Location
- Coordinates: 35°55′12″N 14°26′33″E

Site history
- Built: before 1548
- Built by: Gauci family
- Materials: Limestone

Gauci Tower (Maltese: Torri Gauci, Italian: Torre Gauci) is a tower in Naxxar, Malta. It was built before 1548 by the Gauci family.

== History ==
Gauci Tower was built sometime before 1548 by Francesco Gauci to protect his family from corsair raids. The construction cost a total of 400 scudi. In 1548, it was requisitioned by the Order of Saint John, who ruled the Maltese Islands, to house the Captain of the Naxxar militia. Gauci petitioned against this move, and the tower was returned to him on 16 May 1548. Eventually, the Order built the nearby Captain's Tower to house the Captain of the militia.

The tower is quite small, and has a square plan, with its lower half being slightly more pronounced. A number of box machicolations are located at the crest of its high parapet. It also has musketry loopholes and vision slits. A townhouse, also built by Gauci, is located next to the tower.

By the late 17th century, Gauci Tower had lost most of its defensive value. The Chapel of St. Paul was built in front of it in 1696.
