= Baħar iċ-Ċagħaq =

- Administrative Committee
- Kumitat Amministrattiv ta' Baħar iċ-Ċagħaq
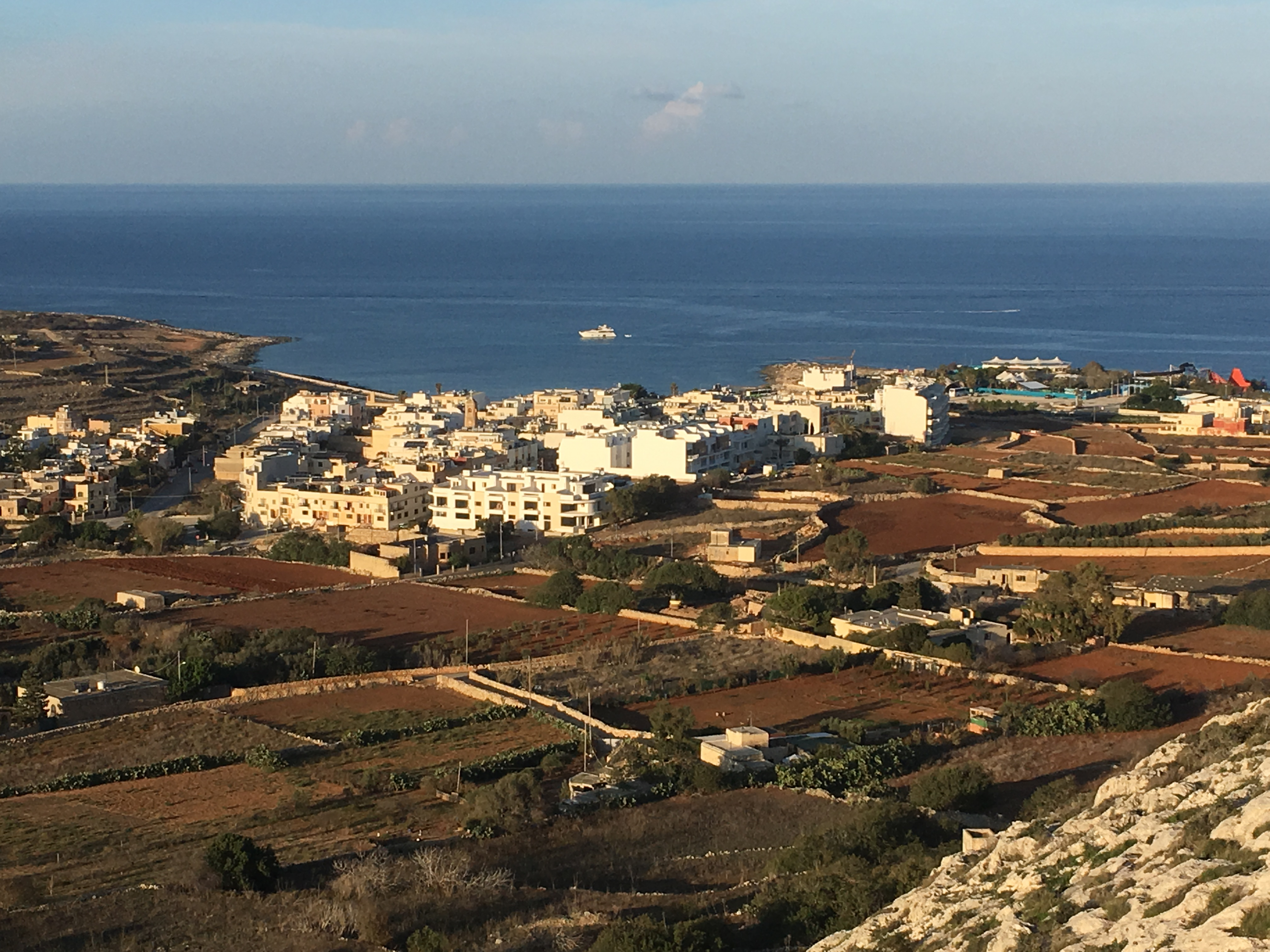
- View of Baħar iċ-Ċagħaq

- Location within Malta
- Coordinates: 35.938787°N 14.453725°E
- Country: Malta
- Island: Malta Island
- Suburb of: Naxxar

Population
  - Total: 1,250
- Time zone: UTC+1 (CET)
  - Summer (DST): UTC+2 (CEST)
- Postal code: NXR
- Dialing code: 356
- Day of festa: Our Lady of Angels
- Website: Official website

Baħar iċ-Ċagħaq is an urban village in Malta situated between the limits of Madliena, Magħtab, Għargħur and Pembroke. The area is situated at the mouth of the island's longest valley called 'Wied il-Kbir'. The name Baħar iċ-Ċagħaq in Maltese can be translated to 'sea of pebbles' in English. It has a population of approximately 1,250 people.

== History and facilities ==
Baħar iċ-Ċagħaq is named after a long stretch of rocky coast characterised by a large number of pebbles and sharp rocks. The area was used as a camping site by British forces during the British colonial period of the islands.

Two century-old chapels are found in the area, one of which has been abandoned. A modern central parish church and Franciscan retreat house are also located in the village. Opposite Baħar iċ-Ċagħaq is a marine entertainment centre which also has a dolphin show. Baħar iċ-Ċagħaq also contains a small number of bars and restaurants and a boy scout camping site.

The village was for much of the late twentieth century home to the White Rocks tourist complex. However, by the early 21st century this had fallen into disrepair and was no longer used. A proposal to convert the complex into a sports complex was announced by the Maltese government in 2010, but little progress had been made by June 2011. In November 2025, the central government announced the future construction of a national park in the area.

When Local Councils were established, the central government decided that the village should form part of the Local Council of Naxxar. However, the parish district of the town falls under the neighbouring Għargħur Local Council. In the last 15 years the land development increased by threefold and Maltese people continue to purchase and develop property in the area.

== Malta's sound mirror ==
The only sound mirror built outside of the UK is found near Baħar iċ-Ċagħaq at Magħtab. These buildings were early warning pre-radar systems based on sound built before World War II. Malta's sound mirror would capture distant sounds from (potentially enemy) seacraft engines far out at sea, before they become visible on the horizon.

== Zones in Baħar iċ-Ċagħaq ==
- Qalet Marku
- San Ġwann Evanġelista
- Wied il-Faħam
- White Rocks

== Transport ==
Baħar iċ-Ċagħaq is located on the Triq il-Kosta (Coast Road), Triq tal-Madliena (Madliena Road) and Triq Sant' Andrija (St Andrew's Road).

The village is served by three bus routes linking it to Valletta, Sliema and Buġibba.
