= Captain's Tower =

Tower in Naxxar, Malta

- Torri tal-Kaptan
- Naxxar, Malta
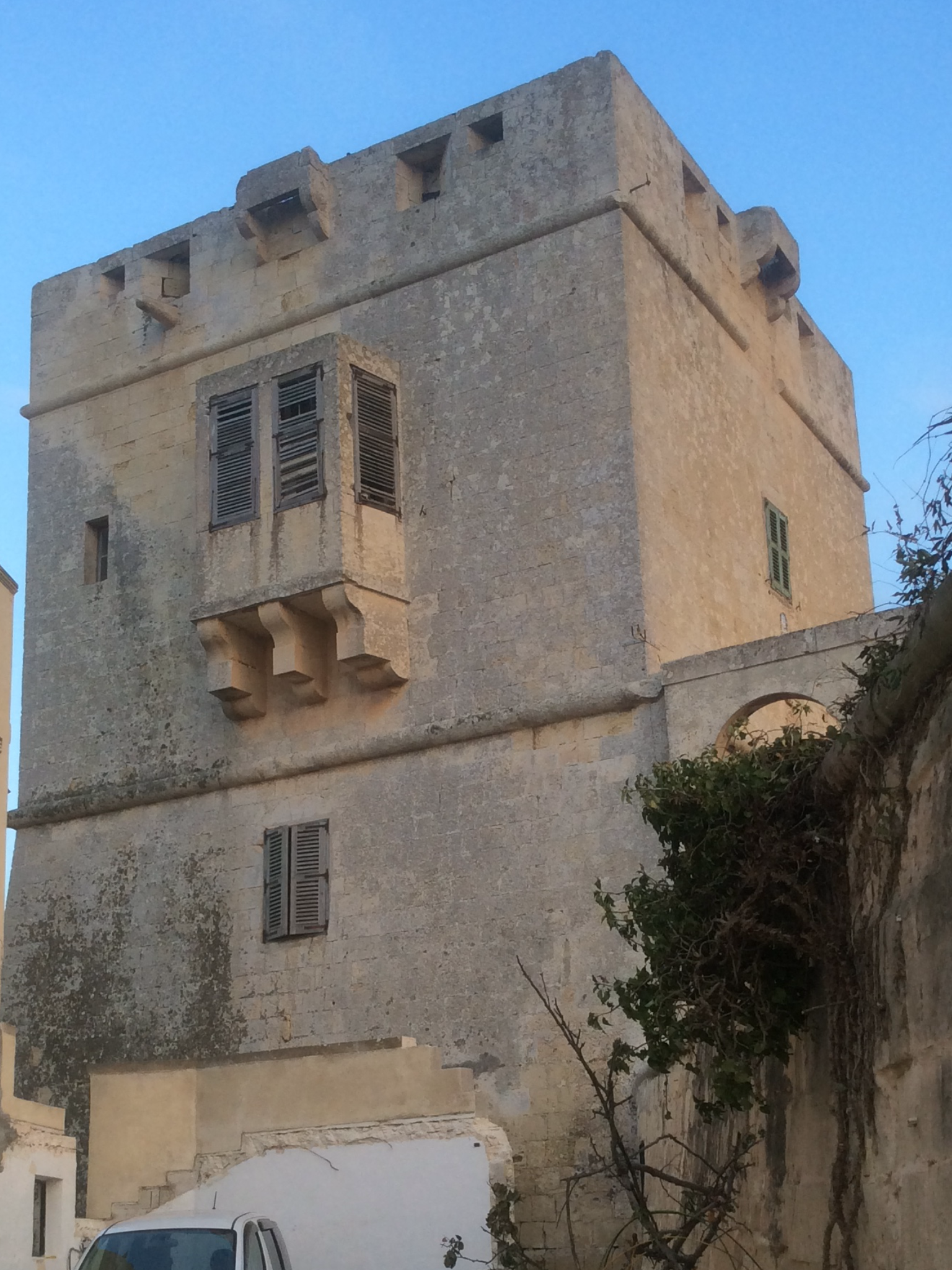
- View of the Captain's Tower

Site information
- Type: Tower
- Owner: Private
- Open to the public: No
- Condition: Intact

Site history
- Built: c. 1550s
- Built by: Order of Saint John
- Materials: Limestone

Captain's Tower (Maltese: Torri tal-Kaptan) is a tower in Naxxar, Malta. It was built sometime after 1548 by the Order of Saint John. Today, the tower is in good condition.

== History ==
The Captain's Tower was built by the Order of Saint John to house the captain of the Naxxar militia. It was built during the tenure of Jean Parisot de Valette, after the Order of St. John unsuccessfully tried to requisition the nearby Gauci Tower in 1548 to serve as the captain's residence. The Captain's Tower is one of the earliest Hospitaller fortifications in Malta.

The tower's design is similar to that of the Gauci Tower as well as earlier Hospitaller towers in Rhodes. The tower consists of a square plan with three floors. It contains a number of box machicolations, and a columbaria which housed carrier pigeons to relay messages to Mdina or Valletta.

The tower and the house built with it were used as a temporary hospital during the plague epidemic of 1675-6.

The Captain's Tower lost most of its defensive value by the late 17th century, due to the construction of new fortifications such as the Wignacourt towers, Lascaris towers and De Redin towers.

== Present day ==
Today, the Captain's Tower is in good condition. It is privately owned and is not open to the public.
