= Naxxar =

Naxxar In-Naxxar
- Local council
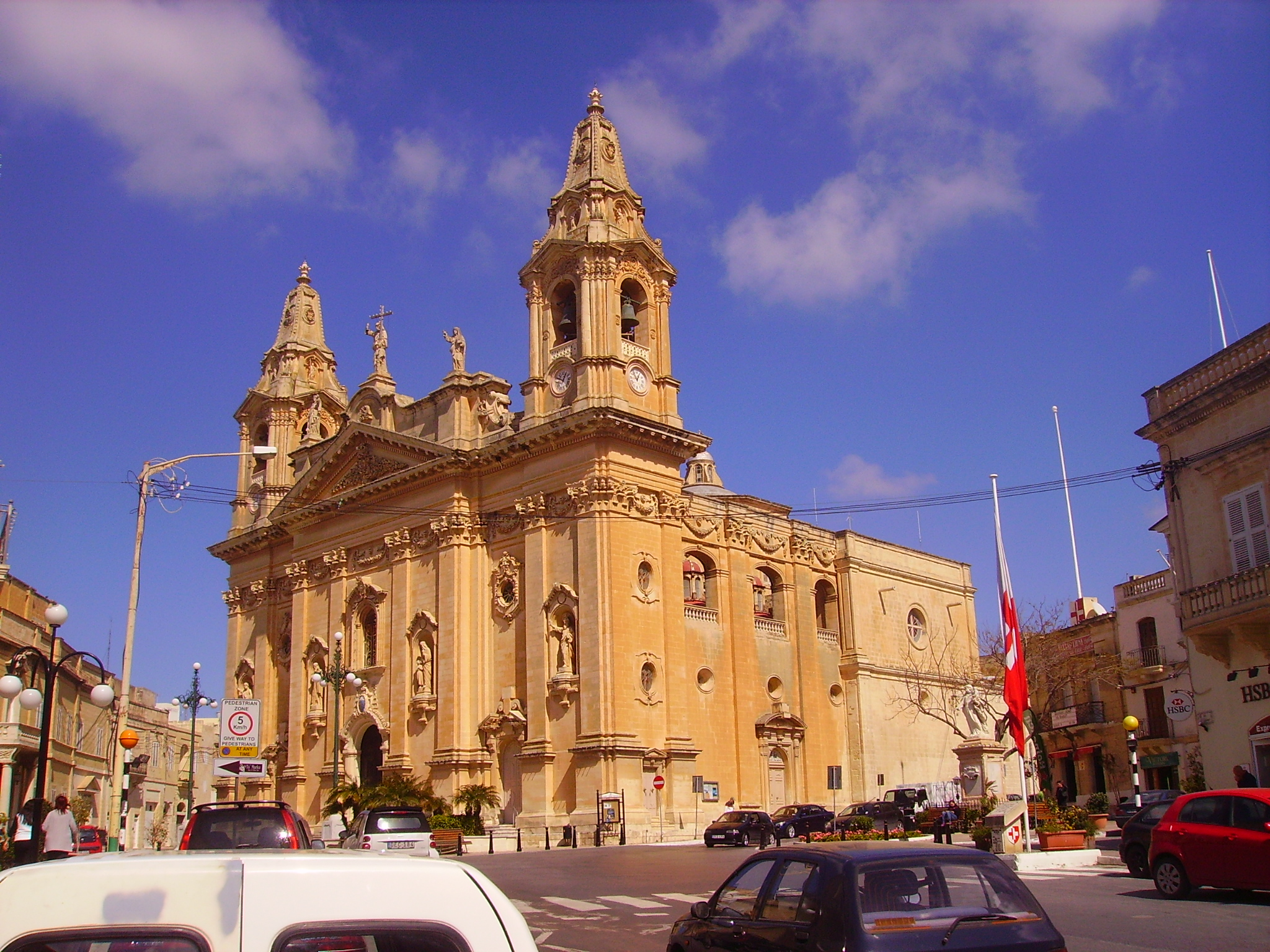
- Naxxar Parish Church

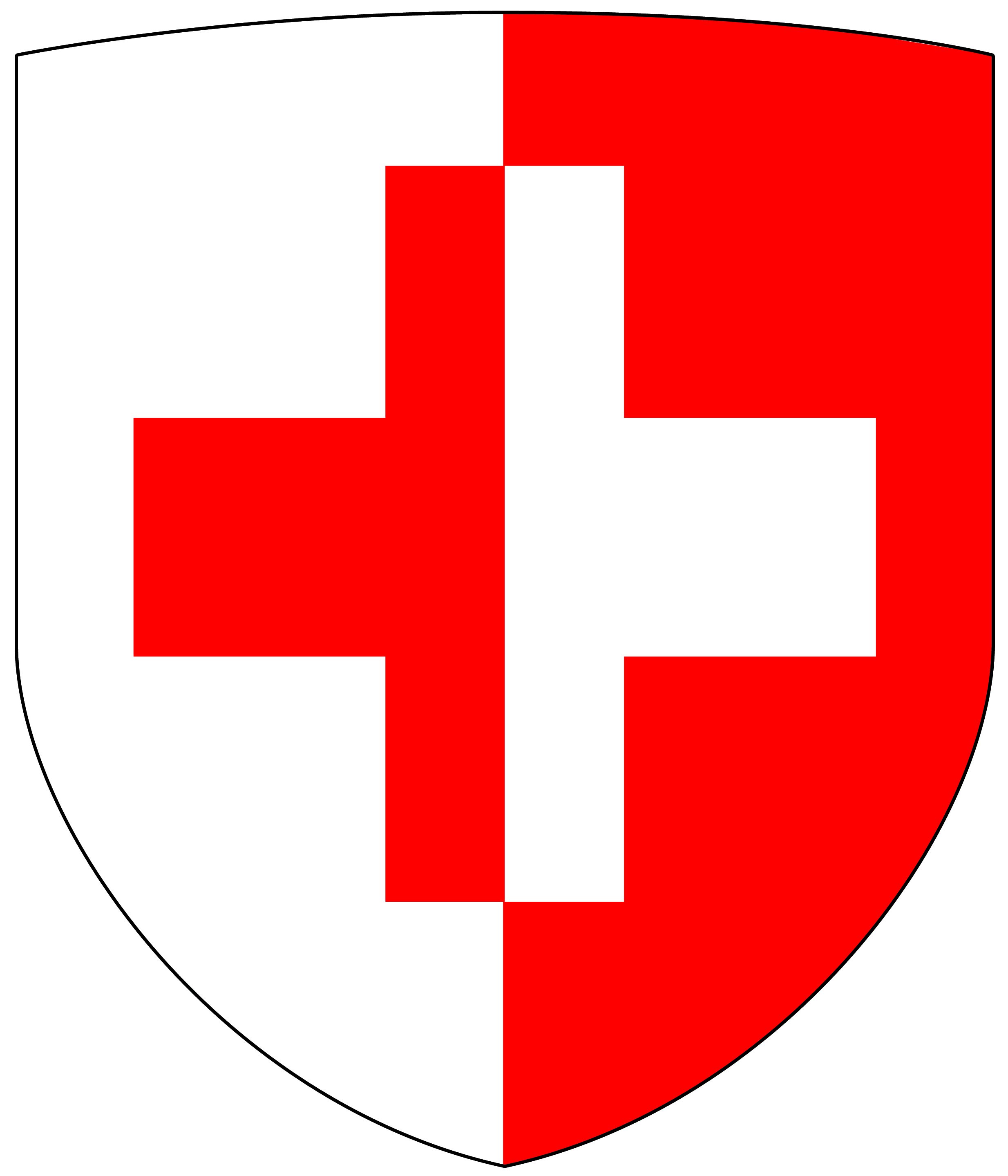
- Flag Coat of arms
- Motto: Prior Credidi (First to Believe)
- Coordinates: 35°54′54″N 14°26′41″E
- Country: Malta
- Region: Northern Region
- District: Northern District
- Borders: Għargħur, Iklin, Lija, Mosta, Pembroke, St. Paul's Bay, Swieqi

Government
  - Mayor: Christopher Deguara (PN)

Area
  - Total: 11.6 km^{2} (4.5 sq mi)

Population (Jul. 2024)
  - Total: 18,063
  - Density: 1,560/km^{2} (4,030/sq mi)
- Demonym(s): Naxxari (m), Naxxarija (f), Naxxarin (pl)
- Time zone: UTC+1 (CET)
  - Summer (DST): UTC+2 (CEST)
- Postal code: NXR
- Dialing code: 356
- ISO 3166 code: MT-38
- Patron saint: Our Lady of Victories
- Feast Day: 8 September
- Website: Official website

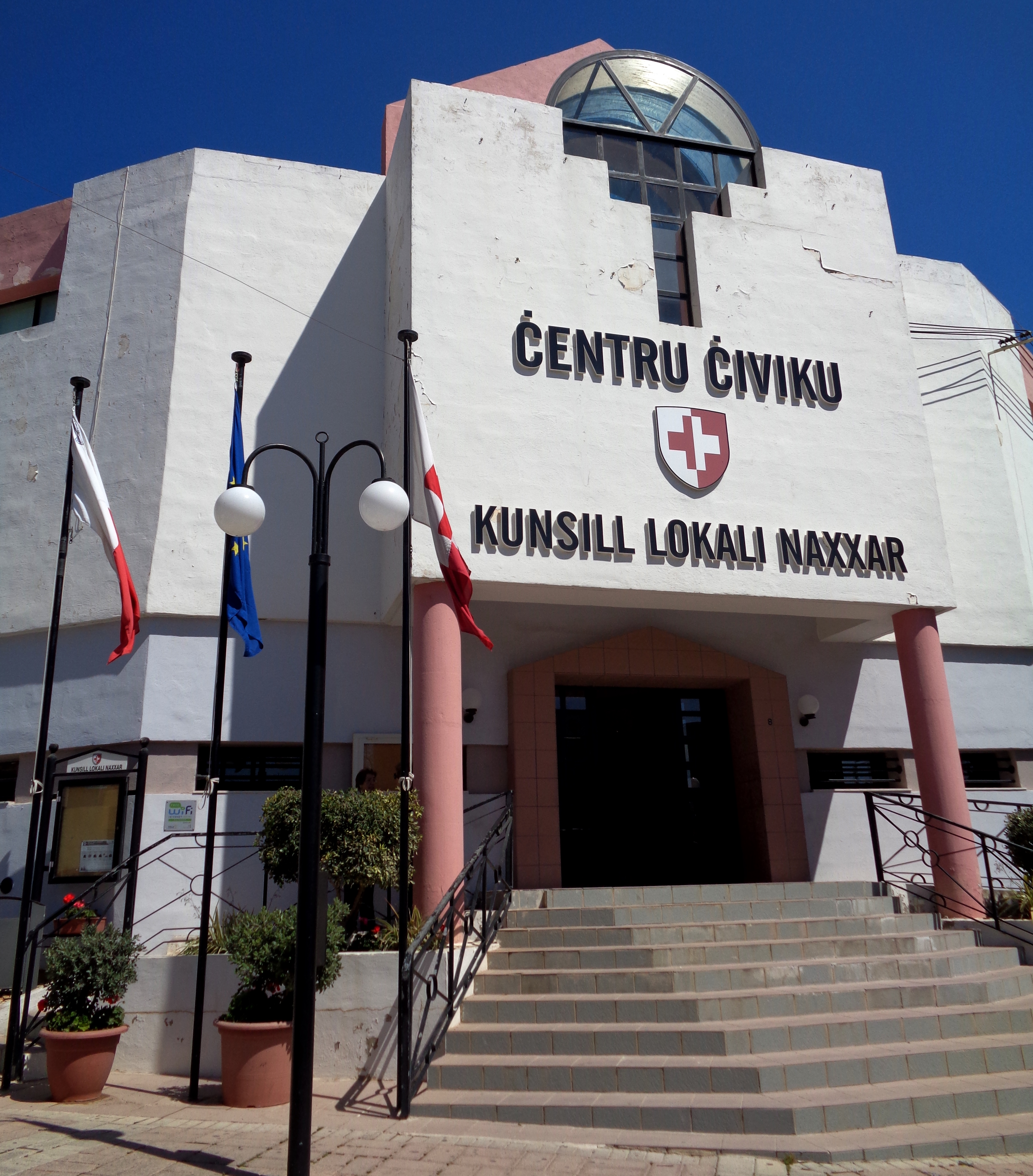
Naxxar Local Council, Civic Centre

Naxxar (Maltese: In-Naxxar) is a city and local council in the Northern Region of Malta. The population of Naxxar was 18,063 in July 2024. This included 9,115 males and 8,948 females; 14,534 Maltese nationals and 3,529 foreign nationals. The Naxxar Church is dedicated to Our Lady of Victories. The annual village feast is celebrated on 8 September. It formerly hosted the Maltese International Trade Fair at Maltese International Trade Fair Grounds.

Naxxar is spread over 11 square kilometres (4 sq mi).

== Zones in Naxxar ==
The whole locality comprises the following zones:

- Naxxar Centre
- Sgħajtar Area
- Santa Marija tax-Xagħra
- San Pawl tat-Tarġa
- Birguma
- Magħtab
- Is-Salina
- Baħar iċ-Ċagħaq
- Madliena (partly)

== Etymology ==
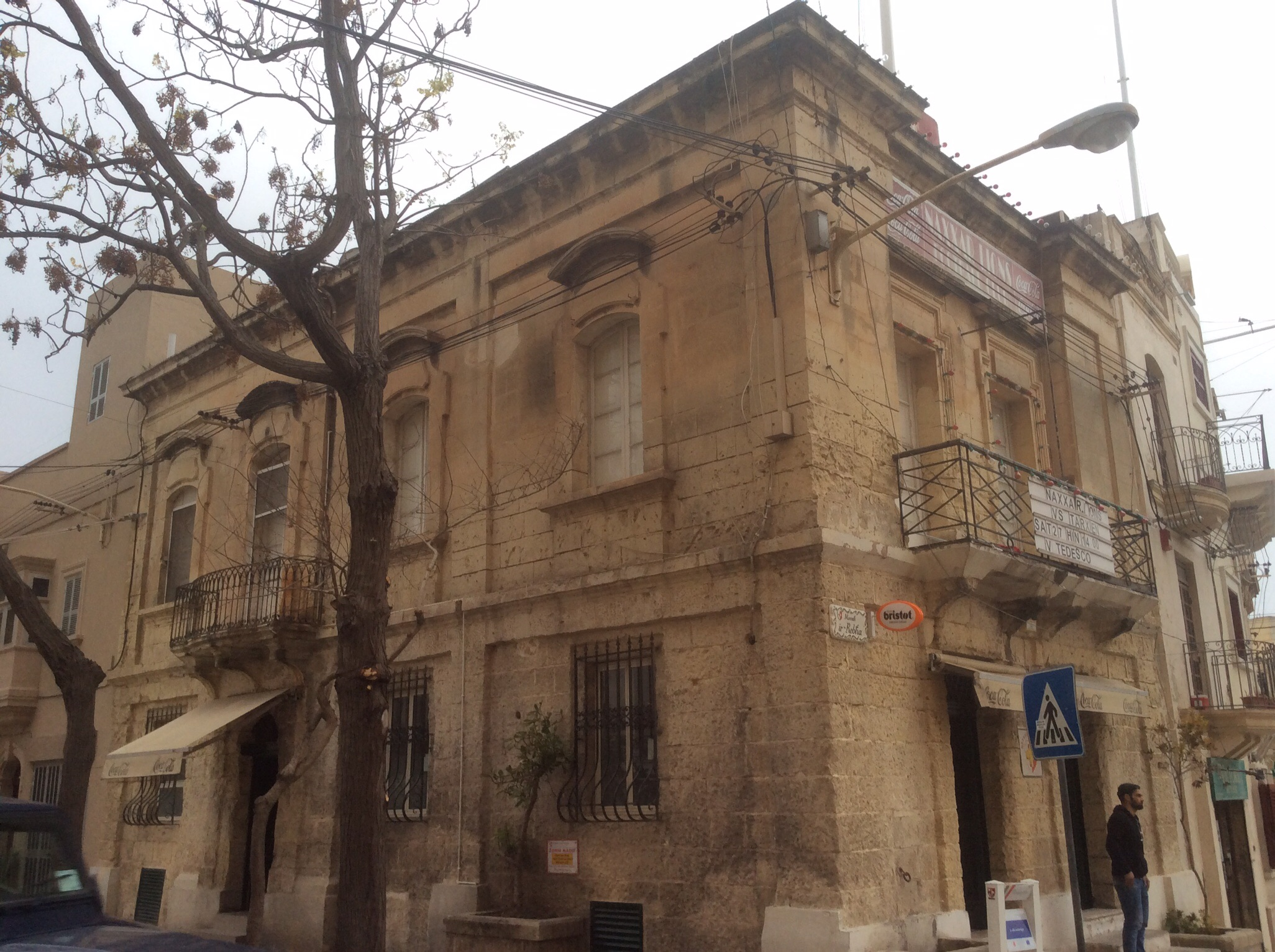
Armoury (il-Palazz tal-Armerija) building in Naxxar, now a football club, home of Naxxar Lions F.C.

According to legend and the Bible, the Naxxarin were amongst the first to help Saint Paul and his fellow shipwrecked passengers when their ship ran aground. For this reason many connect the name Naxxar with Nassar (Nasra) which means 'conversion to Christianity'.

The name is usually thought to be derived from the archaic Maltese verb "Naxxar", which means to spread out, with reference to the wide plateau the village is found on. Others insist that the name comes from "Nsara" or "Nazaroei" which means 'those who believe in the teachings of Christ who came from Nazareth and thus "Nozri"'. Others say that the word Naxxar means 'one who saws, separates or cuts' – in Naxxar, there are a lot of stonemasons.

Magri, in his book says that the word naxar comes from "nazar" which in Hebrew means "chosen for him" or else "one who keeps to himself". This is because in the vicinity the Arabs had formed a village that they called Hal Muselmiet, which means 'the village of the Muslims'. For this reason the Christians started another village – that of the Christians and so the name of Naxxar.

Although it has never been clearly explained where the name Naxxar originated, it is a clear fact that there is a close tie with the tradition that the people of Naxxar were the first converts to Christianity. In fact, the parish of Naxxar was the first in the Maltese outskirts, after that of the cathedral (Mdina) and that of Vittoriosa. This is borne out and further evidenced by the village motto – Prior Credidi – meaning the First To Believe.

== History ==
It is not clear when Naxxar became a village, but human habitation in the area dates to the prehistoric era. This is evidenced by megalithic remains at Tal-Qadi and at Qaliet Marku. The cart ruts which start at Salina up to it-Targa and near Ghadira tal-Wej were probably first cut in the same period.

- Boissevain, Jeremy (May 2014). Inversione residenziale: mutamenti nell’uso dello spazio sociale a Malta. Dialoghi Mediterranei. Istituto Euro-Arabico. (Italian)
- In 1565 the Naxxar area was also the scene of a running battle between retreating Turkish forces falling back on their fleet moored in St Paul's Bay and Christian forces from Mdina and the Viceroy of Sicily; effectively the last stages of the Great Siege of Malta where the Knights Hospitaller managed to resist the forces of Suleiman the Magnificent.

== Education ==
The Giovanni Curmi Higher Secondary School, a post-secondary state school, is located in Naxxar. GCHSS is offering academic courses at advanced, intermediate and ordinary levels. Located right next to the post-secondary school is Naxxar Middle School, a secondary school.

== The Parish Church ==
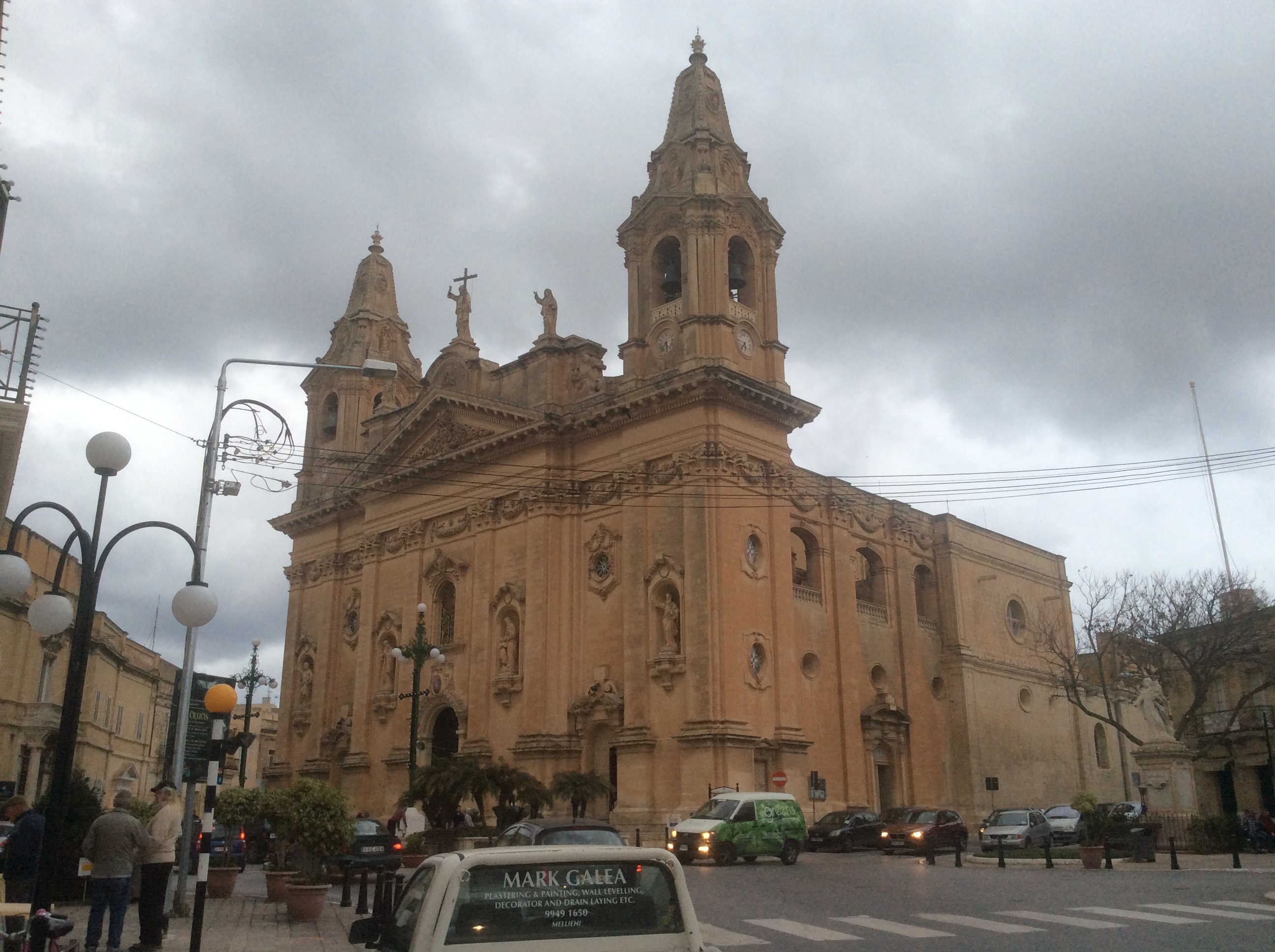
The parish church

The Naxxar parish church was one of the ten parishes found to be existing by Bishop De Mello in 1436 and the villages of Mosta and Għargħur were subject to it. De Mello listed it as one of the ten parishes of Malta and it was the first parish dedicated to Our Lady after that of the old cathedral in Mdina. In 1575, the parish of Naxxar had under its control a total of 36 churches – 14 in Naxxar, 5 in Għargħur, 12 in Mosta and 5 in the neighbourhood of these villages. The present church was built between 1616 and 1630 when there were 1,200 inhabitants in Naxxar and it was felt that a larger church was needed. The design was made by Tumas Dingli, one of the best architects of the time. The parish priest was Father Gakbu Pace. The choir and the area around it was redesigned in 1691 to the design of Lorenzo Gafà, the same architect who had designed the Mdina cathedral. The parish church was solemnly consecrated by Bishop Alpheran de Bussan on 11 December 1732.

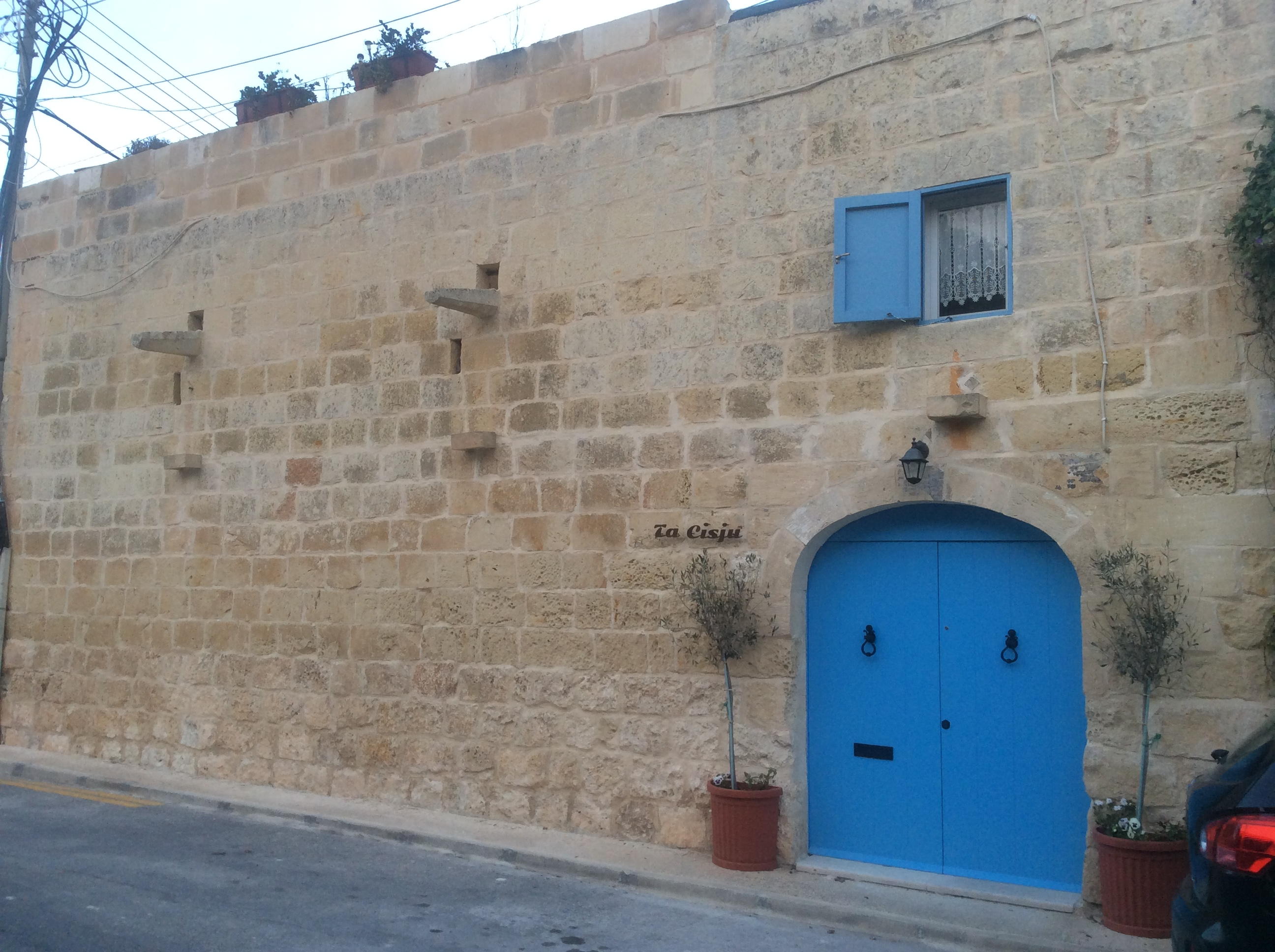
Ta' Cisju Farmhouse was built in 1730 and is the oldest rural building in Naxxar.

The church has three choirs: the renowned Jubilate Deo choir under the direction of Christopher Muscat, its sister children's choir Pueri Cantores Jubilate Deo handled by Daniela Callus and Kor Gaudete In Domino directed by Mario Attard. The church also has two transepts and a nave and is 130 feet (40 m) long. The width of the transept is 94 feet (29 m) and the nave 30 feet (9.1 m). The large bell was made by the founder Toni Tanti in 1840 and cost. The façade of the church has two clocks, one showing the actual time whilst the other is a painting and shows the time as a quarter to eleven.

The main painting shows the Birth of Our Lady which is attributed to the school of Mattia Preti whilst at the side there are two paintings by Stefano Erardi which show the Flight to Egypt and the Adoration of the Magi. Other paintings which show the Madonna and Child, St. Cajetan, St. Aloysius Gonzaga, Our Saviour and Our Lady of Sorrows are the works of the Maltese painter Franġisku Zahra. In the sacristy hangs the antique painting showing Our Lady of the Rosary which was painted on wood by Gio Maria Abela in 1595.

The main door, which is made of bronze, is dated to 1913 and is the work of Pio Cellini. The door is made up of four main panels depicting the coat of arms of Our Lady, Patroness of Naxxar; the village coat of arms; the coat of arms of Pope Pius X and the coat of arms of the Zammit family who were the benefactors of this door. In 1952, this door was dismantled, renovated and cleaned by the blacksmith Mastru Lucens Agius. The expenses involved were once more paid for by the Zammit family.

The statue of the Vitorja, whose feast is celebrated on 8 September, was imported from Rome whilst the statues of the Good Friday Procession are the work of a Maltese craftsman. Naxxar was one of the first villages which had the statues of the Passion of Our Lord and in fact it is believed that the procession started being held just after 1750. On 9 November 1787, the body of the martyr St. Vittorio was brought from the cemetery of St. Calepodio of Rome and is found in the altar in the choir. Some of the sculptures and façades were made by Angelo Quatromanni.

== Chapels ==
In the larger Naxxar area, there are various chapels. These include the chapel of the Immaculate Conception which was built in the 18th century; St Lucy's chapel; the chapel of the Shipwreck of St. Paul situated at San Pawl tat-Tarġa; Church of the Nativity of St. John the Baptist; the chapel of St. James the Apostle; Santa Maria tax-Xagħra; the Assumption of the Virgin in Magħtab which was built in the 18th century; the Annunciation of the Virgin at Salina which was built in the 16th century; the church of St. Michael the Archangel in Salina; that of St. John the Evangelist and that of St. Mary of the Angels in Baħar iċ-Ċagħaq.

== Fortifications ==
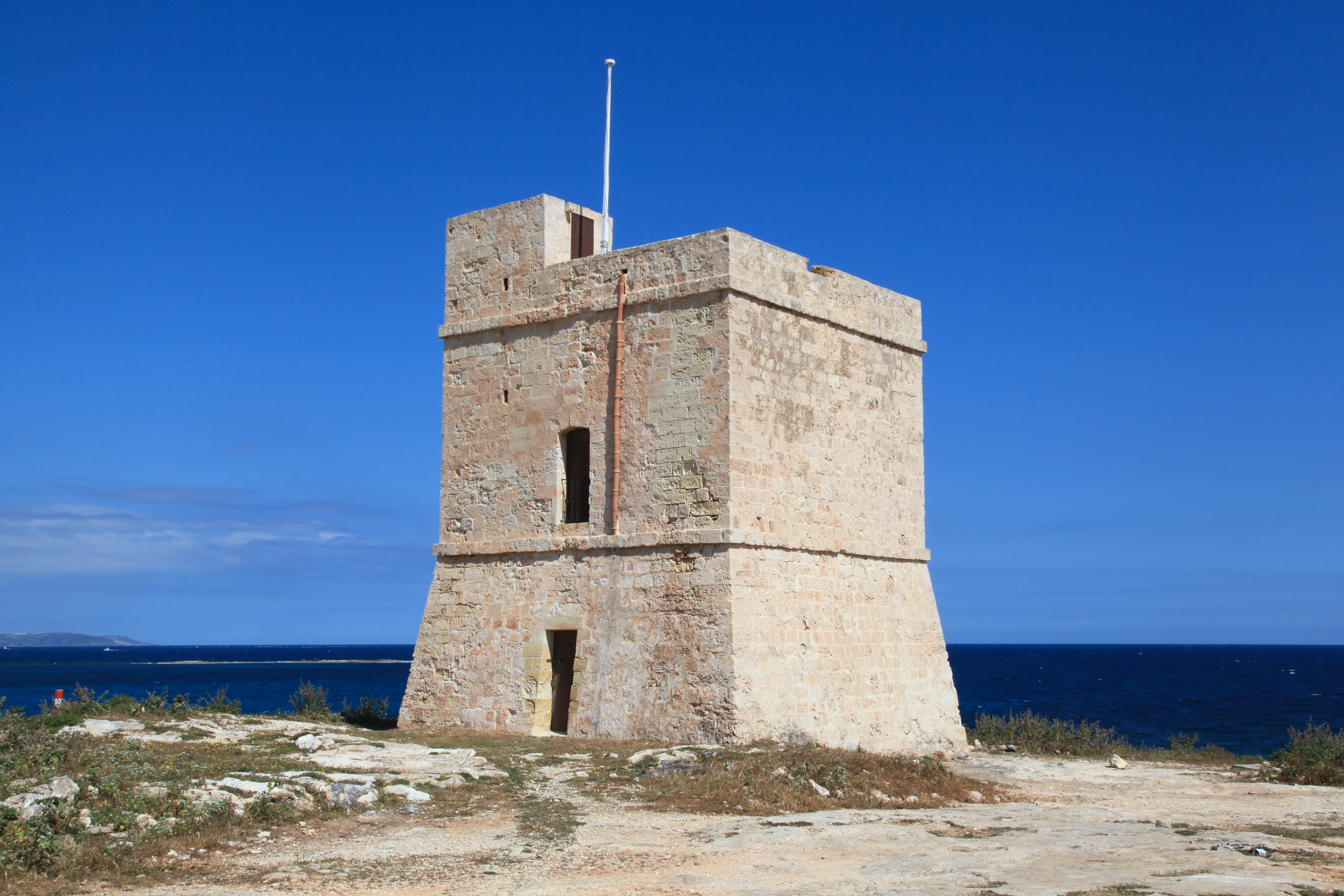
Saint Mark's Tower

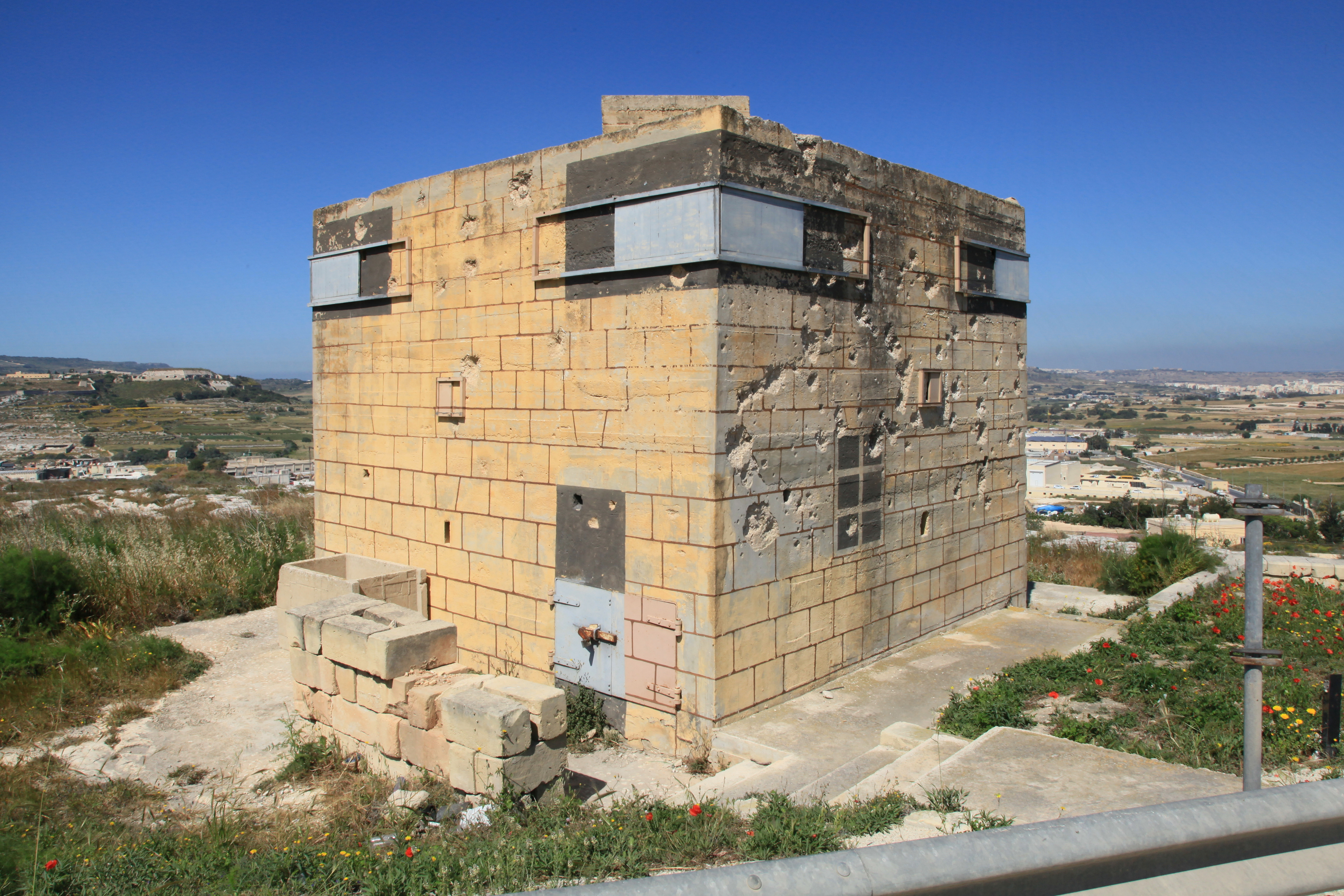
Reserve Post R15

The actual area where Naxxar is built offers a natural shelter to its inhabitants. In fact, in early times the village was used to reconnoitre the movements of the enemy. Because this height has a plain which goes right down to the sea, we find that three forms of defence were built through the ages – those along the sea such as towers, entrenchments, batteries, redoubts and beachposts – as a physical resistance to those attempting to land from the sea; inland defences like pillboxes – to hinder the advance of the enemy if they were successful in landing; and the fortifications on high ground.

Some fortifications around Naxxar include:

- Gauci Tower, a 16th-century tower
- Captain's Tower, a 16th-century tower
- Għallis Tower, a 17th-century coastal tower
- Saint Mark's Tower, a 17th-century coastal tower
- Baħar iċ-Ċagħaq Redoubt, an 18th-century coastal redoubt
- Ximenes Redoubt, an 18th-century coastal redoubt
- Naxxar Entrenchment, an 18th-century inland entrenchment
- Victoria Lines, a 19th-century defensive line
- Reserve Post R15, a 20th-century pillbox

== Notable residences ==
=== Palazzo Parisio ===
Palazzo Parisio in Naxxar was built by Grandmaster Manoel de Vilhena in the 18th century. The palace was used by the Jesuit community as a university. After buying the property in 1898, Marquis Scicluna altered it into its present state and purchased more land at the back, converting it into a garden, between 1898 and 1906.

=== Palazzo Nasciaro ===
Palazzo Nasciaro is an 18th-century palace built during the Order of St. John that saw different adaptive reuse throughout the years. It is a prime example of late baroque architecture in Naxxar. Throughout its history, it was the residence of architect Francesco Sammut and later of his son Giovanni Sammut, it was the Lieutenant's house in the north of Malta, later served as the first public school in Naxxar, it was the police headquarters and until recently a police station, it served as a maternity underground hospital during World War II and provided shelter for the community from the war bombardments. Today, it is a private residence.

=== Hompesch Hunting Lodge ===
Hompesch Hunting Lodge was a hunting lodge built by Grandmaster Hompesch close to Gauci Tower and Captain's Tower. Today it is in a dilapidated state.

=== Villa Castro ===
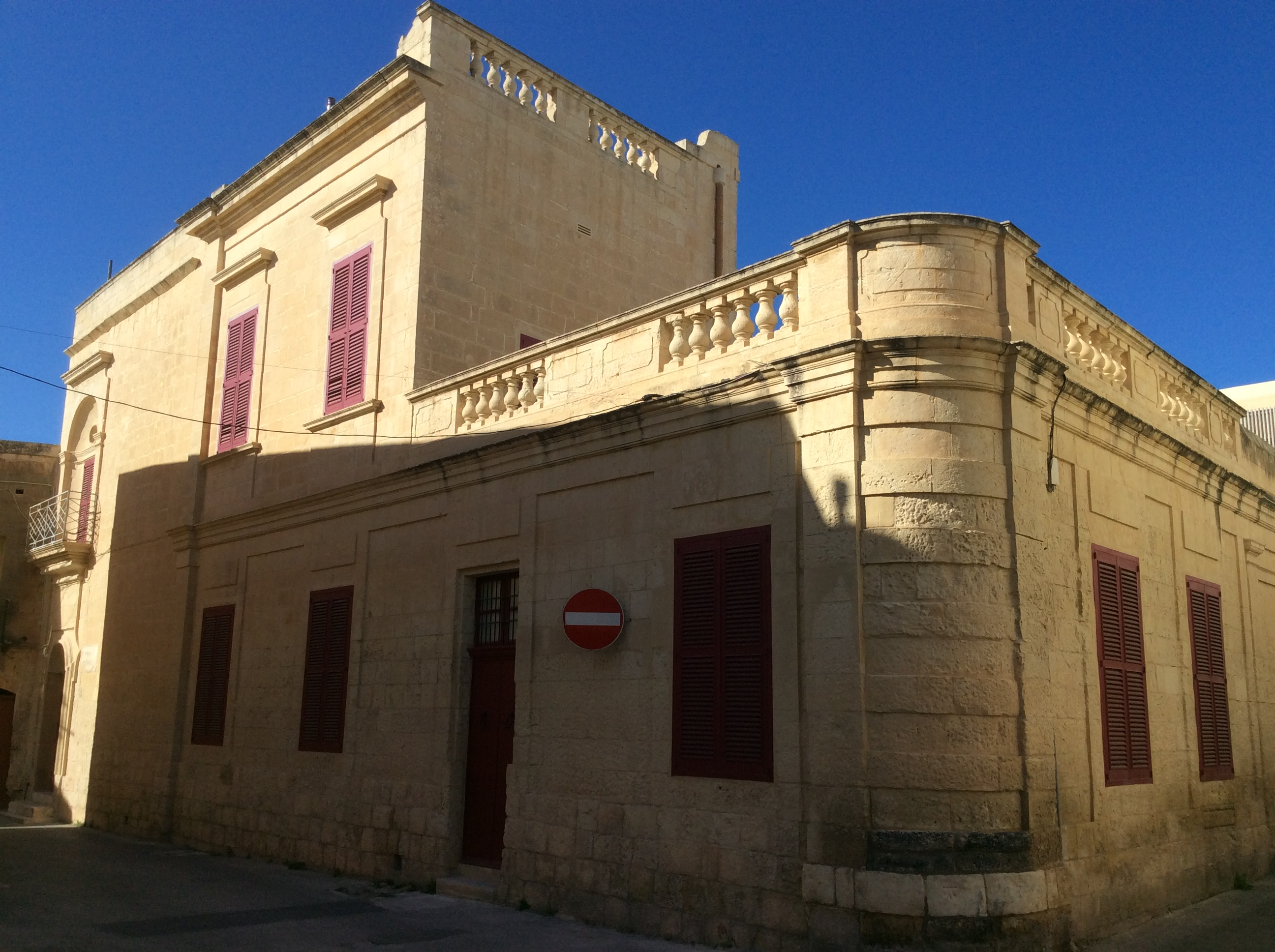
An exterior view of Palazzo Castro

Villa Castro, formerly Palazzo Castro, is a Knights-period country residence which has been renovated and developed for modern housing in the 21st century. The outer gardens were demolished and developed into other surrounding buildings along the years.

== Economy ==
The head office of Quality Schools International, an international school organization, is in Naxxar.

== Notable people ==
- Mary Spiteri, former Eurovision Song Contest participant, finished in third place in ESC 1992
- Claudette Pace, former Eurovision Song Contest participant and politician
- Saviour Pirotta, children's author, now a British citizen living in the UK
- Toni Bajada, legendary Maltese hero from the 16th century

== Twin towns – sister cities ==
Naxxar is twinned with:

- Baveno, Italy
- Cicciano, Italy
- Aigrefeuille, France
