= Fortifications of Malta =

Defensive military constructions of the Maltese archipelago

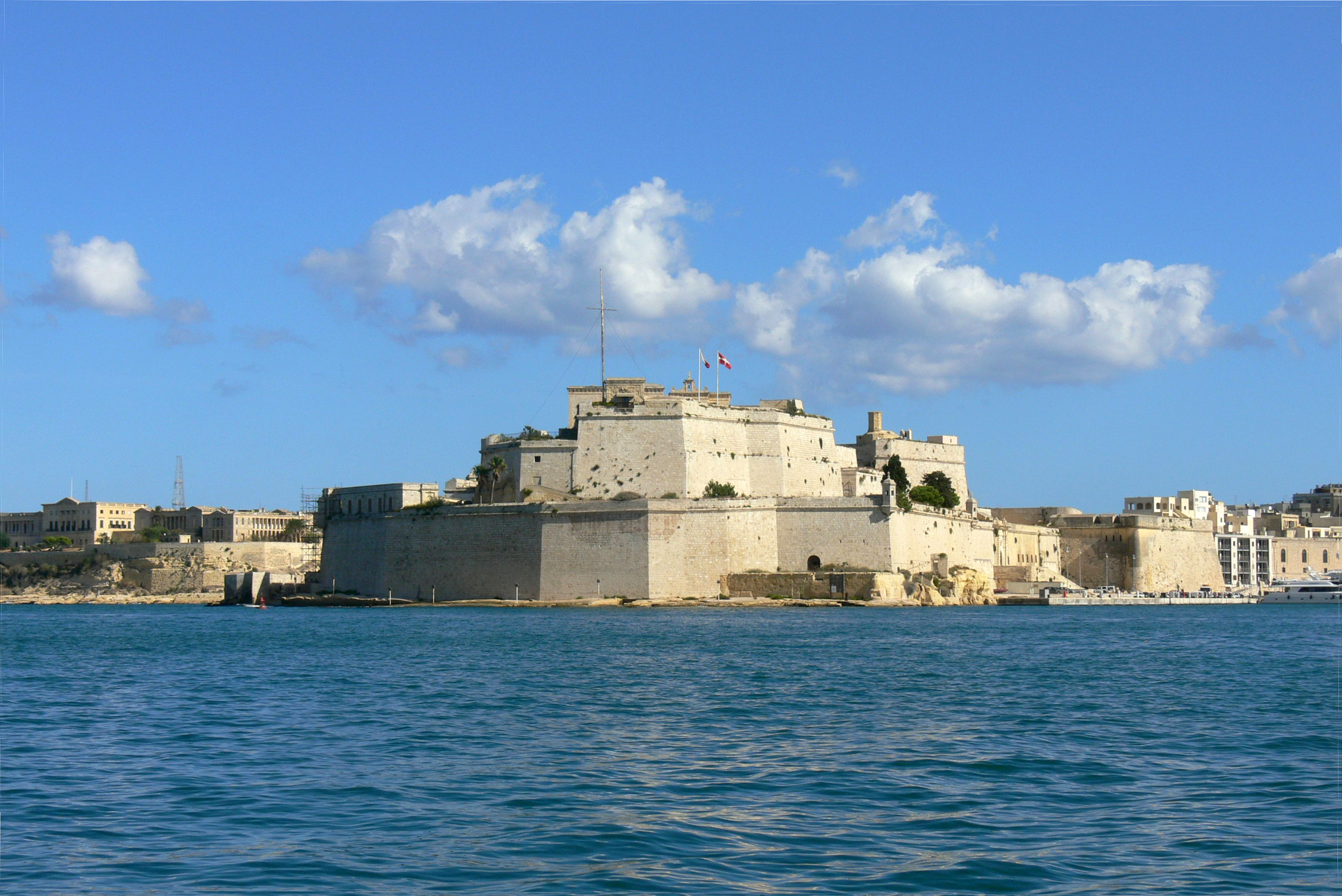
Fort Saint Angelo in Birgu

The fortifications of Malta consist of a number of walled cities, citadels, forts, towers, batteries, redoubts, entrenchments and pillboxes. The fortifications were built over hundreds of years, from around 1450 BC to the mid-20th century, and they are a result of the Maltese islands' strategic position and natural harbours, which have made them very desirable for various powers.

The earliest known fortifications in Malta are defensive walls built around Bronze Age settlements. The Phoenicians, Romans and Byzantines built a number of defensive walls around important settlements, but very little remains of these survive today. By the late medieval period, the main fortifications on Malta were the capital Mdina, the Cittadella on Gozo, the Castrum Maris and a few coastal towers or lookout posts.

The fortifications of Malta were greatly improved while the islands were ruled by the Order of St. John between 1530 and 1798. The Hospitallers built new bastioned fortifications, such as the fortifications of Birgu and Valletta, and upgraded the medieval defences. By the end of the 18th century, Malta had extensive fortifications around the Grand Harbour and Marsamxett, as well as a coastal defence system consisting of towers, batteries, redoubts and entrenchments.

Following a brief French occupation, the islands fell under British rule in 1800. Between the 1870s and the 1900s a number of polygonal forts and batteries were built around Malta's coastline and along the Great Fault. In the 1930s and 1940s, Fort Campbell, a series of pillboxes and a number of anti-aircraft batteries were constructed, and these were the last fortifications to be built in Malta.

Malta's fortifications are considered to be among the best examples of military architecture anywhere in the world. Major General Whitworth Porter of the Royal Engineers, called Malta "the most powerful artificial fortress in the world" in his 1858 book A History of the Fortress of Malta. In his 1893 book The Story of Malta, Maturin Murray Ballou wrote that "there is not a more complete system of fortifications extant, in any part of the world, than the cordon of defensive structures at Malta."

The British architect Quentin Hughes referred to Malta's fortifications as "for sheer concentration and majesty quite unmatched", while judge and historian Giovanni Bonello said that "nowhere in the world are fortifications more extensive, more impressive, more outstanding than they are in Malta."

== Ancient and Medieval fortifications (pre-1530) ==
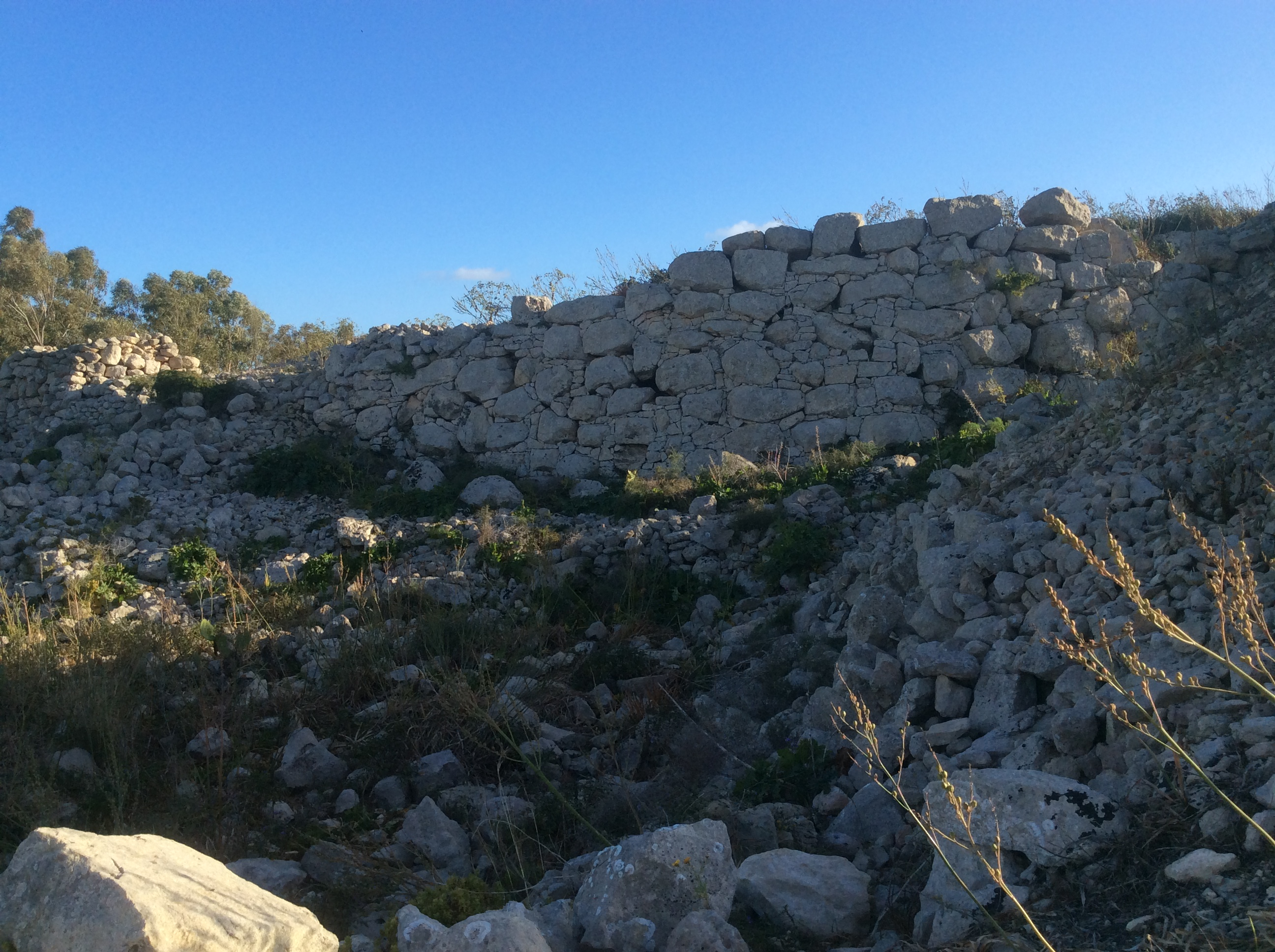
Bronze Age defensive wall at Borġ in-Nadur

The first fortifications in Malta were built during the Bronze Age. At least six sites have been identified as possible fortified settlements. The best preserved of these is the village of Borġ in-Nadur, close to the modern town of Birżebbuġa. Around 1450 BC, the inhabitants of the village built a 4.5m high D-shaped bastion to bar access to their village. The wall was built facing inland, showing that the people living in the village were more afraid of attacks from the land than from the sea.

In around 700 BC, the Phoenicians founded and fortified the city of Maleth on one of the highest points of the island, far away from the sea. Eventually the city was taken over by the Roman Empire and it was renamed Melite. The city was again renamed Medina by the Arabs which led to its present name Mdina. Its fortifications were modified a number of times over time, and although most were dismantled and rebuilt between the 16th and 18th centuries, some foundations of the ancient Punic-Roman ramparts, as well as various medieval remains, were recently discovered during excavations.

The remains of several round towers have been found in Malta, and they are believed to date back to the late Punic or Roman periods. It is possible that these were used as watchtowers, but some historians dispute this since their locations do not really make sense in defensive systems.

According to Al-Himyarī, when the Arabs captured Malta in 870 AD, they besieged, captured, sacked and dismantled a fortress.

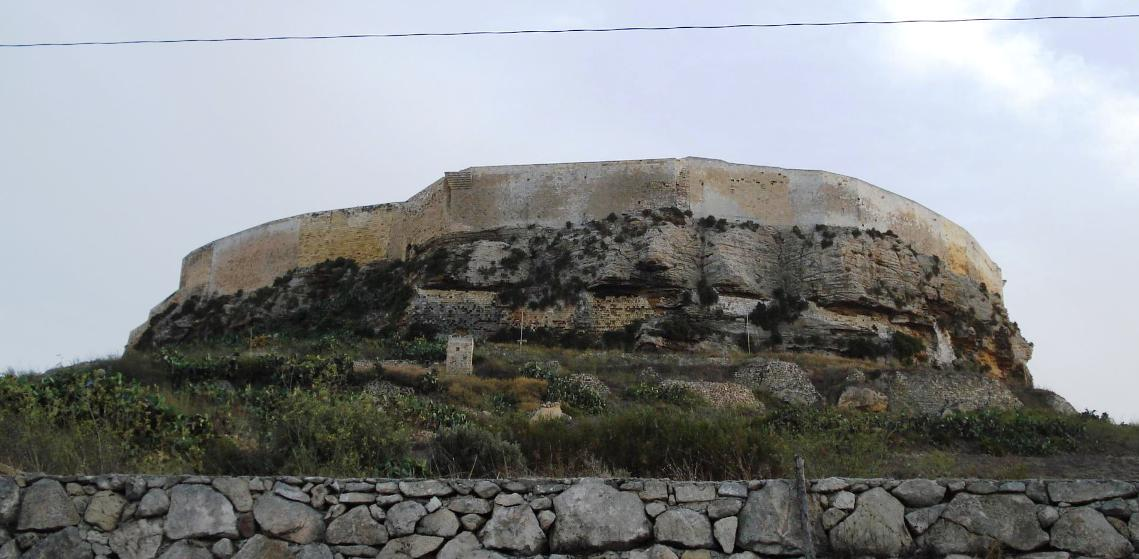
The northern walls of the Cittadella were built in the 15th century

By 1241, the Gran Castello or Cittadella on Gozo was definitely fortified, although a settlement on the hill had existed since the Bronze Age. The city's fortifications were improved over the years, and the northern walls of the city that still stand today were built around the 15th century by the Crown of Aragon.

The Castrum Maris was built sometime in the Middle Ages. The castle definitely existed by the 13th century, and it was involved in the Battle of Malta of 1283. By the early 16th century, it belonged to the de Nava family.

In 1417, the local militia had at least 24 watch posts around the Maltese islands, and in some cases there might have been fortified coastal watchtowers at these posts. One of these towers is known to have been built at St Elmo Point on the Sciberras Peninsula by the Aragonese in 1488.

== Hospitaller fortifications (1530–1798) ==
=== Harbour area ===
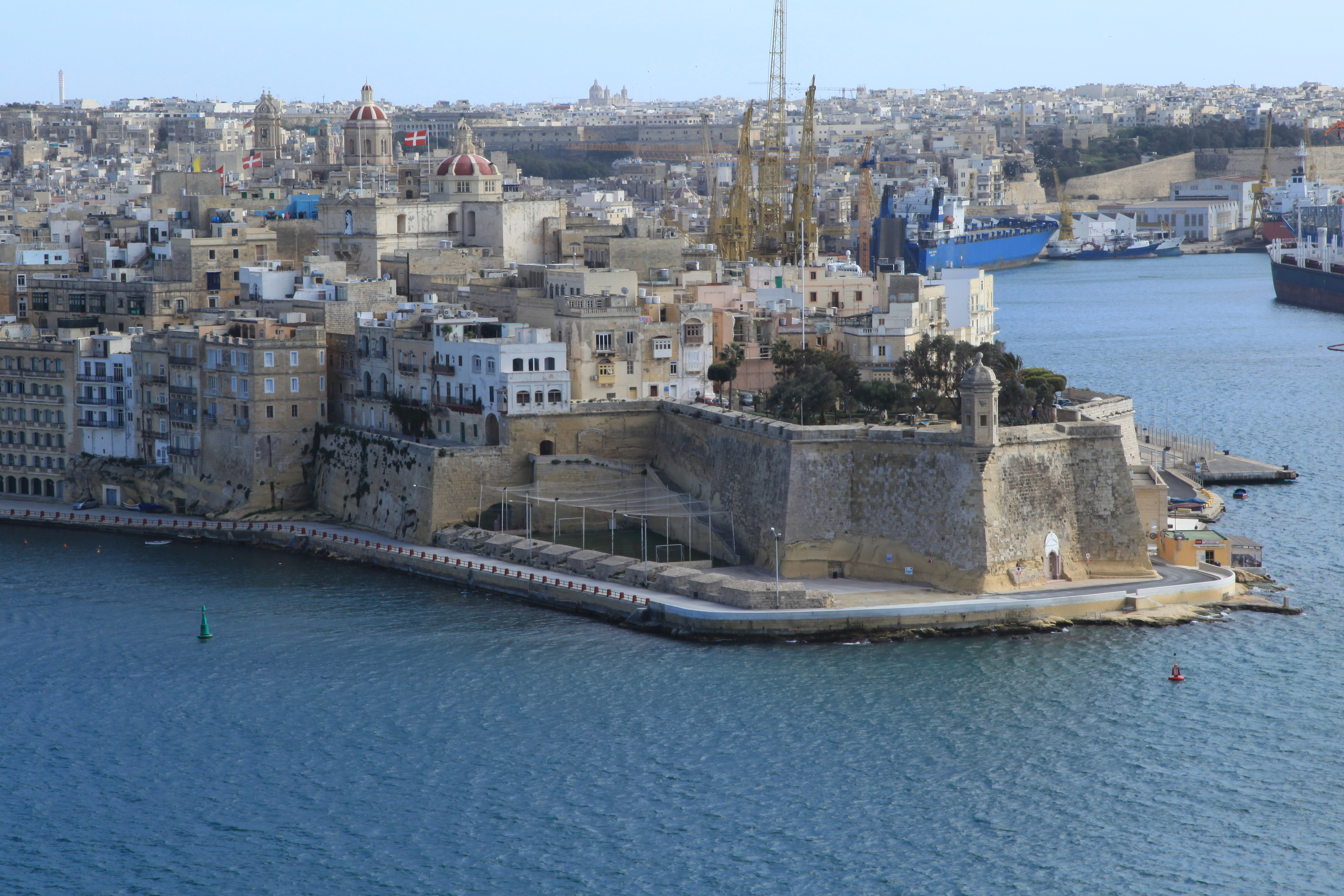
Seaward fortifications of Senglea

In 1530, the Maltese islands along with the North African port city of Tripoli were given to the Order of Saint John by Emperor Charles V. The knights settled in the town of Birgu and made it their capital. Soon after their arrival, the Order rebuilt the Castrum Maris, calling it Fort Saint Angelo. Later on, the entire town of Birgu began to be surrounded by new fortifications, in a similar style to the Order's earlier defences in Rhodes. Birgu's land front was built by 1540. Following the attack of 1551, the Order realised the need to build more defences. Two forts were built in 1552: Fort Saint Elmo at the tip of the Sciberras Peninsula, on the site of an Aragonese watchtower, and Fort Saint Michael in Senglea. In 1553, a new fortified city began to be built around Fort Saint Michael, and it was named Senglea after the Grand Master who built it.

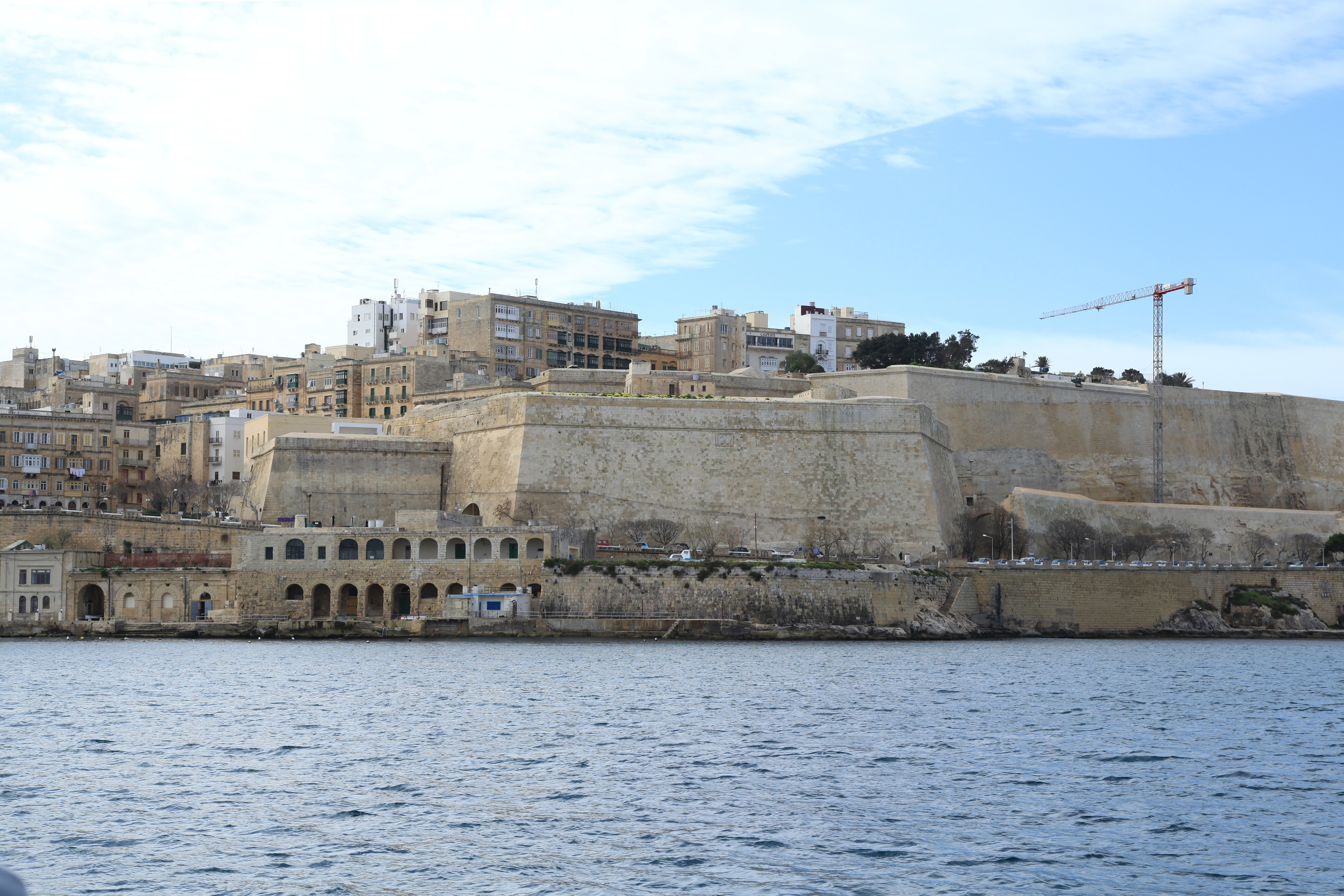
Saint Andrew's Bastion in Valletta

In 1565, the Ottomans attacked again in the Great Siege of Malta. Fort Saint Elmo fell after fierce fighting (in which the Ottoman general Dragut Reis was killed), but the knights held out in Birgu and Senglea until a relief force arrived. By the end of the siege, most of the fortifications had been destroyed in the attacks, so they were rebuilt. The Grand Master, Jean Parisot de Valette, decided to build a new fortified capital on the Sciberras Peninsula. The first stone of the new city was laid down in 1566, and it was called Valletta. The city walls, which were constructed mainly in the 1560s and 1570s, remain largely intact to this day, and they include bastions, cavaliers, counterguards and a ditch. The ruined Fort Saint Elmo was rebuilt and integrated into the city walls. The area around St Elmo was strengthened a number of times later on in the 17th century, especially by the building of the Carafa Enceinte in 1687.

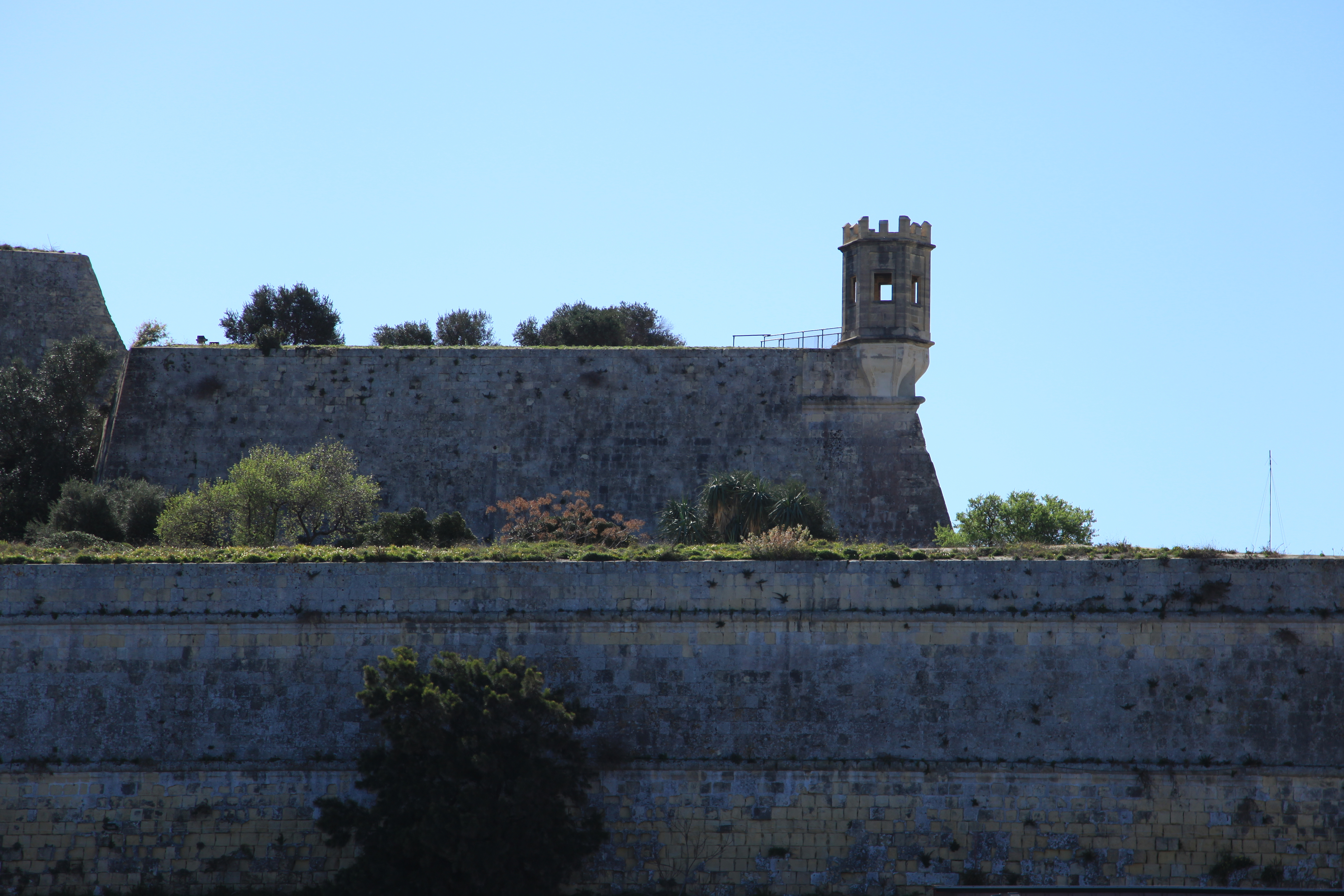
San Salvatore Bastion and Counterguard, part of the Floriana Lines

With the development of new technologies, by the 17th century it was realised that while Valletta's fortifications were well designed, they were not strong enough to withstand a heavy attack. Because of this, the Floriana Lines, encircling Valletta's original land front, were built from 1635 to the 1640s. In the 18th century, a suburb developed between the Floriana Lines and Valletta's land front, and it became known as Floriana, today a town in its own right.

In 1638, the Santa Margherita Lines began to be built encircling the land fronts of Birgu and Senglea. Works were suspended in 1645 due to a lack of funds, and they remained unfinished for many years. Following the fall of Candia to the Ottomans in 1669, a second line of fortifications, the Cottonera Lines, began to be built encircling both Birgu and Senglea, as well as the unfinished Santa Margherita Lines. They were begun in 1670, but works stopped in 1680 again due to a lack of funds. By this time, the bastioned enceinte had been built, although other crucial parts had not yet been constructed. Eventually, some effort was done to complete both the Santa Margherita and Cottonera Lines in the early 18th century, although some of the planned ravelins, cavaliers, ditch and other fortifications were never constructed. Fort San Salvatore was built on one of the Cottonera Lines bastions in 1724.

Fort Ricasoli was built between 1670 and 1698 commanding the eastern arm of the Grand Harbour. It has an irregular plan following the coastline, with bastions, curtains and ravelins. The fort was improved later on in the 18th century. Fort Saint Angelo was also extensively modified in the 1690s, when it was upgraded with the building of various batteries and other defences.

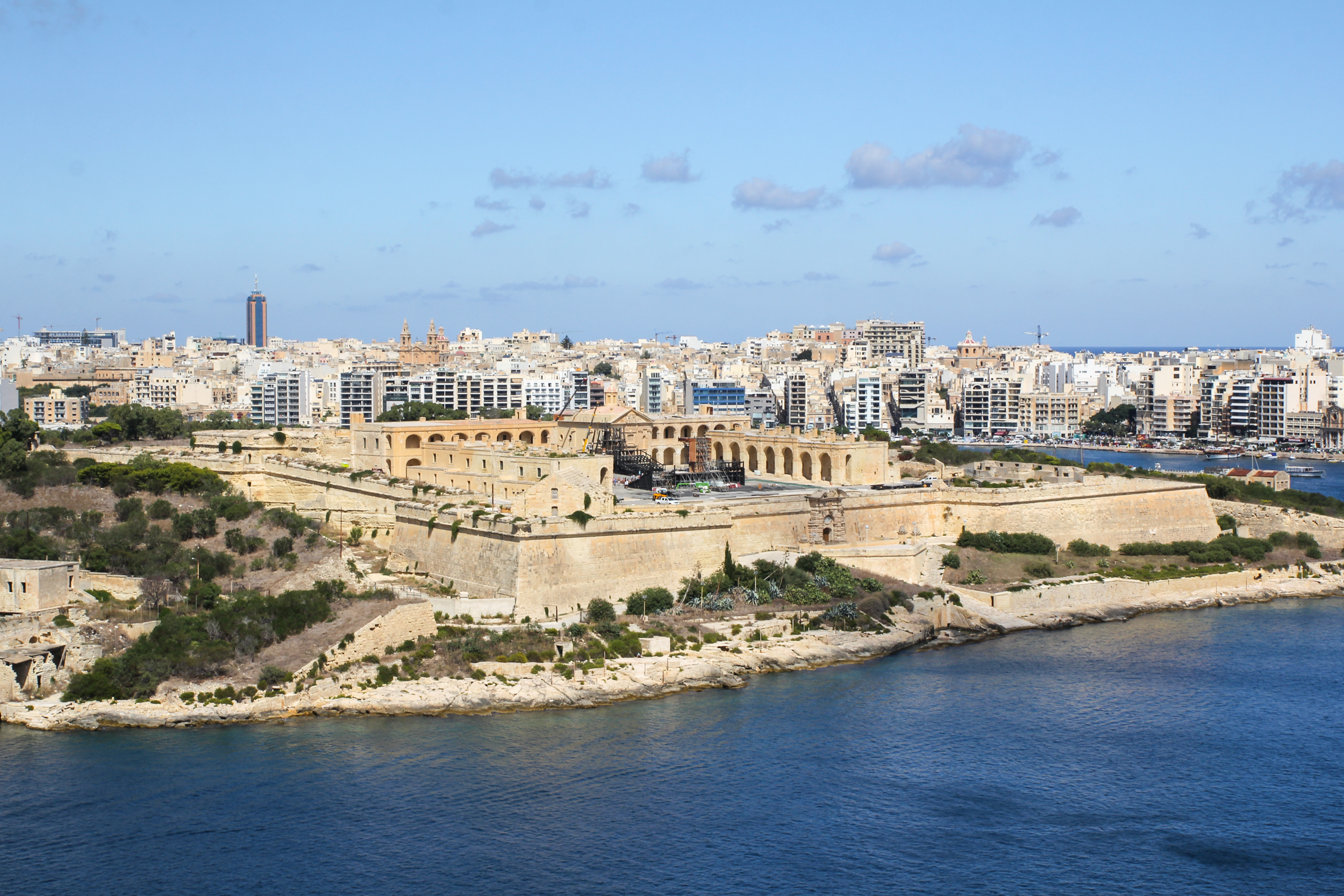
Fort Manoel as seen from the bastions of Valletta

From 1723 to 1733, Fort Manoel was built on Manoel Island in Marsamxett Harbour, so as to protect Valletta's western flank. The Baroque fort is square in shape, with four corner bastions. It was the last major fort to be built with the bastioned trace in Malta. The Order's last major fortification in the harbour area was Fort Tigné, built at Tigné Point between 1793 and 1795. It was built to protect the entrance of Marsamxett, along with Fort Saint Elmo. The fort's architecture is very different from the Order's earlier forts, and although very small by 18th century standards, it has been described as among the most revolutionary and influential of Malta's fortifications as it is a very early example of a polygonal fort. Many other polygonal forts were built by the British later on in the 19th century.

=== Mdina and the Cittadella ===
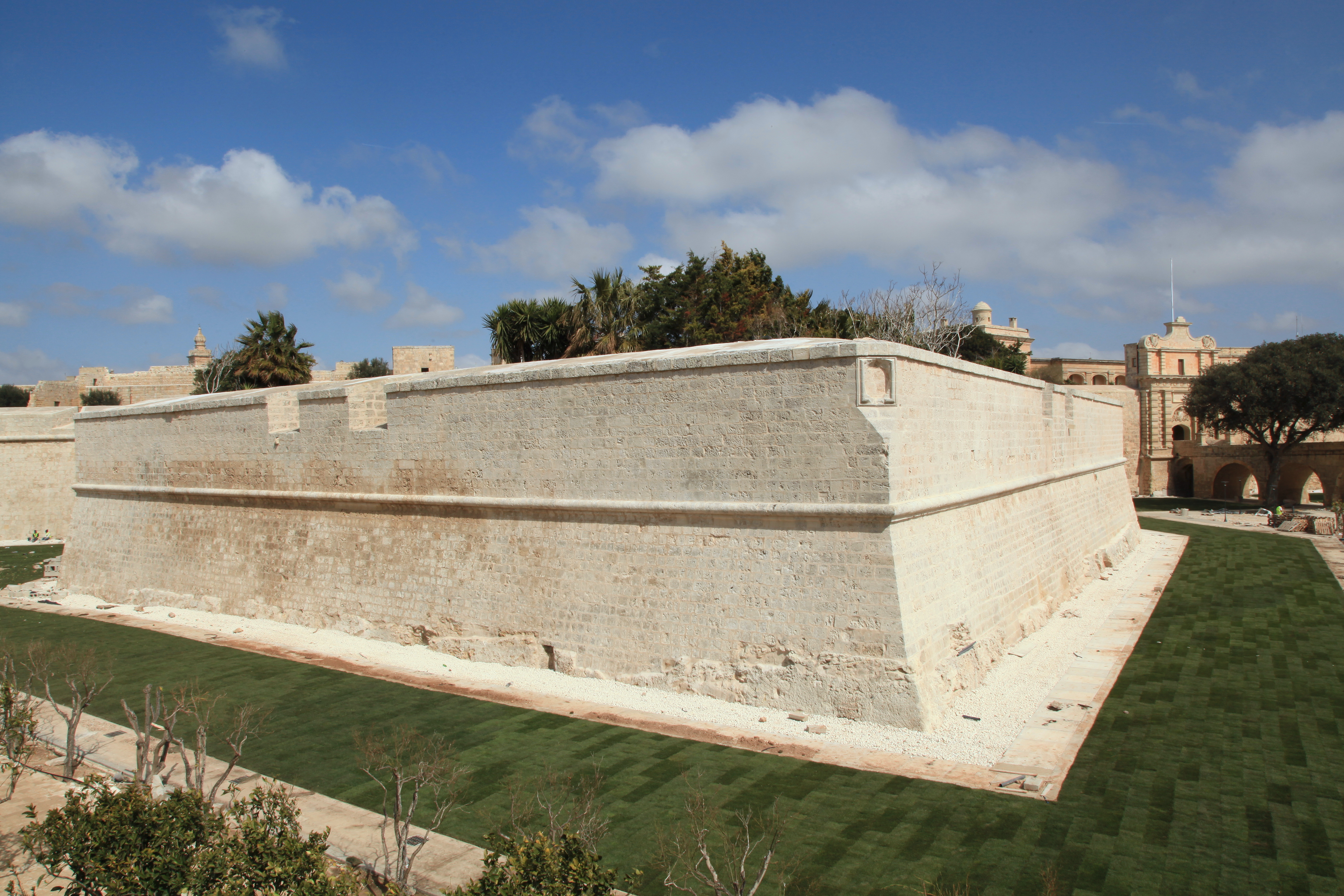
De Redin Bastion in Mdina

Although Mdina was no longer the capital city, the Order still strengthened the city's defences, and gradually upgraded its medieval walls into a gunpowder fortress. In the 1540s, during the magistracy of Juan de Homedes y Coscon, two bastions were built on the corners of the city's land front. The central De Redin Bastion was built by Grand Master Martin de Redin in the mid-17th century. The city was damaged during the 1693 Sicily earthquake, and repairs were made over the course of the 18th century. During the rebuilding, the city's entrance was replaced by a larger gate by the architect Charles François de Mondion in 1724, and the last modifications were made in 1746, when Despuig Bastion was completed. There were other plans to strengthen the city but these were not implemented as the Order focused on the fortifications at the harbour area.

The defences of Gozo's Cittadella were also improved by the Order. In 1551, the city was devastated by an Ottoman raid which took almost Gozo's entire population as slaves. The city's entrance and southern walls were later completely rebuilt between 1599 and 1622, although the city's northern walls were retained in their original medieval form. The early 17th century modifications included the construction of bastions, cavaliers, magazines and a battery.

=== Coastal fortifications ===
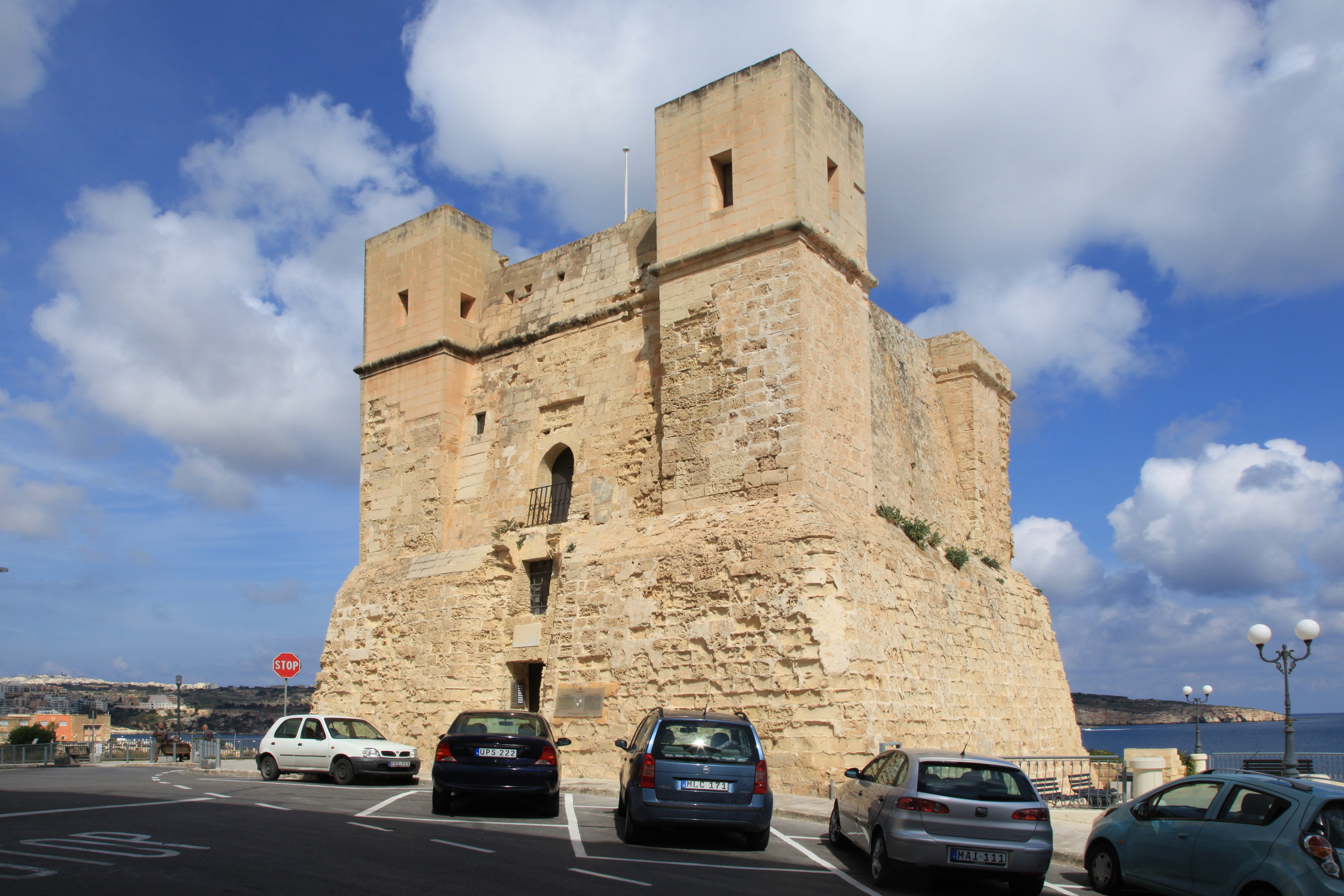
Wignacourt Tower in St. Paul's Bay

Despite the significant fortifications in the harbour area, the rest of the islands remained mostly undefended until the 17th century, and they were prone to attacks (such as the raid of 1551). This changed in 1605, when Garzes Tower was built in Mġarr on the island of Gozo. This watchtower no longer exists as it was demolished by the British administration in 1848.

In the following years, more towers were built around the islands. The first group, the Wignacourt towers, were built between 1610 and 1620. Six of these were built, and they were more than just watchtowers as they formed significant strongpoints intended to protect vulnerable sections of the coast from attack. Of the six towers, one collapsed in around 1715 and another was demolished in 1888. The other four towers survive to this day.

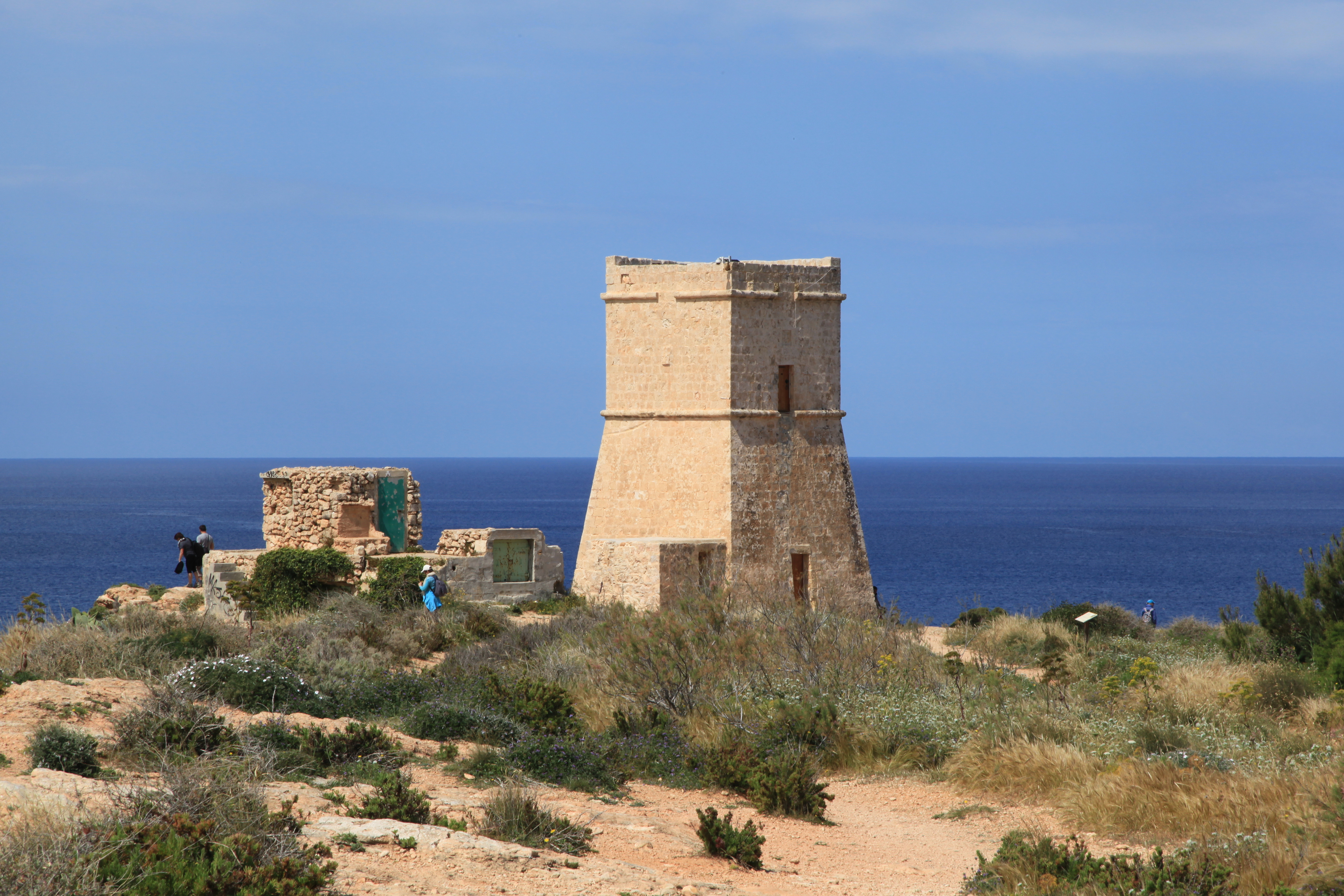
Għajn Tuffieħa Tower in Mġarr

Seven more towers were built between 1637 and 1638. These were much smaller than the Wignacourt towers, as they were built as watchtowers and a communication link to warn the Order's base in the Grand Harbour of an attack. In 1647, Saint Agatha's Tower was built in Mellieħa. This was a large tower intended as a strongpoint, and was built in the style of the Wignacourt towers. Two more towers were built at Dwejra and Xlendi on Gozo in 1650 and 1652. The ten towers built between 1637 and 1652 are collectively known as the Lascaris towers after the Grand Master who built them, and nine of them survive to this day.

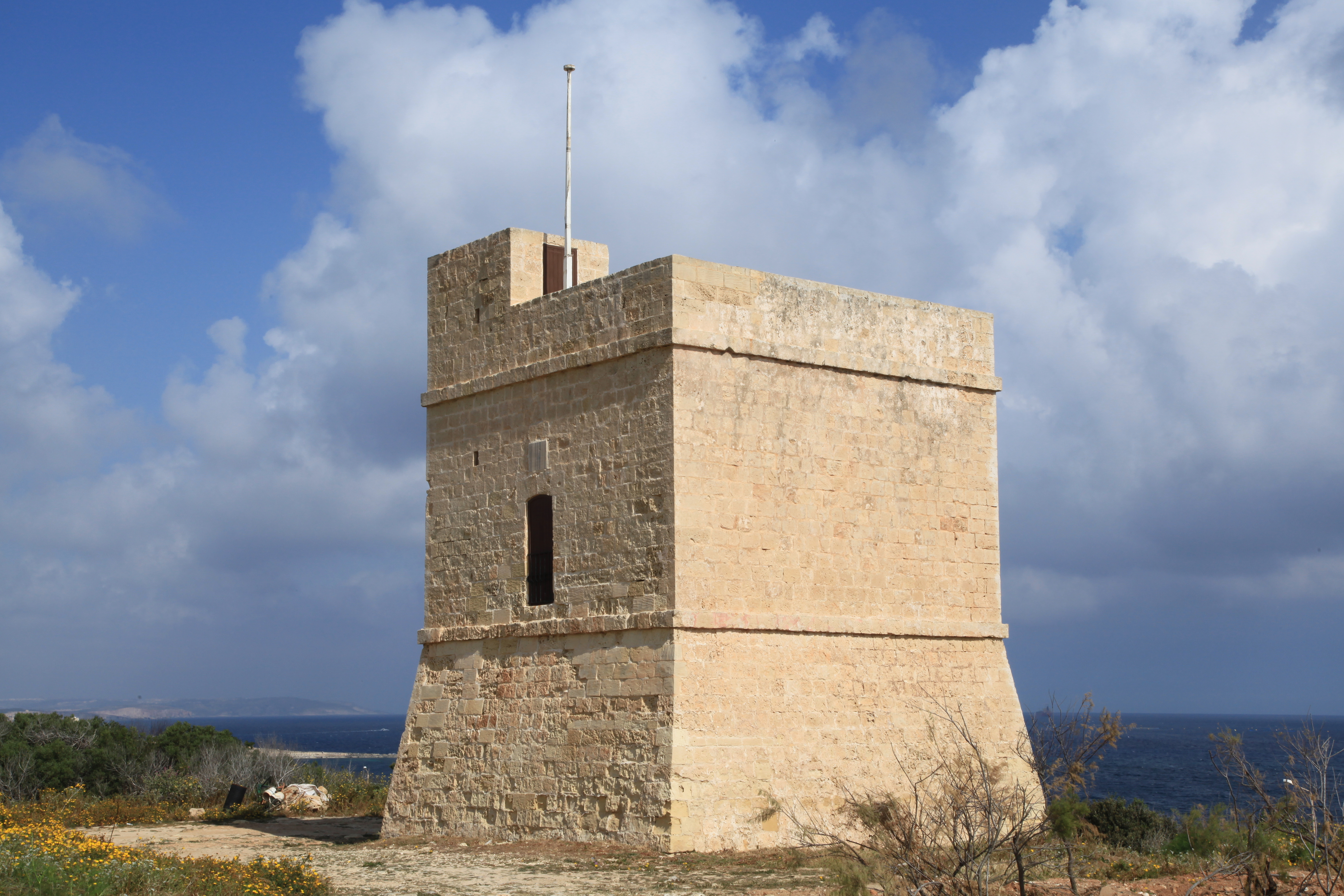
Għallis Tower in Naxxar

Another series of towers were built between 1658 and 1659. Fourteen towers were built in all, which are together known as the De Redin towers. These were based on the Lascaris towers and had the same function as a communication link. 13 towers were built on mainland Malta having an identical design, and 8 of these survive intact while 2 are in ruins. The fourteenth tower, Mġarr ix-Xini Tower, was built on Gozo in 1661 with a slightly different design.

The last coastal watchtower to be built was Sopu Tower, which was constructed in Gozo in 1667. The tower had almost collapsed but was rebuilt in the early 2000s and it is now in good condition.

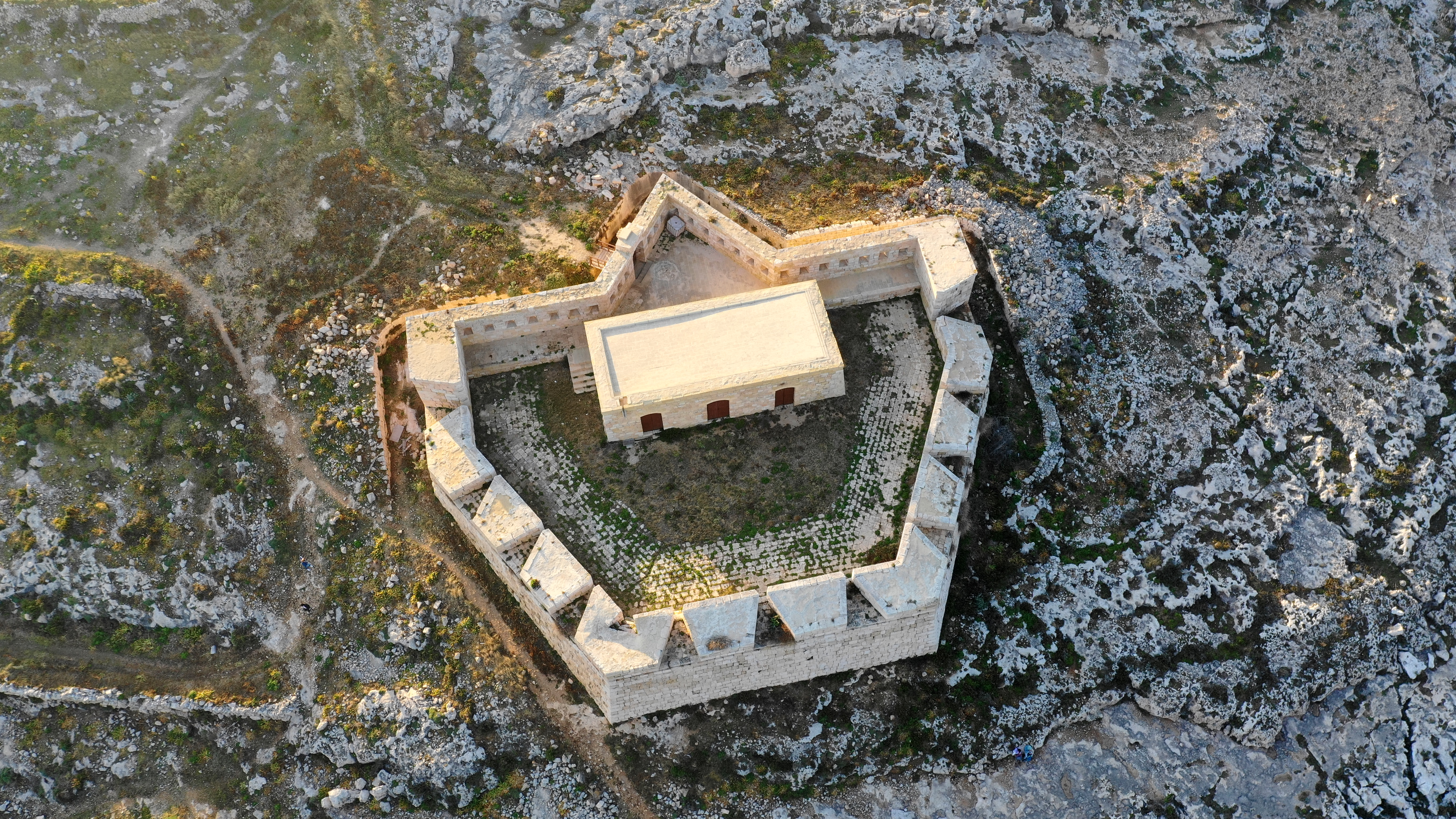
Aerial view of Saint Anthony's Battery in Qala, showing its redan, blockhouse and gun platform

From 1714 onwards, about 52 batteries and redoubts were built around the coasts of Malta and Gozo. A few of the batteries were built around existing coastal watchtowers, such as Qawra and Aħrax Towers. Most of the batteries were destroyed over the years or are in ruins, but a few are still more or less intact, including Mistra, Vendôme, Ferretti, St. Anthony's, Qolla l-Bajda and St. Mary's Batteries. Very few redoubts survive, including Briconet, Ximenes and St. George Redoubts. Various entrenchments were also built between the 1720s and 1760s, both around the coastline and along some inland positions. The remains of a few still survive today, including the Naxxar Entrenchment and the Louvier Entrenchment.

From 1749 to the 1760s, Fort Chambray was built on the island of Gozo. It was intended to be a new fortified city like Valletta, and eventually to replace the Cittadella as the island's capital. This was unsuccessful, and eventually only the fort was built. It saw some action during the French occupation of 1798, but its importance eventually diminished. It was converted into a hospital in the 19th century. In the 1990s, the interior of the fort began to be redeveloped, but the outer bastions and some barracks remain intact.

Between 1793 and 1795, Saint Lucian Tower and its battery were strengthened with a ditch and an entrenchment-like enclosure, and the complex was renamed Fort Rohan after the reigning Grand Master, Emmanuel de Rohan-Polduc. Most of the fortifications, with the exception of the tower itself, were dismantled and rebuilt by the British later on in the 19th century and the name Fort Rohan fell into disuse.

Apart from the knights' fortifications, over the years various individuals or families built their own fortifications. These were mainly fortified residences or private watchtowers. A notable surviving example is Mamo Tower, built in 1657 in Marsaskala.

== French occupation (1798–1800) ==
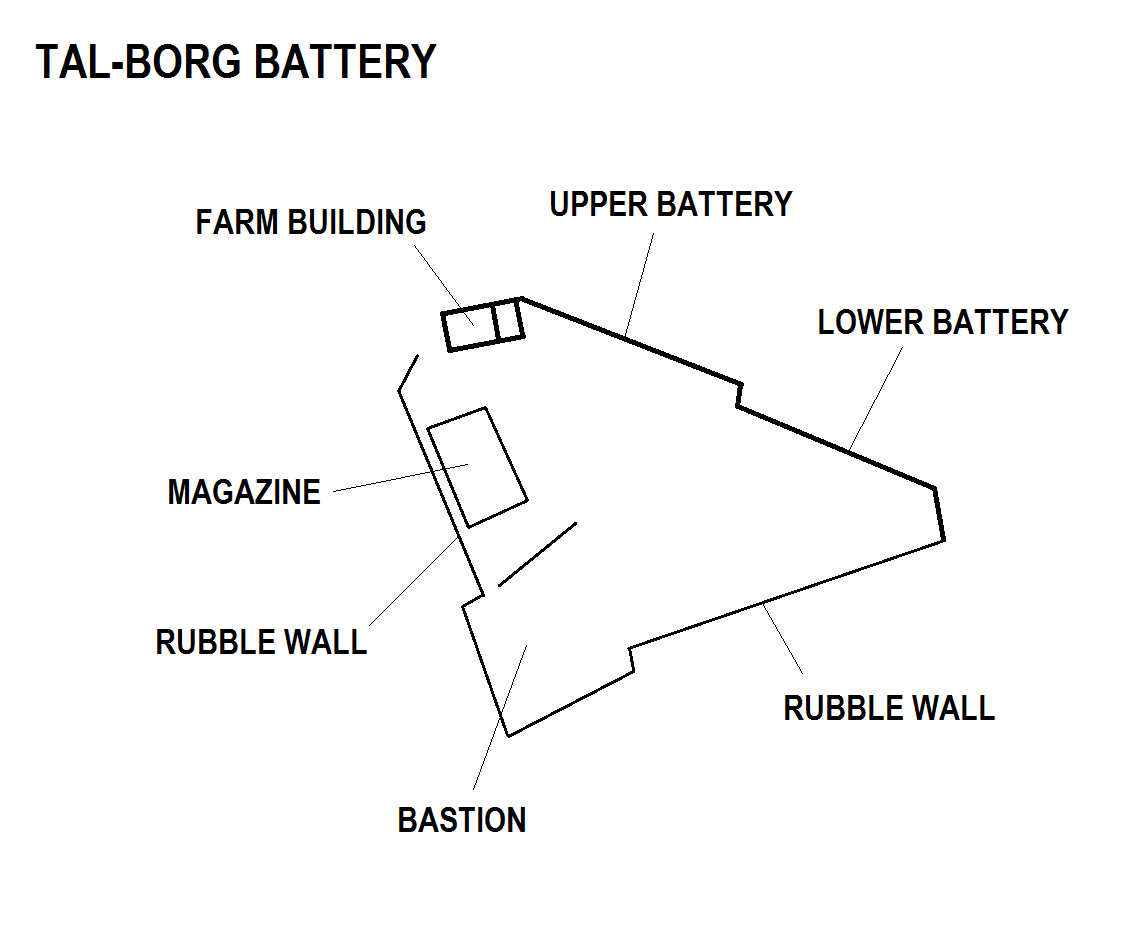
Map of Tal-Borg Battery, one of the batteries built by Maltese insurgents

The French evicted the Order from Malta during the Mediterranean campaign of 1798, and the Order surrendered after a couple of days. The Maltese, although initially welcoming the French occupiers, rebelled after a couple of months due to a number of reforms and the looting of churches. The insurgents took control of Gozo which became briefly independent, as well as Mdina and the towns and villages of the main island, leaving the French blockaded in the well-defended harbour area.

The Maltese insurgents, helped by the British, hastily built various fortifications mainly intended to repel a possible French counter-attack, and at the same time also bombard French positions in the harbour area. The insurgents had various camps, and men in these camps were responsible for a number of batteries, redoubts and entrenchments in the vicinity. The most important batteries were the Corradino Batteries, Għargħar Battery, Tal-Borg Battery and Tas-Samra Battery.

The fortifications surrounded the entire harbour area, stretching all the way from Sliema to Kalkara. The design of the batteries was based on the coastal batteries and entrenchments built by the Order in the 18th century, while most of the entrenchments consisted of long stretches of rubble walls. They were armed by guns taken from coastal fortifications such as Saint Mary's Tower. The usefulness of the fortifications was tested in 1799 when a French counter-attack from Fort Manoel was repelled by the insurgent batteries.

None of these fortifications survive intact, although some pre-existing buildings that were used as blockhouses may still be seen. San Rocco Battery, one of the insurgents' fortifications, was the location where Fort Saint Rocco was built later on in the late 19th century.

== British fortifications (1800–1979) ==
=== Nineteenth and early twentieth centuries ===
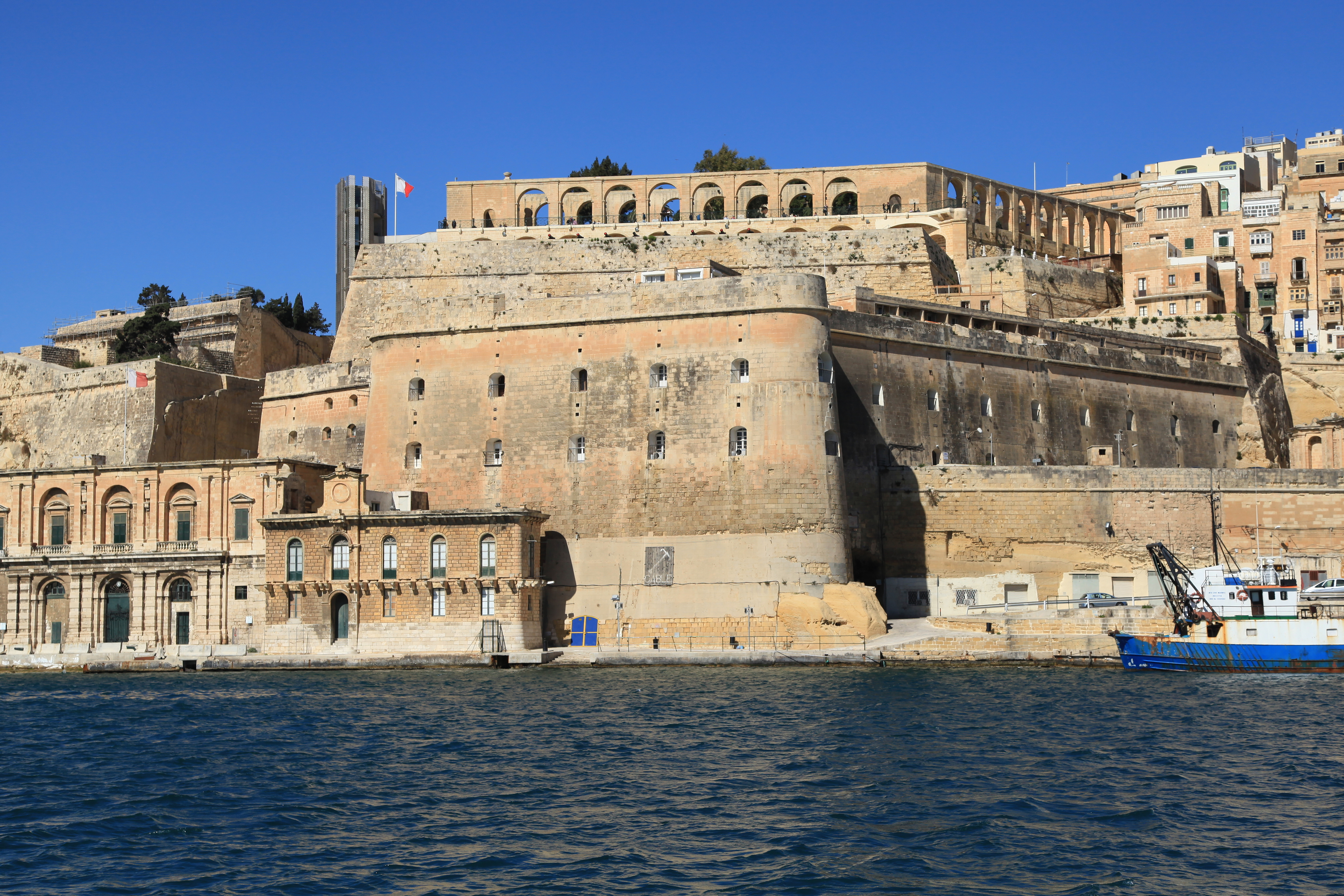
Lascaris Battery in Valletta

The British took over the Maltese islands as a protectorate in 1800, and later as a colony in 1813. They initially used the Hospitaller fortifications without any alterations. Under the military theory of the time, the Royal Navy's Mediterranean Fleet was regarded as the most reliable protection against invasion, and in fact the British Civil Commissioner, Henry Pigot, wanted to demolish the majority of Valletta's fortifications in 1801, although this was never done. During the British period, the various forts of the Order were rearmed, refitted and altered a number of times to keep up with the latest military technology.

In the 1850s, the British built Fort Verdala and St. Clement's Retrenchment in the Cottonera area, while Lascaris Battery was built in Valletta. Later on in the 19th century, parts of the Cottonera Lines, Santa Margherita Lines and the fortifications of Senglea were demolished to make way for extensions of the Malta Dockyard. Throughout the 19th and 20th centuries, the British built barracks in various parts of the island, such as Tigné Point and Pembroke.

In 1866, Colonel William Jervois produced a report entitled "Memorandum with reference to the improvements to the defences of Malta and Gibraltar, rendered necessary by the introduction of Iron Plated Ships and powerful rifled guns", in which he gave Malta (along with Gibraltar, Halifax and Bermuda) the status of an "imperial fortress". A programme to improve Malta's fortifications began soon after, and a number of new polygonal forts and batteries were built, including Sliema Point Battery (1872), Fort St. Rocco (1872–73) and Fort Leonardo (1875–78).

From 1871 to 1880, the Corradino Lines were built on the Corradino Heights. The V-shaped trace and ditch were meant to protect the dockyard and harbour from landward attacks. They were abandoned in the early 1900s due to advancements in technology, although they saw some use once again in World War II.

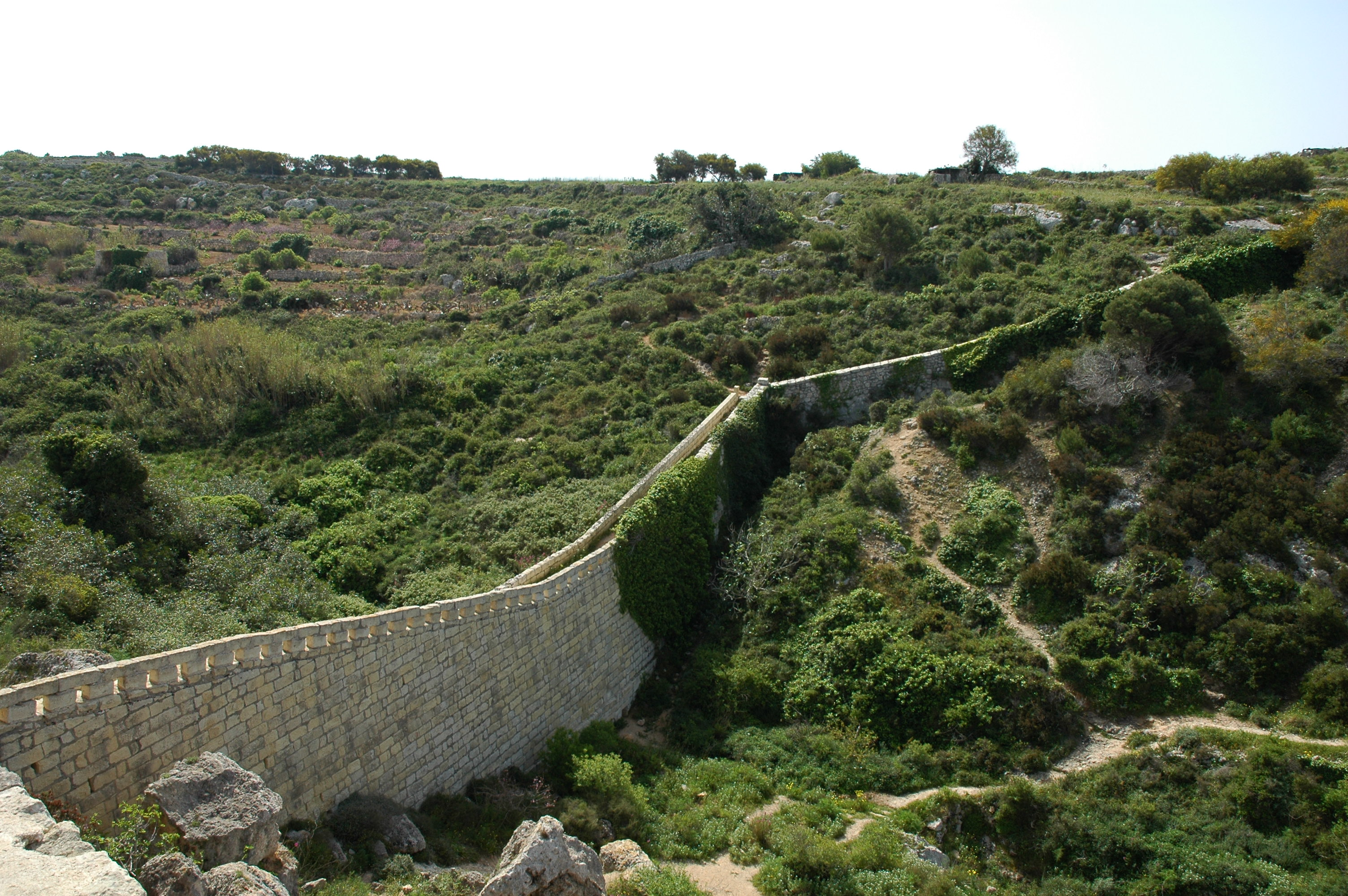
Victoria Lines on the border between Mġarr and Rabat

Starting from 1875, the Victoria Lines, originally known as the North West Front, were built along the northern part of Malta, dividing it from the more heavily populated south. The system of defences consisted of a line of fortifications flanked by defensive towers, along with entrenchments and gun emplacements. Several artillery batteries were planned, but only San Giovanni Battery and Tarġa Battery were actually built. Three forts were also built along the lines: Fort Binġemma, Fort Madalena and Fort Mosta. The lines were completed in 1899, but exercises in 1900 proved that they were of dubious defensive value, and the entire system was decommissioned in 1907, with the exception of the coastal towers. Today, parts of the lines have collapsed but other parts in the countryside, including the three forts, still survive. Another fort, Fort Pembroke, was built between 1875 and 1878 to cover the gap between the Victoria Lines and the harbour area.

The British also built a number of forts to protect Marsaxlokk Harbour. These included Fort San Lucian (1874–78), Fort Delimara (1876–88), Fort Tas-Silġ (1879–83). In 1881 and 1882, Saint Paul's Battery and Żonqor Battery were built in Marsaxlokk and Marsaskala respectively.

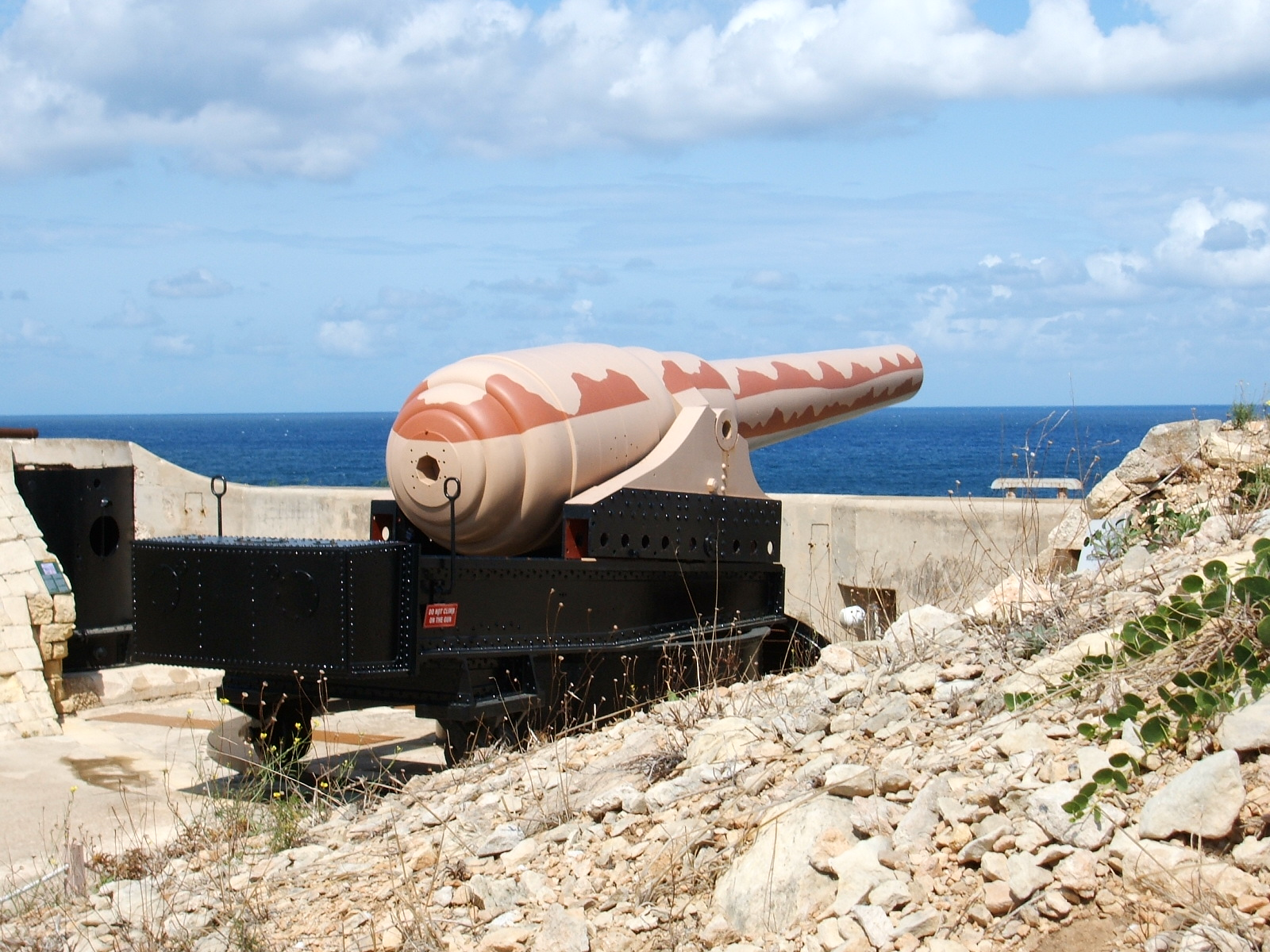
100-ton gun at Rinella Battery

Following the arming of the Italian ironclads Duilio and Enrico Dandolo with 100-ton guns, the British feared an Italian attack on Malta, as the ships could fire on Malta's batteries, destroying them one after the other, while keeping outside their guns' range. To prevent this, the British requested that four 100-ton guns be built. Two of these were installed in Malta, and Cambridge Battery and Rinella Battery were built specifically to house these guns. Construction of the batteries began in 1878 and they were complete by 1886. The gun at Rinella still exists.

From 1888 to 1910, a new series of fortifications were built to house breech-loading guns. These were Della Grazie Battery, Spinola Battery, Garden Battery, Wolseley Battery, Pembroke Battery and Fort Benghisa. The latter was the last polygonal fort to be built in Malta.

=== World Wars and aftermath ===
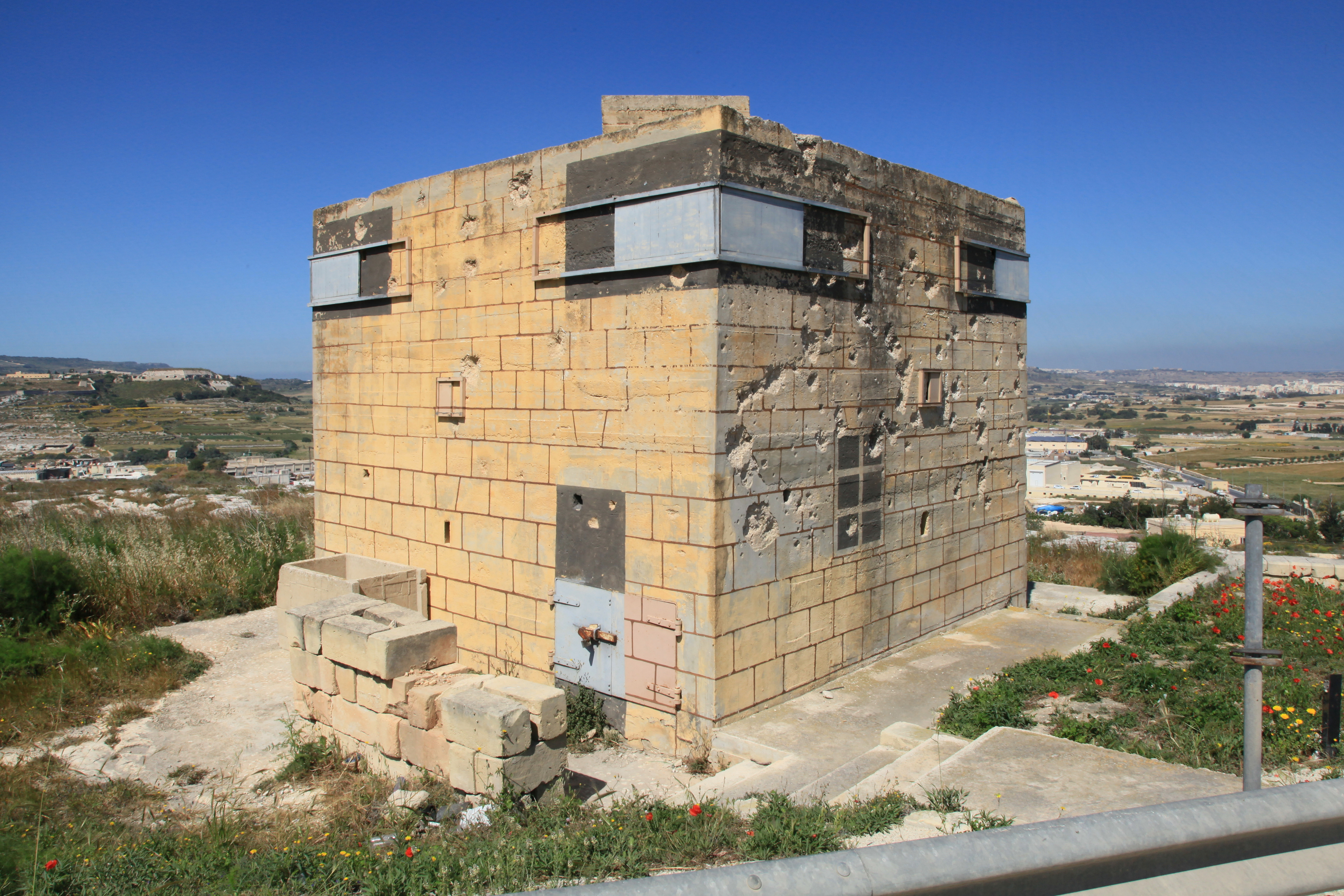
Reserve Post R15, a World War II-era pillbox in Naxxar

After the early 20th century, few fortifications were built in Malta. However, new military installations such as airfields began to be built in World War I, when the seaplane base of RAF Kalafrana and the airfield at Marsa were built. More airfields were built in the interwar period and the Second World War, including RAF Hal Far, RAF Ta Kali, RAF Luqa, RAF Safi, RAF Krendi and Ta' Lambert Airfield.

From the Abyssinian Crisis of 1935 onwards, the British built many pillboxes in Malta for defence in case of an Italian invasion. Many others were built during World War II. Many pillboxes still exist, especially on the north eastern part of the island. A few of them have been restored and are cared for, but many others were demolished. Some pillboxes are still being destroyed as they are not considered to have any architectural or historic value.

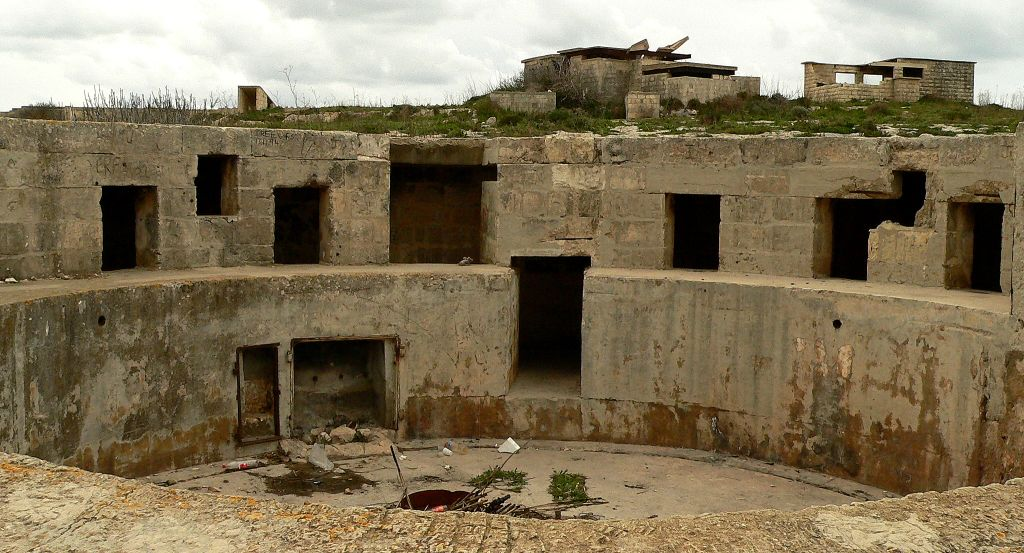
Ruins of Fort Campbell in Mellieħa

The last fort to be built in Malta was Fort Campbell, which was built near Mellieħa between late 1937 and 1938. The design of the fort is completely different from the earlier fortifications in Malta as it was designed to counter the new threat of aerial bombardment. It had an irregular plan and its perimeter was guarded by machine gun posts and a few rifle loopholes. The buildings inside were scattered so as not to create a concentration of buildings. The fort still exists, although it is largely in ruins.

During the Second World War, the Lascaris War Rooms were built in Valletta to serve as the war headquarters for the defence of Malta. They were later used in the headquarters of the Allied invasion of Sicily. Throughout the war, many air-raid shelters also were dug in the limestone rock of the islands, either by the government or by individuals or families, to protect the civilian population of Malta from Italian or German aerial bombardment. Many of the shelters still exist, and a few are open to the public.

Many anti-aircraft batteries, gun positions and radar stations were also built throughout the course of the war.

Many of the fortifications were decommissioned between the 1950s and 1970s. Some were left abandoned while others were used for a variety of purposes, such as private residences, restaurants, police stations or farms. Some barracks, such as those at Mtarfa and Pembroke, were converted to housing estates.

Several forts and historic military buildings are still in use by the Armed Forces of Malta, such as Luqa Barracks, Fort Madalena and Fort Mosta.

== Present day ==
=== Conservation and restoration ===
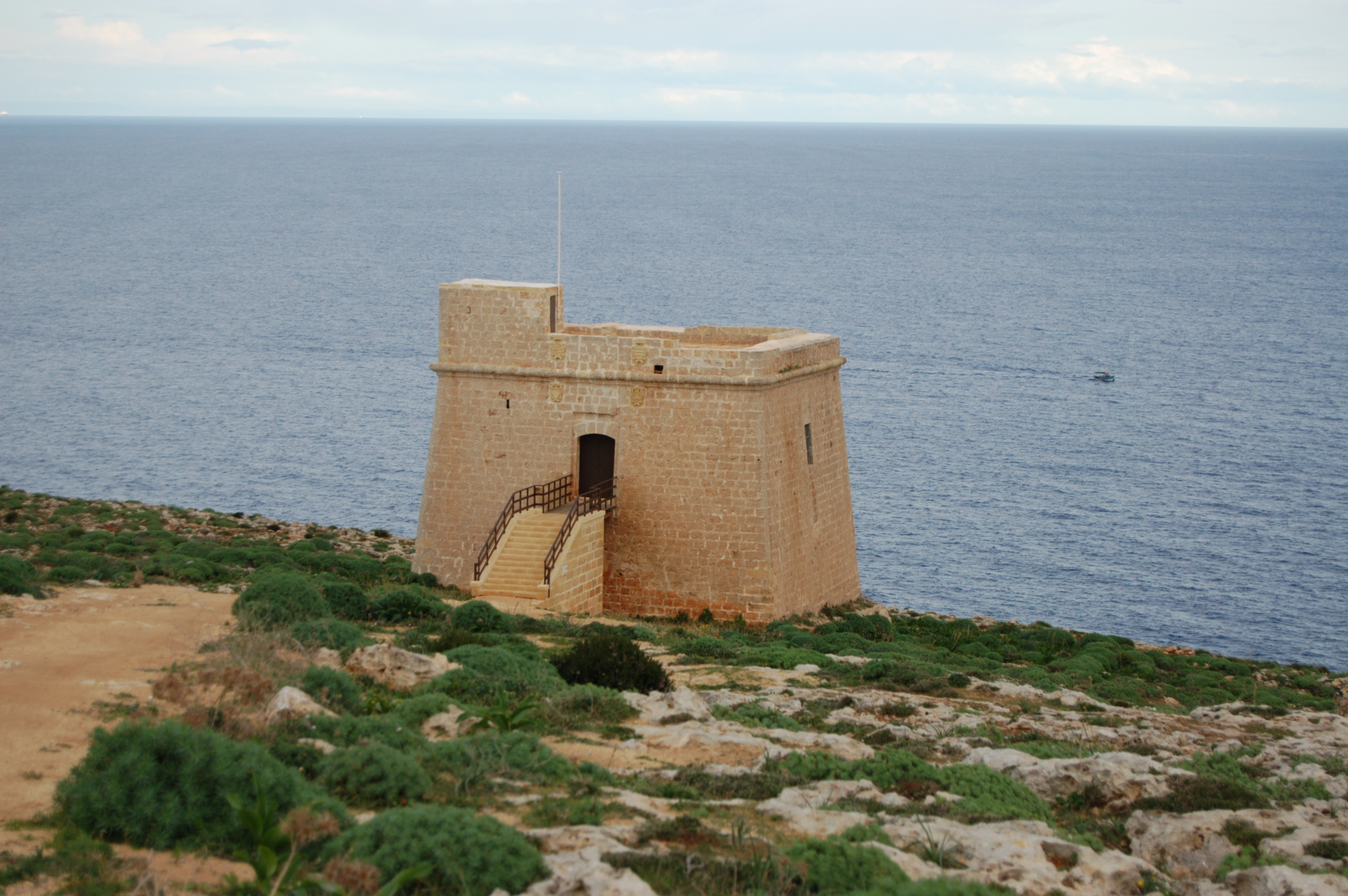
The restored Sopu Tower in 2006. Prior to restoration it had almost completely collapsed.

Today, the architectural and historical value of Malta's fortifications is widely acknowledged, and many also serve as tourist attractions. All fortifications were included on the Antiquities List of 1925, and virtually all surviving Hospitaller fortifications are now listed on the National Inventory of the Cultural Property of the Maltese Islands, Malta's national heritage register. The fortified city of Valletta has been listed as a World Heritage Site by UNESCO since 1980. The other fortifications around Malta's harbour area, the fortified cities of Mdina and the Cittadella, as well as the Victoria Lines have been on the tentative list of World Heritage Sites since 1998.

From the 1970s onwards, some of the fortifications, especially those which were abandoned, became dilapidated and often vandalized. However, since the beginning of the 21st century, a number of fortifications have been restored or are undergoing restoration.

The National Trust of Malta, Din l-Art Ħelwa, was responsible for the restoration of a number of Hospitaller coastal fortifications from the 1970s onwards. Towers and batteries restored by Din l-Art Ħelwa include Wignacourt Tower (1975–76 and 2003), Mamo Tower (1994–95), Għallis Tower (1995), St. Mary's Battery (1996–97 and 2003–04), Dwejra Tower (1997), St. Mark's Tower (1997–98), St. Agatha's Tower (1999–2001), St. Mary's Tower (2002 and 2005) and Sopu Tower (2004). Din l-Art Ħelwa is currently restoring St. Anthony's Battery and Xlendi Tower.

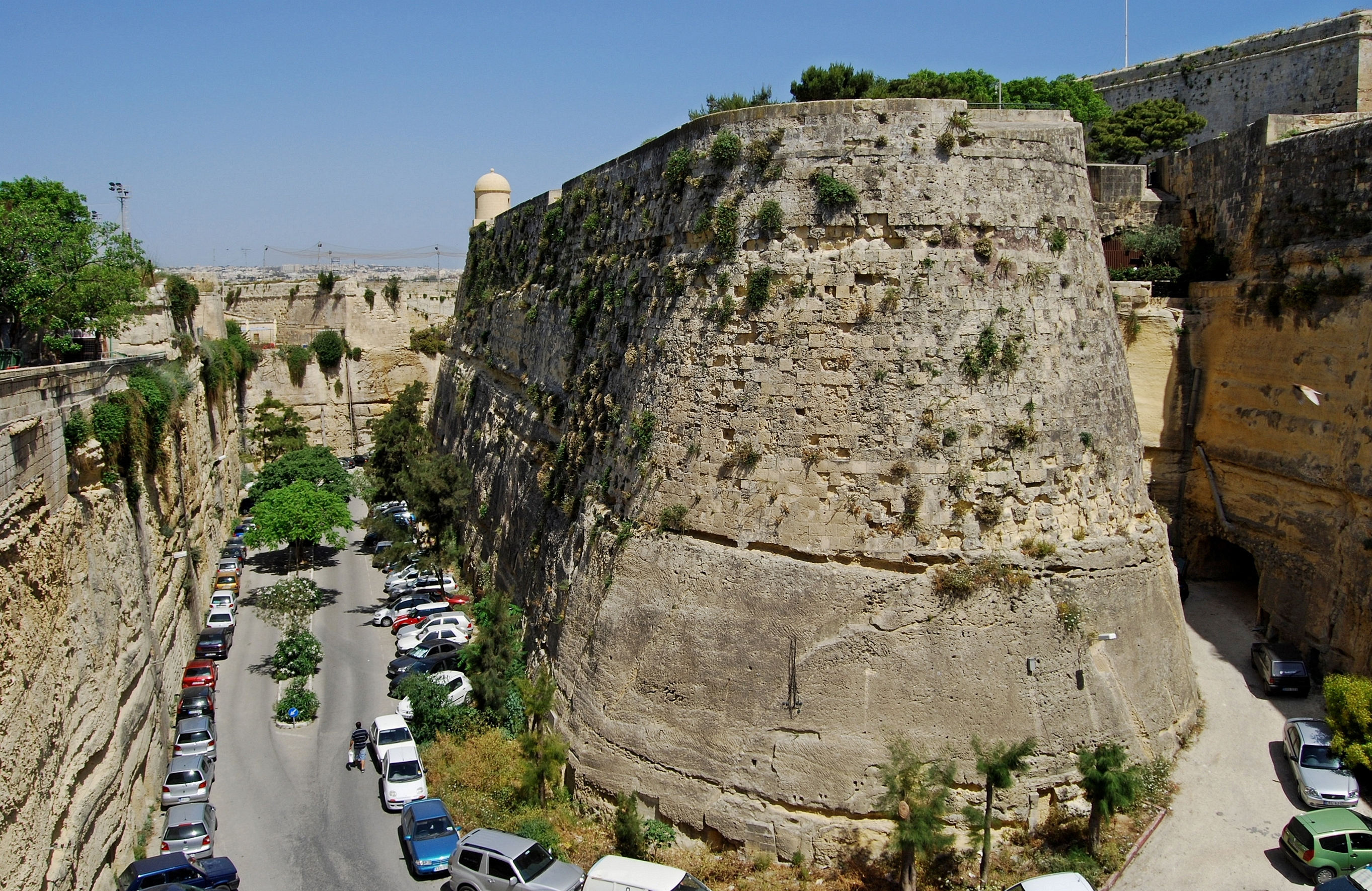
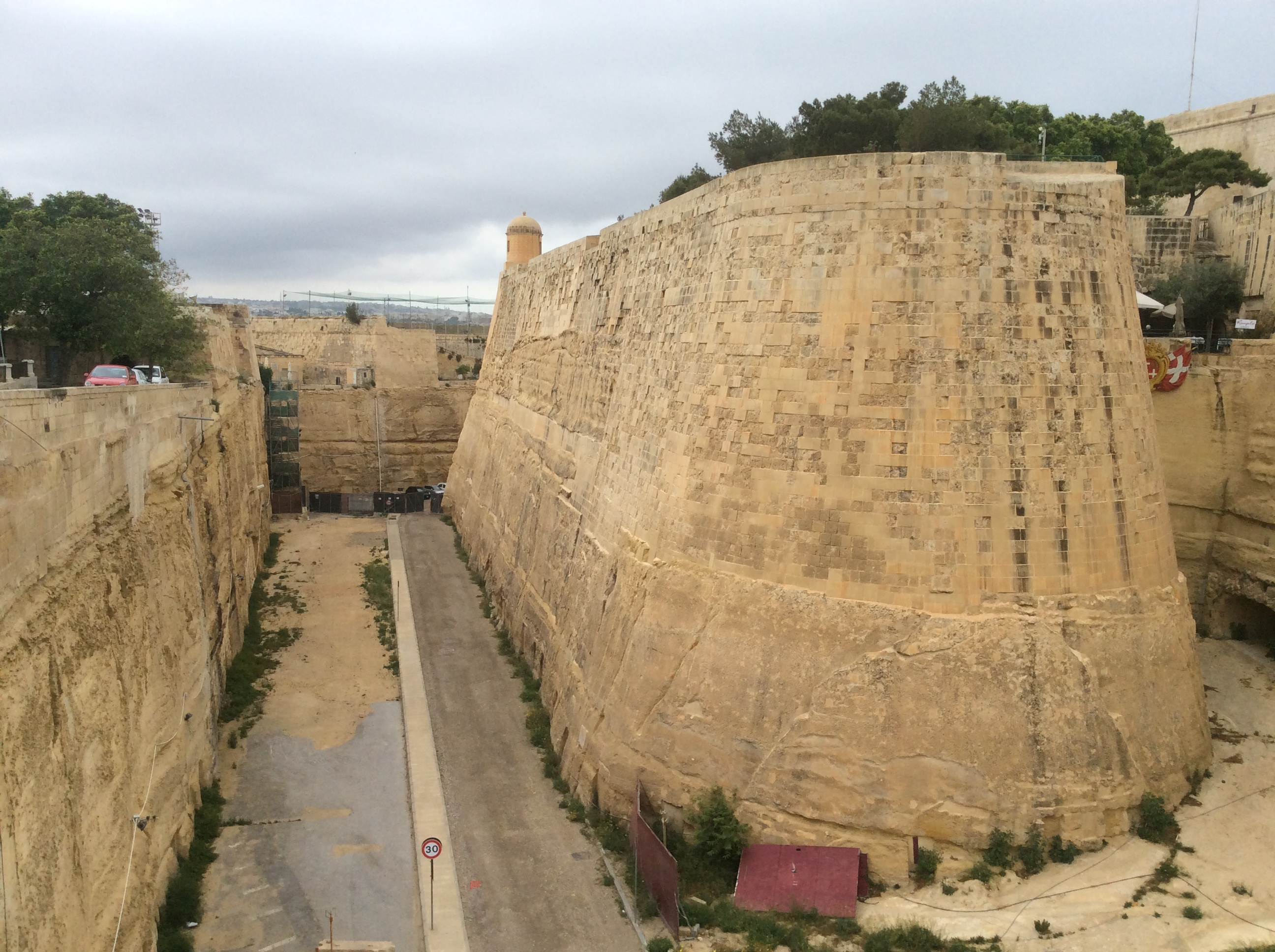
St. John's Bastion and the ditch of Valletta before and after restoration

Fondazzjoni Wirt Artna also restored a number of Maltese fortifications, including the Saluting Battery and Rinella Battery. It is currently restoring Mistra Battery.

From 2001 onwards, MIDI plc began restoration of Fort Manoel as part of its Manoel Island project. The restoration included rebuilding the Chapel of St Anthony of Padua, which had been bombed in World War II. In 2008, MIDI also restored Fort Tigné as part of its development of Tigné Point. The 19th century Garden Battery, which was believed to have been destroyed in the World War II, was rediscovered during the Tigné Point project, and MIDI decided to restore it as well.

The first plans to restore the fortifications of Valletta, Birgu, Mdina and the Cittadella were made in 2006.

In 2008, restoration began in Mdina, Birgu and the Cittadella. In Mdina, some of the bastions had started to slip down the clay slopes, and steel rods were inserted in the walls to reinforce them. Throughout the course of restoration, a number of archaeological remains have been found, including remains of Mdina's Punic-Roman and medieval walls, a bastion and a caponier in Birgu, the Cittadella's original entrance, and a number of other features.

In Valletta, restoration started in 2010, with the project being described as "the biggest in a century". Squatters were evicted from public lands around the fortifications. Restoration of the upper part of Fort Saint Elmo was completed in 2015. The Chapel of St Roche on St Michael's Counterguard, which was bombed in World War II, was rebuilt in 2014 as part of the restoration.

Parts of the fortifications of Senglea began to be restored in 2015.

In 2024, the Maltese Government added Grade 1 protection to the following 11 fortifications:

- Della Grazie Battery
- Saint Peter's Battery
- Wolseley Battery
- Għargħar Battery
- Misrah Strenjnu AA Battery
- San Giovanni Battery
- Saint Paul's Battery
- Wardija Battery
- Żonqor Battery
- Garden Battery
- Cambridge Battery

=== Fortifications Interpretation Centre ===
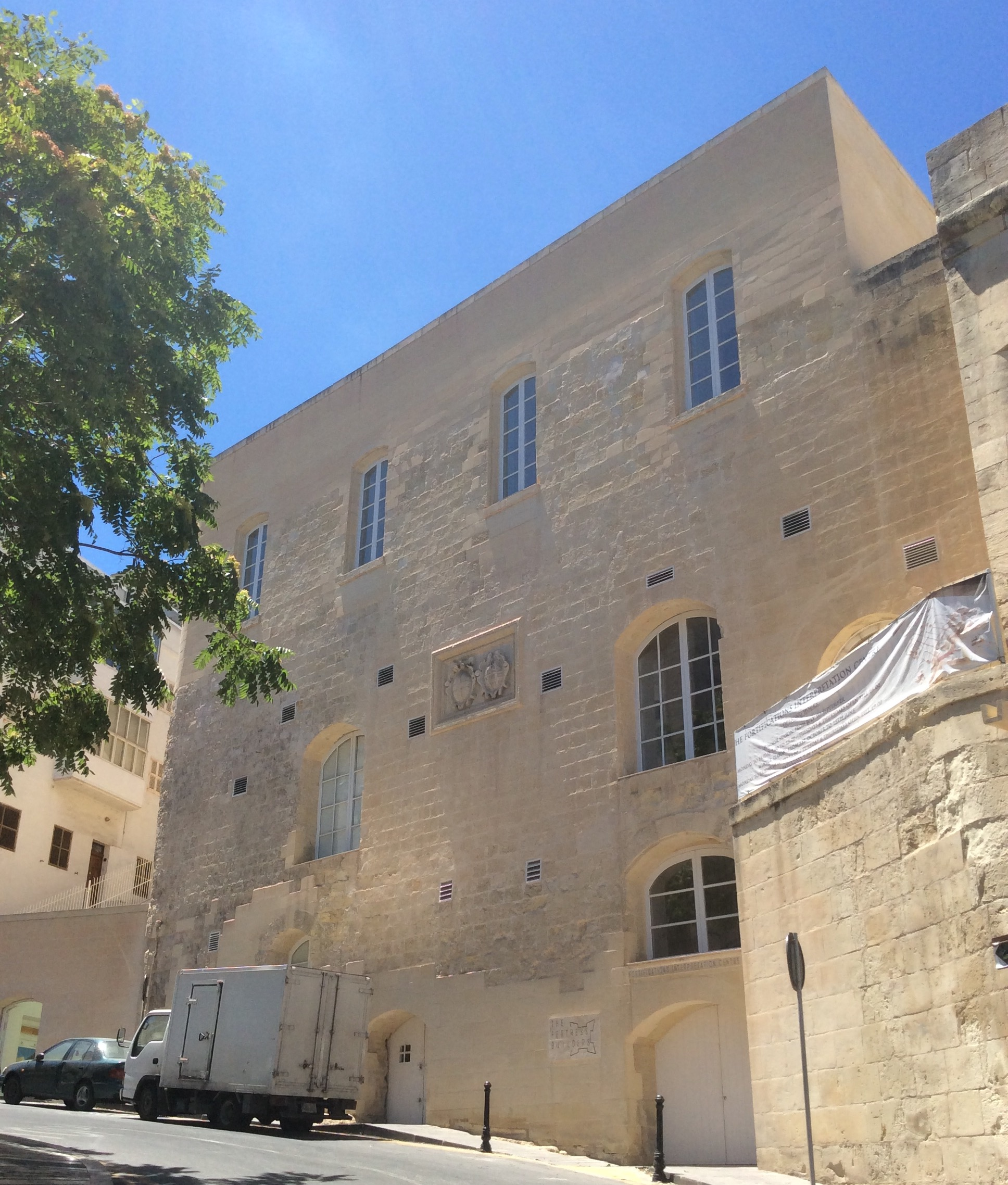
The Fortifications Interpretation Centre

The Fortifications Interpretation Centre (FIC) is a public institution dedicated to communicating and exhibiting Malta's military architecture. It is located in a building adjoining Saint Andrew's Bastion, part of the city walls of Valletta. The building was originally a bombproof magazine and artillery school that was built sometime during the reign of Hugues Loubenx de Verdalle in the late 16th century. The uppermost floor had been destroyed in World War II and the rest of the building was subsequently used as an examination hall. The building was restored and the upper floor rebuilt in a project co-financed by the European Regional Development Fund, and the FIC was opened on 16 February 2013.

The FIC includes information guides on the fortifications of Malta, going back to the first fortifications at Borġ in-Nadur and focusing especially on those built by the Order and the British. It contains models of Maltese forts, as well as informative panels describing fortifications around the world, thus putting Malta's fortifications in context.

== Heraldry ==
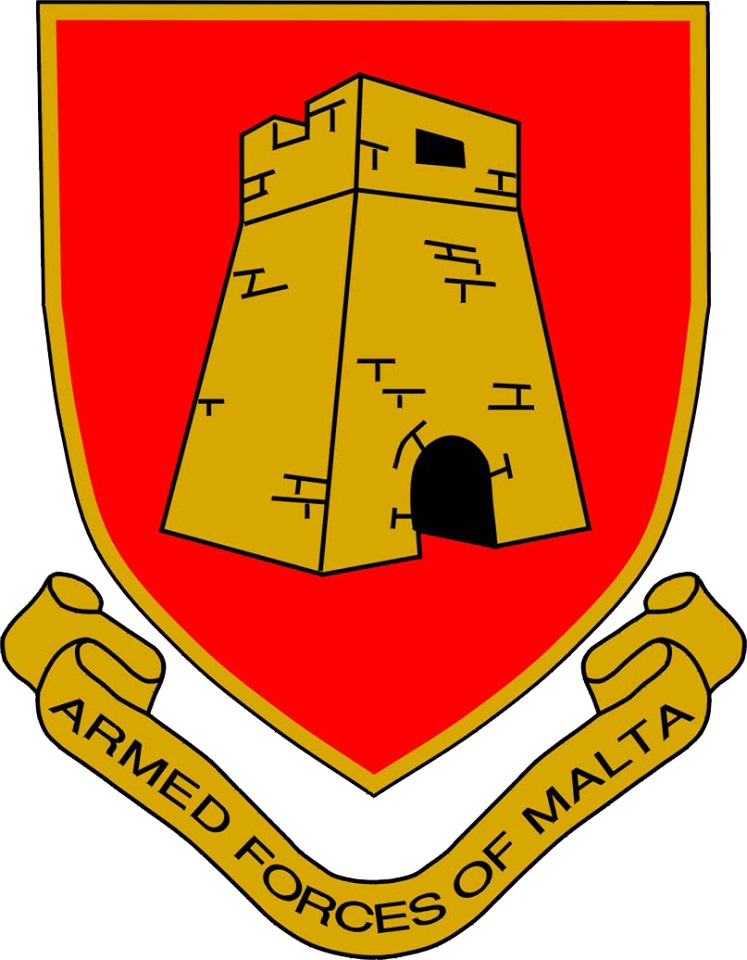
A De Redin tower on the coat of arms of the Armed Forces of Malta

Malta's fortifications are featured a number of times on the islands' heraldry. The coat of arms of Malta contains a mural crown in gold with a sally port and eight turrets (five of which are visible), which represents the fortifications as well as Malta's status as a city-state. The coats of arms of the five regions of Malta have a similar crown but with five turrets, all of which are visible. A mural crown with four visible turrets can be seen on the coats of arms of Valletta, Mdina and Birgu, indicating their status as capital city or former capitals. Another version with four turrets (three visible) can be seen on the coats of arms of Cospicua, Senglea, Qormi, Siġġiewi, Żabbar, Żebbuġ, Żejtun and Victoria, indicating the status of a city.

The coat of arms of Xgħajra features a heraldic representation of Santa Maria delle Grazie Tower, a now-demolished Wignacourt tower. In addition, De Redin towers are featured on the coats of arms of the Armed Forces of Malta (as well as its Air Wing), the Malta Stock Exchange, and the town of Pembroke. The coat of arms of Mtarfa feature a representation of Mtarfa Barracks, reflecting the role of the British military in the founding of the town.

== See also ==
- List of fortifications in Malta
- Fortifications of Rhodes
- Fortifications of Gibraltar
