= Misrah Strenjnu AA Battery =

British anti-aircraft battery on Malta

The Misrah Strejnu Anti-Aircraft (AA) Battery is a British fortification located on the small Mediterranean island of Malta, south of Sicily. The site is now a protected monument as of Oct. 2024.

== History ==
The exact date of the Misrah Strenju Battery's construction date is unknown, but since it was armed with newer anti-aircraft guns, and is from World War II, it is assumed to have been built shortly before or during the war. The battery was armed with 4 Vickers QF 3.7-inch AA guns on concrete pads. The guns were located on pads in a semi-circular fashion. Not much info exists online about the battery, and is one of the least heard of the fortifications on Malta. The pads from the guns still exist, but are in a farmer's field. The battery was decommissioned in 1979, when the last British troops withdrew. As of Oct. 2024, the site has been granted a Grade 1 protection by the Maltese Government, which is the highest possible.

== See also ==
- San Giovanni Battery
- Fort Saint Elmo
- Fortifications of Malta
