= Coat of arms of Malta =

Versions
- The banner of arms, which serves as national flag
- Armiger: Republic of Malta as well as: Myriam Spiteri Debono, President of Malta; Robert Abela, Prime Minister of Malta; Cabinet of Malta; Parliament of Malta; Judiciary of Malta; National Audit Office; Heads of Maltese diplomatic missions (ambassadors, consuls, etc); Maltese civil law notaries
- Adopted: 28 October 1988
- Crest: A mural crown with a sally port and five vedettes.
- Shield: Flag of Malta: Per pale argent and gules, a representation of George Cross argent fimbriated gules in Dexter Chief
- Supporters: Dexter, An olive branch; sinister, a palm branch in vert all in their proper colours, tied at base with a ribbon argent, backed gules and upon which is written in capital letters sable the name of the country in the Maltese language.
- Motto: Repubblika ta' Malta

The coat of arms of Malta is the national coat of arms of the country of Malta.

The present coat of arms is described by the Emblem and Public Seal of Malta Act of 1988 as a shield showing an heraldic representation of the national flag of Malta; above the shield a mural crown in gold with a sally port and five turrets representing the fortifications of Malta and denoting a city-state; and around the shield a wreath of two branches: the dexter of olive, the sinister of palm, symbols of peace and traditionally associated with Malta, all in their proper colours, tied at base with a white ribbon, backed red and upon which are written the words Repubblika ta' Malta (“Republic of Malta” in Maltese) in capital letters in black.

Presidential Standard of Malta

The national coat of arms also appears on the Presidential Standard of Malta.

The various coats of arms appear on passports, excise stamps, official documents and various other uses. Many Maltese coins feature a coat of arms, most notably the second series of the Maltese lira, some Maltese euro coins, and many gold or silver commemorative coins (either denominated in the Maltese lira or in euro). Coats of arms were featured various times on Maltese postage stamps as well.

== Coats of arms between 1800 and 1964 ==
Malta was a British protectorate from 1800 to 1813 and a colony from 1813 to 1964. The coat of arms used in Malta was the arms of Great Britain:

1800–1801

1801–1816

1816–1837

1901–1952

1952–1964

However, Malta had three colonial badges between 1875 and 1964. The first (1875 – c. 1898) showed a white Maltese cross on a white and red panel, the second (c. 1898 – 1943) showed a white and red shield (like the arms of Mdina), and the third (1943–1964) was like the 1898 arms, but with a George Cross on a blue canton on the white half. All three badges were featured on the Maltese state ensigns and the Governor's flag:

1875 – c. 1898

c. 1898 – 1943

1943–1964

== Coat of arms between 1964 and 1975 ==
Coat of arms of Malta from 1964 to 1975

Coat of arms of the Governor-General of Malta

This coat of arms was adopted upon independence on 21 September 1964. It depicts two dolphins which support a depiction of the Maltese flag, one with palm branch and the other with an olive twig representing victory and peace respectively. Above is a mural crown shaped like a fort with five octagonal turrets surmounts a helmet, with red and white ribbons. Below are blue waves representing the surrounding Mediterranean Sea, the Maltese eight-pointed Cross representing the connection with the Order of St. John as well as courage and determination. The ribbon under the shield has the motto Virtute et Constantia (by Valour and Firmness). Nowadays, this motto is used by the National Order of Merit.

A version with a statant guardant lion on the St Edward's Crown instead of the mural crown was also used, and this served as the coat of arms of the Governor-General of Malta.

== Emblem between 1975 and 1988 ==
Emblem of Malta from 1975 to 1988

The emblem was adopted on the 11 July 1975, seven months after Malta became a republic. It displayed an illustration of a coastal scene with a rising sun, a traditional Maltese boat, a shovel and a pitchfork, and an Opuntia. Underneath the image the then-new name of the state Repubblika ta' Malta (Republic of Malta) was written.

The Maltese Prime Minister, Dom Mintoff, wanted to change the 1964 coat of arms as he mistook the mural crown as representing royalty and therefore believed the symbol had no place on the new republican Malta's coat of arms. Mintoff chose a class of art students taught by Esprit Barthet to create a design to be used on the covers of passports, and a design by Edward Abela was chosen. A final design was agreed upon and the new passports were printed and the design was officially adopted as the emblem of Malta.

The emblem was controversial as it was inspired by socialist principles and accordingly non-heraldic, it was replaced by the current coat of arms soon after the Nationalists won the 1987 election. The new government proposed that the 1964 coat of arms be readopted, but following contention a simplified version was chosen. The new coat of arms was designed by Adrian Strickland, who prepared preliminary sketches, and Robert Calì, who finished the design.

== See also ==
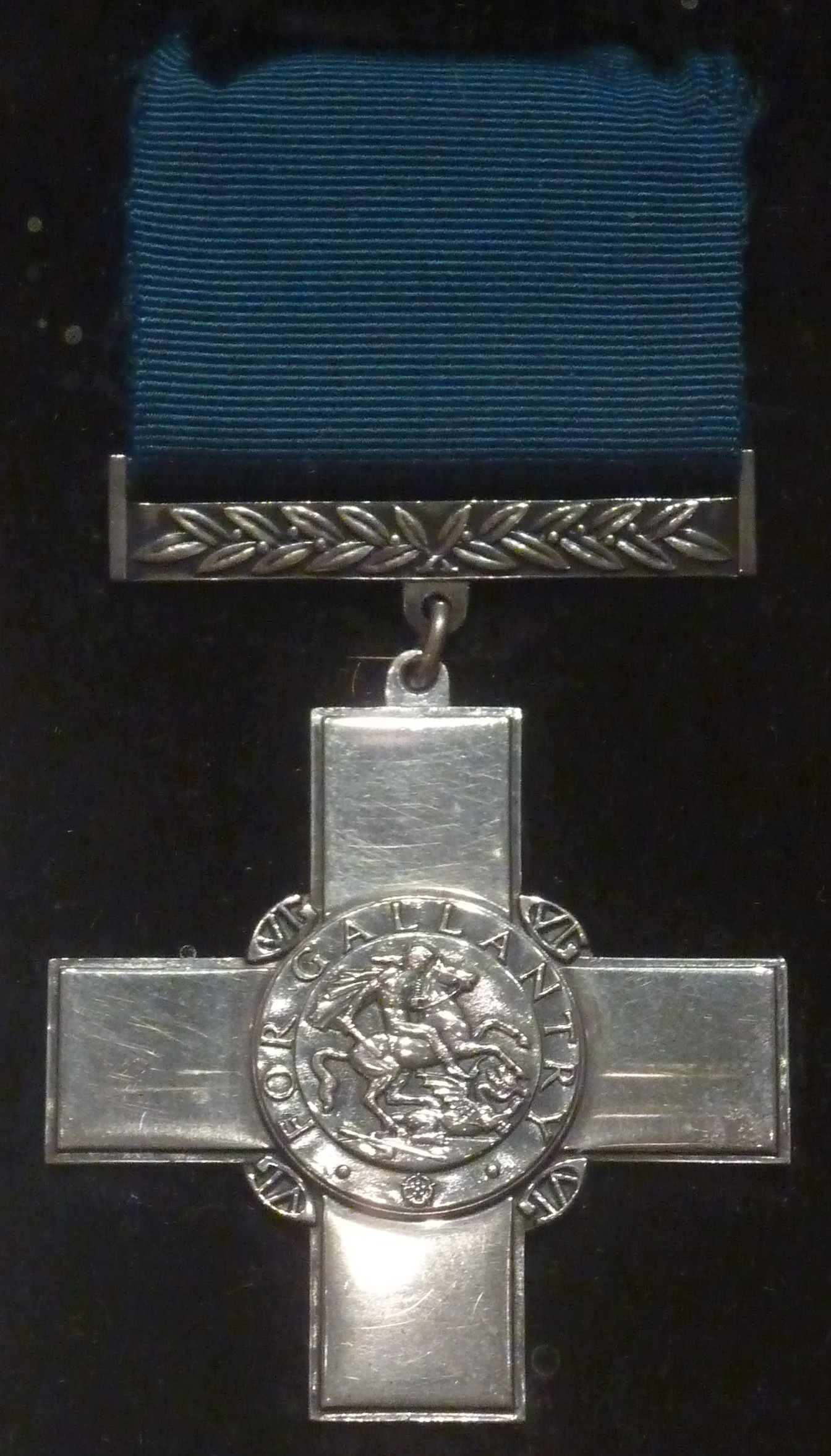
The George Cross awarded to Malta (National War Museum, Malta)

- Flag of Malta
- History of Malta
- Culture of Malta
- Politics of Malta
- Maltese heraldry
