= Maltese heraldry =

Maltese heraldry is the design, display, and study of armorial bearings as used in the traditions of Malta.

== History ==
Heraldry originated in the form known today in the second quarter of the 12th century as a means of identification on the battlefield.

This concept was first used in Malta with the granting of the title of 'Baron of Fiddien' to the Santa Sofia family in 1287, marking the ascendancy of the first noble families in the country, which characterised the 13th century.

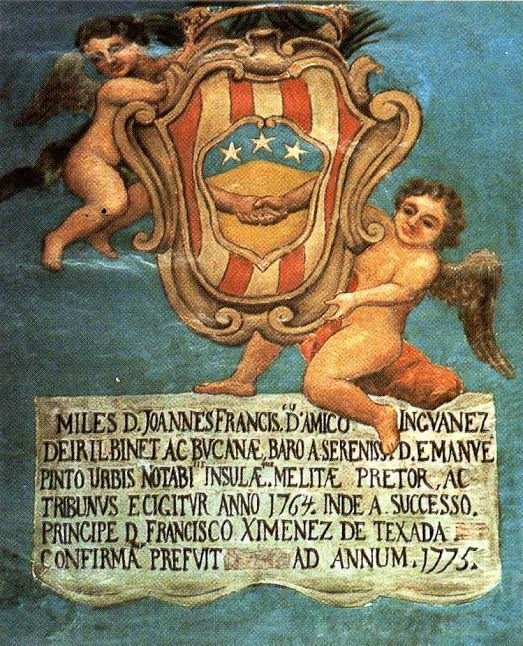
The coat of arms of Baron Gio Francesco D’Amico Inguanez, 1775

Most of these early titles and their corresponding coat of arms were feudal titles granted for military service to the crown, with some others being purchased.

All except two of these Maltese ancient feudal titles are now extinct, with the earliest surviving one dating back to the Kingdom of Sicily in 1350.

With decline in the use of armour, the original purpose of heraldry grew fainter as the centuries passed by. However its presence had become deeply rooted in society, hence its persistence to this day.

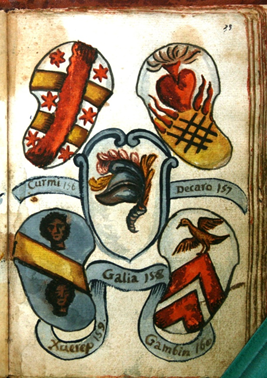
Maltese surnames- Curmi, Decaro, Xuerep, Galia and Gambin coat of arms

Arms started to be granted not only to aristocrats but also to people of stature as means of identification in times of high illiteracy.

The majority of the titles still used in Malta today were created during the period of the Knights of St. John. These titles were mostly nominally feudal; a few were actually tied to estates already held by the grantee, e.g., Tabria, Gomerino, delle Mori (Catena), and other foreign titles were simply recognized by the Grandmasters. Most of these titles were purchases.

Under Napoleon's revolutionary government between 1798 and 1800, heraldry was abolished and most existing patents were burned. With the subsequent arrival of the British however, Malta's indigenous nobility resurfaced. The controversial Royal Commission Report of 1878 created The Maltese Nobility.

Some later titles were created by reigning Pontiffs. Subsequently, 'bona fide' foreign titles have also been created by other sources who held the Fons Honorum.

Maltese titles can be inherited in different ways, as there is no general Salic law in Malta. Some can even be inherited by nomination.

In 1975, the Ġieħ ir-Repubblika Act removed official state recognition of all nobility titles, but their use is not banned by law, and they are freely used in Malta. The abundance of heraldic material on several Maltese buildings, churches, monuments, and documents attests to the sustained importance of this institution throughout our history and thus the need for its study and protection as a means of analysing Maltese society.

== Office of the Chief Herald of Arms of Malta ==
In March 2019, the Office of the Chief Herald of Arms of Malta was established by Heritage Malta upon the Prime Minister's recommendation and the Cabinet Secretary at the Office of the Prime Minister.

On 25 June 2019, with notice number 729 in the Malta Government Gazette, the Government of Malta announced the appointment of a Chief Herald to the Office of the Chief Herald of Arms of Malta, based at the historic Fort St. Elmo in Valletta.

On 21 January 2022, the 2021 Heraldry and Genealogy regulations were published by the Government of Malta by virtue of a legal notice issued after an amendment to the Cultural Heritage Act unanimously approved by parliament and which received Presidential Assent on 20 July 2021.

The position of Chief Herald of Arms of Malta is presently held by Dr. Charles A. Gauci. He was originally appointed in 2019 and was confirmed in this appointment on 31 January 2022, by the then Minister of Culture, Dr. José Herrera. He is helped locally by a number of officers of Arms. Abroad, the interests of the Office of the Chief Herald of Arms of Malta are represented by Special Officers of Arms Extraordinary. Professor the Chevalier Horatio Caesar Roger Vella, advises Dr. Gauci on matters relating to Latin and Paleography..

In July 2021, the Ombudsman of Malta, Anthony C. Mifsud, made the following conclusion in the Report on Case No U 0059: "[...] it appears that the establishment of the Office of the Chief Herald may have been somewhat defective. The provisions found in the Cultural Heritage Act, do not appear to have been correctly followed. Moreover, the powers granted to the said office especially as far as granting of new arms is concerned, go beyond what is permitted by the said Act in its current guise." The situation was rectified by an amendment to the Act in 2021. Regulations placing the office on a firm statutory basis were gazetted in December 2021, and came into effect on 21 January 2022.

The chief herald has been the subject of controversy in regards to the recognition of foreign arms, and some say illegitimate titles.

== Coat of Arms of the Office of the Chief Herald ==
The Coat of Arms of the Office of the Chief Herald of Malta, as approved by the Cabinet of the Government of Malta on 3 June 2019

Heraldry has its own language, known as 'blazon,' originating in medieval France. In Malta, old blazons are usually in Italian.

The arms used by the Office of the Chief Herald of Arms of Malta were approved by the Malta Cabinet Office on 3 June 2019 (featured image).

The blazon describing the Arms of the Chief Herald of Arms of Malta consists of:

(i) The motto, 'Virtute et Constantia', alluding to a phrase that reverberates throughout Malta's history after it was used by Jean de Vallette in a dispatch to King Philip II of Spain when describing the victory of the Great Siege of Malta in 1565. It is incorporated in the Arms of the Office of the Chief Herald in deference to Malta's most senior Order, the National Order of Merit.

(ii) The blue disc (in heraldry called a hurt) represents the Mediterranean Sea surrounding the Maltese Islands. The golden edge of the hurt represents Malta's 'imperial and royal history' as part of the Kingdom of Aragon and subsequently of Spain, the Principality of Malta at the time of the Order of St. John of Jerusalem and the Kingdom of the Two Sicilies, the British Empire and lastly the time when Malta was an independent monarchy from 1964 until 1974.

Malta derives its heraldic heritage from the three main royal authorities which once ruled the Maltese islands and the finials on the Maces represent two of those sources;

(iii) The finial of one mace (the dexter or left, as you look at the Arms) represents Aragon. It bears the undifferentiated Arms of that kingdom. The Cross of Aragon surmounts the shield of Aragon.

(iv) The finial of the other mace (the sinister or right as you look at the Arms) represents the Principality and Fortress of Malta, the seat of the Order of St. John of Jerusalem, which defended Malta. The mural crown represents Fortress Malta.

The Arms bear a Crest Coronet. This is a "simple" crest and not a Coronet of rank. The crest coronet of the Chief Herald of Arms of Malta is composed simply of 14 oak leaves, devoid of any royal trappings.

Naturally, the eight-pointed cross – often commonly called the Maltese Cross, is closely associated with Malta's history. It also appears on the insignia of the Maltese National Order of Merit and is used in these Arms for its historical legacy and because the Order of Merit is Malta's highest institution of honour.

== National coat of arms ==
The coat of arms of Malta was created in the 20th century but has an older history.

The national coat of arms of Malta is described in detail in coat of arms of Malta

== Coats of arms of cities ==
Every city in Malta has its own coat of arms. Each has a mural crown with three or four turrets. The capital Valletta, and the former capital cities of Mdina and Birgu have four turrets, while the rest have three.

Valletta (Città Umilissima). Gules a lion Or langued and armed of the first.

Mdina (Città Notabile). Per pale Argent and Gules.

Birgu (Città Vittoriosa). Gules a hand couped proper clad Argent holding a sword erect Argent surrounded by a wreath Vert.

Isla/Senglea (Città Invicta). Or on a saltire Sable five scallops Argent.

Qormi (Città Pinto). Argent, five crescents in saltire Gules.

Rabat (Città Victoria). Azure a triple-mount Or on a chief of the same the letters VR Gules.

Siġġiewi (Città Ferdinand). Argent on a fess Gules a cross couped Or.

Żabbar (Città Hompesch). Gules a saltire engrailed Argent.

Żebbuġ (Città Rohan). Gules nine mascles Or.

Żejtun (Città Beland). Argent a cross Vert.

The villages also have similar coats of arms, but without the mural crown.

== See also ==
- Flag and coat of arms of the Sovereign Military Order of Malta
