= List of bus routes in Malta =

Various bus routes have been operated in Malta since the early 20th century. The system has evolved significantly over the years, with changes in routes, services, and operational management to meet the varying needs of passengers.

The bus network in Malta serves as the primary form of public transport, operating on the islands of Malta and Gozo. Managed by Malta Public Transport (MPT), the system includes over 110 routes that connect major towns, villages, tourist attractions, and key infrastructure such as Malta International Airport and ferry terminals.

No routes operate on Comino or on any other of the minor islands of Malta.

== Impact on transportation ==
The public bus system in Malta, commonly known as tal-linja (stylized as tallinja), serves all majorly inhabited areas across the country and is the primary mode of public transportation. Passengers can access the bus service using either a Tallinja card or paper tickets.

Since 1 October 2022, travel on public buses, including night services and special routes, is free for Tallinja card holders. However, this exemption does not apply to Tallinja Direct, Airport Direct, and Tallinja on Demand services. The introduction of the free travel initiative has led to a significant increase in bus ridership, with over 67.3 million and 75.8 million bus trips recorded in 2023 and 2024 respectively.

All scheduled public transport routes are operated by Malta Public Transport. This excludes sightseeing buses and vintage/heritage buses, which are independently operated and separate from the national bus network.

== Malta Public Transport routes (2015–current) ==
The operations of Malta Public Transport were taken over by Autobuses Urbanos de León (a subsidiary of ALSA) in January 2015. The pattern of routes was substantially changed when the new network took effect. As of August 2025, there are around 500 diesel-run buses servicing these routes, as well as 32 electric buses as of 2024. Frequencies are typically every 10–30 minutes during peak hours on week days, and longer on weekends and public holidays, when fewer buses are operated.

The bus fleet comprises modern low-emission vehicles, many of which are air-conditioned and wheelchair-accessible. MPT has continued efforts to reduce environmental impact, with investments in hybrid and electric buses. The main bus terminals are located in Valletta, Mater Dei Hospital, the airport, and Victoria.

Despite improvements, the bus system has faced criticism related to reliability, overcrowding during peak tourist seasons, and insufficient coverage in rural areas. Efforts are ongoing to improve punctuality, expand coverage, and enhance digital tracking through apps and live information displays.

=== Daytime routes in Malta ===
Route number	From	Via	To	Notes
1	Valletta	Blata l-Bajda, Marsa (Aldo Moro Road), Paola, Fgura, Cospicua (San Ġwann t'Għuxa)	Senglea	
2	Valletta	Blata l-Bajda, Marsa (Aldo Moro Road), Paola, Għajn Dwieli, San Ġwann t'Għuxa, Cospicua, Tal-Ħawli	Birgu (Centre)	
3	Valletta	Blata l-Bajda, Marsa (Aldo Moro Road), Paola, Għajn Dwieli, Cospicua, Birgu (Café Riche), Cospicua (Il-Fortini, Santa Liberata), Kalkara (Naval Cemetery, SmartCity, Fort Rinella, Bighi)	Kalkara	
4	Valletta	Blata l-Bajda, Marsa (Aldo Moro Road), Paola, Għajn Dwieli, San Ġwann t'Għuxa, Cospicua (Verdala area), Tal-Ħawli, Fortini, Birgu (Café Riche)	Birgu (Centre)	
13	Valletta	Pietà, Msida, Ta' Xbiex, Gżira, Sliema, Balluta Bay, St Julian's, Swieqi (St. Andrew's Road), Pembroke (Luxol)	Baħar iċ-Ċagħaq	
13A	Valletta	Pietà, Msida, Ta' Xbiex, Gżira, Sliema, Balluta Bay	St Julian's	Shorter version of the 13, terminating at St Julian's
14	Valletta	Pietà, Msida, Ta' Xbiex, Gżira, Sliema, Balluta Bay, St Julian's, Swieqi (St. Andrew's Road), Pembroke (P&R, Centre), St Julian's (Paceville), Sliema, Gżira, Ta' Xbiex, Msida, Pietà	Valletta	Circular route
15	Valletta	Pietà, Msida, Ta' Xbiex, Gżira	Sliema (Ferries)	
16	Valletta	Pietà, Msida, Gżira, Ta' Xbiex, Gżira, Sliema, St Julian's, Swieqi, Tal-Ibraġ	Madliena (Victoria Gardens)	
21	Valletta	Pietà, Msida, Gżira (Rue d'Argens), Savoy (Sliema), Dingli Circle, Qui-Si-Sana, Tigné Point	Sliema (Ferries)	
22	Valletta	Pietà, Msida, Gżira (Rue d'Argens), Sliema (Mrabat), St Julian's (Ta' Giorni, Mensija), San Ġwann (Misraħ Lewża, Ta' Żwejt, San Ġwann Industrial Estate), Mater Dei, University	Birkirkara (Santa Liena)	
24	Valletta	Pietà, Msida, Tal-Qroqq, University, San Ġwann (Kappara, Misraħ Lewża, Ta' Żwejt, San Ġwann Industrial Estate), Sliema (Mrabat), Gżira (Rue d'Argens), Tal-Qroqq (University), Msida, Pietà	Valletta	Circular route
25	Valletta	Pietà, Msida, Gżira (Rue d'Argens), Mrabat (Sliema), Kappara, San Ġwann (Misraħ Lewża, Ta' Żwejt, San Ġwann Industrial Estate), Mater Dei, University, Tal-Qroqq, Msida, Pietà	Valletta	Circular route
31/31A	Valletta	Pietà, Msida, Tal-Qroqq, University, Mater Dei, Birkirkara (Triq Dun Karm), Iklin, Naxxar, Mosta (Technopark, Centre, Constitution Street), Burmarrad	Buġibba	Route 31A, introduced on 23rd August 2026, is a northbound-only route that takes a more direct route into Buġibba.
32	Valletta	Pietà, Msida, Tal-Qroqq, Swatar (Tal-Qattus), Birkirkara (Ta' Paris), Mater Dei, University, Tal-Qroqq, Msida, Pietà, Floriana, Malta	Valletta	Circular route
35	Valletta	Pietà, Msida, Tal-Qroqq, Mater Dei, University, San Ġwann (San Ġwann Industrial Estate, Ta' Żwejt, Kappara), Sliema (Mrabat), Gżira (Rue d'Argens), Ta' Xbiex, Msida, Pietà	Valletta	Circular route
41	Valletta	Pietà, Msida, Birkirkara (Mannarinu Road), Lija (Ċimiterju), Mosta (Technopark, Centre, Constitution Street), Burmarrad, St. Paul's Bay, Xemxija, Mistra Bay, Mellieħa (Centre, Għadira, Marfa)	Ċirkewwa	
42	Valletta	Blata l-Bajda, Ħamrun (High Street), Santa Venera, Fleur-de-Lys, Birkirkara (Stazzjon), Lija (Ċimiterju), Mosta (Technopark, Centre, Constitution Street), Burmarrad, St. Paul's Bay, Xemxija, Mellieħa, (Centre, Għadira, Marfa)	Ċirkewwa	Equivalent to 41, but passes through Ħamrun High Street instead of Birkirkara Mannarinu Road
43	Valletta	Pietà, Msida, Birkirkara (Mannarinu Road), Iklin, Naxxar (Ta' Simblija/Higher Secondary School)	Naxxar (Centre)	
44	Valletta	Pietà, Msida, Birkirkara (Mannarinu Road), Lija (Ċimiterju), ll-Mosta (Technopark, Independence Avenue), Mġarr (Żebbiegħ, Centre, Ta' Mrejnu, Ballut)	Għajn Tuffieħa (Bajja tal-Mixquqa)	
45	Valletta	Pietà, Msida, Birkirkara (Mannarinu Road), Lija (Ċimiterju), Mosta (Technopark), Naxxar (Centre, Sgħajtar), Mosta (San Anton Abbati, Constitution Street), Burmarrad, Qawra	Buġibba	
46	Valletta	Pietà, Msida, Birkirkara (Mannarinu), Lija (Ċimiterju), Mosta (Technopark), Naxxar	Għargħur	
47	Valletta	Blata l-Bajda, Ħamrun (Mile End), Gwardamanġa (St. Luke's Hospital), Santa Venera (Old Railway Track), Birkirkara (Valley Road), Lija (Ċimiterju), Mosta (Technopark, Centre, San Anton Abbati, Santa Margerita, MCAST Mosta, Tarġa Gap, Ta' Żokkrija/Beżbiżija, Centre, Technopark), Lija (Ċimiterju), Birkirkara (Valley Road), Santa Venera (Old Railway Track), Gwardamanġa (St. Luke's Hospital), Ħamrun (Mile End), Blata l-Bajda	Valletta	Circular route
48	Valletta	Pietà, Msida, Birkirkara (Mannarinu Road), Lija (Ċimiterju), Mosta (Technopark, Centre, Constitution Street), Burmarrad, St. Paul's Bay (Tal-Gillieru)	Buġibba	
49	Valletta	Pietà, Msida, Birkirkara (Mannarinu Road), Lija (Ċimiterju), Mosta (Technopark), Naxxar (Centre, San Pawl tat-Tarġa, Birguma, T'Alla u Ommu, Salina, Kennedy Grove), St. Paul's Bay, Xemxija, Mellieħa (Centre, Għadira)	Armier	Terminates at Għadira in winter
50	Valletta	Pietà, Msida, Birkirkara (Mannarinu Road), Balzan (San Anton), Attard (Ħal Warda), Ta' Qali (Mdina Road), Rabat (Saqqajja), Mdina	Rabat (Santa Rita)	Operates at peak times between Mondays and Fridays only
51	Valletta	Blata l-Bajda, Ħamrun, Santa Venera, Fleur-de-Lys, Mrieħel, Attard (Ħal Warda), Ta' Qali (Mdina Road), Rabat (Tad-Dumnikani, Għar Barka, Nigret)	Mtarfa	
52	Valletta	Blata l-Bajda, Ħamrun, Santa Venera, Fleur-de-Lys, Mrieħel, Attard (Ħal Warda), Ta' Qali, Saqqajja, Rabat (Tad-Dumnikani)	Dingli (Football Ground)	
53	Valletta	Blata l-Bajda, Ħamrun, Santa Venera, Fleur-de-Lys, Mrieħel, Attard (Ħal Warda), Ta' Qali, Rabat (Saqqajja, Tad-Dumnikani, Tal-Virtù, Għar Barka, Nigret, L-Għeriexem)	Rabat (Bus Terminus)	
54	Valletta	Msida, Birkirkara (Mannarinu Road), Lija, Balzan, Attard (Centre, Misraħ Kola)	Attard (Tal-Mirakli/Tal-Fuklar)	
56	Valletta	Pietà, Msida, Birkirkara (Mannarinu Road), Balzan (San Anton), Attard (Ħal Warda), Ta' Qali (Mdina Road, Crafts Village, Football Ground), Rabat (Saqqajja, Nigret), Dingli	Buskett	
58	Valletta	Blata l-Bajda, Ħamrun, Santa Venera, Fleur-de-Lys, Birkirkara (Mannarinu Road)	Birkirkara (Stazzjon)	
58A	Valletta	Blata l-Bajda, Ħamrun, Gwardamanġa, Santa Venera (Old Railway Track), Birkirkara (Psaila Street)	Birkirkara (Stazzjon)	
61	Valletta	Blata l-Bajda, Ħamrun (Mile End), Marsa (P&R), Qormi (San Bastjan, Tal-Ħandaq, Ta' Paskarella), Żebbuġ (Sciortino, Ħal Muxi)	Żebbuġ (Kandlora)	
62	Valletta	Blata l-Bajda, Ħamrun (Mile End), Marsa (P&R), Qormi (Bypass), Żebbuġ (Bypass), Siġġiewi, Żebbuġ (Bypass), Qormi (Bypass), Marsa (P&R), Ħamrun (Mile End), Blata l-Bajda	Siġġiewi	Converted to a circular route in August 2025.
63	Valletta	Blata l-Bajda, Ħamrun (Mile End), Marsa (P&R), Qormi (San Ġorġ)	Qormi (Ta' Farsina)	
64	Valletta	Blata l-Bajda, Ħamrun (Mile End), Marsa (P&R), Qormi (Ċimiterju, Tal-Blat), Santa Venera (Cannon Road), Fleur-de-Lys, Mrieħel, Santa Venera (Cannon Road), Qormi (Tal-Blat, Ċimiterju), Ħamrun (Mile End), Blata l-Bajda	Santa Venera (Cannon Road)	Circular route. Extended to serve the western half of Qormi in May 2026.
71	Valletta	Blata l-Bajda, Marsa (Aldo Moro Road), Luqa, Airport, Kirkop, Safi, Żurrieq (Xarolla)	Żurrieq	
72	Valletta	Blata l-Bajda, Marsa (Aldo Moro Road), Luqa, Airport, Kirkop, Mqabba	Qrendi	
73	Valletta	Blata l-Bajda, Marsa (Aldo Moro Road), Luqa (L-Ingieret, Ħal Farruġ, Centre), Kirkop, Safi, Żurrieq (Bubaqra)	Żurrieq	
74	Valletta	Blata l-Bajda, Ħamrun, Marsa (P&R), Luqa (L-Ingieret, Ħal Farruġ), Siġġiewi (Montekristo Estates), Mqabba (Ta' Kanda, Centre), Qrendi (Centre, Maqluba, Ħaġar Qim), Żurrieq (Wied iż-Żurrieq)	Żurrieq	
80	Valletta	Blata l-Bajda, Marsa (Aldo Moro Road), Santa Luċija, Żejtun, Bir id-Deheb, Birżebbuġa (Għar Dalam)	Birżebbuġa (Pretty Bay)	
81	Valletta	Blata l-Bajda, Marsa (Aldo Moro Road), Paola, Tarxien, Żejtun (Bulebel, Ġebel San Martin), Bir id-Deheb	Marsaxlokk	
82	Valletta	Blata l-Bajda, Marsa (Aldo Moro Road), Paola, Tarxien, Tal-Barrani, Bir id-Deheb, Birżebbuġa (Għar Dalam, Sea Front)	Birżebbuġa (Tal-Papa)	
82A	Valletta	Blata l-Bajda, Marsa (Aldo Moro Road), Paola, Tarxien, Tal-Barrani, Bir id-Deheb, Birżebbuġa (Għar Dalam, Triq il-Port Ħieles)	Birżebbuġa (Tal-Papa)	
82B	Valletta	Blata l-Bajda, Marsa (Aldo Moro Road), Paola, Tarxien, Bir id-Deheb, Birżebbuġa (Centre, Ħal Far)	Birżebbuġa (Tal-Papa)	
83	Valletta	Blata l-Bajda, Marsa (Aldo Moro Road), Paola, Tarxien (Xintill), Santa Luċija, Paola, Marsa (Aldo Moro Road), Blata l-Bajda	Valletta	Converted to a circular route in August 2025.
84	Valletta	Blata l-Bajda, Marsa (Aldo Moro Road), Paola, Tarxien, Żejtun (Bulebel, Ġebel San Martin, Ta' Ganza, Ħal Tmiem, Ta' San Girgor), Bir id-Deheb	Żejtun	
85	Valletta	Blata l-Bajda, Marsa (Aldo Moro Road), Paola, Tarxien, Żejtun (Bulebel, Ġebel San Martin), Bir id-Deheb, Birżebbuġa (Għar Dalam, Il-Qajjenza)	Marsaxlokk	
88	Valletta	Blata l-Bajda, Marsa (Aldo Moro Road), Paola, Tarxien, Tal-Barrani, Bir id-Deheb, Għaxaq, Gudja	Luqa (Airport)	
90	Valletta	Blata l-Bajda, Marsa (Aldo Moro Road), Paola, Fgura	Żabbar	Used to operate at peak times between Mondays and Fridays only. Now operates from 5am to 6pm during weekdays.
91	Valletta	Blata l-Bajda, Marsa (Aldo Moro Road), Paola, Fgura, Żabbar, Marsaskala (Centre, San Tumas)	Marsaskala	
92	Valletta	Blata l-Bajda, Marsa (Aldo Moro Road), Paola, Fgura, Żabbar (Tal-Plier), Sant' Antnin, Marsaskala	Marsaskala (Żonqor)	
93	Valletta	Blata l-Bajda, Marsa (Aldo Moro Road), Paola, Fgura, Żabbar (Tal-Plier), Sant' Antnin, Marsaskala	Marsaskala (Jerma)	
94	Valletta	Blata l-Bajda, Marsa (Aldo Moro Road), Paola, Fgura, Żabbar, St. Peter's, SmartCity	Xgħajra	
95	Valletta	Floriana, Marsa, Paola, Fgura, Paola, Marsa, Floriana	Valletta	Circular route introduced on 17 May 2026.
101	Mġarr (Ġnejna Bay)	Mġarr (Ġnejna Bay, Tas-Santi, Centre, Żebbiegħ, Ta' Mrejnu, Għajn Tuffieħa, Bajja tal-Mixquqa, Manikata, Mellieħa (Ġnien Ingraw, Centre, Popeye Village, Għadira, Marfa)	Ċirkewwa	Starts from Mġarr centre instead of Ġnejna Bay in winter. Early morning/late evening trips skip the Popeye Village area.
103	Mosta (Bidnija)	Mosta (Constitution Street, Centre, Tal-Awrora, Sgħajtar), Naxxar (Centre, Nutar, Birguma, Baħar iċ-Ċagħaq), Tul il-Kosta	Pembroke (P&R)	No service on Sundays.
106	Mater Dei	University, Birkirkara (Bypass, Santa Liena, Naxxar Road), Balzan, Attard	Attard (Tal-Mirakli)	
109	Rabat (Baħrija)	Rabat (L-Għemieri, Tas-Salib, Għajn Qajjet, L-Għexierem, Saqqajja), Attard (Ħal Warda, Mrieħel), Żebbuġ, Siġġiewi (Centre, Tal-Providenza, Tal-Bajjada)	Siġġiewi (Għar Lapsi)	
109A	Rabat (Baħrija)	Rabat (Kunċizzjoni, Għajn Qajjet, L-Għexierem, Saqqajja), Attard (Ħal Warda, Mrieħel), Żebbuġ, Siġġiewi (Centre, Tal-Providenza, Tal-Bajjada)	Siġġiewi (Għar Lapsi)	Variant of the 109
110	Marsa (P&R)	Santa Venera (Cannon Road), Fleur-de-Lys, Birkirkara, Swatar, Mater Dei, San Ġwann (Industrial Estate, Centre, Mrabat), Sliema (Dingli Street, Tower Road), St Julian's	Pembroke (P&R)	
117	Mqabba	Qrendi, Żurrieq (Tal-Bebbux, Nigret, Centre, Bubaqra), Safi, Kirkop, Luqa (Airport, Centre, Ħal Farruġ, L-Ingieret), Marsa (P&R), University	Mater Dei	
119	Marsaskala	Marsaskala (San Tumas), Żejtun (Ħal Tmiem, Ta' San Girgor), Bir id-Deheb, Marsaxlokk, Birżebbuġa (Il-Qajjenza, Centre, Freeport, Ħal Far)	Airport	
120	Xgħajra	Żabbar (St. Peter's, Centre), Fgura, Paola, Marsa (Aldo Moro Road, P&R), University, Mater Dei, San Ġwann (Industrial Estate, Mensija), St Julian's (Ta' Giorni, Centre)	Pembroke (P&R)	Return via Pembroke (Centre), similar to Route 14
122	Valletta	Blata l-Bajda, Ħamrun (Mile End), Gwardamanġa, St. Luke's Hospital, Santa Venera, University	Mater Dei	
124	Senglea	Cospicua, Birgu (Café Riche, Fortini, Tal-Ħawli), Żabbar, Marsaskala (Żonqor, Centre, San Tumas)	Marsaskala (Bellavista)	
130	Valletta	Floriana (P&R), Marsa (Spencer Hill), Valletta (Cruise Terminal, Waterfront), Floriana (Boffa Hospital)	Valletta	Circular route
133	Valletta	Valletta (St. Paul Street, Republic Street, Marsamxett (Sliema Ferry Terminal), St. Elmo, Ta' Liesse (Gozo Fast Ferry Terminal), Floriana (Boffa Hospital, Polyclinic)	Valletta	Circular route serving central Valletta. Run by minivans due to the narrow streets in Valletta.
135	Marsaskala	Marsaskala (San Tumas), Żejtun (Ħal Tmiem, Ta' San Girgor), Bir id-Deheb, Għaxaq (Bypass), Gudja (Ta' Xlejli, Centre), Luqa (Airport, Centre, Ħal Farruġ, L-Ingieret), Marsa (P&R), University	Mater Dei	Extended to serve Gudja housing estate on 17 May 2026.
150	Valletta (Gozo Fast Ferry Terminal)	Non-stop	Paola (MCAST)	Direct bus for Gozo Fast Ferry commuters. Weekdays (Mon-Fri) only. Southbound morning only, northbound afternoon/evening only.
181	Dingli	Rabat (Tal-Virtù, Bus Terminus, Saqqajja), Ta' Qali, Attard (Ħal Warda, San Anton), Balzan, Birkirkara, Santa Venera (Psaila Street), University	Mater Dei	
182	Mtarfa	Rabat (Nigret, Għar Barka, Saqqajja, Bus Terminus), Ta' Qali, Attard (Ħal Warda, San Anton), Balzan, Birkirkara, Santa Venera (Psaila Street), Gwardamanġa, St. Luke's Hospital, Santa Venera (Psaila Street), University	Mater Dei	
186	Rabat	Rabat (Saqqajja), Ta' Qali, Attard (Tal-Mirakli, Triq Durumblat), Mosta (Ta' Mlit, Constitution Street), Burmarrad	Buġibba	
191	Marsaskala (Sant' Antnin)	Marsaskala (Bellavista, Żonqor, Centre, San Tumas)	Marsaskala (Sant' Antnin)	Circular route around Marsaskala added on 17 May 2026.
201	Rabat	Rabat (Saqqajja, Tad-Dumnikani), Dingli (Centre, Dingli Cliffs), Siġġiewi (Il-Fawwara, Il-Girgenti, Tal-Providenza, Tal-Bajjada), Żurrieq (Wied iż-Żurrieq, Centre), Kirkop (Valletta Road)	Airport	Does not go down to Wied iż-Żurrieq in Winter.
202	Rabat	Rabat (Saqqajja), Ta' Qali, Attard (Tal-Mirakli), Mosta (Technopark, Centre, Tal-Awrora), Naxxar (Sgħajtar, Centre), San Ġwann (Tal-Balal, Centre), Pembroke (P&R), St Julian's	Sliema (Ferries)	
203	Sliema (Ferries)	Gżira (Rue d'Argens), San Ġwann (Centre, Tal-Balal), Naxxar, Mosta (Technopark, Constitution Street), Burmarrad	Buġibba	
204	Marsaskala	Marsaskala (San Tumas, Centre, Sant' Antnin), Żabbar (Tal-Plier), Fgura, Paola, Marsa (Aldo Moro Road, P&R), University	Mater Dei	
205	Marsa (P&R)	Luqa (L-Ingieret, Ħal Farruġ, Airport), Birżebbuġa (Ħal Far)	Birżebbuġa	
206	Żejtun	Żejtun (Ta' Ganza, Ta' San Girgor), Bir id-Deheb, Żejtun (Ġebel San Martin), Tarxien, Paola, Marsa (Aldo Moro Road, P&R), University	Mater Dei	
207	Marsa (P&R)	University, Mater Dei, Birkirkara (Bypass, Santa Liena), Iklin, Naxxar (Nutar)	Naxxar (Ta' Simblija/Higher Secondary School)	New route introduced in April 2025. Operates two return journeys each way on Weekdays (Mon-Fri) only. The two journeys from Marsa depart in the morning, the return ones leave Naxxar in the afternoon. This route is temporarily suspended during the summer.
208	Luqa (Airport)	Luqa (Bypass, L-Ingieret), Marsa (P&R), Tal-Qroqq, University	Mater Dei	
209	Mater Dei	University, Santa Venera, Pietà, Ħamrun (High Street, Tar-Rabbat), Marsa (P&R), Qormi (Victory Street, San Bastjan, Ta' Paskarella), Żebbuġ, Siġġiewi (Ta' Ħesri)	Siġġiewi	
210	Mater Dei	University, Marsa (P&R, Aldo Moro Road), Paola, Tarxien, Bulebel, Żejtun (Ġebel San Martin, Centre), Bir id-Deheb, Marsaxlokk, Birżebbuġa (Il-Qajjenza, Centre)	Birżebbuġa (Tal-Papa)	
211	Paola (Kordin Industrial Estate)	Paola, Marsa (P&R), San Ġwann (Miller Bus Stop)	St Julian's	New direct route introduced in April 2025.
212	Sliema (Ferries)	St Julian's, Swieqi (St. Andrew's Road), Naxxar (Baħar iċ-Ċagħaq, Salina, Kennedy Grove)	Buġibba	
213	Senglea	Cospicua, Birgu (Café Riche, Fortini), Kalkara (Santa Liberata, Bighi, Centre), Birgu (Tal-Ħawli), Cospicua (Verdala, San Ġwann t'Għuxa), Paola (Għajn Dwieli, Centre), Marsa (Aldo Moro Road), Blata l-Bajda, Ħamrun (Mile End), Santa Venera, University	Mater Dei	
214	Buġibba	Qawra, Burmarrad, Mosta (Triq Missjunarji Maltin), Mtarfa (Bypass), Rabat, Ta’ Qali, Attard (Bypass), Balzan, Birkirkara, Santa Venera, Marsa (P&R), Paola, Santa Luċija	Luqa (Airport)	New route introduced in April 2025. Previously was Route X3.
218	Mqabba	Qrendi, Żurrieq (Tal-Bebbux, Centre, Xarolla), Safi, Kirkop, Luqa (Airport, Centre), Marsa (Aldo Moro Road, P&R), University	Mater Dei	
221	Ċirkewwa	Mellieħa (Marfa, Għadira, Centre), Xemxija, St. Paul's Bay	Buġibba	
222	Ċirkewwa	Mellieħa (Marfa, Għadira, Centre), Xemxija, St. Paul's Bay, Naxxar (Kennedy Grove, Salina, Baħar iċ-Ċagħaq), Pembroke (P&R), Swieqi (St. Andrew's Road), St Julian's	Sliema (Ferries)	
223	Buġibba	Qawra, St. Paul's Bay (Centre, L-Imbordin), Mġarr (Ballut, Għajn Tuffieħa)	Mġarr (Bajja tal-Mixquqa)	
225	Sliema (Ferries)	St Julian's, Swieqi (St. Andrew's Road), Naxxar (Baħar iċ-Ċagħaq, Salina, Kennedy Grove), St. Paul's Bay (Centre, L-Imbordin), Mġarr (Ballut, Għajn Tuffieħa)	Mġarr (Bajja tal-Mixquqa)	(Sometimes, the Route 15 Valletta-Ta' Xbiex-Sliema Ferries switches directly into 225)
226	Gudja	Għaxaq, Bir id-Deheb, Tal-Barrani, Santa Luċija, Marsa (Aldo Moro Road, P&R), University	Mater Dei	
233	Swieqi	Swieqi (Tal-Ibraġ, Madliena, Victoria Gardens), Pembroke (P&R), St Julian's, Sliema, Gżira, Ta' Xbiex, Msida, Tal-Qroqq, University	Mater Dei	
238	Mġarr	Mġarr (Żebbiegħ), Mosta (Ta' Żokkrija, Ta' Beżbiżija, Centre, Tal-Awrora), Naxxar, San Ġwann, Mater Dei, University, Tal-Qroqq, Msida, Pietà, Floriana	Valletta	Route terminates at Mater Dei Hospital on weekends.
250	Għadira Bay	Mellieħa (Marfa, Għadira, Centre), Xemxija, St. Paul's Bay, Burmarrad, Mosta (Tarġa Gap, Santa Margerita, Technopark), Lija (Ċimiterju), Birkirkara (Bypass), Mater Dei, University, Tal-Qroqq, Msida, Pietà	Valletta	
260	Għargħur	Naxxar (Birguma, San Pawl tat-Tarġa, Centre, Sgħajtar), Mosta (Santa Margarita, Tarġa Gap, Centre, Technopark), Lija (Ċimiterju), Birkirkara (Bypass), Mater Dei, University, Tal-Qroqq, Msida, Pietà	Valletta	
280	Buġibba	Qawra, Burmarrad, Mosta (Constitution Street, Centre, Technopark), Lija (Ċimiterju), Birkirkara (Valley Road), University	Mater Dei	
300	Mater Dei	University, Msida, Pietà	Valletta (Gozo Fast Ferry Terminal)	
401	Paola (Addolorata Cemetery Car Park)	Marsa (Aldo Moro Road), Paola (Centre), Tarxien (Centre)	Paola (Addolorata Cemetery Car Park)	Circular route around Paola introduced in July 2025
402	Paola (Addolorata Cemetery Car Park)	Marsa (Aldo Moro Road), University	Mater Dei	New route introduced in July 2025
403	Ta' Qali (P&R)	Mosta, Naxxar, University	Mater Dei	New route introduced in September 2025
404	Ta' Qali (P&R)	Rabat	Ta' Qali (P&R)	Circular route, new route introduced in September 2025
405	Ta' Qali (P&R)	Mosta	Ta' Qali (P&R)	Circular route, new route introduced in September 2025
406	Buġibba	Qawra, San Pawl il-Baħar (Mosta Road)	Buġibba	Circular route, new route introduced in May 2026
407	Żejtun	Żejtun (Ħal Bisbut, Ħal Ġwann, Ġebel San Martin, Ta' Ganza, Ħal Tmiem)	Żejtun	Circular route, new route introduced in September 2026
409	Marsa (P&R)	Qormi (Ħandaq Industrial Estate, San Ġorġ, San Bastjan)	Marsa (P&R)	Circular route, new route introduced in September 2026
410	Sliema (Ferries)	Sliema (counter-clockwise loop)	Sliema (Ferries)	Circular route, new route introduced in September 2026
X1A	Ċirkewwa	Mellieħa (Marfa, Għadira, Centre), Xemxija, St. Paul's Bay, Naxxar (Baħar iċ-Ċagħaq), Pembroke (P&R), Tal-Qroqq, University	Paola (MCAST)	Limited-stop route, intended for students commuting from the Gozo Ferry to University/MCAST. Weekdays (Mon-Fri) only. Southbound mornings only, northbound evenings only. This route is temporarily suspended during the summer.
X299	Ċirkewwa	Mellieħa (Bypass), Xemxija, Pembroke (P&R), Tal-Qroqq	Mater Dei	New limited-stop route introduced in April 2025. Weekdays (Mon-Fri) only. Southbound mornings only, northbound afternoon only.
X300	Ċirkewwa	Mellieħa (Marfa, Għadira, Centre), St. Paul's Bay, Baħar iċ-Ċagħaq, Pembroke, San Ġwann, University, Mater Dei, Msida, Floriana	Valletta	Limited-stop route. Previously operated during the morning and evening peaks only, as of April 2025 now runs throughout the day, with new route X299 providing additional journeys during peak hours.

=== Daytime routes in Gozo ===
The following routes are operated by MPT in Gozo.

Route number	From	Via	To	Notes
301	Victoria	Xewkija, Għajnsielem	Mġarr	
302	Victoria	Gozo General Hospital, MCAST (Gozo), Xewkija, Ta' Xħajma, Nadur, Ta' Binġemma	Xagħra (Ramla Bay)	May skip Ramla Bay on some of its trips in winter. Extended to serve Ta' Xħajma Park and Ride in May 2026.
303	Victoria	Xewkija Industrial Estate, Xewkija, Ta' Xħajma, Nadur, San Blas, Qala, Għajnsielem	Mġarr	Some journeys skip the San Blas area (previously these were labelled as 303A). Extended to serve Ta' Xħajma Park and Ride in May 2026.
305	Victoria	Taċ-Ċawla, Sannat, Ta' Ċenċ	Munxar	Return journey via the western side of Sannat as at May 2026.
306	Victoria	Fontana, Munxar	Munxar (Xlendi)	Return journey amended in May 2026.
307	Victoria	Ta' Żejta, Ta' Ħamet, Ġgantija Temples, Tal-Għejun, Għajn Ħosna	Xagħra	
308	Victoria	Ta' Pinu, Ta' Għammar, Il-Fanal	Għasri	
309	Victoria		Żebbuġ	
310	Victoria	Tal-Għattuq (Tal-Grazzja), Il-Ħarrax, Qbajjar, Xwejni (Xwieni Salt Pans)	Żebbuġ (Marsalforn)	Runs more frequently in summer.
311	Victoria	Ta' Dbieġi Crafts Village, Għarb, San Lawrenz	San Lawrenz (Dwejra)	
312	Victoria	Ta' Dbieġi Crafts Village, San Lawrenz, Birbuba, Santu Pietru	Għarb	
313	Victoria	Qasam San Ġorġ, Santa Luċija	Kerċem	
322	Mġarr	Nadur, Ta' Bin Ġemma, Ramla Bay, Għajn Ħosna, Xagħra, Il-Pergla	Żebbuġ (Marsalforn)	Runs more frequently in summer.
323	Victoria	Gozo General Hospital, Xewkija, MCAST Gozo, Taċ-Ċawla	Victoria	
330	Victoria	Fontana, Xlendi	Victoria	Runs every two hours between Victoria, Fontana and Xlendi.

=== Nighttime routes ===
Night bus services in Malta are operated by MPT and provide late-night public transportation across key urban and tourist areas. Initially introduced to cater to nightlife hotspots and workers with overnight shifts, these routes are especially popular among locals and tourists in areas such as Valletta, St Julian's, Sliema, and Buġibba.

Night routes are typically denoted with an "N" prefix (e.g. N11, N212, etc.). Services usually run from around 11:00 PM until 3:30 AM, depending on the route and demand. These buses offer a limited-stop service and follow slightly modified versions of their daytime counterparts to ensure faster journey times and improved coverage during off-peak hours.

As of early 2025, the night bus network includes several routes connecting major nightlife zones with residential areas and key transport interchanges.

Route	Origin	Via	Destination	Notes
N3	Valletta	Blata l-Bajda, Marsa (Aldo Moro Road), Paola, Għajn Dwieli, Cospicua, Birgu (Café Riche), Cospicua (Il-Fortini, Santa Liberata), Kalkara (Naval Cemetery, SmartCity, Fort Rinella, Bighi)	Kalkara	Same route as daytime Route 3. Currently runs until midnight.
N11	St Julian's	Swieqi, Pembroke (P&R), Madliena, Naxxar (Baħar iċ-Ċagħaq, Salina), Buġibba, Qawra, St. Paul's Bay, Xemxija, Mellieħa (Centre, Għadira, Marfa)	Ċirkewwa	Similar (but not identical) route to the daytime Route 221. Currently runs until 03:30.
N13	Valletta	Pietà, Msida, Ta' Xbiex, Gżira, Sliema, Balluta Bay, Spinola Bay	St Julian's	Same route as daytime Route 13. Currently runs until 01:30.
N48	Valletta	Pietà, Msida, Swatar, Ta' Paris, Birkirkara, Lija, Mosta, Burmarrad, St. Paul's Bay	Buġibba	Same route as daytime Route 48. Currently runs until midnight.
N52	Valletta	Blata l-Bajda, Ħamrun, Santa Venera, Fleur-de-Lys, Mrieħel, Attard (Ħal Warda), Ta' Qali, Saqqajja, Rabat (Tad-Dumnikani)	Dingli (Football Ground)	Same route as daytime Route 52. Currently runs until midnight.
N62	Valletta	Blata l-Bajda, Ħamrun, Marsa (P&R), Qormi (Bypass, Tal-Ħandaq, Ta' Paskarella), Żebbuġ (Sciortino, Bypass)	Siġġiewi	Same route as daytime Route 62. Currently runs until midnight.
N71	Valletta	Blata l-Bajda, Marsa (Aldo Moro Road), Luqa, Airport, Kirkop, Safi, Żurrieq (Xarolla)	Żurrieq	Same route as daytime Route 71. Currently runs until midnight.
N82	Valletta	Blata l-Bajda, Marsa (Aldo Moro Road), Paola, Tarxien, Żejtun, Bir id-Deheb	Birżebbuġa	Same route as daytime Route 82. Currently runs until midnight.
N91	Valletta	Marsa (Aldo Moro Road), Paola, Fgura, Żabbar	Marsaskala	Same route as daytime Route 91. Currently runs until midnight.
N120	Xgħajra	Żabbar (St. Peter's, Centre), Fgura, Paola, Marsa (Aldo Moro Road, P&R), University, Mater Dei, San Ġwann (Industrial Estate, Mensija), St Julian's (Ta' Giorni, Centre)	Pembroke P&R	Same route as daytime Route 120. Currently runs until midnight.
N212	Sliema (Ferries)	Balluta Bay, Spinola Bay, St Julian's, Swieqi, Pembroke (P&R), Madliena, Naxxar (Baħar iċ-Ċagħaq, Salina), St. Paul's Bay	Buġibba	Same route as daytime Route 212. Currently runs until midnight.
N301	Victoria	Xewkija, Għajnsielem	Mġarr	Same route as daytime Route 301. This is the only night bus route in Gozo. Currently runs until midnight.

=== Airport routes ===
Airport bus routes in Malta are operated by Malta Public Transport and connect Malta International Airport with various localities across the island. Following the 2015 takeover by Autobuses Urbanos de León, a subsidiary of ALSA, dedicated airport services were restructured and branded as "X" routes (e.g. X1, X2, X3, X4), offering limited-stop connections to major hubs including Valletta, Sliema, St Julian's, and Gozo via the Ċirkewwa ferry terminal. In April 2025, most of the X routes were discontinued or rebranded, and the newly introduced TD (Tallinja Direct) routes now facilitate connections to the airport instead. A number of the regular routes (particularly those going towards the southern part of the island) also stop at or near the airport. All airport routes operate seven days a week, with increased frequency during peak hours and the summer season to accommodate higher passenger volumes.

The following routes currently serve Malta International Airport: X1A, TD1, TD2, TD3, TD4, 71, 72, 73, 117, 119, 135, 201, 208, 214, 218.

==== Airport Direct routes ====
In October 2024, Malta Public Transport acquired 25 King Long interurban buses that were formerly used by Cyprus Public Transport and entered service in December 2024 for Airport Direct Routes on Routes TD2 and TD3. On 24 February 2025, Malta Public Transport added two new Airport Direct routes to its schedule, TD1 and TD4. TD2 and TD3 were formerly summer-only routes before demand became too high to have them only run in the summer. A new route TD5 was introduced on 27 July 2025, particularly in response to higher-than-expected demand on route TD1.

Route number	From	Via	To	Notes
TD1	Ċirkewwa	Mellieħa, Buġibba, Rabat, Żebbuġ	Airport	A limited-stop service from Ċirkewwa to the airport, stopping in Mellieħa, Buġibba/Qawra, Rabat, and Żebbuġ.
TD2	Airport	St Julian's, Pembroke	Airport	This circular route travels non-stop from the airport to St Julian's, making the return journey via Pembroke and Paceville.
TD3	Airport	Sliema, Gżira	Airport	This circular route travels non-stop from the airport to St Julian's, making the return journey via Sliema and Gżira.
TD4	Valletta	Valletta (Lascaris)	Airport	This route starts from the Valletta bus terminus and visits Valletta Lascaris (connection with the Gozo Fast Ferry) before proceeding directly to the airport.
TD5	Buġibba	Rabat, Żebbuġ	Airport	A limited-stop service from Buġibba to the airport, stopping at Qawra, Rabat, and Żebbuġ. This is equivalent to the latter segment of route TD1.

=== Other Tallinja Direct routes ===
Route number	From	Via	To	Notes
TD10	Valletta	Marsaxlokk Sea Front	Marsaxlokk	No stops between Valletta and Marsaxlokk, a few stops along the Marsaxlokk sea front. Return journey via Qajjenza/western side of Marsaxlokk. Sundays only.
TD13	Valletta	Bombi, Msida Sea Front, St Julian's, Pembroke (P&R), Naxxar (Baħar iċ-Ċagħaq, Salina), Buġibba, Qawra	Buġibba	Less stops compared to the regular Route 13, and terminates at the Buġibba Bus Terminal instead of at Baħar iċ-Ċagħaq.

==== Tallinja On Demand ====
The Tallinja On Demand service uses minivans and acts as an on-demand service which can be booked via the official Malta Public Transport mobile application. Users can request a pick-up and drop-off at designated bus stops. It was introduced as TD Plus in 2019 and later renamed sometime in 2022. Initially, the service was available in the north eastern area of Malta (including St Julian's, Sliema, Gżira, Swieqi, San Ġwann, Valletta, and part of Birkirkara) and this was later extended to include Mrieħel as well. However, in February 2025, it was announced that the service will be limited to only the St Julian's and Sliema areas and will be available only on Friday and Saturday nights.

=== Special services ===
Special (one-off) services are often organised by Malta Public Transport following major events such as festivals and concerts. The exact routes and times are often announced a few days before the event, and depend on the event itself and user demand, but the routes are generally similar to the regularly-serviced routes, or multiple bus routes would be grouped into one longer route. Additionally, extra trips of the 'usual' bus routes are regularly organised. Examples of routes organised include as follows:

==== Routes departing from Valletta ====
These are organised following major events/concerts in Valletta or nearby Floriana. The list below is indicative, since routes are announced depending on demand for the specific event. Usually, additional services on the regularly-serviced bus routes are also organised.

Route number	From	Via	To	Notes
S10	Valletta	Paola, Senglea, Cospicua	Kalkara	
S12	Valletta	St Julian's, Pembroke, Baħar iċ-Ċagħaq, Qawra	Buġibba	
S13	Valletta	Gżira, Msida, St Julian's	Sliema	
S20	Valletta	Tal-Qroqq (University), San Ġwann	Għargħur	
S40	Valletta	Msida, Birkirkara, Lija, Balzan, Mosta	Mġarr	
S41	Valletta	Coast Road, St. Paul's Bay, Mellieħa	Ċirkewwa	
S42	Valletta	Msida, Birkirkara	Mosta (Żokrija)	
S47	Valletta	Birkirkara, Lija, Iklin, Naxxar	Mosta (Santa Margerita)	
S51	Valletta	Fleur-de-Lys, Rabat	Mtarfa	
S52	Valletta	Fleur-de-Lys, Rabat	Dingli	
S61	Valletta	Ħamrun, Qormi	Żebbuġ	
S62	Valletta	Ħamrun	Siġġiewi	
S71	Valletta	Luqa, Kirkop, Safi	Żurrieq	
S72	Valletta	Kirkop, Mqabba	Qrendi	
S80	Valletta	Marsa, Santa Luċija, Gudja, Għaxaq	Birżebbuġa	
S85	Valletta	Tarxien, Bulebel, Żejtun, Bir id-Deheb	Birżebbuġa (Centre)	
S90	Valletta	Paola, Fgura	Marsaskala	
S94	Valletta	Paola, Fgura, Żabbar	Xgħajra	

==== Routes departing from Ta' Qali ====
These are organised for events (e.g. Earth Garden Festival) occurring in Ta' Qali.

Route	Origin	Via	Destination	Notes
TQ1 (Northern Route)	Ta' Qali	Rabat, Mosta, Naxxar, St. Paul's Bay, Qawra	Buġibba	
TQ2 (Central Route)	Ta' Qali	Lija, Birkirkara (Bypass), San Ġwann, St Julian's, Sliema	Valletta	
TQ3 (Southeast Route)	Ta' Qali	Attard, Balzan, Birkirkara, Ħamrun, Paola, Three Cities (Cottonera), Żabbar, Fgura, Tarxien, Żejtun	Birżebbuġa	
TQ4 (Southwest Route)	Ta' Qali	Żebbuġ, Qormi, Marsa (P&R), Luqa, Kirkop, Safi	Żurrieq	
Additional services	-	Routes 56, 186, 202, 403	-	
Additional stop	-	Routes 51, 52, 53, X3, 181, 182	-	An additional stop added to the usual route.

==== Routes departing from Nadur ====
In February 2025, special services were organised for the first time following the Nadur Carnival. The following routes were organised:

Route	Origin	Via	Destination	Notes
S1	Nadur	Xagħra	Żebbuġ (Marsalforn)	
S2	Nadur	Xewkija, Sannat (Ta' Ċenċ), Munxar (Centre)	Munxar (Xlendi)	
S3	Nadur	Victoria, Kerċem	Santa Luċija	
S4	Nadur	Victoria, San Lawrenz, Għarb, Għasri	Żebbuġ	
S5	Nadur	Għajnsielem	Mġarr	
S6	Nadur	-	Qala	
Direct Shuttle Service	Victoria	-	Nadur	

In February 2026, a similar set of routes was organised during the carnival weekend. These were re-branded as routes 801-806.

==== Other special services ====
Special services other than the ones mentioned above were organised for other events, for example during Festa Frawli in Mġarr and for the San Girgor feast in Marsaxlokk.

=== Suspended and retired routes ===
The following routes were operated or proposed by MPT but are currently not in use.

Route	Origin	Via	Destination	Status
X1	Airport	Luqa, Ħal Farruġ, Qormi (Triq Manwel Dimech), Marsa (P&R), Mater Dei, University, Tal-Qroqq, Swieqi (St. Andrew's Road), Pembroke (P&R), Naxxar (Baħar iċ-Ċagħaq, Salina, Kennedy Grove), Xemxija, Mellieħa (Centre, Għadira, Marfa)	Ċirkewwa	Discontinued in April 2025, replaced by routes X300, X299, 208, and TD1.
X2	Airport	Luqa (Council of Europe Street), Santa Luċija (Luqa Road), Tarxien (Xintill), Paola, Marsa (Aldo Moro Road, P&R), Mater Dei, University, Tal-Qroqq, Swieqi (St. Andrew's Road)	Pembroke (P&R)	Discontinued in April 2025, replaced by routes 211, 110, 233, 88, TD2, and TD3.
X3	Airport	Luqa (Council of Europe Street), Santa Luċija (Luqa Road), Tarxien (Xintill), Paola, Marsa (Aldo Moro Road, P&R), Birkirkara (Mannarinu), Balzan, Attard (San Anton, Ħal Warda), Ta' Qali, Rabat (Saqqajja, Bus Terminus, L-Għeriexem), Mtarfa (Bypass), Mosta (Ta' Żokkrija, Tarġa Gap), Burmarrad	Buġibba	Renamed to Route 214 in April 2025.
X4	Valletta	Blata l-Bajda, Ħamrun, Marsa (P&R), Qormi (Manwel Dimech Street), Ħal Farruġ, Luqa, Airport, Birżebbuġa (Ħal Far, Freeport)	Birżebbuġa	Discontinued in April 2025, replaced by routes 205, 88, 82B, and TD4.
X4A	Valletta	Blata l-Bajda, Marsa (P&R), L-Ingieret, Ħal Farruġ, Luqa	Airport	Currently unused
X5	Valletta	Blata l-Bajda, Marsa (P&R), L-Ingieret, Ħal Farruġ, Luqa (Centre, Airport), Għaxaq, Bir id-Deheb, Żejtun (Ta' San Girgor, Ħal Tmiem), Marsaskala (Mamo Tower, San Tumas)	Marsaskala	Currently unused
X7	Valletta	Blata l-Bajda, Marsa (P&R), Luqa (L-Ingieret, Ħal Farruġ, Centre, Airport), Gudja, Għaxaq, Bir id-Deheb, Żejtun (Tal-Barrani), Paola (Centre, MCAST, Għajn Dwieli), Cospicua	Birgu	Currently unused
N10	Marsa (Aldo Moro Road), Paola, Fgura, Żabbar, Marsaskala, Żejtun, Tarxien, Luqa (Airport), Kirkop, Żurrieq, Qrendi, Mqabba, Ta' Kandja, Qormi (San Bastjan)	St Julian's	Circular route, discontinued in 2018	Currently unused
N12	Birkirkara (Psaila Street), Santa Venera, Qormi (San Ġorġ), Attard, Rabat (Bus Terminus), Mosta, Naxxar, San Ġwann	St Julian's	Circular route, discontinued in 2018	
N21	Kappara, San Ġwann (Centre, Tal-Balal, Xwieki), Għargħur, Naxxar, Mosta (Technopark, Centre, Technopark), Lija, Birkirkara, Tal-Qroqq	St Julian's	Circular route, currently unused	
N31	Swieqi, Pembroke, Madliena, Naxxar (Baħar iċ-Ċagħaq, Salina), Burmarrad, Mosta (Constitution Street, Centre), Naxxar (Centre)	St Julian's	Circular route, currently unused	
N32	Tal-Qroqq, Birkirkara, Lija, Mosta (Technopark, Centre), Naxxar, Għargħur, San Ġwann	St Julian's	Circular route, currently unused	
N50	Birkirkara (Centre), Balzan, Attard, Rabat	St Julian's	Circular route, currently unused	
N52	Birkirkara, Fleur-de-Lys, Mrieħel, Balzan, Attard, Ta' Qali, Rabat	St Julian's	Circular route, currently unused	
N61	Msida, Pietà, Blata l-Bajda, Ħamrun (Mile End), Santa Venera, Birkirkara, Żebbuġ, Siġġiewi, Qormi, Marsa (P&R)	St Julian's	Circular route, currently unused	
N71	Paola, Santa Luċija, Luqa, (Centre, Airport), Kirkop, Safi, Żurrieq, Qrendi, Mqabba, Kirkop (Bypass), Luqa (Airport, Centre), Paola	St Julian's	Circular route, currently unused	
N81	Paola, Tarxien, Żejtun, Bir id-Deheb, Għaxaq, Gudja	St Julian's	Circular route, currently unused	
TD8	Ċirkewwa	-	Valletta	Similar to route X300. Proposed but never operated
TD9	Buġibba	-	Valletta	Similar to route TD13. Proposed but never operated
TD11	Buġibba	St Julian's, Sliema, Msida (Sea Front), Marsa, Marsaxlokk	Birżebbuġa (Il-Qajjenza)	Proposed but never operated
TD12	Sliema (Ferries)	St Julian's, San Ġwann, Naxxar	Mosta	Proposed but never operated
TD14	Rabat (Bus Terminus)	St Julian's	Sliema	Returns via Sliema sea front. Proposed but never operated
TD17	Pembroke (P&R)	-	Msida (University)	Proposed but never operated
TD30	Mġarr	-	Xlendi	Direct route skipping Rabat (Victoria)
TD31	Mġarr	-	Marsalforn	Direct route skipping Rabat (Victoria)
121	Pembroke (P&R)	St Julian's, San Ġwann (Centre, Industrial Estate), University, Marsa (P&R, Aldo Moro Road), Paola, Fgura, Żabbar (Centre, St. Peter's), SmartCity	Xgħajra	Similar (but not identical) route to the daytime Route 120. Currently runs until 22:30. Replaced by route N120 in April 2026.

== Historical routes ==
=== Pre-Arriva routes ===
These routes operated prior to the introduction of the Arriva network on 3 July 2011 and are therefore no longer current.

In 2005, the Halcrow Group had been commissioned to assess the Malta bus system. Released in November 2005, the report criticised the existing bus service and routes, which had produced a very low utilization of buses. In fact, a decline of 50% in the number of bus passengers was registered between 1979 and 2009.

==== Routes in Malta ====
Route number	From	Via	To	Notes
1	Valletta	Marsa, Paola, Cospicua (Verdala)	Birgu	May have run via Tal-Ħawli.
3	Valletta	Marsa, Paola, Birgu	Senglea	May have run via Fgura. May have run via Birgu and Fgura towards Valletta.
4	Valletta	Marsa, Paola, Cospicua, Birgu	Kalkara	May have run via Rinella towards Kalkara.
5	Valletta	Marsa	Paola (Kordin Industrial Estate)	
6	Valletta	Marsa, Paola, Cospicua	Birgu	
8	Valletta	Marsa, Paola, Tarxien, Bir id-Deheb	Luqa (Airport)	Ran via Gudja towards Malta International Airport. May have run via Għaxaq towards Valletta.
10	Birżebbuġa	Għar Dalam, Bir id-Deheb, Tarxien, Paola, Marsa	Valletta	One-way only
11	Valletta	Marsa, Tarxien, Bir id-Deheb, Għar Dalam	Birżebbuġa	Ran via Paola towards Birżebbuġa. Also ran from Paceville.
12	Valletta	Marsa, Paola, Tarxien, Bir id-Deheb, Għar Dalam, Birżebbuġa (Centre, Tal-Papa)	Birżebbuġa	One-way only
13	Valletta	Marsa, Tarxien, Bir id-Deheb, Għar Dalam, Birżebbuġa (Centre, Il-Qajjenza)	Birżebbuġa (Ħal Far Industrial Estate)	Ran via Paola towards Ħal Far. Ran via Ħal Far Industrial Estate towards Valletta.
15	Valletta	Marsa, Paola	Santa Luċija	
16	Valletta	Marsa	Paola (secondary schools)	One-way only
17	Valletta	Marsa, Paola, Fgura, Żabbar, Marsaskala (Żonqor)	Marsaskala (Centre)	One-way only Enters centre of Marsaskala.
18	Valletta	Marsa, Paola, Fgura	Żabbar	Also ran from Paceville.
19	Valletta	Marsa, Paola, Fgura, Żabbar, Marsaskala	Marsaskala (San Tumas)	
20	Valletta	Marsa, Paola, Fgura, Marsaskala	Marsaskala (San Tumas)	Also ran from Paceville.
21	Valletta	Marsa, Paola, Fgura, Żabbar	Xgħajra	
22	Senglea	Cospicua, Birgu, Żabbar	Marsaskala	
26	Żejtun	Tarxien, Marsa	Valletta	One-way only
27	Valletta	Marsa, Paola, Tarxien, Żejtun, Bir id-Deheb	Marsaxlokk	Ran via Bulebel towards Valletta.
29	Valletta	Marsa, Paola, Tarxien, Bulebel	Żejtun	Enters centre of Żejtun. Also ran from Paceville.
30	Valletta	Marsa, Paola, Tarxien, Bulebel, Żejtun	Marsaskala (San Tumas)	
32	Valletta	Marsa, Luqa	Żurrieq	May have run via Safi, Kirkop, Zebbiegħ and Vjal Xarolla.
33	Valletta	Marsa, Luqa, Safi	Żurrieq	One-way only ran via Marsa Industrial Estate and/or AFM Barracks, if passengers request. Ran via Karwija, if not requested to run via AFM Barracks.
34	Valletta	Marsa, Kirkop, Safi, Żurrieq (Misraħ ir-Repubblika)	Żurrieq	Either ran via L-Ingieret or Luqa. May have run via Nigret. May have run via Airport towards Valletta. Also ran from Paceville.
35	Valletta	Marsa, Luqa (L-Ingieret), Mqabba	Qrendi	Ran via Luqa towards Valletta.
36	Luqa	Luqa (L-Ingieret), Marsa	Valletta	One-way only
38	Valletta	Marsa, Luqa, Żurrieq, Wied iż-Żurrieq, Ħaġar Qim	Qrendi	One-way only. May haved returned to Valletta via Route 35.
39	Valletta	Marsa, Luqa (L-Ingieret)	Luqa	One-way only. Returned as Route 36.
40	Valletta	Msida, Birkirkara, Balzan	Attard	Also ran from Paceville.
41	Valletta	Msida, San Ġwann, Gżira	San Ġwann (Ta' Żwejt)	Ran via Kappara Hill towards Ta' Żwejt. Ran via San Ġwann and Gżira towards Valletta.
42	Valletta	Msida, Gżira, San Ġwann (Ta' Żwejt)	Birkirkara (Santa Liena)	May have run via Mater Dei and University towards Birkirkara.
43	Valletta	Msida, Birkirkara, Mosta (Constitution Street), St. Paul's Bay	Mellieħa	Also ran from Paceville.
44	Valletta	Msida, Birkirkara, Mosta (Constitution Street), St. Paul's Bay, Mellieħa, Għadira	Mellieħa (Mellieħa Bay Hotel)	May serve Popeye Village as Route 441.
45	Valletta	Msida, Birkirkara, Mosta (Constitution Street), St. Paul's Bay, Mellieħa, Għadira	Ċirkewwa	Also ran from Paceville.
46	Mġarr	Mosta, Birkirkara, Msida	Valletta	One-way only
47	Valletta	Msida, Birkirkara, Mosta, Mġarr	Mġarr (Għajn Tuffieħa)	Ran via Tarġa Gap and Ta' Żokkrija towards Għajn Tuffieħa. May have run via Manikata towards Għajn Tuffieħa. May have run via Ta' Zokkrija and Tarġa Gap towards Valletta.
48	Buġibba	St. Paul's Bay, Mellieħa, Għadira	Ċirkewwa	
49	Valletta	Msida, Birkirkara, Mosta (Constitution Street), St. Paul's Bay	Buġibba	Also ran from Paceville. Ran from Paceville serve locations from Buġibba to Tarġa Gap in opposite order only.
50	Valletta	Msida, Birkirkara, Mosta (Constitution Street), St. Paul's Bay, Mellieħa, Għadira	Armier	May serve Popeye Village as Route 441.
52	Valletta	Msida, Birkirkara, Mosta (Constitution Street), St. Paul's Bay, Manikata, Għajn Tuffieħa, Mġarr, Mosta, Birkirkara, Msida	Valletta	One-way only
53	Valletta	Msida, Birkirkara, Mosta	Tarġa Gap	Also ran from Paceville to Tarġa Gap.
54	Valletta	Msida, Birkirkara	Naxxar (schools)	May show 45, 49 or 55 instead.
55	Valletta	Msida, Birkirkara, Naxxar	Għargħur	
56	Valletta	Msida, Birkirkara, Mosta, Naxxar	Għargħur	
57	Valletta	Msida, Birkirkara, Mosta, Santa Margerita	Ran from Valletta to Tarġa Gap. Ran from Buġibba or Tarġa Gap to Valletta.	
58	Valletta	Msida, Mosta (Constitution Street), St. Paul's Bay	Buġibba	Ran via Mater Dei and University towards Valletta. May have run via Iklin or Lija towards Valletta.
59	Valletta	Msida, Birkirkara, Il-Naxxar, Mosta (Constitution Street), Qawra	Buġibba	
60	Valletta	Msida	Sliema (Savoy)	
61	Sliema (Ferries)	Msida	Valletta	Possibly was one-way only
62	Valletta	Msida, Sliema (Ferries)	Paceville	
63	Valletta	Msida, Sliema (Savoy), Sliema (Ferries), Ta' Xbiex, Msida	Valletta	One-way only
64	Valletta	Msida, Sliema (Ferries), St Julian's, Paceville	Swieqi	Ran via St. Andrew's towards Valletta.
65	Sliema Ferries	St Julian's, Paceville, San Ġwann (Centre, Ta' Żwejt), Naxxar, Mosta, Ta' Qali	Rabat	May have run via Ta' Qali Stadium and Ta' Qali Crafts Village towards Rabat.
66	Valletta	Msida, Sliema (Ferries), St Julian's	Pembroke	Ran via Paceville towards Pembroke. Ran via St. George's Bay towards Valletta.
67	Valletta	Msida, Sliema (Ferries), St Julian's, Paceville	Pembroke (St. Andrew's)	Also ran from various places to Paceville.
68	Valletta	Msida, Sliema (Ferries), St Julian's, Paceville, Pembroke (St. Andrew's)	Naxxar (Baħar iċ-Ċagħaq)	
69	Valletta	Msida	University	One-way only
70	Sliema Ferries	St Julian's, Paceville, Pembroke (St. Andrew's), Naxxar (Baħar iċ-Ċagħaq)	Buġibba	Ran via Qawra towards Sliema.
71	Valletta	Ħamrun, Santa Venera, Fleur-de-Lys	Birkirkara (Stazzjon)	
73	Valletta	Ħamrun, Birkirkara (Psaila Street, Centre)	Lija	May have run via Mater Dei.
74	Valletta	Ħamrun, Birkirkara (Psaila Street, Centre)	Balzan	May have run via Mater Dei.
75	Valletta	Ħamrun, St. Luke's Hospital, Msida	Mater Dei	Also detours of various routes towards Valletta to St. Luke's Hospital and/or Mater Dei.
78	Birkirkara	Birkirkara (Psaila Street), Ħamrun	Valletta	One-way only
80	Valletta	Ħamrun, Santa Venera, Attard	Rabat	Enters centre of Rabat.
81	Valletta	Ħamrun, Santa Venera, Attard, Rabat	Dingli	May have run via Buskett Gardens and/or Dingli Cliffs towards Dingli. Also ran from Paceville. Ran from Paceville may continue back to Rabat.
82	Valletta	Ħamrun, Santa Venera, Attard, Rabat	Rabat (Għar Barka)	
84	Valletta	Ħamrun, Santa Venera, Attard, Rabat	Mtarfa	May enter the centre of Rabat.
85	Rabat		Rabat (Baħrija)	
86	Buġibba	St. Paul's Bay	Rabat	Ran via Tarġa Gap, Mosta and Ta' Qali towards Rabat. May have run via Ta' Qali, Mosta and Tarġa Gap towards Buġibba.
87	Valletta	Ħamrun, Qormi (Centre)	Żebbuġ	One-way only
88	Valletta	Ħamrun, Qormi (Centre)	Żebbuġ	Also ran from Paceville. Ran from Paceville continue to Siġġiewi.
89	Valletta	Ħamrun	Siġġiewi	
91	Valletta	Ħamrun, Qormi	Qormi (San Ġorġ)	Enters centre of Qormi. Ran via either Triq il-Kbira or Triq Valletta towards Valletta.
94	Siġġiewi		Siġġiewi (Għar Lapsi)	
98	Ran clockwise around Valletta.			
110	Birżebbuġa	Għar Dalam, Marsaxlokk, Bir id-Deheb, Żejtun, Paola, Marsa, Ħamrun, Msida	University	Ran via Santa Luċija or Tarxien. Ran via Mater Dei towards University. May have run via St. Luke's Hospital.
113	Valletta	Marsa, Tarxien, Bir id-Deheb, Għar Dalam, Birżebbuġa	Birżebbuġa (Ħal Far)	Ran via Paola towards Ħal Far.
115	Valletta	Marsa, Paola, Santa Luċija, Bir id-Deheb, Għar Dalam	Birżebbuġa	
118	Paceville	Marsa, Paola, Fgura	Żabbar	One-way only
127	Valletta	Marsa, Paola, Tarxien, Żejtun, Bir id-Deheb	Marsaxlokk	Ran via Għar Dalam and Il-Qajjenza towards Marsaxlokk.
132	Valletta	Marsa	Żurrieq	Express.
134	Paceville	Marsa, Kirkop, Safi, Żurrieq (Misraħ Ir-Repubblika)	Żurrieq	One-way only. Ran via either L-Ingieret or Luqa. May have run via Nigret.
138	Valletta	Marsa, L-Ingieret, Mqabba, Qrendi, Ħaġar Qim, Wied iż-Żurrieq	Żurrieq	One-way only
141	Valletta	Msida, Gżira, San Ġwann	San Ġwann (Ta' Żwejt)	
142	Valletta	Msida, Gżira, San Ġwann (Centre, Ta' Żwejt)	Birkirkara	May have run via Sliema (Savoy and Ferries) towards Valletta.
145	Valletta	Msida, Mosta (Constitution Street), St. Paul's Bay, Mellieħa, Għadira	Ċirkewwa	
153	Valletta	Msida, Mosta (Rotunda)	Mosta (Tarġa Gap)	Express.
154	Naxxar local service. May serve Naxxar primary school.			
157	Valletta	Birkirkara (Psaila Street), Mosta	Mosta (Santa Margerita)	
158	Valletta	Msida, Mosta	Mosta (Tarġa Gap)	One-way only
159	Valletta	Birkirkara (Psaila Street), Naxxar, Mosta (Constitution Street), Qawra	Buġibba	
165	Sliema Ferries	St Julian's, Paceville, San Ġwann	San Ġwann (Ta' Żwejt)	
166	Valletta	Msida, Sliema (Ferries), St Julian's	Pembroke (Institute of Tourism Studies)	Ran via Paceville towards Pembroke (Institute of Tourism Studies). Ran via St. George's Bay towards Valletta.
167	Ċirkewwa	Għadira, Mellieħa, St. Paul's Bay, Buġibba, Naxxar (Baħar iċ-Ċagħaq), Pembroke (St. Andrew's)	Paceville	
169	Valletta	Msida, Swatar (Valley Road), Mater Dei	University	
175	Detours of various routes towards Valletta to Junior College, Mater Dei and St. Luke's Hospital.			
198	Ran counter-clockwise around Valletta. Served Valletta Waterfront.			
245	Mellieħa	St. Paul's Bay, Mosta (Constitution Street), Naxxar, Birkirkara, Msida	Valletta	One-way only
300	see note	Żabbar, Fgura, Paola, Marsa, Ħamrun, St. Luke's Hospital, Msida	University	Ran from Marsaskala or Senglea via Cospicua and Birgu to University via Mater Dei. Ran from University to Senglea via Birgu and Cospicua. May have run via Kalkara.
350	Mqabba	Qrendi, Żurrieq, Kirkop, Luqa, Imgieret, Marsa, Ħamrun, Msida	University	Ran via Mater Dei towards University. May have run via St. Luke's Hospital.
367	Żurrieq	Safi, Kirkop, Luqa, Marsa, Sliema (Ferries), St Julian's, Paceville	Pembroke (St. Andrew's)	One-way only
400	Valletta	Marsa, Paola, Tarxien	Bulebel	One-way only
427	Buġibba	Mosta (Constitution Street), Attard, Marsa, Tarxien, Bir id-Deheb	Marsaxlokk	
441	Għadira		Popeye Village	
449	Buġibba		Valletta	One-way only. Express.
450	Ċirkewwa	Għadira, Mellieħa, St. Paul's Bay, Mosta (Constitution Street)	University	Ran via Mater Dei towards University.
475	Ċirkewwa	Mellieħa, Mosta, St. Luke's Hospital	Valletta	One-way only. Express. Only for passengers from Ċirkewwa.
499	Buġibba	Tarġa Gap, Mosta, Birkirkara, Msida	Valletta	One-way only
560	see note	Mosta	University	Ran from Għargħur to University via Naxxar and Mater Dei. Ran from University to Naxxar.
580	Buġibba	Mosta (Constitution Street), Birkirkara	University	Ran via Mater Dei towards University.
627	Buġibba	Naxxar (Baħar iċ-Ċagħaq), St. Andrew's, Paceville, St Julian's, Sliema (Ferries), Marsa, Paola, Bir id-Deheb	Marsaxlokk	Ran via Cospicua, Birgu, Żabbar and Bulebel towards Marsaxlokk. Ran via Tarxien towards Buġibba.
645	Sliema (Ferries)	St Julian's, Paceville, Pembroke (St. Andrew's), Naxxar (Baħar iċ-Ċagħaq), St. Paul's Bay, Mellieħa, Għadira	Ċirkewwa	
652	Sliema (Ferries)	St Julian's, Paceville, St. Andrew's, Naxxar (Baħar iċ-Ċagħaq), Buġibba, St. Paul's Bay	Mġarr (Għajn Tuffieħa)	
662	Valletta	Msida	Paceville	
667	Valletta	Msida, St Julian's, Paceville	Pembroke (St. Andrew's)	May have run via Sliema Ferries and Gżira towards Valletta. A large quantity of buses operated this route on weekend nights.
671	Valletta	Msida, Sliema (Ferries), St Julian's, Paceville, St. George's Bay, Pembroke	Pembroke (St. Andrew's)	One-way only
675	Pembroke (St. Andrew's)	Paceville, St Julian's, Sliema (Ferries), Gżira, Mater Dei	University	One-way only
800	Gudja	Bir id-Deheb, Żejtun, Santa Luċija, Paola, Marsa, Ħamrun, Msida	University	Ran via Għaxaq and Mater Dei towards University. Ran via St. Luke's Hospital towards Gudja. May have run via St. Luke's Hospital towards University.
810	see note	Rabat, Attard, Birkirkara (Psaila Street), Msida	University	Ran from Dingli or Mtarfa to University via Mater Dei. Ran from University to Dingli. May have run via St. Luke's Hospital.
867	Siġġiewi	Żebbuġ, Qormi, Ħamrun	Paceville	One-way only
881	Paceville	Ħamrun, Qormi, Żebbuġ, Rabat	Dingli	One-way only. May have run via Buskett Gardens and/or Dingli Cliffs.
890	Siġġiewi	Żebbuġ, Qormi, Ħamrun, Msida	University	Ran via St. Luke's Hospital and Mater Dei towards University. May have run via St. Luke's Hospital towards Siġġiewi.

==== Routes in Gozo ====
Route Number	Via	To	Notes
1	Għarb, San Lawrenz	Victoria	One-way only
2	San Lawrenz, Għarb	Victoria	One-way only
14	Santa Luċija, Kerċem	Victoria	One-way only
21	Żebbuġ (Marsalforn)	Żebbuġ (Qbajjar)	May start from Vajringa School instead.
25		Mġarr	May have run via Industrial Estate. May have run via Xewkija towards Mġarr.
42		Xewkija	May have run via St. Mary towards Xewkija. Ran via Għajnsielem, Qala and Nadur or St. Mary either towards Victoria. May have run via Ramla Bay and Nazzareno towards Victoria.
43	Nadur, Qala, Għajnsielem, Xewkija	Victoria	One-way only
50	Sannat, Ta' Ċenċ, Munxar	Victoria	One-way only
51	Sannat, Munxar	Victoria	One-way only
64		Xagħra	May have run via Xagħra (Nazzareno) and Ramla Bay towards Victoria.
65	Xagħra	Either back to Victoria via Xagħra (Nazzareno) or to Għajnsielem via Nadur and Qala. Both one-way only.	
87		Munxar (Xlendi)	
91	May serve any of the following destinations: Azure Window, Għarb, Għasri, San Lawrenz, Ta' Pinu, Żebbuġ		

=== Arriva routes (2011–2014) ===
On 3 July 2011, the Arriva group took over operation of scheduled bus services on Malta and Gozo, only to relinquish it in December 2013. A new government-owned company called Malta Public Transport took over fleet and operations, while a call for new operators to submit their bids was issued. These routes were in place from July 2011 until January 2014. These routes are no longer current, and it is not suggested that information regarding current services is taken from the following list.

Route number	From	Via	To	Notes
1	Valletta	Marsa, Paola (MCAST, Centre), Cospicua	Senglea	Now after the Għajn Dwieli Tunnel is passing from San Ġwann t'Għuxa area.
2	Valletta	Marsa, Paola (MCAST, Centre), Cospicua	Birgu	Eventually started passing also from the Verdala and Tal-Ħawli area.
11	Valletta	Pietà, Msida, Gżira, Sliema, St Julian's, Pembroke (P&R), Naxxar (Baħar iċ-Ċagħaq), Buġibba, Qawra, St. Paul's Bay, Xemxija, Mellieħa.	Ċirkewwa	Defunct route
13	Valletta	Pietà, Msida, Gżira, Sliema	St Julian's	Passed also from Swieqi and Pembroke.
21	Valletta	Pietà, Msida, Gżira, Sliema, San Ġwann, Għargħur, Naxxar	Mosta (Tarġa Gap)	Later terminated at Sliema Ferries and returned via Savoy Hill (served also on the way to Sliema Ferries, alongside Triq it-Torri).
22	Valletta	Pietà, Msida, Gżira, Sliema, San Ġwann, Mater Dei, University, Msida, Pietà	Valletta	Eventually started passing from Savoy, Rue D'Argens, and Ta' Giorni, and terminates at Birkirkara (Santa Liena).
23	Valletta	Pietà, Msida, Gżira, Sliema, San Ġwann, Għargħur, Naxxar, Mosta, Mġarr	Mġarr (Għajn Tuffieħa)	Defunct route
32	Valletta	Pietà, Msida, University, Mater Dei, San Ġwann, Sliema, Gżira, Ta' Xbiex, Msida, Pietà	Valletta	Now it is a circular route between Valletta, Swatar, and Birkirkara.
41	Valletta	Floriana, Pietà, Msida, Birkirkara, Lija/Iklin, Mosta (Technopark), Mosta, Buġibba, Qawra, St. Paul's Bay, Xemxija, Mellieħa	Ċirkewwa	Eventually stopped passing from Buġibba and Qawra.
43	Valletta	Floriana, Pietà, Msida, Birkirkara	Lija	Eventually started passing also from Iklin and Giovanni Curmi Higher Secondary School, Naxxar.
52	Valletta	Blata l-Bajda, Ħamrun, Santa Venera, Fleur-de-Lys, Attard, Ta' Qali, Rabat	Dingli	Eventually started passing from Ġużè Ellul Mercer Street and Misrah Suffara in Dingli and then to Dingli Bus Terminus.
71	Valletta	Floriana, Blata l-Bajda, Marsa, L-Ingieret, Luqa, Airport, Kirkop, Safi	Żurrieq	Eventually stopped passing from Airport.
72	Valletta	Floriana, Blata l-Bajda, Marsa, L-Ingieret, Luqa, Airport, Kirkop, Mqabba	Qrendi	Eventually stopped passing from Airport and Ingieret
81	Valletta	Blata l-Bajda, Ħamrun, Marsa (P&R), Marsa, Paola, Tarxien, Żejtun, Bir id-Deheb	Marsaxlokk	Eventually stopped passing from Marsa (P&R) and Ħamrun.
82	Valletta	Blata l-Bajda, Ħamrun, Marsa (P&R), Marsa, Paola, Tarxien, Bir id-Deheb	Birzebbuga	Eventually stopped passing from Marsa (P&R) and Ħamrun, but it is passing also from Tal-Papa area.
101	Mġarr (Ġnejna)	Mġarr, Għajn Tuffieħa, Manikata, Għajn Żejtuna, Mellieħa	Ċirkewwa	Previously, this route number was used for a circular service around Mellieħa (including Selmun, Ta' Pennellu, and Santa Maria Estate).
102	Mġarr (Ġnejna)	Mġarr, Żebbiegħ, Għajn Tuffieħa, Manikata, Wardija, Binġemma	Mellieħa	This route was merged into Route 101 and Selmun is no longer served by public transport.
105	Mosta (Technopark)	Naxxar, Birguma, Magħtab	Naxxar (Baħar iċ-Ċagħaq)	Defunct route
107	Mosta	Tal-Blata l-Għolja, Ta' Qali, Rabat, Buskett	Dingli	Defunct route
110	Mater Dei	University, Tal-Qroqq, Swatar, Ta' Paris	Birkirkara	Now is starting from Marsa (P&R) and is passing also from Cannon Road (Santa Venera), Fleur-de-Lys, San Ġwann, Ta' Giorni, Gżira, Sliema, St Julian's, and terminates at Pembroke (P&R).
114	Pembroke (P&R)	Tal-Ibraġ	Swieqi	Defunct route
115	Pembroke (P&R)	Madliena, Swieqi	Swieqi (High Ridge)	Defunct route
116	Sliema (Ferries)	Gżira, St Julian's (Balluta Bay), Sliema (Tigné)	Sliema (Ferries)	Defunct route
117	Airport	Kirkop, Safi, Żurrieq, Qrendi, Mqabba	Airport	This route is operating also to Marsa (P&R), Mater Dei and University.
118	Airport	Mqabba, Qrendi, Żurrieq, Safi, Kirkop	Airport	Defunct route
120	Paola	Santa Luċija, Airport, Luqa, Marsa (P&R), Luqa (L-Ingieret)	Ħal Farruġ	Eventually stopped passing from Santa Lucija, Airport, Luqa, St. Vincent de Paul (L-Ingieret), and Hal Farrug. Instead, it is starting from Pembroke to Xghajra and passing from San Giljan, San Ġwann, Kappara, Mater Dei, Birkirkara, Fleur-de-Lys, Marsa (P&R), Paola, Fgura and Zabbar.
121	Paola	Fgura, Bulebel, Żabbar, Birgu, Cospicua, Xgħajra, Fgura	Paola	This route had originally stopped operating, but was reactivated by Malta Public Transport in 2015 as an evening replacement of Route 120 between Xgħajra and Pembroke (P&R). It does not serve Mater Dei and the centre of Pembroke, but served Birkirkara (until the Mercer Stop).
122	Mater Dei	Mater Dei, Santa Venera, St Luke's Hospital, Ħamrun	Valletta	This route number was previously used for a direct route from Marsa (P&R) to Valletta.
123	Pembroke (P&R)	San Giljan, San Ġwann, San Ġwann Industrial Estate	Mater Dei	Defunct route
124	Bir id-Deheb	Żejtun, Bulebel, Żabbar, Marsaskala (Bellavista), Marsaskala (Żonqor)	Marsaskala (Centre)	Eventually stopped starting from Bir id-Deheb and is not passing from Zejtun and Bulebel instead is starting from Cospicua and is passing from Birgu and Marsaskala (San Tumas).
125	Blata l-Bajda	Birkirkara, Santa Venera, Ħamrun, Gwardamanġa, University	Mater Dei	Defunct route
126	Paola	Tarxien, Bulebel	Santa Luċija	Defunct route
128	Mosta (Rotunda)	Mosta (Technopark)	Naxxar	Defunct route
129	Buġibba	St. Paul's Bay	St. Paul's Bay (Wardija)	Defunct route and was replaced by Route 401, also discontinued.
131	Mellieħa (Centre)		Mellieħa (Santa Maria Estates)	Defunct route
134	Paola	MCAST	Kordin Industrial Estate	Defunct route
135	Airport	Gudja, Għaxaq, Bir id-Deheb, Żejtun	Marsaskala	Eventually started passing also from Luqa, Hal Farrug, St. Vincent de Paul (L-Ingieret), Marsa (P&R), and Mater Dei.
201	Airport	Żurrieq, Wied iż-Żurrieq (Blue Grotto), Siġġiewi, Dingli, Rabat	Rabat (Baħrija)	Defunct route in Baħrija.
202	Rabat	Ta' Qali, Attard, Birkirkara, Mater Dei, University, Msida (Tal-Qroqq), Sliema	St Julian's	This route was amended by Malta Public Transport in 2015 to serve Rabat and Sliema Ferries via Ta' Qali, Attard, Mosta, Naxxar, San Ġwann, Kappara, Pembroke (P&R), and St Julian's.
209	Mater Dei	University, Żebbuġ	Siġġiewi	Eventually also started passing from Qormi.
250	Mqabba	Qrendi, Żurrieq, Safi, Kirkop, Luqa, University	Mater Dei	This route initially stopped operating, but was reactivated by Malta Public Transport in 2015, originally between the University and Cirkewwa, but it was amended and now operates between Valletta and Għadira.

=== Proposed routes (2014) ===
These routes were proposed by the Maltese government in January 2014 after Arriva withdrew from the operation of bus services. They are similar to the current routes, with some minor changes having been made since and new routes having been introduced.

==== Routes in Malta ====
Route number	From	Via	To	Notes
01	Valletta	Blata l-Bajda, Marsa (Aldo Moro Road), Paola, Fgura, Cospicua (San Ġwann t'Għuxa)	Senglea	
02	Valletta	Blata l-Bajda, ll-Marsa (Aldo Moro Road), Paola, Għajn Dwieli, San Ġwann t'Għuxa, Cospicua	Birgu (Café Riche)	
03	Valletta	Blata l-Bajda, Marsa (Aldo Moro Road), Paola, Għajn Dwieli, Birgu (Café Riche) Cospicua (Fortini, Santa Liberata), Kalkara (Naval Cemetery, SmartCity, Rinella, Bighi)	Kalkara	
04	Valletta	Blata l-Bajda, Marsa (Aldo Moro Road), Paola, Għajn Dwieli, San Ġwann t'Għuxa, Cospicua (Verdala, Tal-Ħawli, Fortini), Birgu (Café Riche)	Birgu (Centre)	
13	Valletta	Pietà, Msida, Gżira, Sliema, St Julian's, Swieqi (St. Andrew's)	Naxxar (Baħar iċ-Ċagħaq)	
14	Valletta	Msida, Gżira, Sliema, St Julian's	Pembroke	
15	Valletta	Msida, Ta' Xbiex, Gżira	Sliema (Ferries)	
16	Valletta	Msida, Gżira, Sliema, St Julian's, Swieqi (Tal-Ibraġ)	Swieqi (Madliena)	
21	Valletta	Msida, Gżira (Rue d'Argens), Sliema (Savoy, Dingli Street, Tigné)	Sliema (Ferries)	
22	Valletta	Msida, Gżira (Rue d'Argens), Sliema (Mrabat), St Julian's (Ta' Giorni, Mensija), San Ġwann (Centre, Ta' Żwejt, San Ġwann Industrial Estate), Mater Dei, University	Birkirkara (Santa Liena)	
24	Valletta	Msida, Tal-Qroqq, San Ġwann (Kappara, Misraħ Lewża, Ta' Żwejt), Sliema (Mrabat), Gżira (Rue d'Argens), Tal-Qroqq, Msida, Pietà, Floriana	Valletta	
31	Valletta	Msida, Tal-Qroqq, University, Mater Dei, Birkirkara (Bypass), Iklin, Naxxar, Mosta (Technopark, Constitution Street), Burmarrad	Buġibba	
32	Valletta	Msida, Tal-Qroqq, Swatar, Tal-Qattus/Ta' Paris, Mater Dei, University, Tal-Qroqq, Msida, Pietà	Valletta	
41	Valletta	Msida, Birkirkara (Mannarinu), Lija (Ċimiterju), Mosta (Technopark, Centre, Constitution Street), Burmarrad, St. Paul's Bay, Xemxija, Mellieħa (Centre, Għadira, Marfa)	Ċirkewwa	
42	Valletta	Blata l-Bajda, Ħamrun, Santa Venera, Fleur-de-Lys, Birkirkara, Lija (Ċimiterju), Mosta (Technopark), Naxxar (Birguma, T'Alla u Ommu, Salina, Kennedy Grove), St. Paul's Bay, Xemxija, Mellieħa (Centre, Għadira, Marfa)	Ċirkewwa	
43	Valletta	Msida, Birkirkara (Mannarinu), Iklin, Naxxar (Ta' Simblija/Higher Secondary School)	Naxxar (Higher Secondary School)	
44	Valletta	Msida, Birkirkara (Mannarinu), Lija (Ċimiterju), Mosta (Technopark, Tal-Blata l-Għolja), Mġarr (Żebbiegħ, Centre, Ta' Mrejnu, Ballut), Manikata	Mġarr (Għajn Tuffieħa)	
45	Valletta	Msida, Birkirkara (Mannarinu), Lija (Ċimiterju), Mosta (Technopark, Centre, Constitution Street), Burmarrad, Qawra	Buġibba	
46	Valletta	Msida, Birkirkara (Mannarinu), Lija (Ċimiterju), Mosta (Technopark), Naxxar, San Pawl tat-Tarġa, Birguma	Għargħur	
47	Valletta	Blata l-Bajda, Mile End, St. Luke's Hospital, Gwardamanġa, Santa Venera (Psaila Street), Birkirkara, Lija (Ċimiterju), Mosta (Technopark, Centre, Constitution Street, San Anton Abbati, Santa Margarita, MCAST Mosta, Tarġa Gap, Ta' Żokrija, Ta' Beżbiżija)	Mosta (Centre)	
48	Valletta	Msida, Birkirkara (Mannarinu), Lija (Ċimiterju), Mosta (Technopark, Centre, Constitution Street), Burmarrad, St. Paul's Bay (Gillieru)	Buġibba	
49	Valletta	Msida, Birkirkara (Mannarinu), Lija (Ċimiterju), Mosta (Technopark), Naxxar (Centre, Birguma, T'Alla u Ommu, Salina, Kennedy Grove), St. Paul's Bay, Xemxija, Mellieħa (Centre, Għadira)	Armier	(till Għadira in winter)
50	Valletta	Blata l-Bajda, Ħamrun, Santa Venera, Fleur-de-Lys, Mrieħel, Attard (Ħal Warda), Ta' Qali, Rabat (Saqqajja, Bus Terminus)	Rabat (Santa Rita)	
51	Valletta	Blata l-Bajda, Ħamrun, Santa Venera, Fleur-de-Lys, Mrieħel, Attard (Ħal Warda), Ta' Qali, Rabat (Saqqajja, Tad-Dumnikani, Nigret)	Mtarfa	
52	Valletta	Blata l-Bajda, Ħamrun, Santa Venera, Fleur-de-Lys, Mrieħel, Attard (Ħal Warda), Ta' Qali, Saqqajja, Rabat (Tad-Dumnikani)	Dingli	
53	Valletta	Blata l-Bajda, Ħamrun, Santa Venera, Fleur-de-Lys, Mrieħel, Attard (Ħal Warda), Ta' Qali, Saqqajja, Rabat, Malta (Tad-Dumnikani, Tal-Virtù, Għar Barka, Nigret, Għeriexem)	Rabat	
54	Valletta	Msida, Birkirkara (Mannarinu), Lija, Balzan, Attard (Misraħ Kola)	Attard (Tal-Mirakli)	
56	Valletta	Blata l-Bajda, Ħamrun, Santa Venera, Fleur-de-Lys, Mrieħel, Attard (Ħal Warda), Ta' Qali (Crafts Village, Stadium), Rabat (Saqqajja, Nigret)	Dingli	
58	Valletta	Blata l-Bajda, Ħamrun, Santa Venera, Fleur-de-Lys	Birkirkara (Stazzjon)	
61	Valletta	Blata l-Bajda, Ħamrun, Marsa (P&R), Qormi (San Bastjan, Tal-Ħandaq, Ta' Paskarella), Żebbuġ (Sciortino, Ħal Muxi)	Żebbuġ (Ta' Kandlora)	
62	Valletta	Blata l-Bajda, Ħamrun, Marsa (P&R), Qormi (Manwel Dimech Street, Tal-Ħandaq, Ta' Paskarella), Żebbuġ (Siġġiewi Road)	Siġġiewi	
63	Valletta	Blata l-Bajda, Ħamrun, Marsa (P&R), Qormi (San Ġorġ)	Qormi (Ta' Farsina)	
64	Valletta	Blata l-Bajda, Ħamrun, Marsa (P&R), Qormi (Ċimiterju, Tal-Blat)	Santa Venera (Cannon Road)	
71	Valletta	Blata l-Bajda, Marsa (Aldo Moro Road, Industrial Estate), Luqa, Kirkop, Safi, Żurrieq (Xarolla)	Żurrieq	
72	Valletta	Blata l-Bajda, Marsa (Aldo Moro Road, Industrial Estate), Luqa, Kirkop, Mqabba	Qrendi	
73	Valletta	Blata l-Bajda, Marsa (Aldo Moro Road), Luqa (L-Ingieret, Ħal Farruġ, Centre), Kirkop, Żurrieq (Bubaqra)	Żurrieq	
74	Valletta	Blata l-Bajda, Ħamrun, Marsa (P&R), Luqa (L-Ingieret, Ħal Farruġ), Siġġiewi (Montekristo Estates), Mqabba (Ta' Kandja, Centre), Qrendi (Centre, Maqluba, Ħaġar Qim), Żurrieq (Wied iż-Żurrieq)	Żurrieq	
80	Valletta	Blata l-Bajda, Marsa (Aldo Moro Road), Santa Luċija, Żejtun, Bir id-Deheb, Birżebbuġa (Għar Dalam)	Birżebbuġa (Bajja s-Sabiħa)	
81	Valletta	Blata l-Bajda, Marsa (Aldo Moro Road), Paola, Tarxien, Bulebel, Żejtun (Ġebel San Martin, Centre), Bir id-Deheb	Marsaxlokk	
82	Valletta	Blata l-Bajda, Marsa (Aldo Moro Road), Paola, Tarxien, Tal-Barrani, Bir id-Deheb, Birżebbuġa (Għar Dalam)	Birżebbuġa (Tal-Papa)	
83	Valletta	Blata l-Bajda, Marsa (Aldo Moro Road), Paola, Tarxien (Xintill)	Santa Luċija	
84	Valletta	Blata l-Bajda, Marsa (Aldo Moro Road), Paola, Tarxien, Bulebel, Żejtun (Ġebel San Martin, Żejtun, Ta' Ganza, Ħal Tmiem, Ta' San Girgor), Bir id-Deheb	Żejtun	
85	Valletta	Blata l-Bajda, Marsa (Aldo Moro Road), Paola, Tarxien, Bulebel, Żejtun (Ġebel San Martin, Centre), Bir id-Deheb, Birżebbuġa (Għar Dalam, Qajjenza)	Marsaxlokk	
88	Valletta	Blata l-Bajda, Marsa (Aldo Moro Road), Paola, Tarxien, Tal-Barrani, Bir id-Deheb, Għaxaq	Gudja	
90	Valletta	Blata l-Bajda, Marsa (Aldo Moro Road), Paola, Fgura	Żabbar (Santwarju)	
91	Valletta	Blata l-Bajda, Marsa (Aldo Moro Road), Paola, Fgura, Żabbar	Marsaskala (San Tumas)	
92	Valletta	Blata l-Bajda, Marsa (Aldo Moro Road), Paola, Fgura, Żabbar (Tal-Plier, Sant' Antnin)	Marsaskala (Żonqor)	
93	Valletta	Blata l-Bajda, Marsa (Aldo Moro Road), Paola, Fgura, Żabbar (Tal-Plier, Sant' Antnin)	Marsaskala (Jerma)	
94	Valletta	Blata l-Bajda, Marsa (Aldo Moro Road), Paola, Fgura, Żabbar, St. Peter's	Xgħajra	
101	Mġarr	Mġarr (Żebbiegħ, Ta' Mrejnu, Għajn Tuffieħa), Manikata, Mellieħa, Popeye Village, Għadira, Marfa	Ċirkewwa	Only goes to Popeye Village during opening hours (09:30-17:30)
103	Bidnija	Tarġa Gap, Mosta (Rotunda, Tal-Awrora, Sgħajtar)	Naxxar	
106	University	Mater Dei, Birkikara (Bypass, Naxxar Road), Balzan, Attard	Attard (Tal-Mirakli)	
109	Baħrija	Rabat (L-Għemieri, Kunċizzjoni, Binġemma, Bus Terminus, Saqqajja), Ta' Qali, Attard (Ħal Warda), Żebbuġ, Siġġiewi (Centre, Tal-Providenza, Tal-Bajjada)	Siġġiewi (Għar LapsI)	
110	Marsa (P&R)	Santa Venera (Cannon Road), Fleur-de-Lys, Birkirkara, Swatar, Mater Dei, San Ġwann (Industrial Estate, Centre), Sliema (Mrabat, Dingli Street), St Julian's	Pembroke (P&R)	
117	Mqabba	Qrendi, Żurrieq (Tal-Bebbux, Nigret, Centre, Bubaqra), Safi, Kirkop, Airport, Luqa, Ħal Farruġ, L-Ingieret, Marsa (P&R), Ħamrun, Gwardamanġa, St. Luke's Hospital, Santa Venera, Mater Dei	University	
119	Marsaskala	Marsaskala (San Tumas), Żejtun (Ħal Tmiem, Ta' San Girgor), Bir id-Deheb, Marsaxlokk, Birżebbuġa (Il-Qajjenza, Centre, Freeport, Ħal Far)	Airport	
120	Xgħajra	St. Peter's, Żabbar, Fgura, Paola, Marsa (Aldo Moro Road, P&R), Ħamrun, Gwardamanġa, St. Luke's Hospital, Santa Venera, Mater Dei, University, San Ġwann Industrial Estate, San Ġwann, Mensija, Ta' Giorni, St Julian's	Pembroke (P&R)	
121	Xgħajra	St. Peter's, Żabbar, Fgura, Paola, Marsa (Aldo Moro Road, P&R), Mater Dei, University, San Ġwann Industrial Estate, San Ġwann, St Julian's	Pembroke (P&R)	
122	Valletta	Blata l-Bajda, Mile End, Gwardamanġa, St. Luke's Hospital, Santa Venera, Mater Dei	University	
124	Senglea	Cospicua, Birgu (Café Riche), Cospicua (Fortini, Tal-Ħawli), Żabbar, Marsaskala (Żonqor, San Tumas)	Marsaskala (Bellavista)	
130	Valletta	Floriana (St. Anne's Street, P&R), Marsa (Spencer Hill, Cruise Terminal), Valletta (Waterfront), Floriana (Boffa Hospital)	Valletta	
131	Valletta	Floriana (Public Library, Ospizio, Belt is-Sebħ, Balzunetta, Mall)	Valletta	
132	Valletta (Kastilja)	Floriana (St. Anne's Street, P&R)	Valletta (Kastilja)	
133	Valletta (Kastilja)	Valletta (St. Paul Street, Republic Street (South), Marsamxett, St. Elmo, Ta' Liesse), Floriana (Boffa Hospital, Polyclinic)	Valletta (Kastilja)	Circular route around Valletta and part Floriana
135	Marsaskala	Marsaskala (San Tumas), Żejtun (Ħal Tmiem, Ta' San Girgor), Bir id-Deheb, Għaxaq (Centre, Santu Rokku), Gudja (Ta' Xlejli, Centre), Luqa (Airport, Centre, Ħal Farruġ, L-Ingieret), Marsa (P&R), Mater Dei	University	
181	Dingli	Rabat (Tal-Virtù, Saqqajja, Bus Terminus), Ta' Qali, Attard (Ħal Warda, San Anton), Balzan, Birkirkara, Santa Venera (Psaila Street), Gwardamanġa, St. Luke's Hospital, Santa Venera, Mater Dei	University	
182	Mtarfa	Rabat (Nigret, Għar Barka, Saqqajja, Bus Terminus), Ta' Qali, Attard (Ħal Warda, San Anton), Balzan, Birkirkara, Santa Venera (Psaila Street), Gwardamanġa, St. Luke's Hospital, Santa Venera, Mater Dei	University	
186	Rabat (Bus Terminus)	Saqqajja, Ta' Qali, Attard (Tal-Mirakli, Triq Durumblat), Mosta (Ta' Mlit, Constitution Street), Burmarrad	Buġibba	
201	Rabat (Bus Terminus)	Rabat (Saqqajja, Dumnikani), Dingli (Centre, Dingli Cliffs), Siġġiewi (Il-Fawwara, Il-Girgenti, Centre, Tal-Providenza, Tal-Bajjada), Żurrieq (Wied iż-Żurrieq, Centre), Kirkop (Valletta Road)	Airport	
202	Rabat (Bus Terminus)	Saqqajja, Ta' Qali, Attard (Tal-Mirakli), Mosta (Technopark, Rotunda, Tal-Awrora, Sgħajtar), Naxxar, San Ġwann (Tal-Balal, Mrabat), St Julian's	Sliema (Ferries)	
203	Sliema (Ferries)	Gżira (Sea Front, Rue d'Argens), San Ġwann (Mrabat, Tal-Balal), Naxxar, Mosta (Technopark, Centre, Constitution Street), Burmarrad	Buġibba	
204	Marsaskala (Centre)	Marsaskala (San Tumas, Sant' Antnin), Żabbar (Tal-Plier), Fgura, Paola, Marsa (Aldo Moro Road, P&R), Ħamrun, Gwardamanġa, St. Luke's Hospital, Santa Venera, Mater Dei	University	
206	Żejtun	Żejtun (Ta' Ganza, Ta' San Girgor), Bir id-Deheb, Tarxien (Ġebel San Martin, Bulebel, Centre), Paola, Marsa (Aldo Moro Road, P&R), Ħamrun, Gwardamanġa, St. Luke's Hospital, Gwardamanġa, Santa Venera, Mater Dei	University	
209	Siġġiewi	Ta' Ħesri, Żebbuġ, Qormi (Ta' Paskarella, Victory Street, San Bastjan), Marsa (P&R), Ħamrun, Gwardamanġa, St. Luke's Hospital, Santa Venera, Mater Dei	University	
210	Birżebbuġa (Tal-Papa)	Birżebbuġa (Centre, Il-Qajjenza), Marsaxlokk, Bir id-Deheb, Żejtun, Tarxien (Ġebel San Martin, Bulebel, Centre), Paola, Marsa (Aldo Moro Road, P&R), Ħamrun, Gwardamanġa, St. Luke's Hospital, Gwardamanġa, Santa Venera, Mater Dei	University	
212	Sliema (Ferries)	St Julian's, Swieqi (St. Andrew's Road), Naxxar (Baħar iċ-Ċagħaq, Salina, Kennedy Grove)	Buġibba	
213	Senglea	Cospicua, Birgu (Café Riche), Cospicua (Fortini, Santa Liberata), Kalkara (Bighi), Cospicua (Tal-Ħawli, Verdala, San Ġwann t'Għuxa, Għajn Dwieli), Paola, Marsa (Aldo Moro Road), Blata l-Bajda, Mile End, Gwardamanġa, St. Luke's Hospital, Gwardamanġa, Santa Venera, Mater Dei	University	
218	Mqabba	Qrendi, Żurrieq (Tal-Bebbux, Centre, Xarolla), Safi, Kirkop, Airport, Luqa, Marsa Industrial Estate, Marsa (Aldo Moro Road, P&R), Ħamrun, Gwardamanġa, St. Luke's Hospital, Santa Venera, Mater Dei	University	
221	Ċirkewwa	Mellieħa (Marfa, Għadira, Centre), Xemxija, St. Paul's Bay	Buġibba	
222	Ċirkewwa	Mellieħa (Marfa, Għadira, Centre), Xemxija, St. Paul's Bay, Naxxar (Kennedy Grove, Salina, Baħar iċ-Ċagħaq), Pembroke (P&R), Swieqi (St. Andrew's Road), St Julian's	Sliema (Ferries)	
223	Sliema (Ferries)	Qawra, St. Paul's Bay (Centre, L-Imbordin), Mġarr (Tal-Ballut, Għajn Tuffieħa)	Mġarr (Bajja tal-Mixquqa)	
225	Sliema (Ferries)	St Julian's, Swieqi (St. Andrew's Road), Naxxar (Baħar iċ-Ċagħaq, Salina, Kennedy Grove), St. Paul's Bay (Centre, L-Imbordin), Mġarr (Tal-Ballut, Għajn Tuffieħa)	Mġarr (Bajja tal-Mixquqa)	
226	Gudja	Għaxaq, Bir id-Deheb, Tal-Barrani, Santa Luċija, Marsa (Aldo Moro Road, P&R), Ħamrun, Gwardamanġa, St. Luke's Hospital, Gwardamanġa, Santa Venera, Mater Dei	University	
233	Swieqi	Tal-Ibraġ, Madliena, Victoria Gardens, Pembroke (P&R), St Julian's, Sliema, Gżira, Ta' Xbiex, Msida, Tal-Qroqq, Mater Dei	University	
238	Mġarr	Żebbiegħ, Mosta (Ta' Żokkrija, Beżbiżija, Rotunda, Tal-Awrora, Sgħajtar, Technopark), Lija (Ċimiterju), Birkirkara (Bypass), Mater Dei	University	
250	Ċirkewwa	Marfa, Għadira, Mellieħa, Xemxija, St. Paul's Bay, Burmarrad, Mosta (Tarġa Gap, Rotunda, Technopark), Lija (Ċimiterju), Birkirkara (Bypass), Mater Dei	University	
260	Għargħur	Birguma, San Pawl tat-Tarġa, Naxxar, Mosta (Sgħajtar, Santa Margarita, Tarġa Gap, Rotunda, Technopark), Lija (Ċimiterju), Birkirkara (Bypass), Mater Dei	University	
280	Buġibba	Qawra, Burmarrad, Mosta (Tarġa Gap, Rotunda, Technopark), Lija (Ċimiterju), Birkirkara, Mater Dei	University	
X1	Airport	Luqa (Centre, Ħal Farruġ), Qormi (Manwel Dimech Street), Marsa (P&R), Mater Dei, University, Tal-Qroqq, Swieqi (St. Andrew's Road), Pembroke (P&R), Naxxar (Baħar iċ-Ċagħaq, Salina, Kennedy Grove), Xemxija, Mellieħa (Centre, Għadira, Marfa)	Ċirkewwa	
X2	Airport	Luqa (Council of Europe Street), Santa Luċija (Luqa Road), Tarxien (Xintill), Paola, Marsa (Aldo Moro Road, P&R), Mater Dei, University, Tal-Qroqq, Swieqi (St. Andrew's Road)	Pembroke (P&R)	
X3	Airport	Luqa (Council of Europe Street), Santa Luċija (Luqa Road), Tarxien (Xintill), Paola, Marsa (Aldo Moro Road, P&R), Birkirkara (Mannarinu), Balzan, Attard (San Anton, Ħal Warda), Ta' Qali, Rabat (Saqqajja, Bus Terminus, L-Għeriexem), Mtarfa (Bypass), Mosta (Ta' Żokkrija, Tarġa Gap), Burmarrad	Buġibba	
X4	Valletta	Blata l-Bajda, Ħamrun, Marsa (P&R), Qormi (Triq Manwel Dimech), Ħal Farruġ, Luqa, Airport, Ħal Far, Il-Port Ħieles	Birżebbuġa	

==== Routes in Gozo ====
Route number	From	Via	To	Notes
301	Victoria	Xewkija (Industrial Estate, Heliport, Santa Ċilja), Għajnsielem (Mġarr Road, Fort Chambray)	Mġarr	
302	Victoria	Xewkija (Gozo General Hospital, MCAST Gozo, Ta' Xħajma), Nadur, (Ta' Binġemma)	Xagħra (Ramla Bay)	
303	Victoria	Xewkija (Industrial Estate, Ta' Xħajma), Nadur (San Blas, Centre), Qala, Għajnsielem (Sant' Antnin)	Mġarr	
305	Victoria	Taċ-Ċawla, Sannat, Ta' Ċenċ, Ta' Seguna	Munxar	
306	Victoria	Taċ-Ċawla, Munxar	Munxar (Xlendi)	
307	Victoria	Xagħra (Ta' Żejta, Ta' Ħamet, Il-Ġgantija, Centre, Ġnien Xibla, Ġnien Imrik, Tas-Sruġ)	Xagħra (Centre)	
308	Victoria	Ta' Wara s-Sur, Għarb (Ta' Pinu), Għammar, Il-Fanal	Għasri	
309	Victoria	Ta' Wara s-Sur	Żebbuġ	
310	Victoria	Tal-Kapuċċini, Xwejni, Qbajjar	Żebbuġ (Marsalforn)	

== City Sightseeing Malta routes ==
=== South Route ===
The following is the list of stops for the Southern Route operated by City Sightseeing Malta.

Stop No.	Location
S10	ex-TS Roundabout (Radisson and Corinthia Hotels)
S11	St. George's Bay (City Sightseeing route stage)
S12	Saint Julian's (Westin Dragonara Arch)
S13	Saint Julian's (Hilton Roundabout)
S14	Saint Julian's (Spinola Bay)
S15	Saint Julian's (Balluta Bay)
S16	Sliema Seafront (Preluna Hotel)
S17	Sliema Ferries
S18	Sliema Seafront (Bayview Hotel)
S19	Valletta City Centre
S20	Valletta (Malta Experience/Fort St. Elmo)
S21	Valletta Waterfront Terminus
S22	Vittoriosa Waterfront
S23	Esplora Science Centre
S24	Marsaxlokk Fishing Village
S25	Għar Dalam Cave
S26	Blue Grotto
S27	Ħaġar Qim & Mnajdra Temples

=== Northern Route ===
The following is the list of stops for the Northern Route operated by City Sightseeing Malta.

Stop No.	Location
N1	Buġibba (Topaz Hotel)
N2	Buġibba (Pebbles Hotel)
N3	Buġibba Jetty (Seatrips Outlet)
N4	Buġibba Centre
N5	Buġibba (Santana Hotel)
N6	Malta National Aquarium
N7	Qawra Seafront (Qawra Palace Hotel)
N8	Qawra Seafront (iSeeMalta Outlet)
N9	Qawra Seafront (Bellavista Hotel)
N10	ex-ITS Roundabout (Radisson and Corinthia Hotels)
N11	Saint Julian's (Saint George's Bay)
N12	Saint Julian's (Westin Dragonara Arch)
N13	Saint Julian's (Hilton Roundabout)
N14	Saint Julian's (Spinola Bay)
N15	Saint Julian's (Balluta Bay)
N16	Sliema Seafront (Preluna Hotel)
N17	Sliema Ferries
N18	Sliema Seafront (Bayview Hotel)
N19	Valletta City Centre
N20	Valletta Waterfront Terminus
N21	San Anton Gardens
N22	Ta' Qali Crafts Village
N23	Ta' Qali Aviation Museum
N24	Mosta Church
N25	Mdina (Main Gate) / Rabat (Domus Romana)
N26	Mġarr (Ta' Skorba and Ta' Ħaġrat Temples)
N27	Golden Bay

== See also ==
- Buses in Malta
- Transport in Malta
