= List of hospitals in Malta =

The following is a list of hospitals in Malta.

== Public hospitals ==
=== Open ===
Name	Locale	Purpose
Mater Dei Hospital (L-Isptar Mater Dei)	Msida	Acute and general care, teaching hospital
Karin Grech Hospital (L-Isptar Karen Grech)	Pietà	Rehabilitation
St. Vincent De Paul Residence (San Vincenz de Paul or L-Ingieret)	Luqa	Long-term care
Mount Carmel Hospital (L-Isptar Monti Karmeli)	Attard	Psychiatric hospital
Zammit Clapp Hospital (L-Isptar Zammit Clapp)	San Giljan	Nursing home
Gozo General Hospital (L-Isptar Generali ta' Ghawdex)	Victoria	General hospital for the island of Gozo

=== Closed ===
Name	Locale	Purpose
St. Luke's Hospital (L-Isptar San Luqa)	Pietà	Former Acute General Teaching Hospital
Sir Paul Boffa Hospital (L-Isptar Boffa)	Floriana	Former Oncology and Dermatology Hospital
RNH Mtarfa	L-Imtarfa	Former Hospital
St Philip's Hospital	Santa Venera	Former Private Hospital
RNH Bighi	Il-Kalkara	Former Hospital

== Private hospitals ==
- Saint Thomas Hospital, Qormi
- Good Samaritan Hospital, St. Paul's Bay
- DaVinci Hospital, B'Kara (private hospital)
- Saint James Hospital Group
  - Saint James Capua Hospital, Sliema
  - Saint James Hospital, Żejtun

== Historical ==
In 1625, Caterina Scappi founded the first hospital exclusively for women in Malta, known as La Casetta or Santa Maria della Scala, and later Santa Maria della Pietà. The hospital was eventually destroyed.
