= St Philip's Hospital =

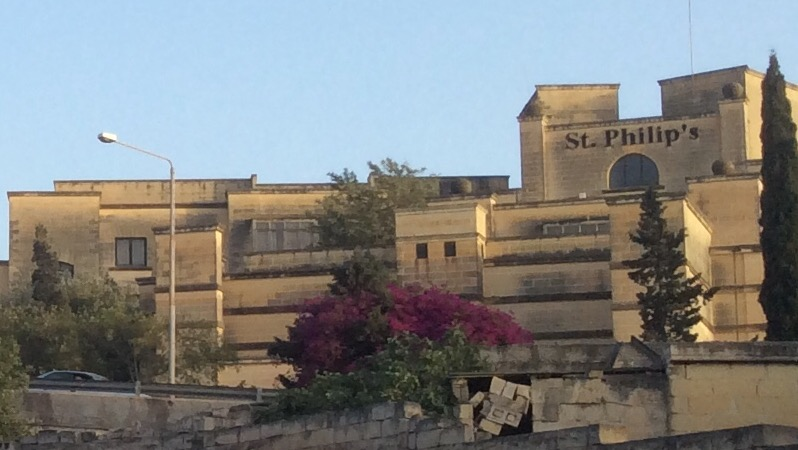

Geography
- Location: Santa Venera, Malta
- Coordinates: 35°53′35″N 14°28′56″E

Services
- Emergency department: No
- Beds: 100

History
- Opened: 1993

Links
- Website: stphilips.com.mt
- Lists: Hospitals in Malta

St Philip's Hospital is a former 100-bed capacity hospital located in Santa Venera, Malta. It has been closed since 2012.

== History ==
A letter of intent approving the set up of a private hospital was issued by the Government of Malta in 1992. In 1993, the company owning the hospital, Golden Shepherd Ltd, was registered. It was owned by Frank Portelli. Construction of the hospital was completed and it was opened in 1995.

=== Financial difficulties and closure ===
The private hospital closed its doors in 2012 after running into financial problems. According to the last set of accounts filed with the Registry of Companies for 2006, the company running it reported a loss of more than €500,000. It was subsequently put up for sale.

=== Attempted acquisition by the government of Malta ===
In October 2012, the government attempted to acquire St Philip’s Hospital for €850,000 a year for eight years on lease. It was planned to be used as a rehabilitation facility to ease the bed shortage at Mater Dei Hospital. The government also negotiated an option to buy the hospital for €12.4 million from the third year onwards. However, the deal fell through when the government pulled out.
