= St. Augustine's College (Malta) =

Faith school in Malta

Coordinates: 35°52′52″N 14°29′37″E

St Augustine College
- Kulleġġ Santu Wistin

Location
- 60 Triq Simpson; Primary campus: Marsa Secondary sampus: Pietà; Malta

Information
- Type: Church School
- Religious affiliation: Catholic
- Patron saint: Augustine of Hippo
- Established: 1848; 178 years ago
- Founder: Gaetano Pace Forno
- Status: In session
- Rector: David Cortis
- Acting headteacher: Ms Isabelle Bajada, Ms Romina Sharma, Ms Veronique DeGabrielle Ferrante, Ms Doronia Cortis, Ms Abigail Spiteri, Ms Bernice Falzon Briffa, Ms Marlene Borg, Mr Glenn Mifsud, Ms Edel Ferry, Mr Michael Gauci
- Head of primary: TBD
- Head of secondary: Karen Piscopo
- Year: 1 to 11
- Gender: Male
- Enrollment: 792

St Augustine College in Malta was established as a faith school for boys by the Order of Saint Augustine in 1848 by Gaetano Pace dei Baroni Forno. He founded it in Valletta next door to the church of St. Augustine. It has since been relocated to Pietà. Since then, the primary sector has opened up in Marsa.

== Bibliography ==
=== External links ===
- St Augustine College in Malta St Augustine Homepage
- Augnet International Cooperative Web Site for Schools in the Tradition of St. Augustine
- Order of St Augustine, International Homepage
