= Frank Portelli (politician) =

Maltese politician (1944–2026)

Frank George Portelli

Member of Parliament
- In office 9 July 1987 – 20 January 1992

Personal details
- Born: 8 June 1944 Hamrun, Malta
- Died: October 26, 2026 (aged 82)
- Party: Partit Nazzjonalista
- Spouses: Unnamed wife (div. 1986) Jenny Portelli (m. 1994)
- Children: 3
- Education: University of Malta

Frank George Portelli (8 June 1944 – October 2026) was a Maltese surgeon and politician who was a member of the House of Representatives of Malta, serving during the 1987–1992 legislature.

== Career ==
Portelli was president of Executive Committee of the Nationalist Party between 1985 and 1992. Between 1995 and 1998, he held the position of President of the General Council for the same party. He was head of the Maltese delegation to the Council of Europe in 1987.

He was the CEO of St Philip's Hospital in Malta.

=== European Parliament ===
In March 2009, then leader of the Nationalist Party Lawrence Gonzi asked Portelli to stand as a European parliamentary candidate for the MEP elections of 6 June. He failed to be elected.

== Personal life ==
Frank George Portelli was born in Ħamrun but lived in San Pawl il-Baħar.

Portelli was previously married and in 1986 obtained a divorce from the United Kingdom during a time when divorce in Malta was illegal. He later married Jenny Portelli on 27 August 1994. Portelli had 3 children, 2 from his first marriage.

Frank Portelli died on 26 October 2026, at the age of 82.
