= Saint James Capua Hospital =

Coordinates: 35.9131°N 14.5033°E

- Saint James Hospital Group

Geography
- Location: Sliema, Malta

Organisation
- Type: Private

Services
- Emergency department: Yes
- Beds: 74

History
- Opened: 1996

Links
- Website: stjameshospital.com/about/locations/saint-james-capua-hospital-sliema/
- Lists: Hospitals in Malta

Saint James Capua Hospital is a private hospital located in Sliema, Malta. The hospital was founded in 1996 as the Capua Palace Hospital, named for the Palazzo Capua on whose former gardens the hospital was constructed. In 2002 the hospital was taken over by Saint James Hospital Group, which owns other hospitals in Malta, Libya and Hungary.

== Departments ==
Saint James Hospital Group offers private medical care across many departments, each specialised in a particular field.

== See also ==
- List of hospitals in Malta
