= Palazzo Capua =

Neoclassic palace in Sliema, Malta

Coordinates: 35°54′45.5″N 14°30′9.9″E

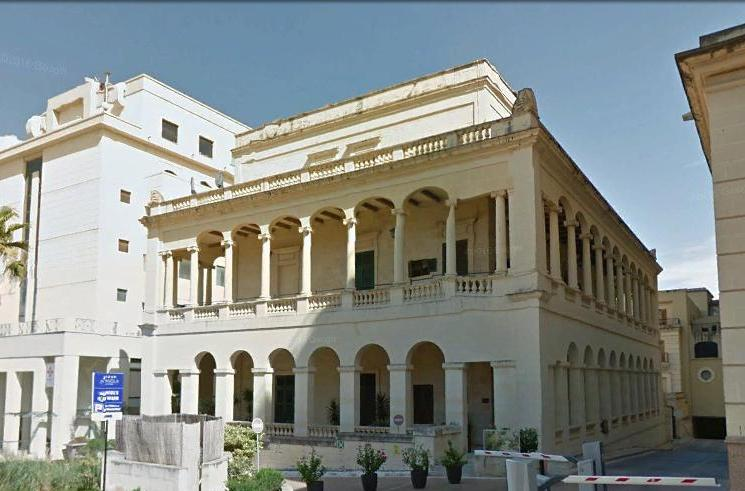
A view of Palazzo Capua

Palazzo Capua, also known as Capua Palace, is an early 19th-century Neoclassic palace in Sliema, Malta. It was built by Biagio Tagliaferro, who was a banker, philanthropist, and is considered the father of Maltese maritime. Tagliaferro named the building Selma Hall. It later came into the possession of the Prince of Capua Carlo de Borbon, and his wife Penelope Caroline Smyth, for whom it is still named today.

At the time of construction it was the most attractive building of the area, surrounded by extensive country views when most of Sliema was underdeveloped. It has always been identified by its Neoclassic architecture, notably with the use of columns on its façade. The area where the place is found has been built up throughout the 19th and 20th centuries. Since the early 20th century the Capua Palace has gone under different adaptive reuse. The building now hosts a boutique hotel and BSC Malta College, an English language college, while the St James Capua Hospital was built on the site of its former gardens.

The architecture of the building is attributed to William Scamp.
