= Gozo General Hospital =

- Ministry for Health and Active Ageing
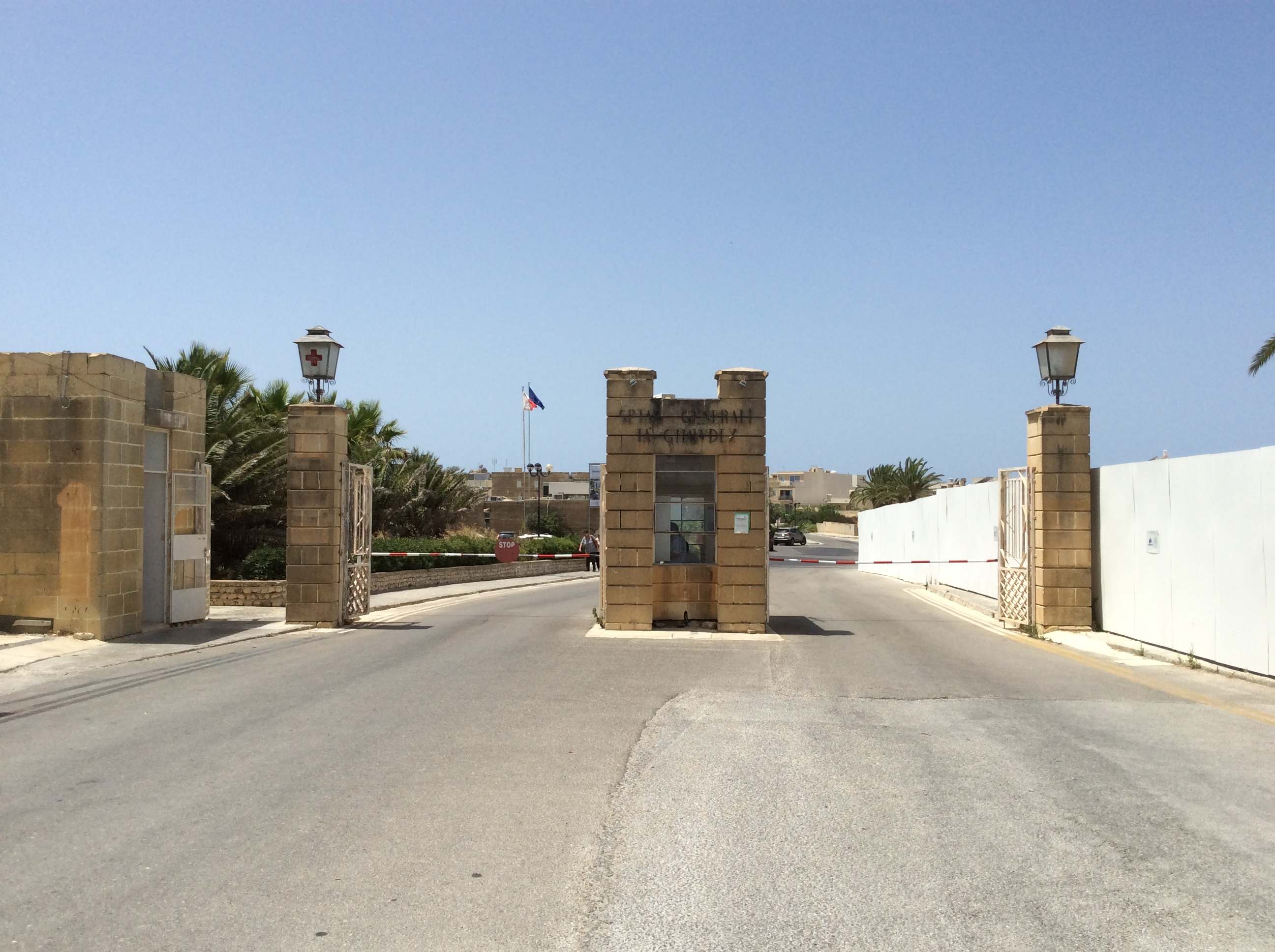
- The entrance of the Hospital

- Location within Malta Location within Mediterranean

Geography
- Location: l-Arcisqof Pietru Pace Street, Victoria, VCT 2520, Victoria, Gozo, Malta
- Coordinates: 36°2′26″N 14°14′45″E

Services
- Beds: 303

Links
- Lists: Hospitals in Malta

The Gozo General Hospital (Maltese: L-Isptar Ġenerali ta' Għawdex) is the only hospital of Gozo, the second largest island in Malta. The hospital provides both inpatient and outpatient medical and surgical services. In addition, the hospital is equipped with an emergency service and is connected with hospitals on mainland Malta with an air ambulance service based in Gozo.

== History ==
The hospital was opened in 1975, initially named Craig Hospital after a Maltese surgeon, and renamed in 1989.
