= St. Luke's Hospital, Malta =

Saint Luke's Hospital L-Isptar San Luqa
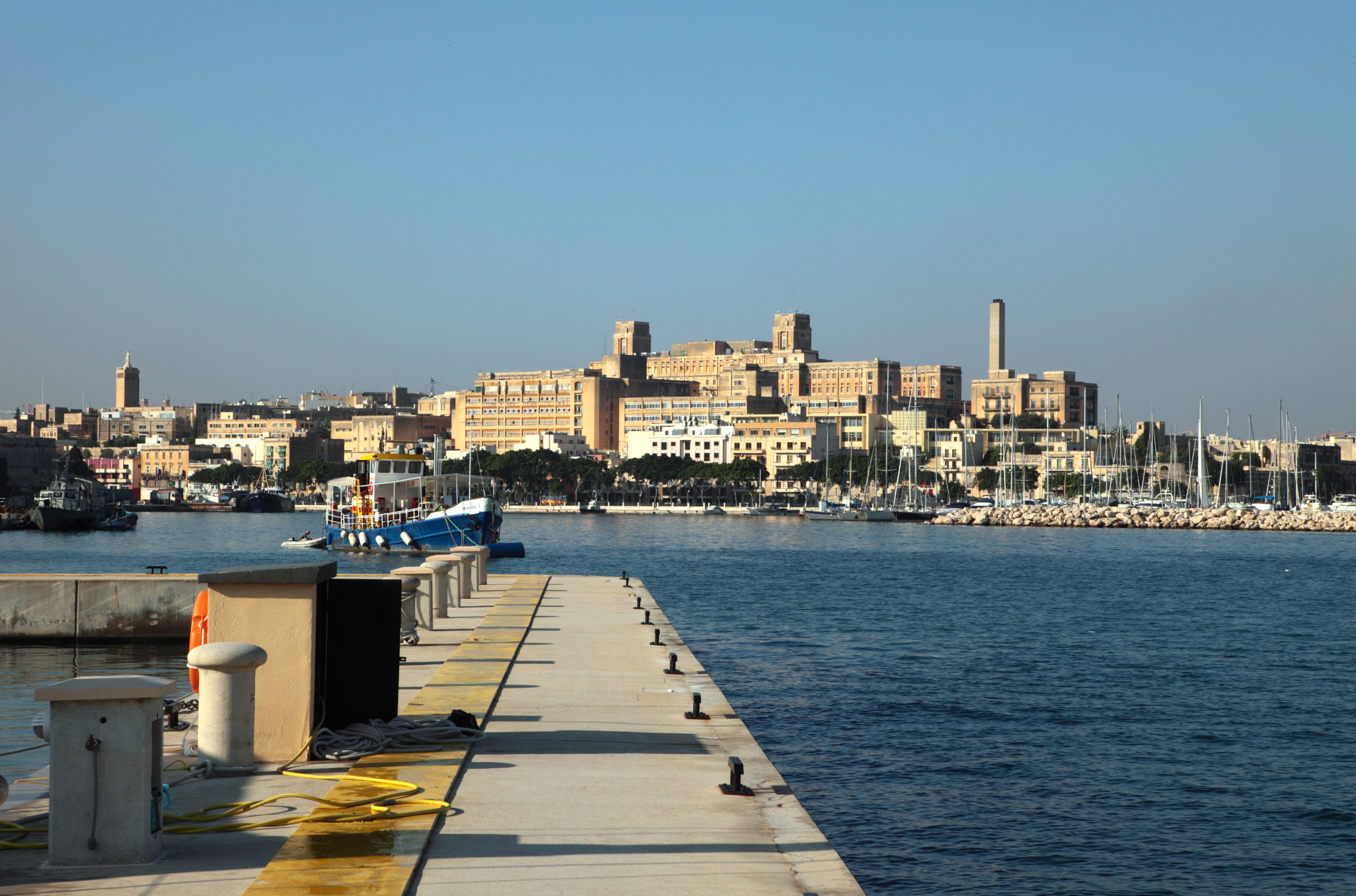
- Saint Luke's Hospital as seen from Marsamxett Harbour

Geography
- Location: Pietà, Malta
- Coordinates: 35°53′36″N 14°29′39″E

Organisation
- Type: General

Services
- Emergency department: Yes
- Beds: 850

History
- Founded: 1930
- Closed: 2007

Links
- Lists: Hospitals in Malta

St. Luke's Hospital (Maltese: L-Isptar San Luqa) is a former general hospital located on Gwardamanġia hill, in Pietà, Malta.

== History ==
The hospital's foundation was laid on 5 April 1930 by the Governor of Malta, John Du Cane, in the presence of then Prime Minister, Gerald Strickland. Progress in the construction of the hospital was slow due to technical difficulties encountered. By 1939, at the onset of the Second World War, the hospital was still incomplete and the work was suspended.

In 1941, the main block was converted into an isolation hospital for infectious diseases. The hospital, by then given the official title of St. Luke's Hospital, dealt with several epidemics ranging from measles to typhoid, typhus, poliomyelitis, scabies and ringworm.

By the late 1940s the hospital assumed its role as a general hospital with facilities for treating general medical, surgical, gynaecological and paediatric cases. In 1948 the radiology department was opened.

The hospital building is included in the National Inventory of the Cultural Property of the Maltese Islands.

== University of Malta affiliation ==
The Hospital served students attending Medical and Health Sciences courses within the University of Malta. The former medical school still houses the depository of pre-1965 monographs and all editions of medical and nursing journals.

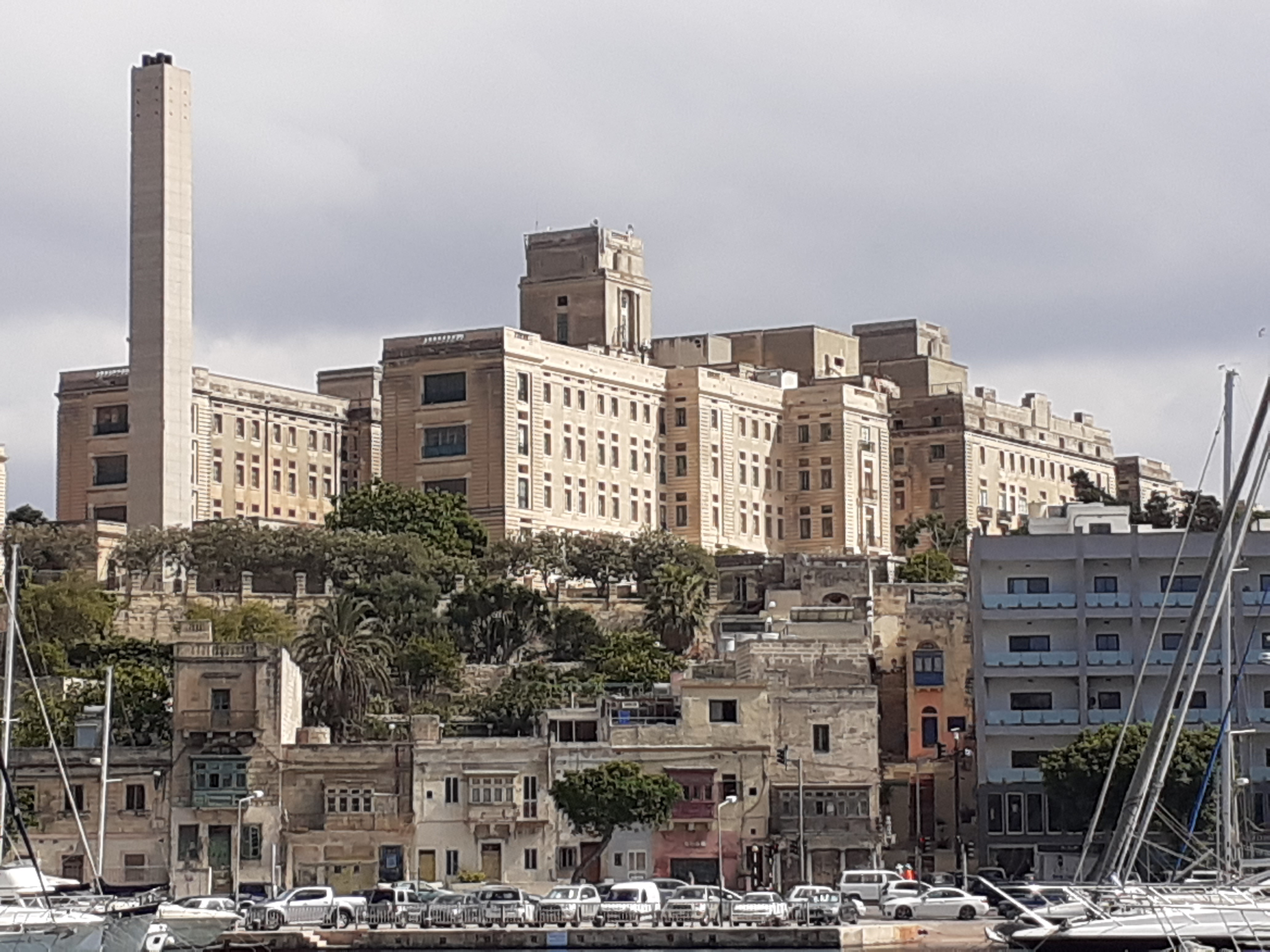
St Luke's Hospital seen from Ta' Xbiex

== Replacement ==
In June 2007, St. Luke's hospital ceased to be Malta's main general hospital, having been replaced by Mater Dei Hospital.

== See also ==
- List of hospitals in Malta
