= Ta' Qali Crafts Village =

Ta' Qali Crafts Village Villaġġ ta l'Artiġjanat Ta' Qali
- Crafts Village
- Ta' Qali Crafts Village
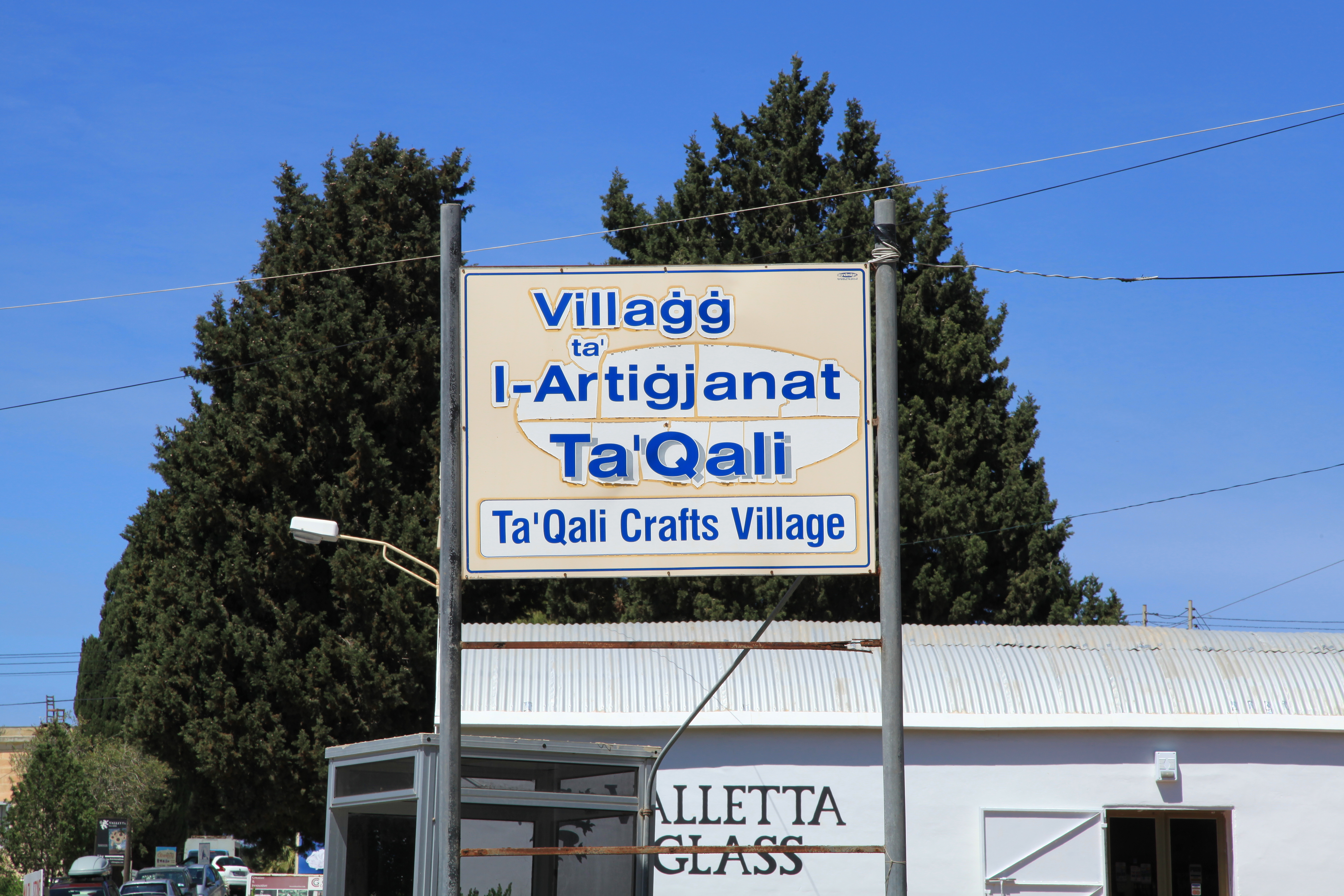
- The decadent entrance sign to the complex

- Location within Malta
- Coordinates: 35°53′30″N 14°25′15″E

Area
  - Total: 38.4 ha (95 acres)
  - Urban: 6.7 ha (17 acres)

Dimensions
  - Length: 0.91 km (0.57 mi)
  - Width: 0.44 km (0.27 mi)
- Elevation: 110 m (360 ft)

The Ta' Qali Crafts Village is a tourist attraction in Ta' Qali, Malta. Cultural and traditional artefacts are made and sold within the village. As of 2019, refurbishments have taken place that have led to the upgrading of the premises from the nissen huts used in the British airfield, RAF Ta Kali, that was built near the village to larger traditional Maltese buildings. The renovations came in at around 13 million euros. The crafts village is also the location of the annual festa lwien.
