= Mater Dei Hospital =

Coordinates: 35°54′6.58″N 14°28′36.28″E

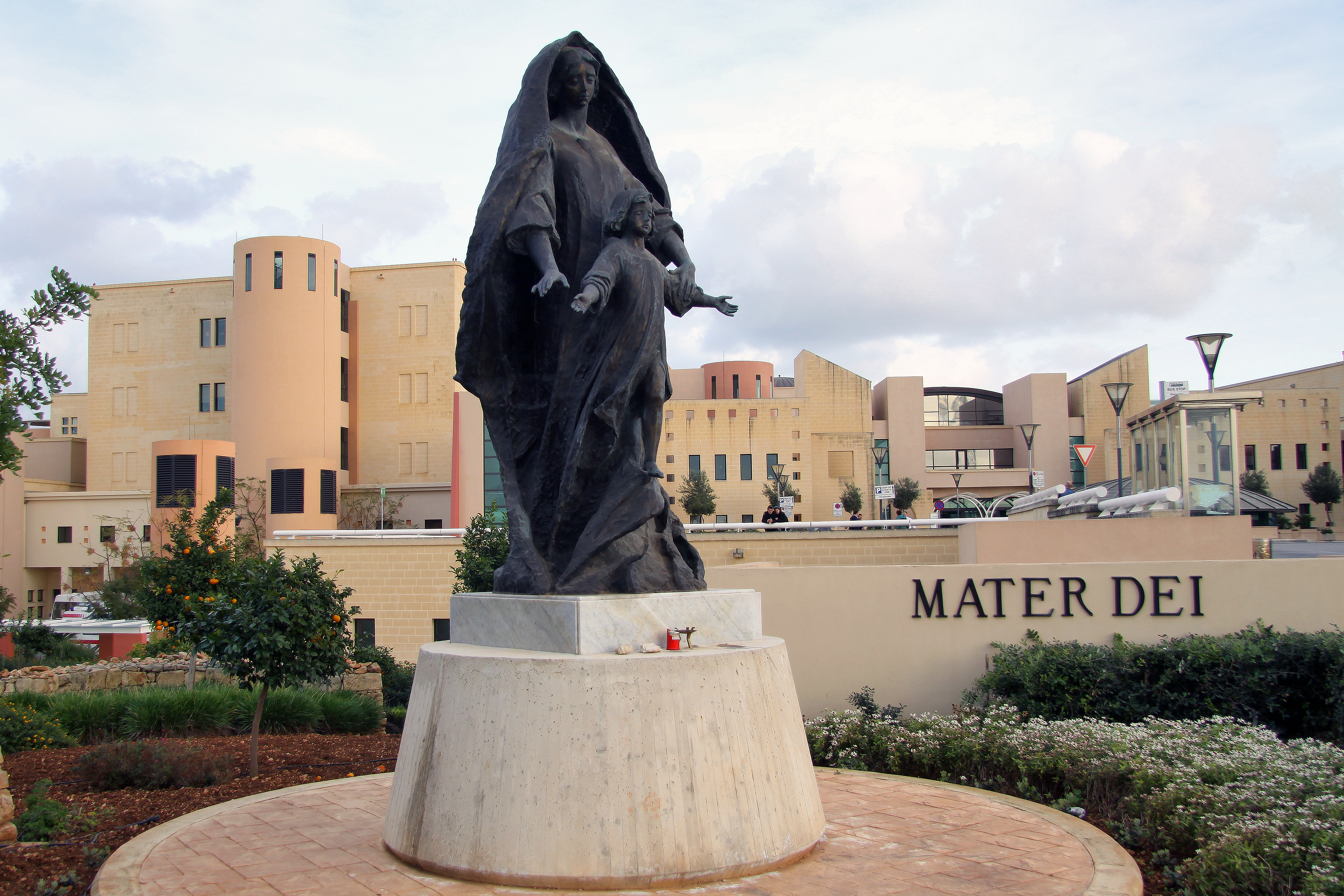
- The main entrance of Mater Dei Hospital

Geography
- Location: Msida, Central Region, Malta

Organisation
- Care system: Malta National Health Service
- Type: District General, Teaching
- Affiliated university: University of Malta

Services
- Emergency department: Yes
- Beds: 1,243

History
- Former name: San Raffaele Hospital
- Founded: June 29, 2007

Links
- Website: https://healthservices.gov.mt/en/MDH/Pages/Home.aspx
- Lists: Hospitals in Malta

Mater Dei Hospital (MDH; Maltese: Sptar Mater Dei), also known simply as Mater Dei, is an acute general and teaching hospital in Msida, Malta. It was opened in 2007, replacing St. Luke's Hospital. It is a public hospital affiliated to the University of Malta, offering general and specialist services.

== History ==
The hospital opened on 29 June 2007, replacing St. Luke's Hospital as the main public general hospital. The 250,000 square metre complex includes 825 beds and 25 operating theaters. It was built by Skanska Malta JV, a subsidiary of the Swedish construction firm Skanska. The project was planned to cost Lm 50,000,000 (around €116,000,000), but the cost skyrocketed to more than Lm 250,000,000 (around €582,000,000).

Skanska was entrusted with the building of a new general hospital in Malta, and the "state-of-the-art" Mater Dei Hospital cost over €700,000,000. Later, however, it was discovered that Skanska had used lower-quality cement of the kind that is generally used to build pavements. As a result, the hospital could not develop further floors or build a helipad on the roof.

== University of Malta affiliation ==
The hospital is located adjacent to the University of Malta, and contains the faculties of Health Sciences, Medicine and Surgery, and Dental Surgery in a purpose built Medical School wing. Prior to the COVID-19 pandemic, the hospital used to house the Health Sciences Library, which is a branch library of the University of Malta Library.

== Sir Anthony Mamo Oncology Centre ==
The Sir Anthony Mamo Oncology Centre welcomed its first 50 outpatients on 22 December 2014. The centre started being excavated in 2010 and building started in 2012. It is named after the first president of Malta Sir Anthony Mamo. It cost €52 million and an estimated €8 million a year is required to run it. The centre is offering more advanced radiotherapy with two machines commissioned from the Leeds Spencer Centre, where they were introduced in 2013. The machines enable more precise radiotherapy and stronger doses reducing the length and frequency of sessions. Considerations by the Maltese Government for expanding radiotherapy services to include autologous transplants have also been made. The government has also considered the development of a clinical trials unit through which Maltese patients would be able to benefit from new medicines not yet on the market. Beds at the new centre increased from the 78 at Boffa Hospital to 113 and the outpatient clinics from two to 12. The type of chemotherapy provided is more advanced. Palliative care beds were also increased from the 10 at Boffa to 16. A new MRI machine will help reduce waiting lists. Patients and their families would be followed before, during and after treatment and more training provided for staff. A total of 47 new professionals have been recruited on its opening day.

== See also ==
- List of hospitals in Malta
