= Pietà, Malta =

Pietà Tal-Pietà
- Local council
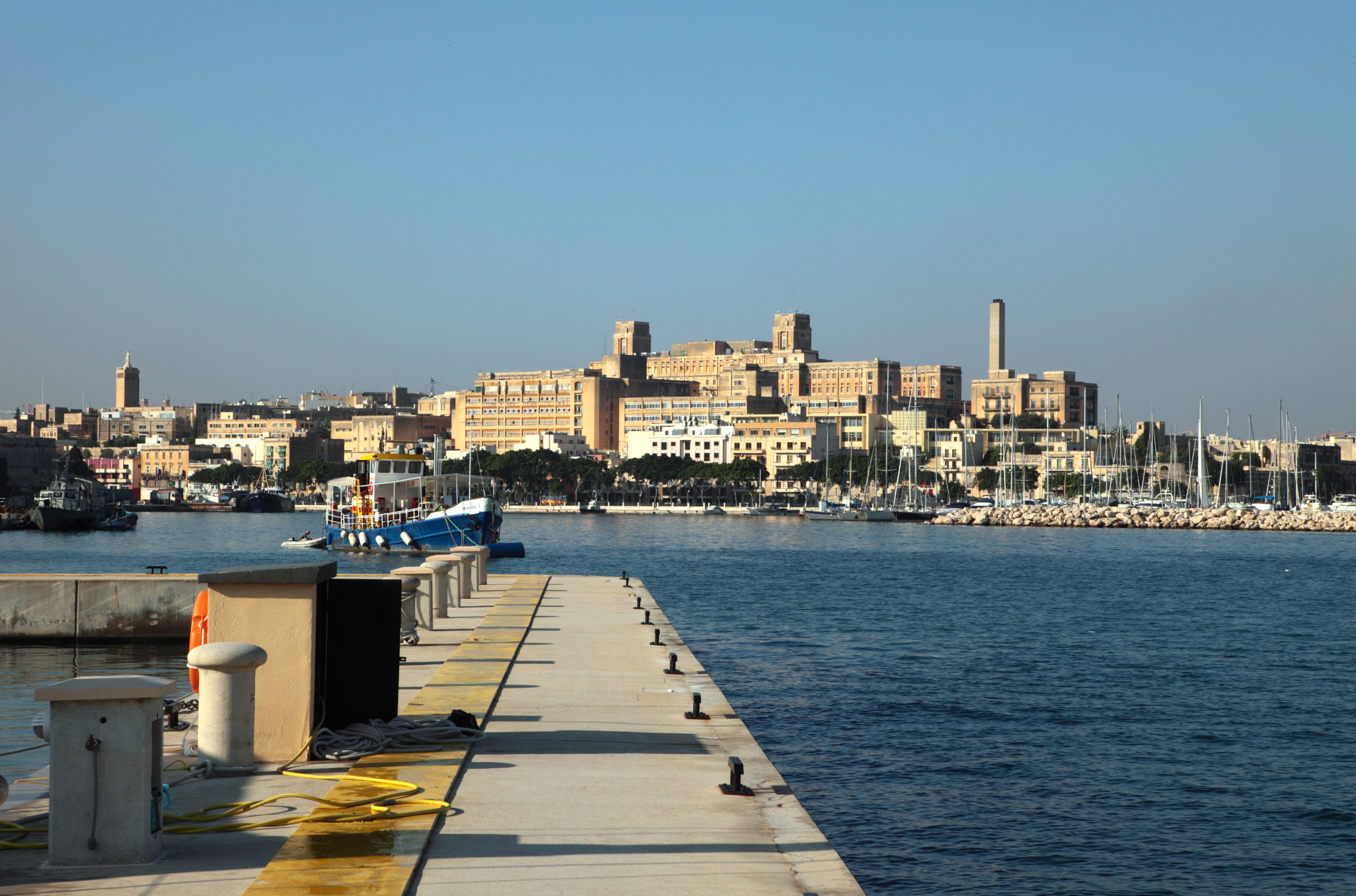
- Pietà skyline with St. Luke's Hospital

- Flag Coat of arms

- Coordinates: 35°53′35″N 14°29′37″E
- Country: Malta
- Region: Eastern Region
- District: Northern Harbour District
- Borders: Floriana, Ħamrun, Msida

Government
  - Mayor: Keith Tanti (PL)

Area
  - Total: 0.5 km^{2} (0.19 sq mi)

Population (Jul. 2024)
  - Total: 7,086
  - Density: 14,000/km^{2} (37,000/sq mi)
- Demonym(s): Pjetaniż (m), Pjetaniża (f), Pjetaniżi (pl)
- Time zone: UTC+1 (CET)
  - Summer (DST): UTC+2 (CEST)
- Postal code: PTA
- Dialing code: 356
- ISO 3166 code: MT-41
- Patron saint: Our Lady of Fatima
- Day of festa: Between last week of May and first Sunday of June
- Website: pietalc.gov.mt

Pietà (Maltese: Tal-Pietà) is a small harbour town in the Eastern Region of Malta, located near the outskirts of the capital city Valletta.

== Etymology ==
The name Tal-Pietà is derived from Italian, and means "Pity", referring to the pity of Our Lady of Sorrows. This name came about from a chapel and rectory built in 1612 dedicated to Our Lady of Sorrows.

== Description ==
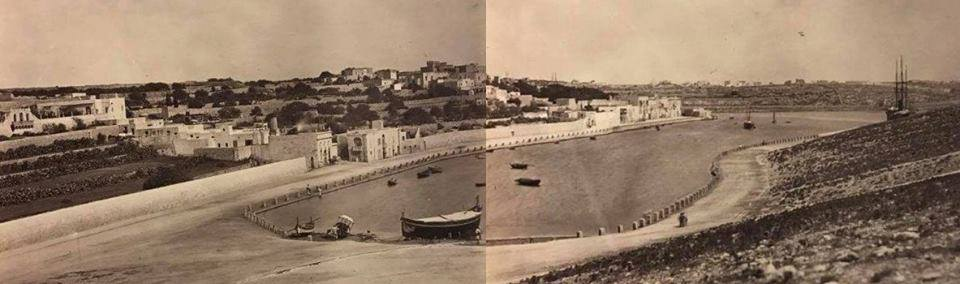
The Pietà creek in 1856-1859

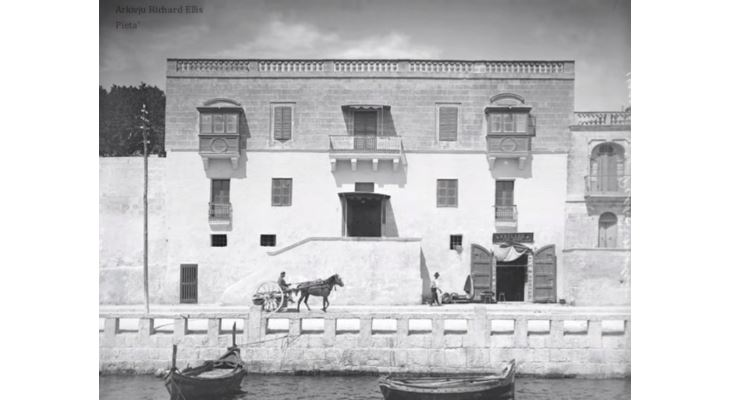
Pietà waterfront by Richard Ellis (1842-1924)

Pietà is the suburb next-closest to the capital after Floriana.

Malta's former national hospital, St. Luke's, is located in Tal-Pietà, and an old boathouse of notable historic interest, now in use as a restaurant, is located on the waterfront. The town is named after a Church of Our Lady of Sorrows dating back to the 17th and 18th centuries which is still in active use today.

A couple of streets nearby bear the names of St. Augustine and his mother, St. Monica. Tal-Pietà was a departure point for the Gozo ferry before the construction of a yacht marina. The patrol boat depot of the Armed Forces of Malta is located at the Hay Wharf in nearby Floriana. Also within the boundaries of Pietà are St. Ursula's Orphanage; PBS, the national broadcaster; Villa Guardamangia, which served as the residence of then Princess Elizabeth of Great Britain (later Queen Elizabeth II), when she lived in Malta between 1949 and 1951; the Ta' Braxia Cemetery Complex is a Commonwealth War Graves Commission site and where many World War I garrison veterans from the British army and navy are buried; and the headquarters of the Nationalist Party. The party built its base here in 1969. Tal-Pietà is regarded as a suburb of Ħamrun, Msida, Floriana and Valletta. Most of its resident population over the past 50 years hails from this area.

The population of Pietà was 3,853 in November 2005, which had been an increase over previous years due to a new housing estate and the redevelopment of old homes over the past thirty years. In March 2014 the population stood at 4,020. The population of Pietà was 7,086 in July 2024. This included 3,905 males and 3,181 females; 3,213 Maltese nationals and 3,873 foreign nationals.

A large number of Maltese citizens have Tal-Pietà as their place of birth, because many women gave birth at St. Luke's Hospital. Tal-Pietà is not, however, considered by the Maltese born there to be their home town, that being considered instead the town or city they first lived in.

=== Education ===
The secondary school campus of St. Augustine's College is located in Pietà and run by the Augustinian Order.

== Administration ==
The current Pietà local council members are:

- Keith Tanti (Mayor, PL)
- Zoya Attard (Deputy Mayor, PL)
- Anthony Camilleri (PL)
- Josef Fitzpatrick (PN)
- Annhelica Agius (PN)
- Simon Cauchi (Executive Secretary)

== Locations within Pietà ==
=== Zones in Tal-Pietà ===
- Ta' Braxia
- Xatt it-Tiben
- Sa Maison
- Gwardamanġa

=== Main roads in Tal-Pietà ===
- Misraħ San Luqa (St Luke's Square)
- Misraħ il-Madonna ta' Fátima (Our Lady of Fátima Square)
- Telghet Gwardamanġa (Gwardamanġa Hill)
- Triq ix-Xatt (Marina Street)
- Triq il-Mimosa (Mimosa Street)
- Triq San Luqa (St Luke's Road)
- Triq Santa Monika (St Monica Street)
- Triq San Guzepp (St. Joseph Street)
- Triq id-Duluri (Our Lady of Sorrows Street)
- Triq Zammit Clapp (Zammit Clapp Street)
- Triq Hookham Frere (Hookham Frere Street)
- Triq San Girgor (St Gregory Street)
- Triq is-Sorijiet tal-Ursolini (Ursoline Sisters Street)
- Sqaq Borton (Borton Lane)
