= List of monuments in Siġġiewi =

This is a list of monuments in Siġġiewi, Malta, which are listed on the National Inventory of the Cultural Property of the Maltese Islands.

== List ==
Name of object	Location	Coordinates	ID	Photo	Upload
Il-Gnien Tal-Kmand	Triq l-Imqabba c/w Triq Annabelle Vassallo	35°51′01″N 14°26′13″E	01230	Il-Gnien Tal-Kmand	Upload Photo
Inquisitors Palace and Gardens	Triq ta' Ċens Mota, Girgenti	35°51′04″N 14°24′25″E	01231	Inquisitors Palace and Gardens	Upload Photo
Old Fortified House	147 Triq il-Kbira	35°51′20″N 14°26′28″E	01232	Old Fortified House	Upload Photo
Parish Church of St Nicholas of Bari	Pjazza San Nikola c/w Triq il-Parroċċa	35°51′17″N 14°26′17″E	02106	Parish Church of St Nicholas of Bari	Upload Photo
Statue of St Nicholas	Pjazza San Nikola c/w Triq il-Kbira	35°51′13″N 14°26′19″E	02107	Statue of St Nicholas	Upload Photo
Chapel of St John the Baptist	Pjazza San Nikola c/w Triq San Ġakbu	35°51′11″N 14°26′17″E	02108	Chapel of St John the Baptist	Upload Photo
Niche of the Immaculate Conception	2 Pjazza San Nikola	35°51′13″N 14°26′20″E	02109	Niche of the Immaculate Conception	Upload Photo
Niche of St John the Evangelist	Triq San Nikola c/w Triq il-Knisja	35°51′17″N 14°26′18″E	02110	Niche of St John the Evangelist	Upload Photo
Niche of St Joseph	72 Triq San Nikola	35°51′18″N 14°26′19″E	02111	Niche of St Joseph	Upload Photo
Niche of St Nicholas	66 Triq San Nikola	35°51′19″N 14°26′19″E	02112	Niche of St Nicholas	Upload Photo
Niche of the Pieta	40/41 Triq San Nikola	35°51′20″N 14°26′18″E	02113	Niche of the Pieta	Upload Photo
Niche of St Nicholas (empty - May 2024)	47 Triq San Nikola	35°51′21″N 14°26′19″E	02114	Niche of St Nicholas (empty - May 2024)	Upload Photo
Chapel of Santa Margerita	56 Triq Santa Margerita	35°51′21″N 14°26′19″E	02115	Chapel of Santa Margerita	Upload Photo
Niche of the Immaculate Conception	53 Triq Santa Margerita	35°51′22″N 14°26′20″E	02116	Niche of the Immaculate Conception	Upload Photo
Statue of the Madonna of Lourdes	56 Triq Santa Margerita	35°51′22″N 14°26′19″E	02117		Upload Photo
Niche of the Sacred Heart of Jesus	185 Triq Santa Margerita	35°51′24″N 14°26′22″E	02118	Niche of the Sacred Heart of Jesus	Upload Photo
Niche of St Nicholas	195 Triq Santa Margerita c/w Triq ta' Brija	35°51′25″N 14°26′24″E	02119	Niche of St Nicholas	Upload Photo
Niche of the Redeemer	231 Triq Santa Margerita	35°51′30″N 14°26′31″E	02120	Niche of the Redeemer	Upload Photo
Niche of the Pieta	232 Triq Santa Margerita c/w Triq it-Tabib Nikola Zammit	35°51′31″N 14°26′31″E	02121	Niche of the Pieta	Upload Photo
Niche of St Joseph	59 Triq ta' Brija	35°51′26″N 14°26′24″E	02122	Niche of St Joseph	Upload Photo
Niche of the Madonna of Mount Carmel	83 Triq tan-Nofs	35°51′21″N 14°26′22″E	02123	Niche of the Madonna of Mount Carmel	Upload Photo
Niche of St. Anne	19 Triq tan-Nofs	35°51′20″N 14°26′22″E	02124	Niche of St. Anne	Upload Photo
Chapel of the Madonna (Ta’ Cwerra)	Pjazza San Nikola c/w Triq id-Dejqa	35°51′14″N 14°26′20″E	02125	Chapel of the Madonna (Ta’ Cwerra)	Upload Photo
Relief of St Nicholas	Triq il-Qasira c/w Triq tan-Nofs	35°51′17″N 14°26′23″E	02126		Upload Photo
Niche of St Michael	Triq il-Qasira	35°51′16″N 14°26′23″E	02127	Niche of St Michael	Upload Photo
Relief of Christ the King	19 Triq il-Qasira	35°51′17″N 14°26′24″E	02128	Relief of Christ the King	Upload Photo
Niche of St. Anthony of Padua	5 Triq il-Qasira	35°51′16″N 14°26′24″E	02129	Niche of St. Anthony of Padua	Upload Photo
Niche of St Nicholas	Sqaq tan-Nofs Nru.1	35°51′20″N 14°26′23″E	02130	Niche of St Nicholas	Upload Photo
Niche of St Gaetan	72 Triq Santa Margerita	35°51′21″N 14°26′17″E	02131	Niche of St Gaetan	Upload Photo
Niche of the Madonna of Mount Carmel	45 Triq Santa Margerita	35°51′21″N 14°26′15″E	02132	Niche of the Madonna of Mount Carmel	Upload Photo
Niche of Christ the Saviour	"Tal-Fierer", 127-128 Triq Santa Margerita	35°51′21″N 14°26′12″E	02133	Niche of Christ the Saviour	Upload Photo
Statue of St. Paul	125 Triq Santa Margerita	35°51′21″N 14°26′12″E	02134	Statue of St. Paul	Upload Photo
Relief of the Holy Family	107 Triq Santa Margerita	35°51′20″N 14°26′12″E	02135	Relief of the Holy Family	Upload Photo
Chapel of St Nicholas	Ħal Niklus	35°50′07″N 14°26′29″E	02136	Chapel of St Nicholas	Upload Photo
Church of Our Lady of Divine Providence	Trejqa tal-Providenza	35°50′31″N 14°26′06″E	02137	Church of Our Lady of Divine Providence	Upload Photo
Niche of the Pieta	Triq il-Providenza	35°50′54″N 14°26′01″E	02138	Niche of the Pieta	Upload Photo
Statue of the Sacred Heart of Jesus	5 Triq Blat il-Qamar	35°51′23″N 14°26′04″E	02139	Statue of the Sacred Heart of Jesus	Upload Photo
Relief of the Pieta	37 Triq Blat il-Qamar	35°51′22″N 14°26′02″E	02140	Relief of the Pieta	Upload Photo
Chapel of the Madonna of Mount Carmel	180 Triq Blat il-Qamar (Siġġiewi cemetery)	35°51′25″N 14°25′44″E	02141	Chapel of the Madonna of Mount Carmel	Upload Photo
Niche of the Pieta	Triq Blat il-Qamar	35°51′23″N 14°25′34″E	02142	Niche of the Pieta	Upload Photo
Niche of St Philip of Agira	Triq Blat il-Qamar	35°51′23″N 14°25′34″E	02143	Niche of St Philip of Agira	Upload Photo
Niche of the Madonna and Souls	59 Triq il-Knisja L-Qadima	35°51′07″N 14°26′15″E	02144	Niche of the Madonna and Souls	Upload Photo
Cross	59 Triq il-Knisja L-Qadima	35°51′07″N 14°26′14″E	02145	Cross	Upload Photo
Niche of St Roque	77 Triq il-Knisja L-Qadima	35°51′06″N 14°26′13″E	02146	Niche of St Roque	Upload Photo
Niche of St. Anthony of Padua	8 Triq il-Knisja L-Qadima	35°51′04″N 14°26′12″E	02147	Niche of St. Anthony of Padua	Upload Photo
Niche of the Madonna of Lourdes	24 Pjazza San Nikola c/w Triq San Ġakbu	35°51′12″N 14°26′16″E	02148	Niche of the Madonna of Lourdes	Upload Photo
Relief of the Madonna of Good Counsel	Triq il-Parroċċa c/w Triq il-Ġdida	35°51′16″N 14°26′16″E	02149	Relief of the Madonna of Good Counsel	Upload Photo
Oratory of the Holy Family	Triq il-Ġdida	35°51′16″N 14°26′15″E	02150	Oratory of the Holy Family	Upload Photo
Statue of St. Paul	Sqaq Nru. 1, Triq il-Parroċċa	35°51′18″N 14°26′09″E	02151	Statue of St. Paul	Upload Photo
Niche of the Guardian Angel	Triq il-Mitħna c/w Misraħ San Ġwann	35°51′20″N 14°26′10″E	02152	Niche of the Guardian Angel	Upload Photo
Niche of St Michael	61 Triq il-Mitħna	35°51′22″N 14°26′06″E	02153	Niche of St Michael	Upload Photo
Niche of St Joseph	Sqaq San Ġwann Nru. 2	35°51′18″N 14°26′09″E	02154	Niche of St Joseph	Upload Photo
Relief of the Sacred Heart of Jesus	"Id-Dar Tan-Nanna", 49 Triq San Ġwann	35°51′15″N 14°26′06″E	02155	Relief of the Sacred Heart of Jesus	Upload Photo
Niche of St James	Palazz tal-Mażinetta, Triq San Ġakbu	35°51′13″N 14°26′08″E	02156	Niche of St James	Upload Photo
Niche of St Paul	37 Triq San Ġakbu	35°51′13″N 14°26′11″E	02157	Niche of St Paul	Upload Photo
Statue of the Madonna of Mount Carmel	87 Triq San Ġakbu c/w Sqaq San Ġakbu Nru. 3	35°51′13″N 14°26′11″E	02158	Statue of the Madonna of Mount Carmel	Upload Photo
Statue of the Immaculate Conception	87 Triq San Ġakbu c/w Triq il-Ġdida	35°51′13″N 14°26′11″E	02159	Statue of the Immaculate Conception	Upload Photo
Niche of the Redeemer	7 Sqaq San Ġakbu Nru. 3	35°51′14″N 14°26′11″E	02160	Niche of the Redeemer	Upload Photo
Niche of St Joseph	31 Triq il-Ġdida	35°51′13″N 14°26′12″E	02161	Niche of St Joseph	Upload Photo
Niche of St Roque	Triq tal-Girgenti (?)		02162	Niche of St Roque	Upload Photo
Niche of the Madonna of Mount Carmel	Limiti tal-Għajn il-Kbira	35°51′20″N 14°24′42″E	02163		Upload Photo
Niche of the Pieta			02164		Upload Photo
Church of the Annunciation	Mogħdija tal-Għolja	35°51′00″N 14°25′00″E	02165	Church of the Annunciation	Upload Photo
Laferla Cross	L-Għolja tas-Salib	35°51′01″N 14°25′00″E	02166	Laferla Cross	Upload Photo
Niche of Santu Kristu	Triq Santu Kristu tal-Għolja	35°51′03″N 14°25′06″E	02167	Niche of Santu Kristu	Upload Photo
Statue of the Ecce Homo	Triq Santu Kristu tal-Għolja	35°51′02″N 14°25′09″E	02168	Statue of the Ecce Homo	Upload Photo
Statue of Christ tied to a column	Triq Santu Kristu tal-Għolja	35°51′01″N 14°25′12″E	02169	Statue of Christ tied to a column	Upload Photo
Niche of the Pieta	Triq Santu Kristu tal-Għolja	35°51′03″N 14°25′16″E	02170	Niche of the Pieta	Upload Photo
Statue of Christ in the Olive Garden	Triq Santu Kristu tal-Għolja	35°51′03″N 14°25′16″E	02171	Statue of Christ in the Olive Garden	Upload Photo
Church of St Lawrence	Triq San Lawrenz tal-Għolja	35°50′53″N 14°24′55″E	02172		Upload Photo
Niche of the Pieta	Triq L-Imqabba	35°51′01″N 14°26′37″E	02173	Niche of the Pieta	Upload Photo
Niche of St Agatha	Triq L-Imqabba	35°51′00″N 14°26′42″E	02174	Niche of St Agatha	Upload Photo
Chapel of St Blase	Triq it-Tiġrija	35°51′58″N 14°25′00″E	02175	Chapel of St Blase	Upload Photo
Niche of the Assumption	74 Triq il-Kbira	35°51′14″N 14°26′23″E	02176	Niche of the Assumption	Upload Photo
Niche of St. Publius	114 Triq il-Kbira	35°51′15″N 14°26′23″E	02177	Niche of St. Publius	Upload Photo
Niche of the Madonna of Mount Carmel	45/46 Triq il-Kbira	35°51′18″N 14°26′26″E	02178	Niche of the Madonna of Mount Carmel	Upload Photo
Church of St Mark	23 Triq il-Kbira c/w Sqaq il-Kbira Nru. 2	35°51′21″N 14°26′29″E	02179	Church of St Mark	Upload Photo
Statue of the Ecce Homo	Triq ta' Brija	35°51′23″N 14°26′32″E	02180		Upload Photo
Niche of the Sacred Heart of Jesus (with a statue of Sacred Heart of Holy Mary)	43 Triq Lapsi	35°51′02″N 14°26′09″E	02181	Niche of the Sacred Heart of Jesus (with a statue of Sacred Heart of Holy Mary)	Upload Photo
Chapel of the Annunciation	Ta' Ġebel Ciantar, Fawwara	35°50′24″N 14°24′35″E	02182		Upload Photo
Chapel of the Madonna of Mount Carmel	Ta' Ġebel Ciantar, Fawwara	35°50′26″N 14°24′08″E	02183	Chapel of the Madonna of Mount Carmel	Upload Photo
Niche of the Immaculate Conception	Triq Bur it-Tokk	35°50′50″N 14°26′44″E	02184		Upload Photo
Church of the Assumption at Ħax-Xluq	Triq Bur it-Tokk	35°50′49″N 14°26′43″E	02185	Church of the Assumption at Ħax-Xluq	Upload Photo
Statue of the Assumption	Ta' Ħal-Xluq	35°50′44″N 14°26′36″E	02186		Upload Photo
Chapel of San Carlo Borromeo	Triq ta' Ċens Mota, Girgenti	35°51′05″N 14°24′24″E	02187	Chapel of San Carlo Borromeo	Upload Photo
Niche of the Souls in Purgatory	Triq il-Fawwara c/w Triq Santu Kristu tal-Għolja	35°51′03″N 14°25′30″E	02188	Niche of the Souls in Purgatory	Upload Photo
Statue of Our Lady of Sorrows	Triq Santu Kristu tal-Għolja	35°51′04″N 14°25′31″E	02189	Statue of Our Lady of Sorrows	Upload Photo
