= Għar il-Kbir =

Cave system in Malta

- "The big cave"
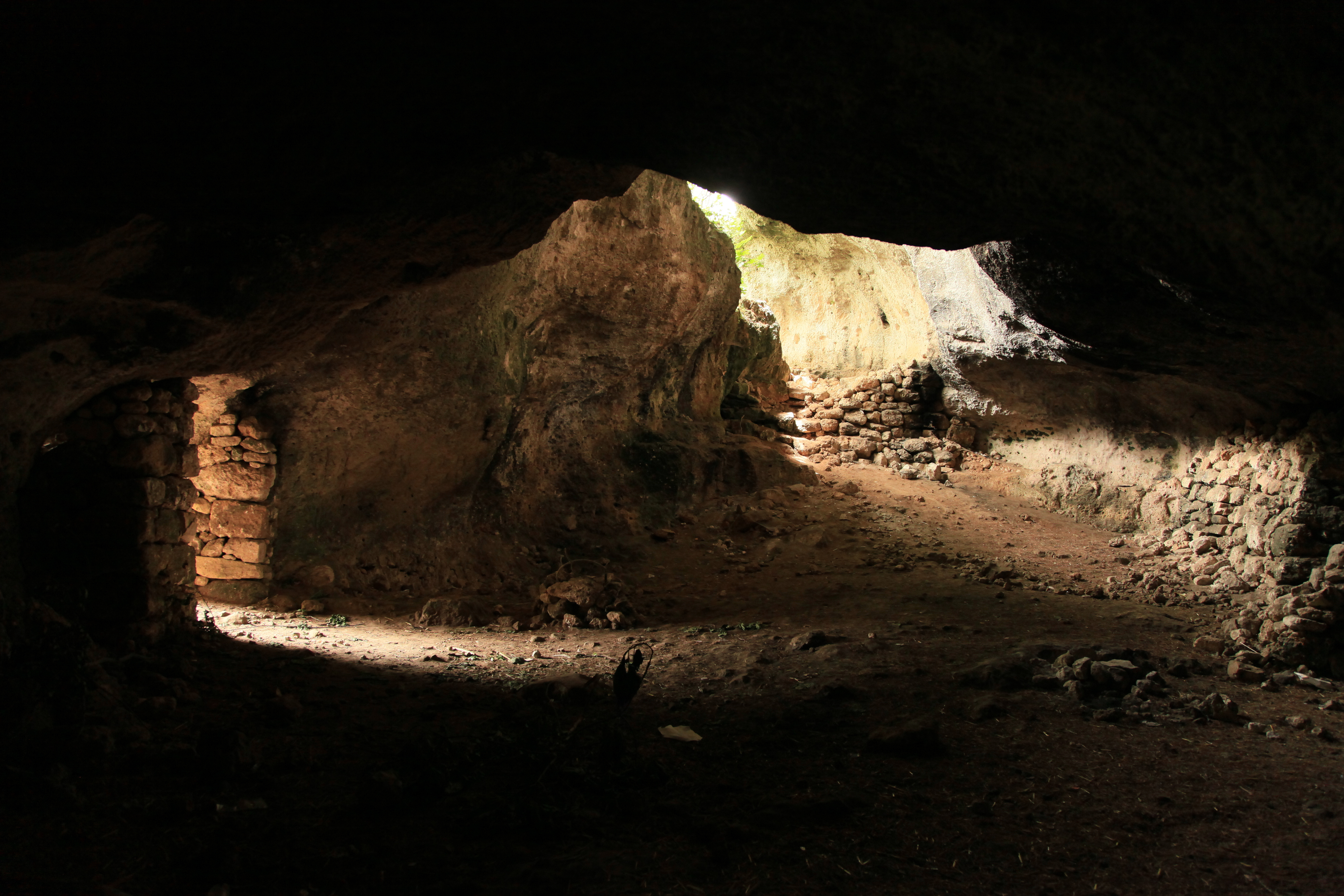
- The largest cave within the cave system

- Location within Malta
- Coordinates: 35°51′4″N 14°23′48″E
- Elevation: 750 feet (230 m)
- Lighting: None (Natural Sunlight)
- Features: 8 caves spread across two levels

Għar il-Kbir (English: Literally: "The big cave") is a complex of rock-cut structures in Siggiewi, Malta. The structures, which were most likely originally small limestone caves, are primarily known for several cart ruts which are located next to it. It is also commonly believed that several families of troglodytes inhabited the cave until 1835. The general structure of the cave system has eight caves spread across two levels.

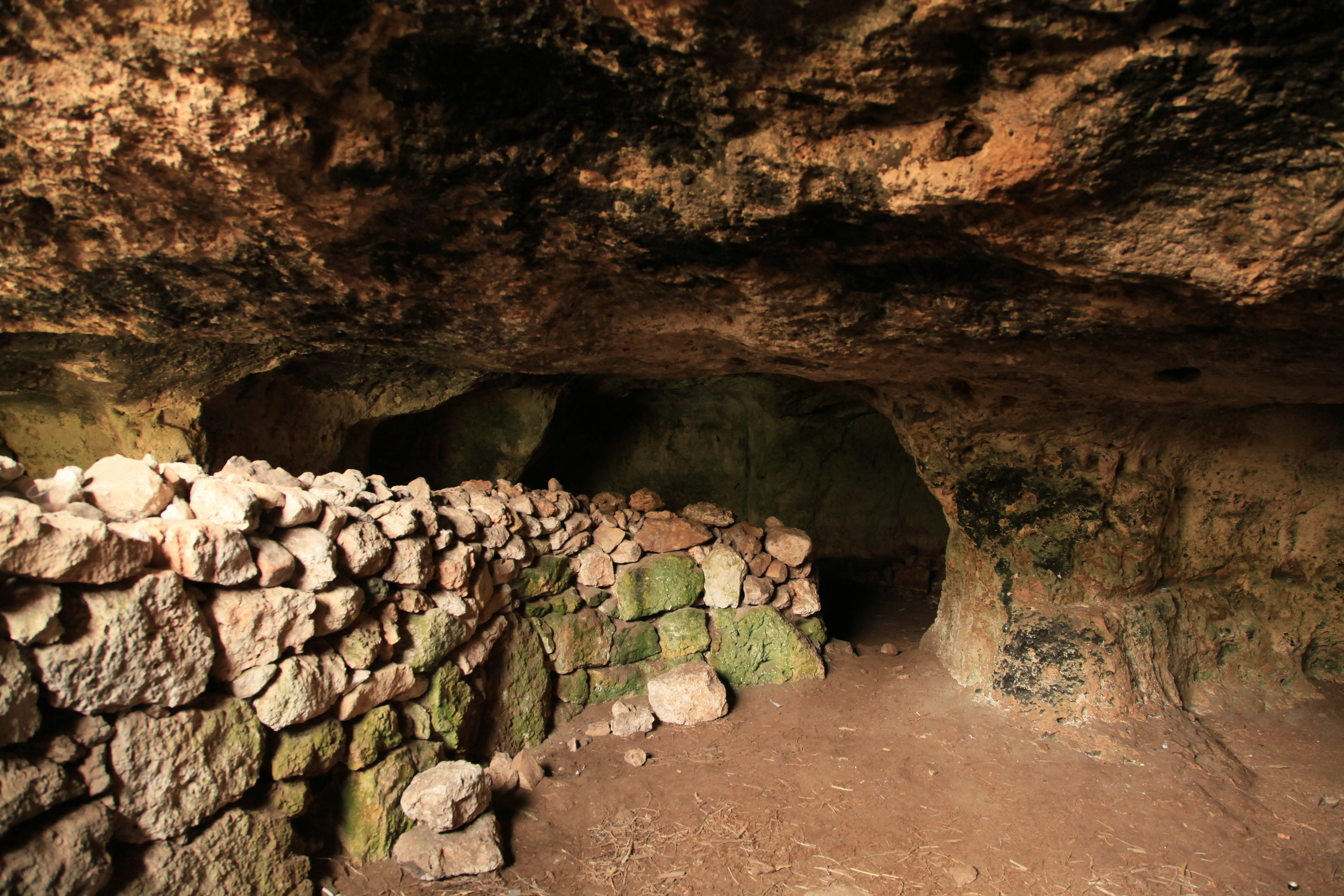
The second-largest cave within the cave system.
