= Pawlu Aquilina =

Maltese poet and writer

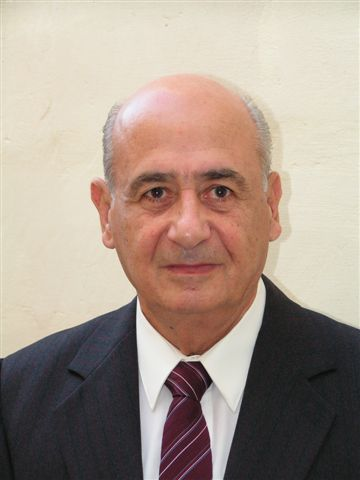
- Born: August 28, 1929; Siġġiewi, Malta
- Died: January 29, 2009 (aged 79); Mater Dei Hospital, Birkirkara, Malta
- Occupations: Headmaster, Poet, Writer

Pawlu Aquilina (August 28, 1929 – January 29, 2009) was a Maltese poet and writer from Siġġiewi, Malta. He studied at the Archbishop's Seminary and St Michael's Training College for Teachers.

In 1950 Aquilina started his teaching career in the Maltese Government Primary Schools until 1957 when he was appointed scriptwriter with the Department of Information - Education Broadcasting Section. In 1959 he was appointed Master of Maltese at The Lyceum. In 1978 he became assistant headmaster and in 1986 was appointed headmaster. He retired in 1990.

Aquilina wrote various poems and essays, radio features and many educational broadcasts for school children. On request from the Jesuit provincial, the poet Fr Ġuże Delia S.J., he translated the historical-religious verse drama El Divino Impaciente from the English version 'A Saint in a Hurry' of the well known Spanish poet and writer José María Pemán. Other translation works: "St Vincent de Paule's Residence for the Elderly - The medico-social record", by Dr Paul Cassar, MD.BSc (Lond)., FRHist.S.(Lond)D.Litt.(Hon. Causa)(1994); "Il-ħobż Malti - Is-Sengħa tal-Furnar" by Monsieur Hubert Chiron (1994); "A Guide to the Passion - 100 Questions About the Passion of The Christ" by the Directors of Catholic Exchange" (2004).

Co-Edited with Ġużè Diacono the revised edition of the English - Maltese Dictionary (5 volumes) by Dun Karm Psaila; (1991–1993).

In 1992 he published a selection of his poems in one volume Mill-Beraħ ta' l-Għelieqi. He won various literature contests.

Aquilina died in Malta on 29 January 2009.

== Major works ==
- Mill-Beraħ ta' l-Għelieqi. A collection of poems written by the poet between 1946 and 1991. Forward study by Professor Oliver Friggieri. Published in 1992 by Publishers Enterprises Group (PEG) Limited and sponsored by Tug Malta Limited.
- L-Għanja Tiegħi lil Ħal Xluq. Published in 2002.
- Hawn Twieldet u Tibqa' Tħabbat Qalbi. A collection of writings about his home town Siġġiewi. Forward study by Professor Mario Vassallo of the Department of Sociology, University of Malta. Published in 2004 by the Siġġiewi Local Council and sponsored by Philip Agius & Sons Ltd.
- Erġa' Semmagħli l-Għanja - published in 2006. A second collection of poems. The book is sponsored and published by JM Vassallo Vibro Blocks Limited. Profits from this book will go to Dar Tal-Providenza, a non-profit charitable home for children with diverse impairments.
- L-Għanja Tiegħi lil Ħal Kbir - 2008
- Is-Siġġiewi u t-Toroq Tiegħu - 2009, Published by Siġġiewi Local Council
