= St Blaise's Chapel, Siġġiewi =

St Blaise's Chapel
- The Chapel of St Blaise
- Il-Kappella ta San Blas
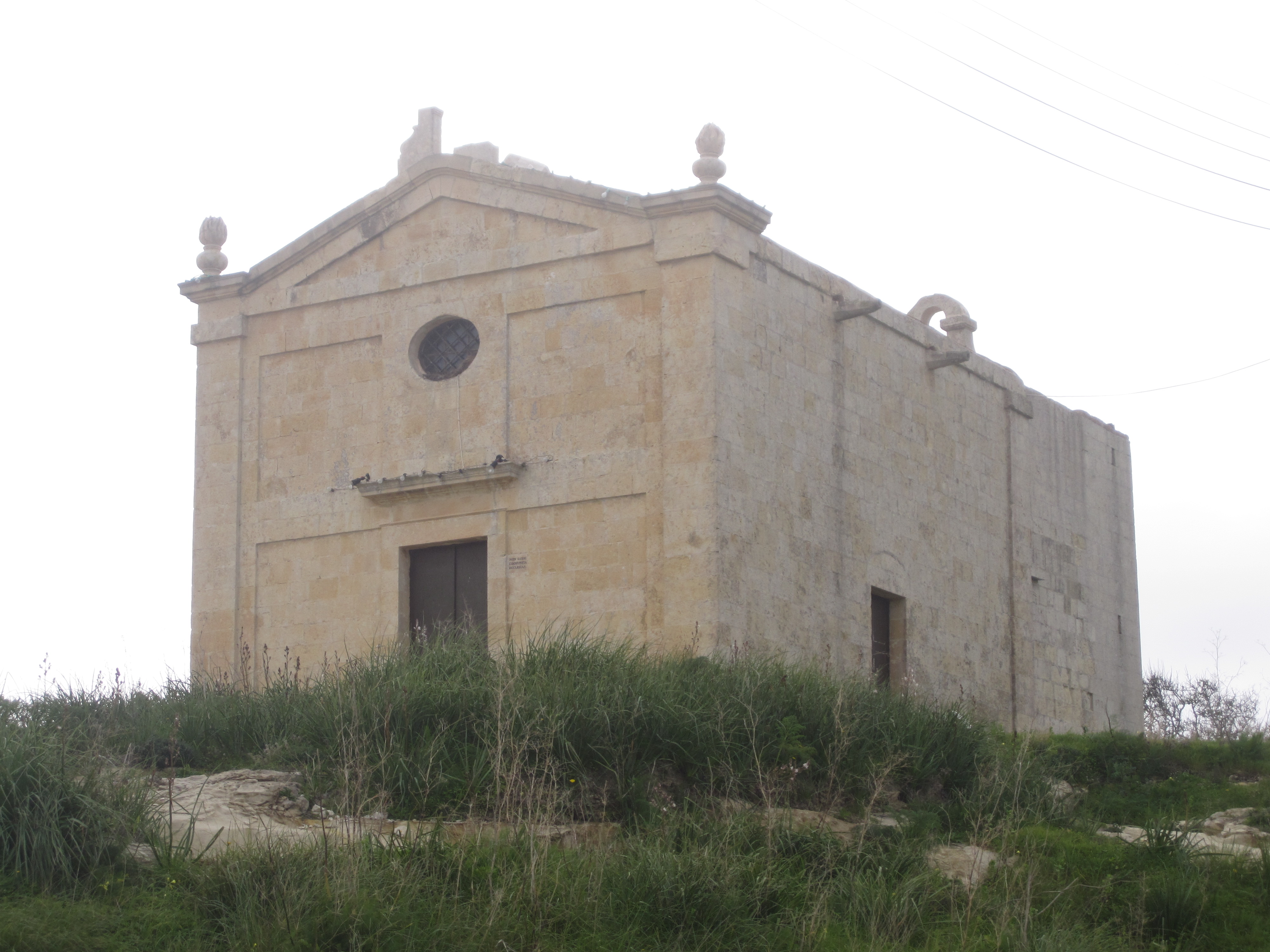

- Location within Malta
- 35°51′58.5″N 14°24′59.9″E
- Location: Siġġiewi
- Country: Malta
- Denomination: Roman Catholic

History
- Founded: 1430
- Dedication: Saint Blaise

Architecture
- Functional status: Church
- Completed: 1691

Administration
- Archdiocese: Malta

Clergy
- Archbishop: Charles Scicluna

St Blaise's Chapel is a wayside chapel located in the countryside between the villages of Siġġiewi and Rabat. The chapel is governed by the Metropolitan Cathedral of St Paul in Mdina.

== Origins ==
The first chapel on the site was built in the late Middle Ages in 1430. Unlike most churches in Malta, this chapel was not mentioned in inquisitor Pietro Dusina's report of 1575 during his apostolic visit to Malta. This may be because the chapel had been destroyed by that time; however, it was mentioned that a certain Canon Treasurer of the cathedral had the Prebendary of St Blaise.

The present chapel was built in 1691 through the initiatives of the Reverend Canon Antonio Manso who at that time had the Prebendary of St Blaise. A plaque inside the chapel mentions the event of the reconstruction and mentions the bishop of Malta Davide Cocco Palmieri and the Grand Master Gregorio Carafa.

== Interior ==
The chapel is built in a rectangular form with five arches holding the ceiling. The chapel has one stone altar and a painting depicting Saint Blaise. The original painting is the work of Giuseppe D'Arena; however, it was removed and is kept in the Cathedral Museum due to security reasons. On top of the painting one can see two stone angels holding an inscription.
