= Church of St Nicholas, Siġġiewi =

Parish Church of St Nicholas of Myra
- Knisja Arċipretali ta' San Nikola
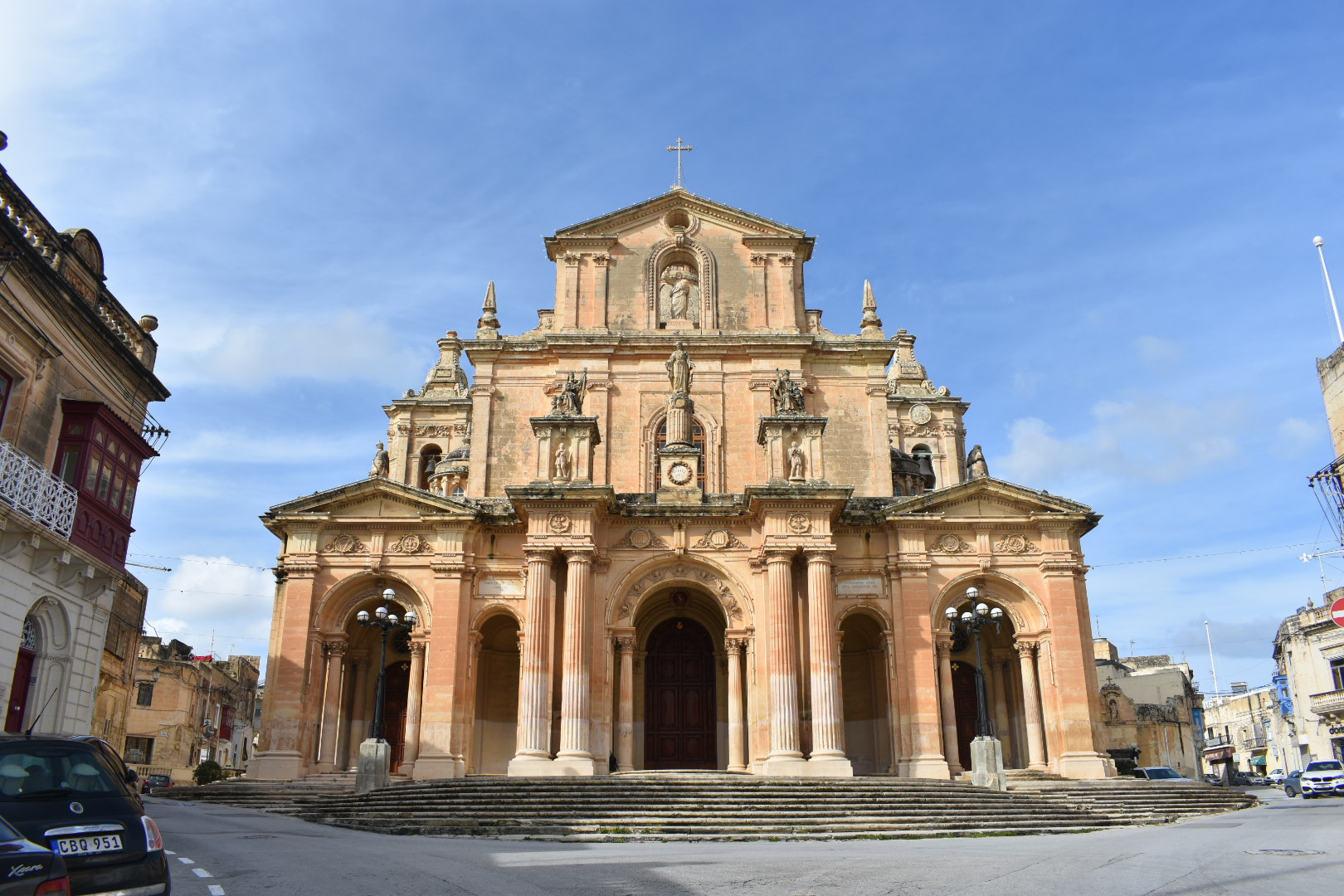
- Church of St Nicholas
- Parish Church of St Nicholas of Myra
- 35.8546°N 14.4381°E
- Location: Siġġiewi, Malta
- Denomination: Roman Catholic
- Website: Website of the Church

History
- Status: Active
- Founded: 1675
- Dedication: Saint Nicholas
- Dedicated: 10 May 1729

Architecture
- Functional status: Parish church
- Architect: Lorenzo Gafà
- Architectural type: Church
- Style: Baroque

Specifications
- Materials: Limestone

Administration
- Archdiocese: Malta
- Parish: Siġġiewi

Clergy
- Archbishop: Charles Scicluna

The Church of St Nicholas is the Roman Catholic parish church of Siġġiewi, Malta, dedicated to Nicholas of Bari. It was built in the late 17th century and it took over the function of an older parish church which was located elsewhere in the village and which now lies in ruins.

== Original church ==
Siġġiewi was listed as one of Malta's first parishes by Bishop Senatore de Mello in his rollo of 1436. The old parish church was located in another part of the village, and it was built and enlarged gradually between the 15th and early 17th centuries. The building was abandoned and partially demolished after the present parish church was built, but some ruins still stand and they were classified as a heritage site in 1998 and were restored in 2007.

== Present church ==
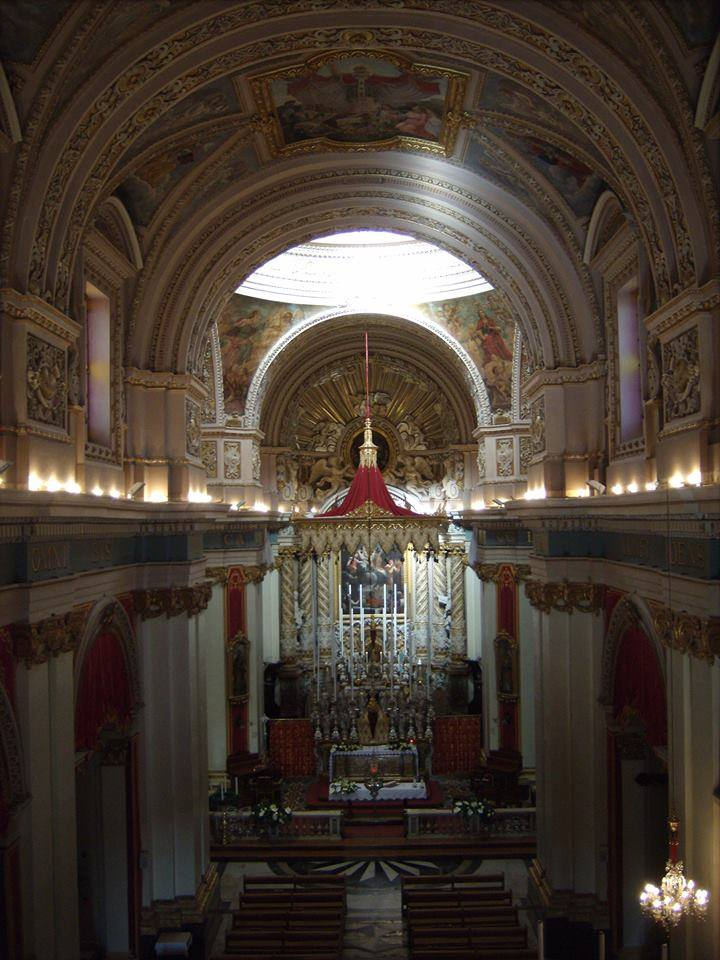
Interior of the church

The present church of St Nicholas was built between 1675 and 1693. The church was consecrated on May 10, 1729. In 1862 the church was enlarged on the plans of Nikol Zammit. The side aisles, dome and portico were added. Every June the annual feast of Saint Nicholas is celebrated with great solemnity while on December 6 the liturgical feast of the saint is celebrated.

The titular painting in the church is by the artist Mattia Preti, 'Il calabrese', who was also responsible for the painting on the vault of St John's Co-Cathedral in Valletta. The wooden statue which is carried in procession in the city feast day (the last Sunday of June) was sculptured by Pietro Felici in 1736. Fours years earlier, in 1732, the same sculptor had produced the stone statue which still stands in the centre of the square. On its pedestal there is a prayer in Latin which implores the saint to bless the fields which the faithful laboriously till.

The church is listed on the National Inventory of the Cultural Property of the Maltese Islands.

== See also ==
- Culture of Malta
- History of Malta
- List of Churches in Malta
- Religion in Malta
