= Girgenti Palace =

- Palazz tal-Girgenti
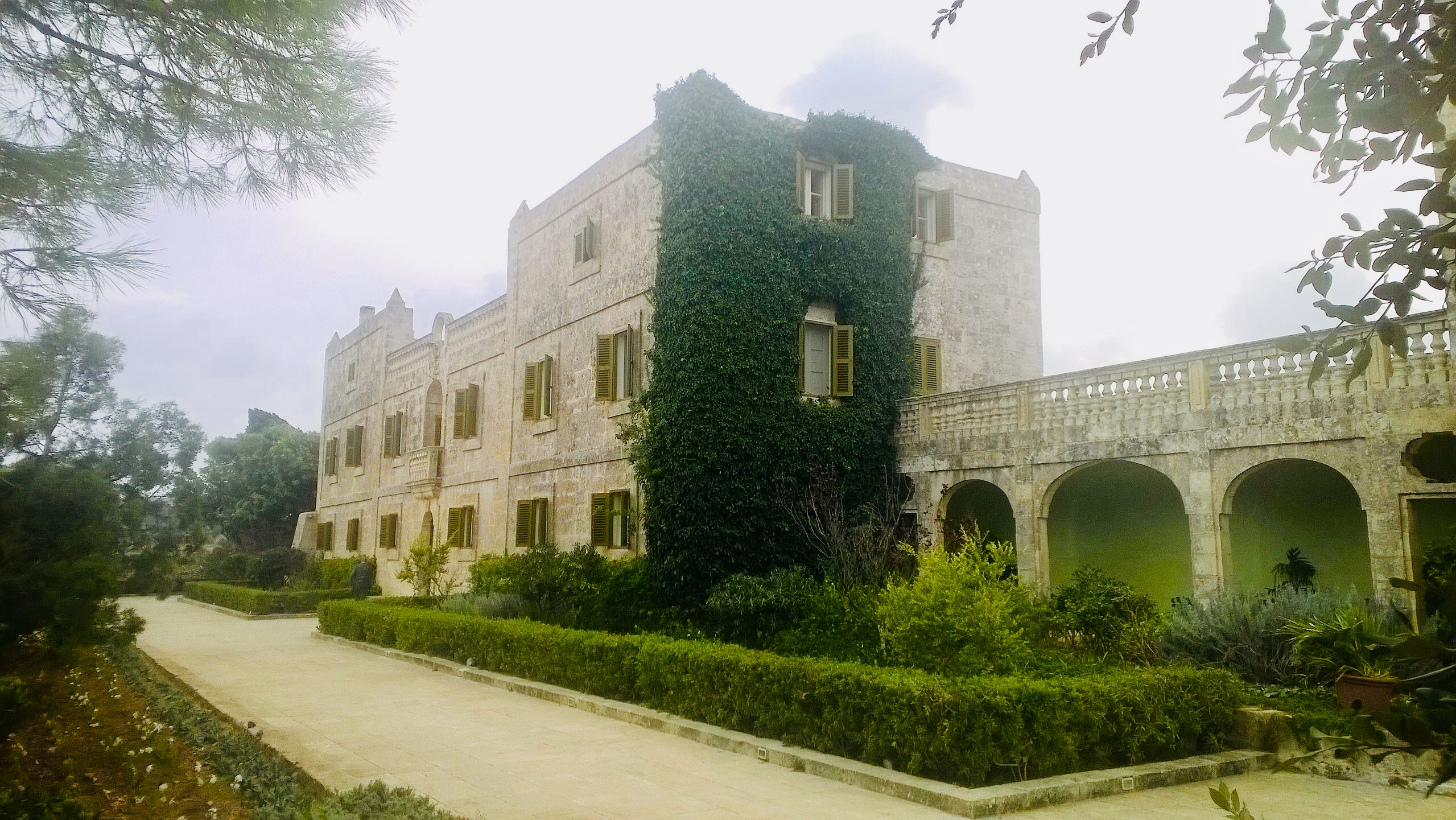
- View of the palace
- Interactive map of the Girgenti Palace area
- Alternative names: Inquisitor's Palace and gardens

General information
- Status: Intact
- Type: Palace
- Location: Siġġiewi, Malta
- Coordinates: 35°51′4.2″N 14°24′24.6″E
- Current tenants: Prime Minister of Malta
- Completed: 1625
- Owner: Government of Malta

Technical details
- Material: Limestone

Girgenti Palace (Maltese: Palazz tal-Girgenti) is a palace near Siġġiewi, Malta. It was built in 1625 as the summer residence of Malta's inquisitor, and is therefore also known as the Inquisitor's Palace (Maltese: Palazz tal-Inkwiżitur). It is now an official residence of the Prime Minister of Malta.

== History ==
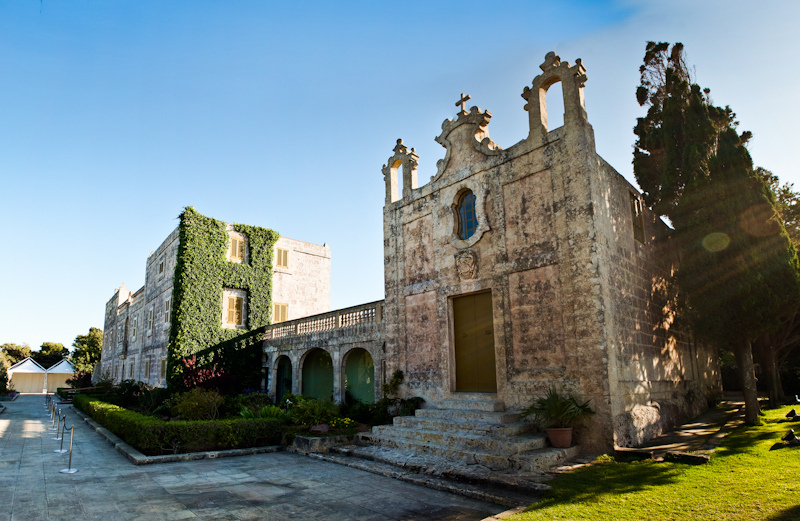
The St. Charles Borromeo Chapel, next to the palace

Girgenti Palace was built in 1625 as the summer residence of Inquisitor Onorato Visconti, on a strip of land confiscated from Matteo Falzon (Maltese: Matti Falzun), who had been condemned as a heretic. Falzon was not accused alone as also Cleric Wenzu Falzon had been accused with him of witchcraft. Wenzu self-exiled in France where he continued a life against church teaching and Matteo went into hiding in Sicily. Both were sentenced in absentia by the inquisition with representative ‘corps’. No property was taken from Wenzu as he had nothing of real value left behind. Matteo remained known by the locals as the "Falzon Wizard" (Maltese: is-Saħħar Falzun).

A chapel dedicated to St Charles Borromeo was built near the palace in 1763 by Inquisitor Angelo Maria Durini.

The palace was included on the Antiquities List of 1925.

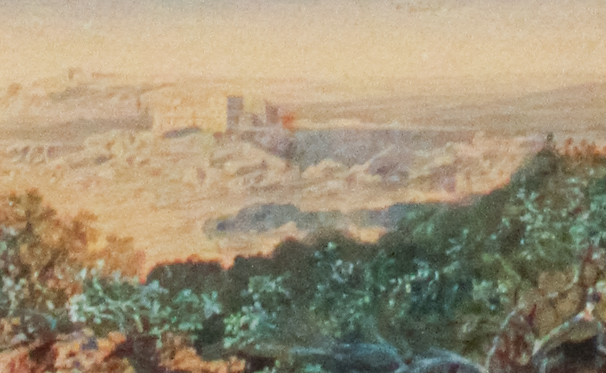
19th century painting of the palace by Edward Lear

The palace remained the summer residence of the inquisitors until 1798, when the Inquisition was abolished during the French occupation of Malta. It was subsequently used as a summer residence for the Lieutenant-Governors of Malta. In World War II, some of the collections of the Palace Armoury were stored at Girgenti Palace for safekeeping.

The palace was left abandoned until it was restored between 1988 and 1990, and converted into the summer residence of the Prime Minister of Malta.

== Present day ==
The palace is occasionally open to the public.

Both the palace and chapel are listed on the National Inventory of the Cultural Property of the Maltese Islands.

== Design ==
The palace has a simple layout, with its rooms arranged in a rectilinear layout. It has a plain façade, with few decorative elements.
