= Laferla Cross =

Coordinates: 35.8502°N 14.4166°E

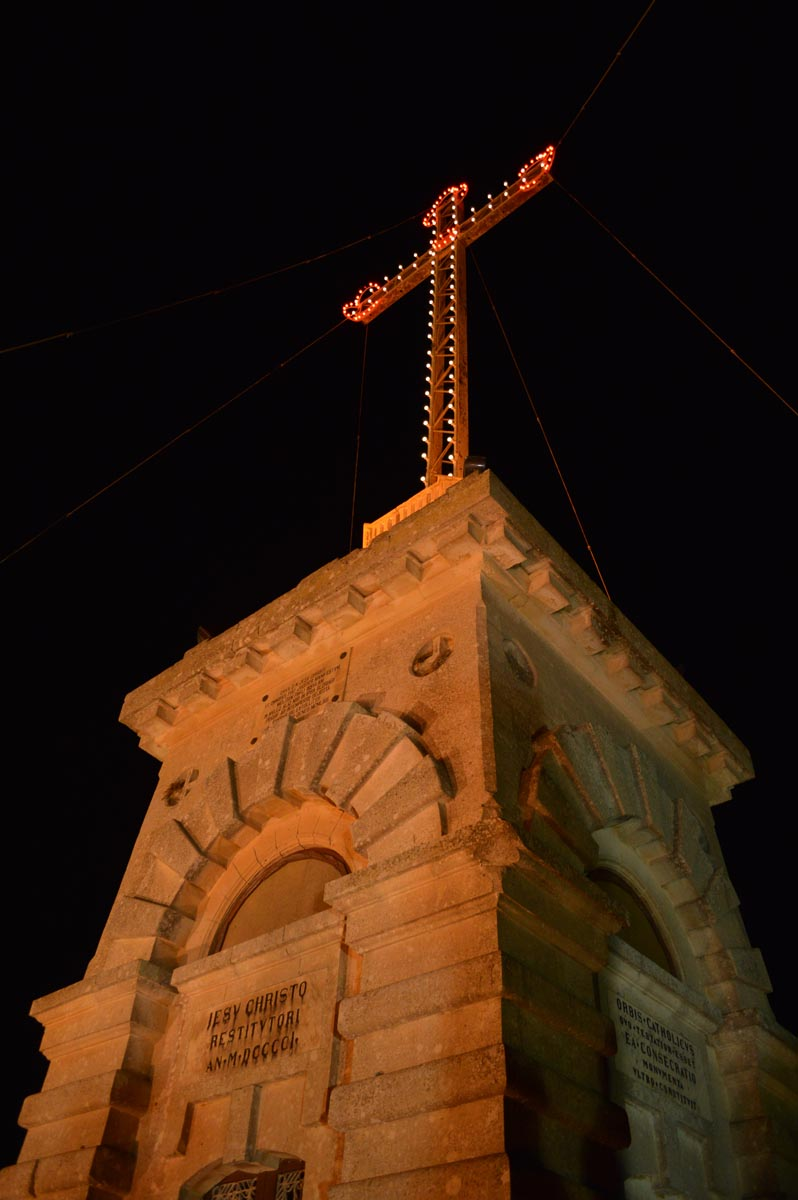
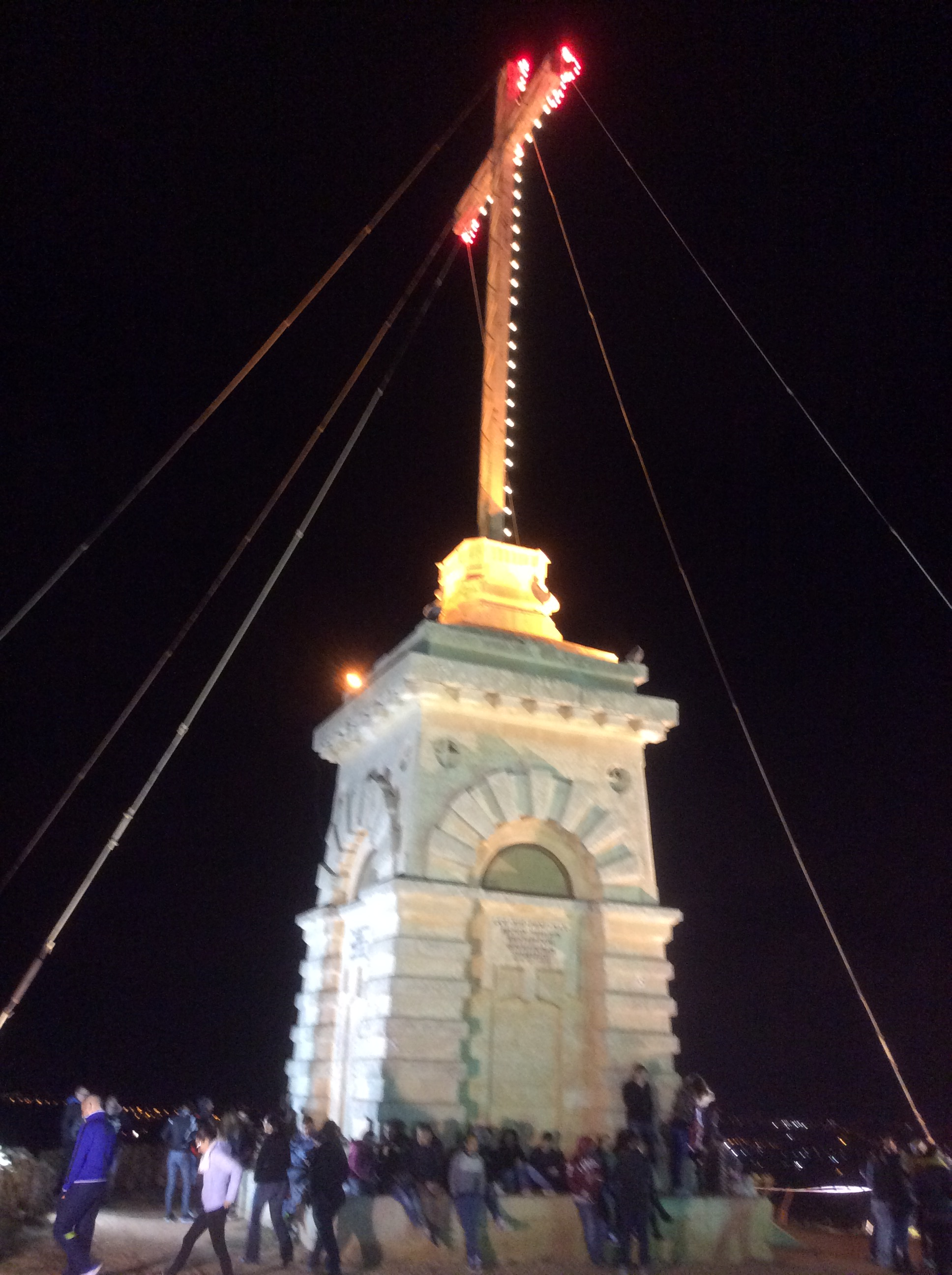
Front and back views of the Laferla Cross and shrine.

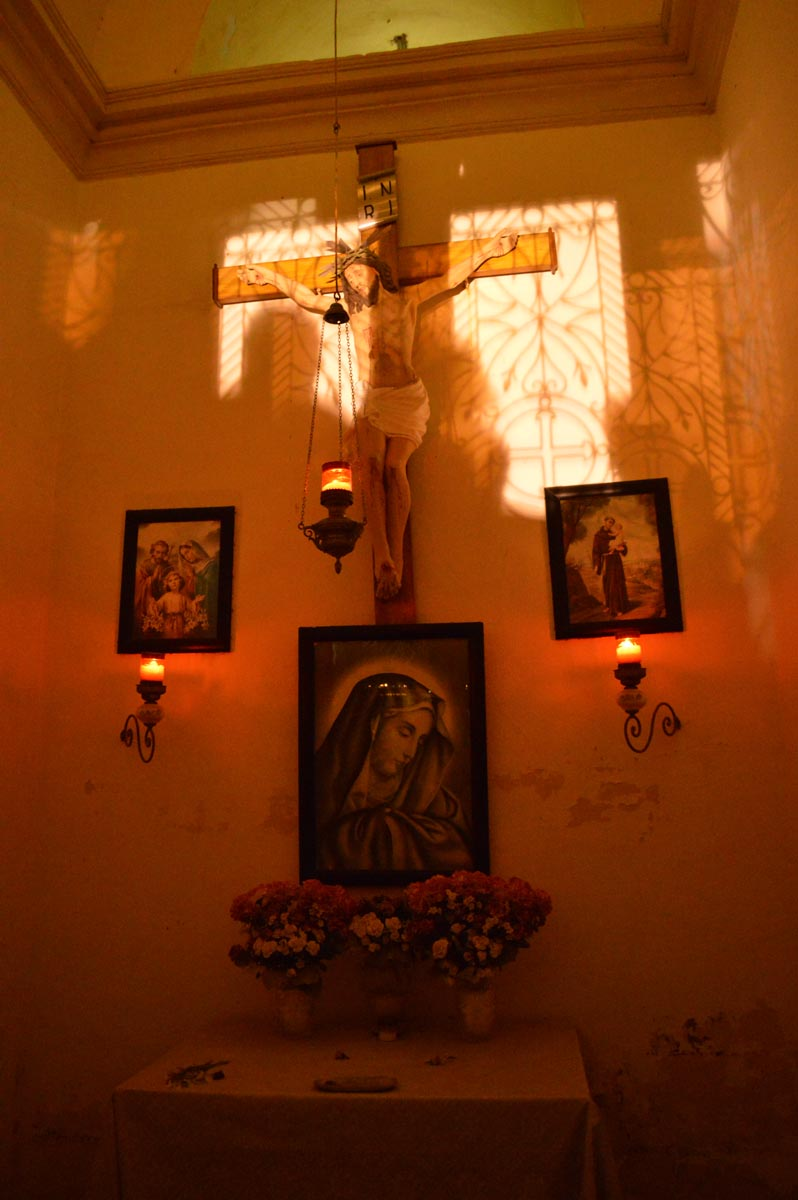
LaFerlaCrossPix011

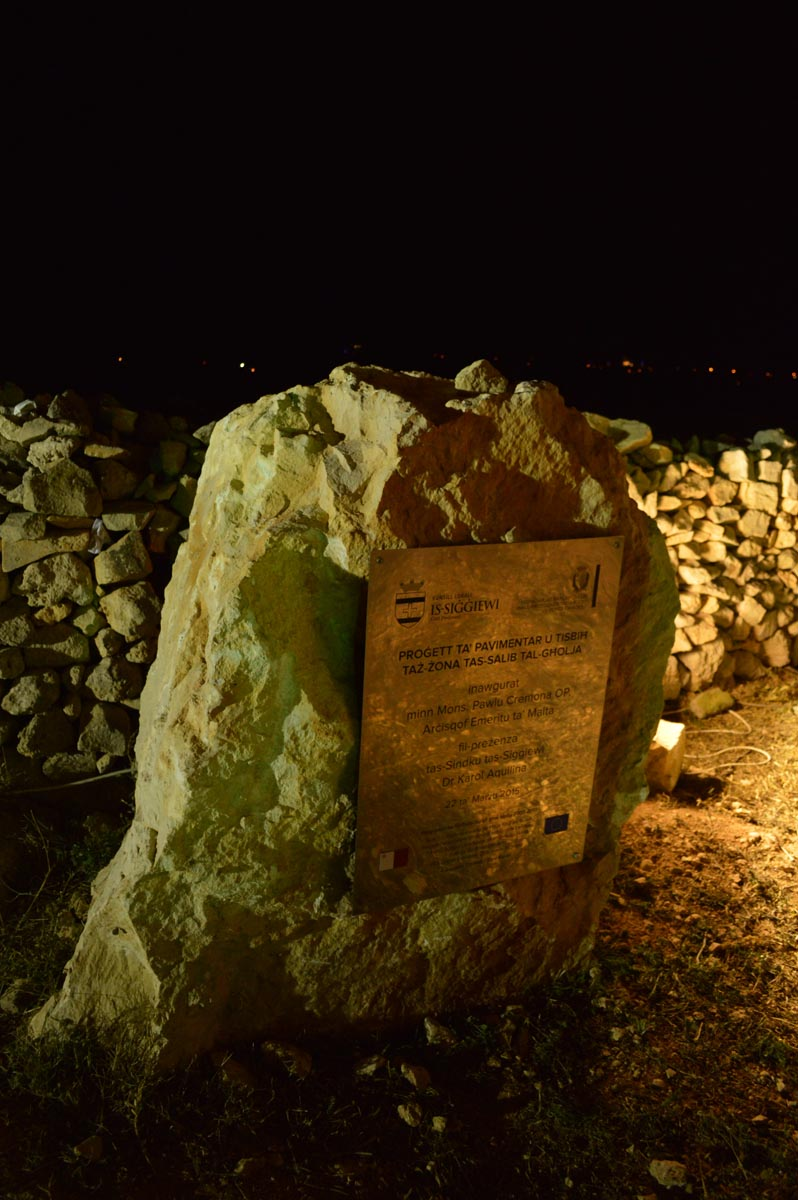
LaFerlaCrossPix012

The Laferla Cross (Maltese: is-Salib tal-Għolja) is an early 20th-century religious landmark on the outskirts of Siġġiewi, in Malta. It is situated on a hill close to the Chapel of the Annunciation and the Cemetery of Saint Theodore.

== History ==
The original Laferla Cross was built under the supervision of Ġanni Mercieca in 1903. It was named after Fr. Paul Laferla, who proposed its construction as a memorial of the Holy Year. A year after its construction, the cross was blessed by the Archbishop and an art painting of Our Lady of Sorrows was placed within the shrine. The cross was restored on number of times generally due to damage and degradation but it has at times collapsed. The 1903 Laferla Cross was replaced with a 1963 Italian replica reinforced in bronze and iron. Threatened by erosion and in danger of collapse the cross was restored by locals craftsmen in 1984. The pathway leading to the Cross was included as part of the EU’s Rural Development Programme for Malta in 2014 to rehabilitate the environment around the landmark by paving of the area surrounding the cross and the pathway behind it to improve accessibility and attract more visitors.

== Cultural tradition ==
The Laferla Cross is closely linked to Catholic cultural traditions and constitutes a yearly meeting point for Maltese pilgrims during the night on Maundy Thursday and Good Friday. Since 1994, the steep hill leading to the Cross has been illuminated with torches and candlelight during this celebration, forming a pathway originating from statues of Jesus symbolizing his final hours before crucifixion. The pilgrimage is taken in a spirit of worship and silence, and some devout Catholics choose to walk the steep hill on bare feet.

== Details ==
The Laferla Cross stands over a limestone shrine hosting a small rudimentary altar, and three paintings of varying sizes, the largest of which representing a solemn Virgin. A crucifix hangs on the interior's central wall. On the outside, various Latin inscriptions referencing the year of construction and dedications can be read on each side of the monument.

"CRVX D.N. JESV CHRISTI
VT OMNIBVS FIAT JVGITER MANIFESTVM
MELITAM PAULI INSVLAM
IN NVLLO ALIO NISI IN IPSA GLORIARI
PRIORE AB INTEMPERIIS DEJECTA RVRSUS HIC EXTOLLITVR"

Inscriptions on the shrine of the Laferla Cross
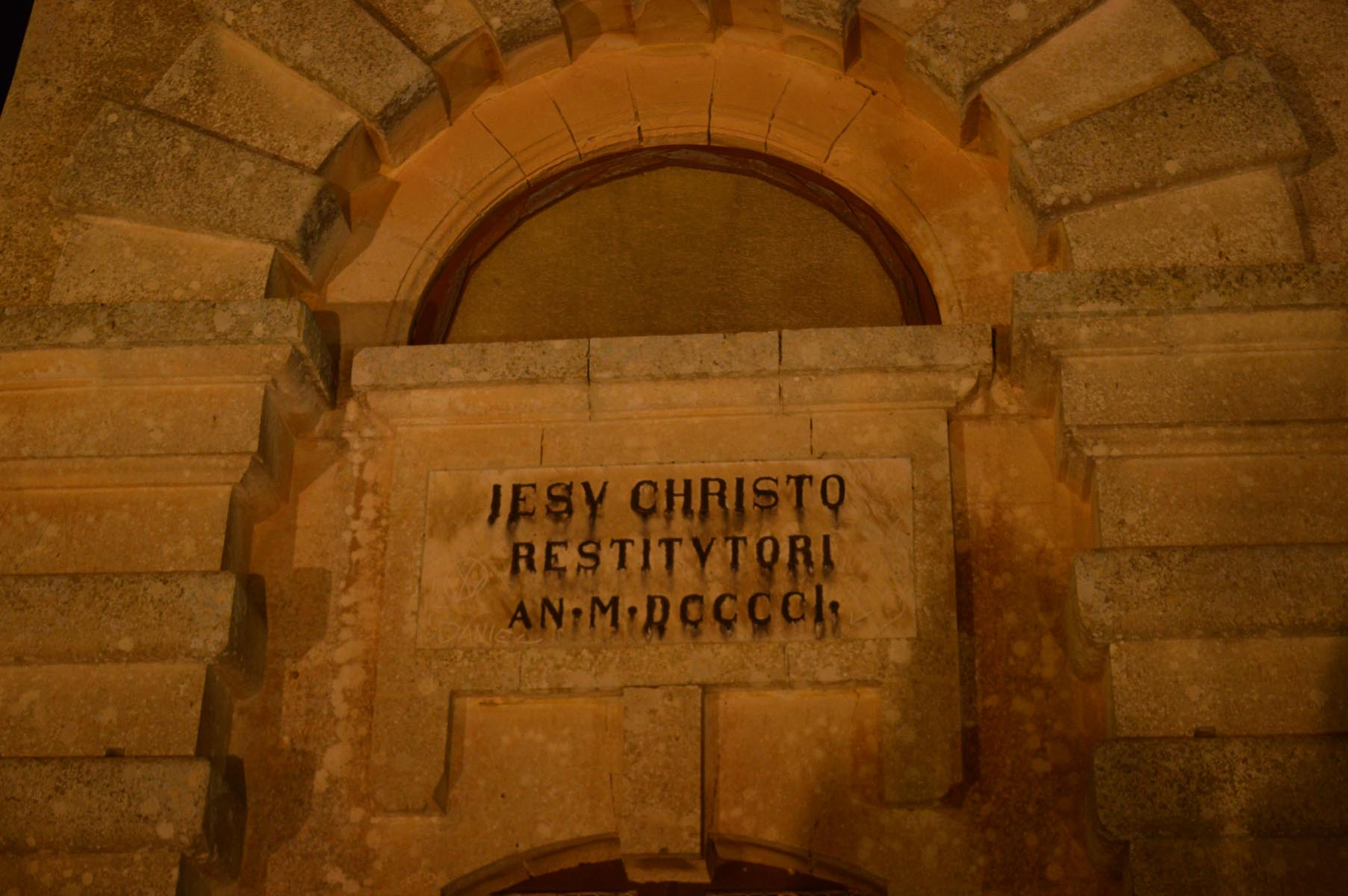
Inscription on the front side of the Laferla Cross shrine.

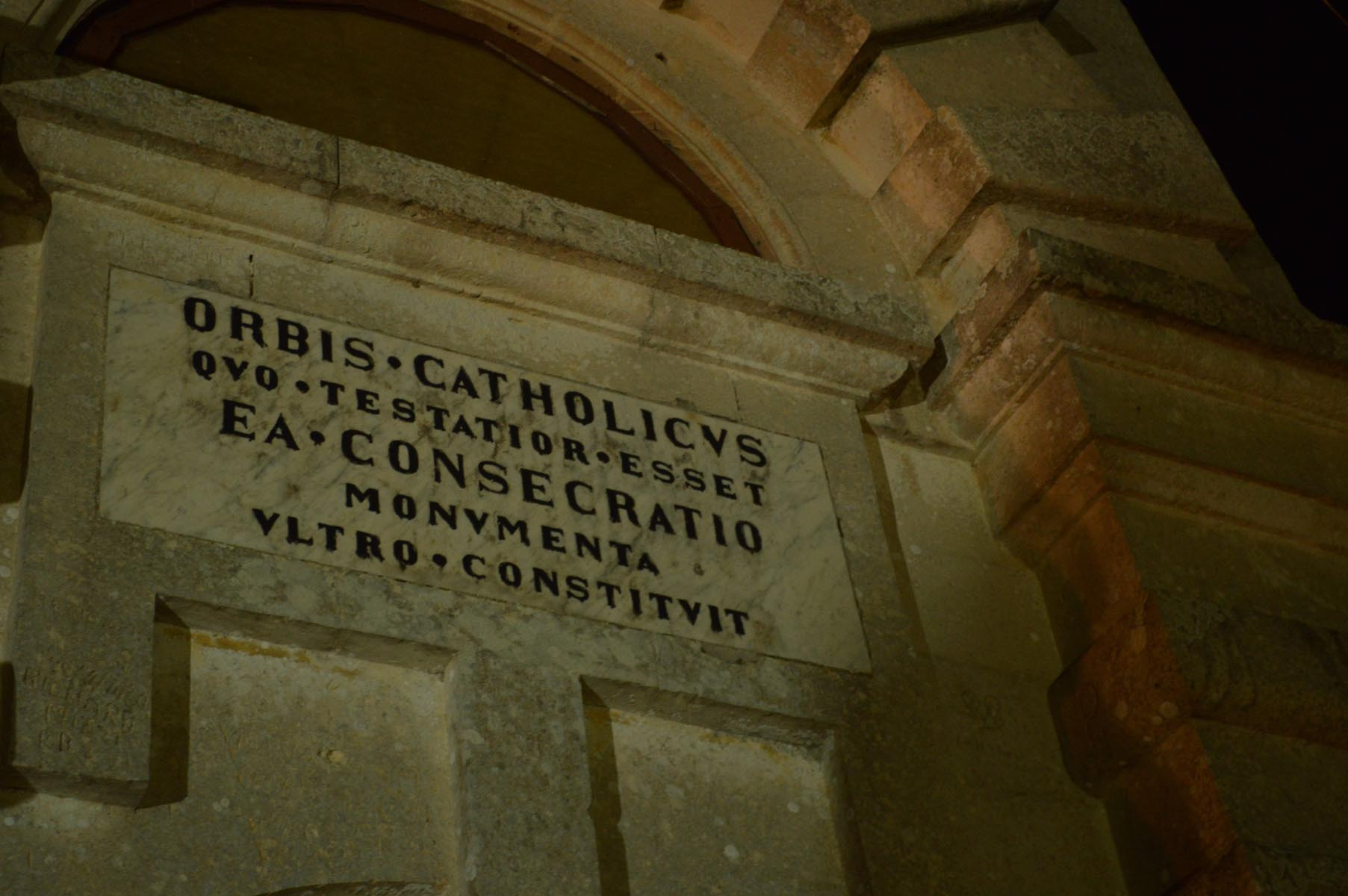
Inscription on the left side of the Laferla Cross shrine.

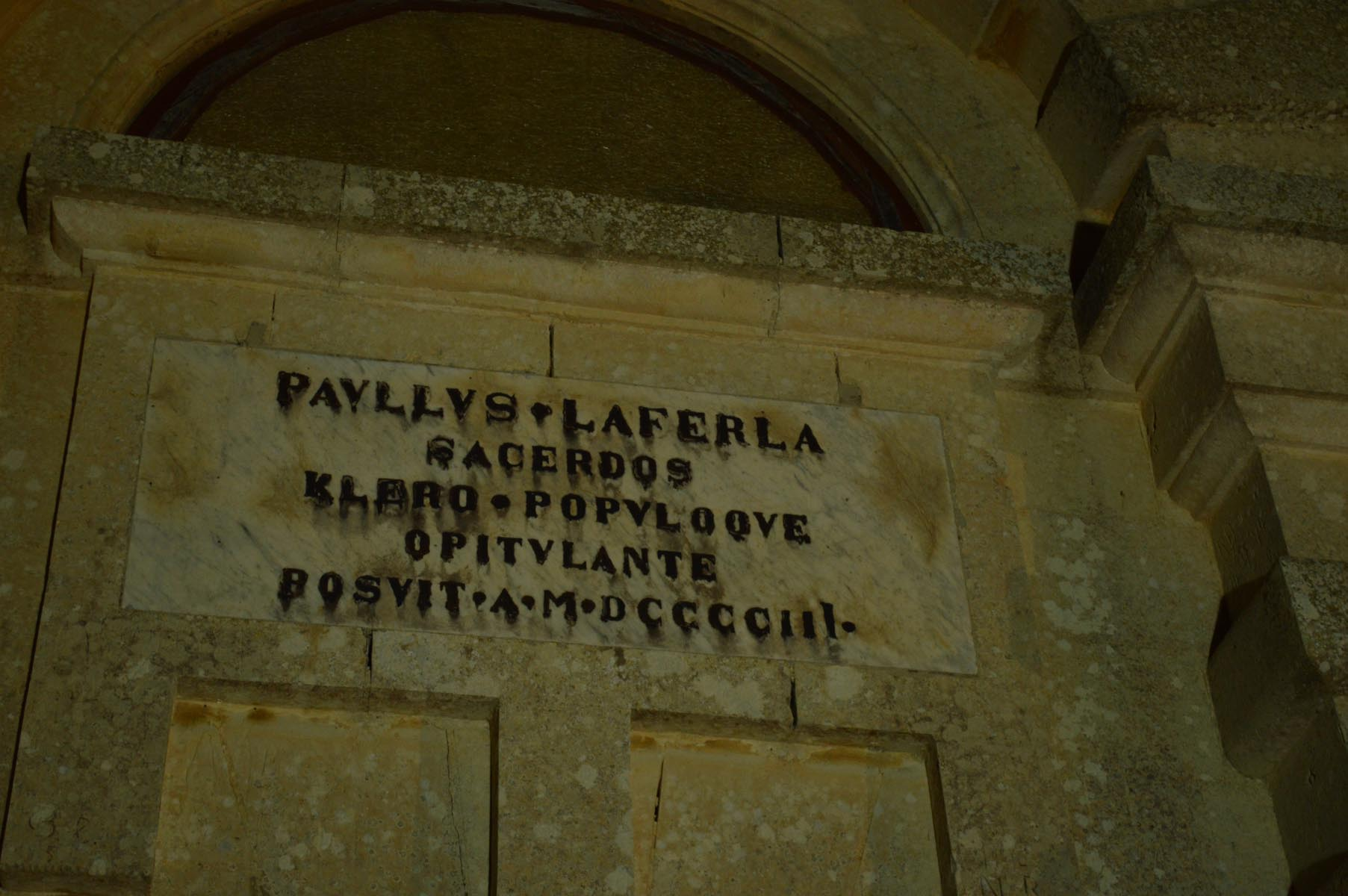
Inscription on the back side of the Laferla Cross shrine.

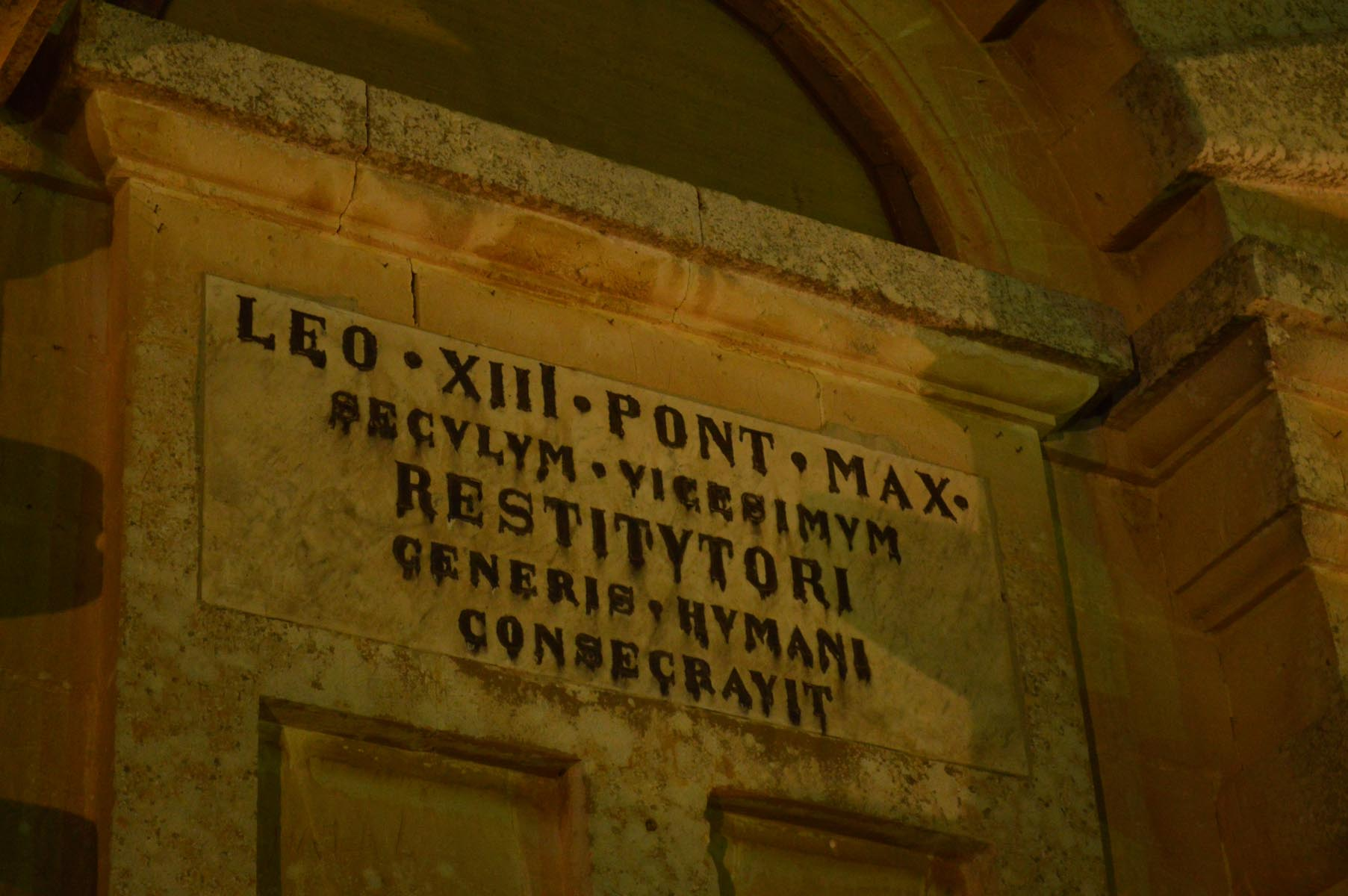
Inscription on the right side of the Laferla Cross shrine.

"JESV CHRISTO
RESTITVTORI
AN MDCCCCI"

"ORBIS CATHOLICVS
QVO TESTATIOR ESSET
EA CONSECRATIO
MONVMENTA
VLTRO CONSTITVIT"

"PAVLLVS LAFERLA
SACERDOS
KLERO POPVLOOVE
OPITVLANTE
POSVIT A MDCCCCIII"

"LEO XIII PONT MAX
SECVLVM VICESIMVM
RESTITVTORI
CENERIS HVMANI
CONSECRAVIT"

== Gallery ==
Pilgrimage to the Laferla Cross during the Holy Week
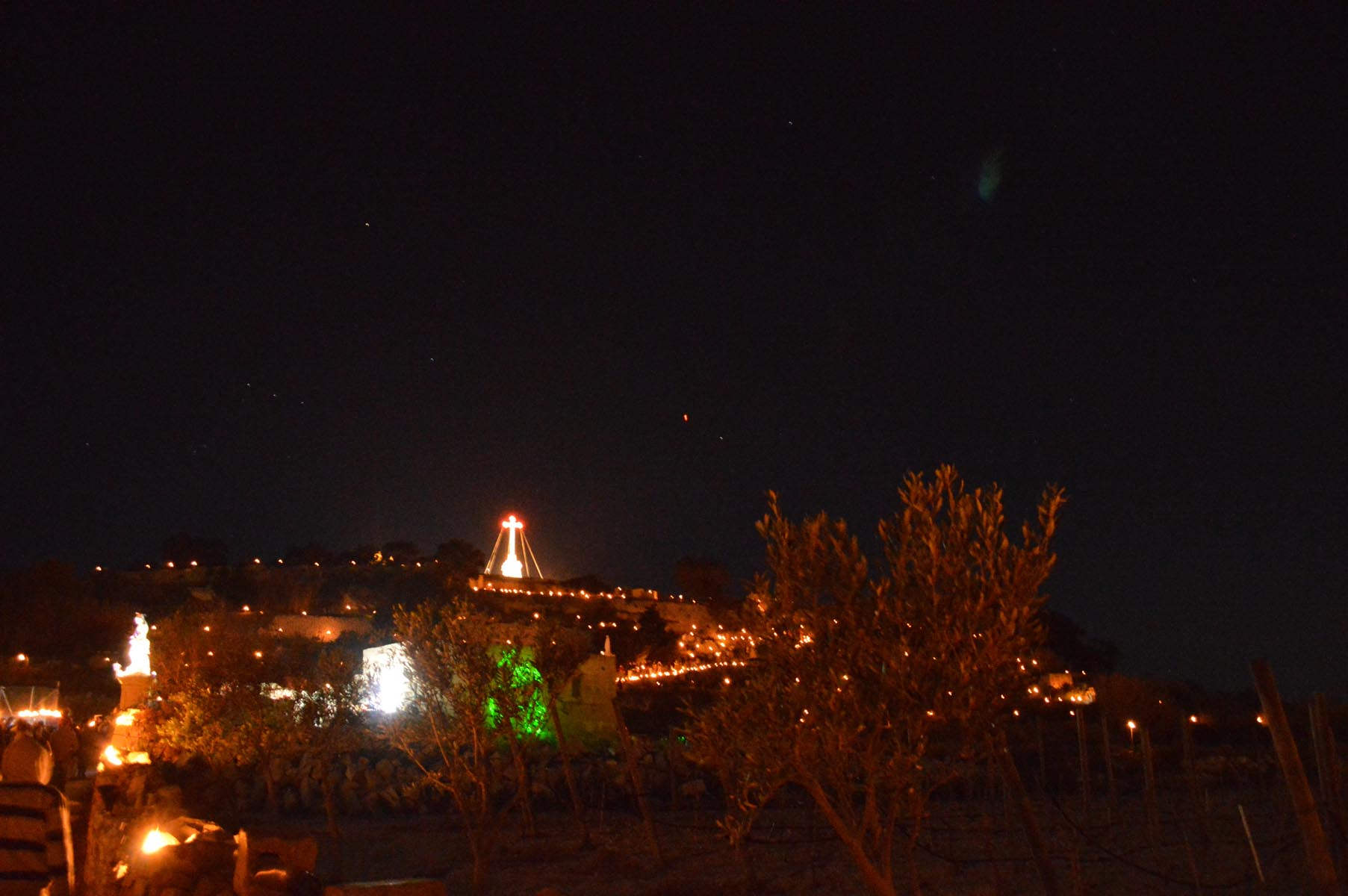
Hill leading to the Laferla Cross during the Holy Week.

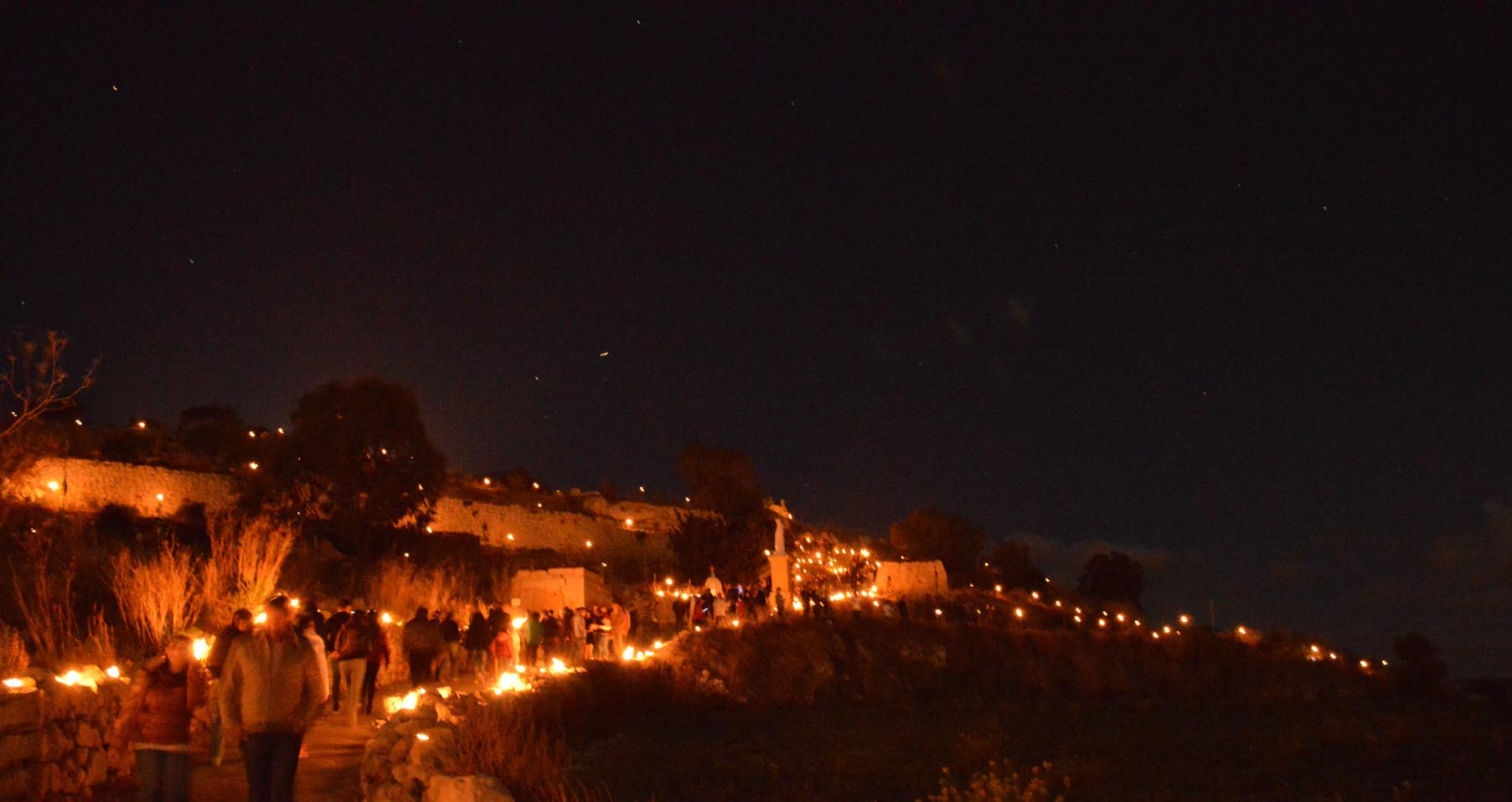
Hill leading to the Laferla Cross during the Holy Week.

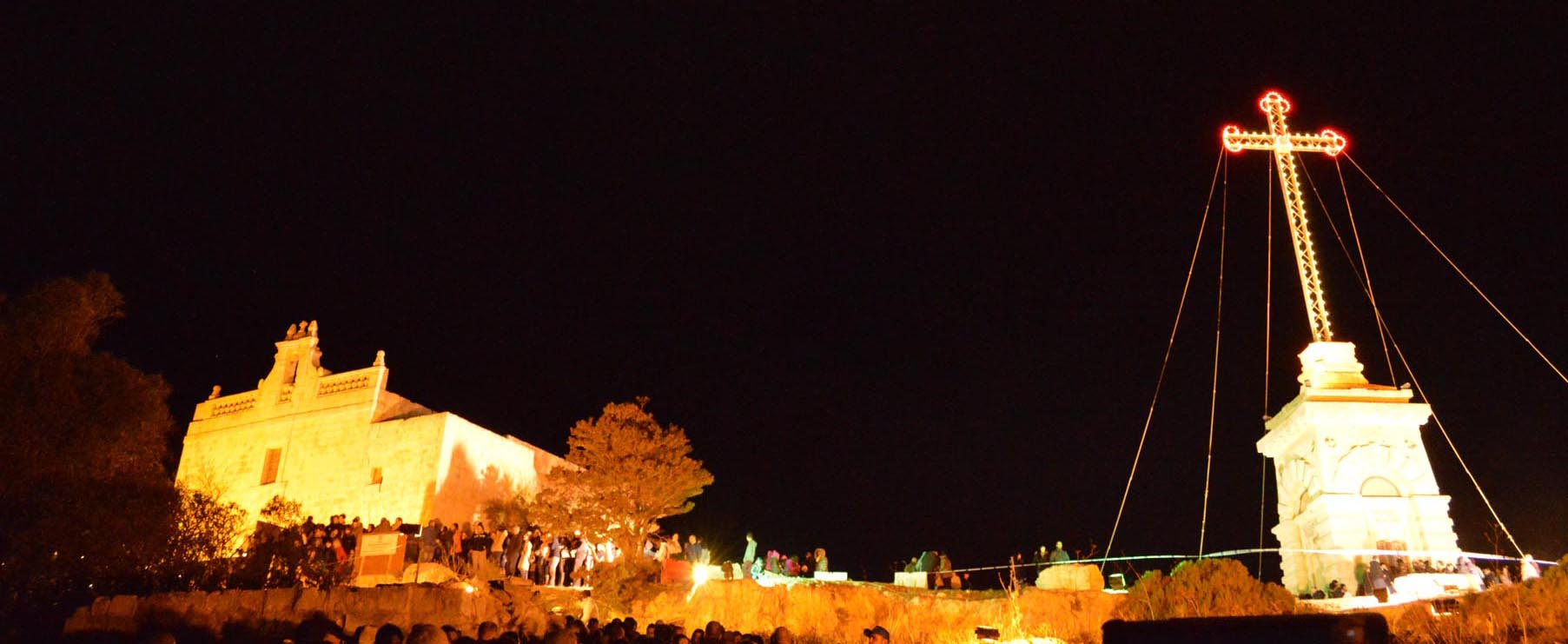
Laferla Cross and Chapel of the Annunciation.

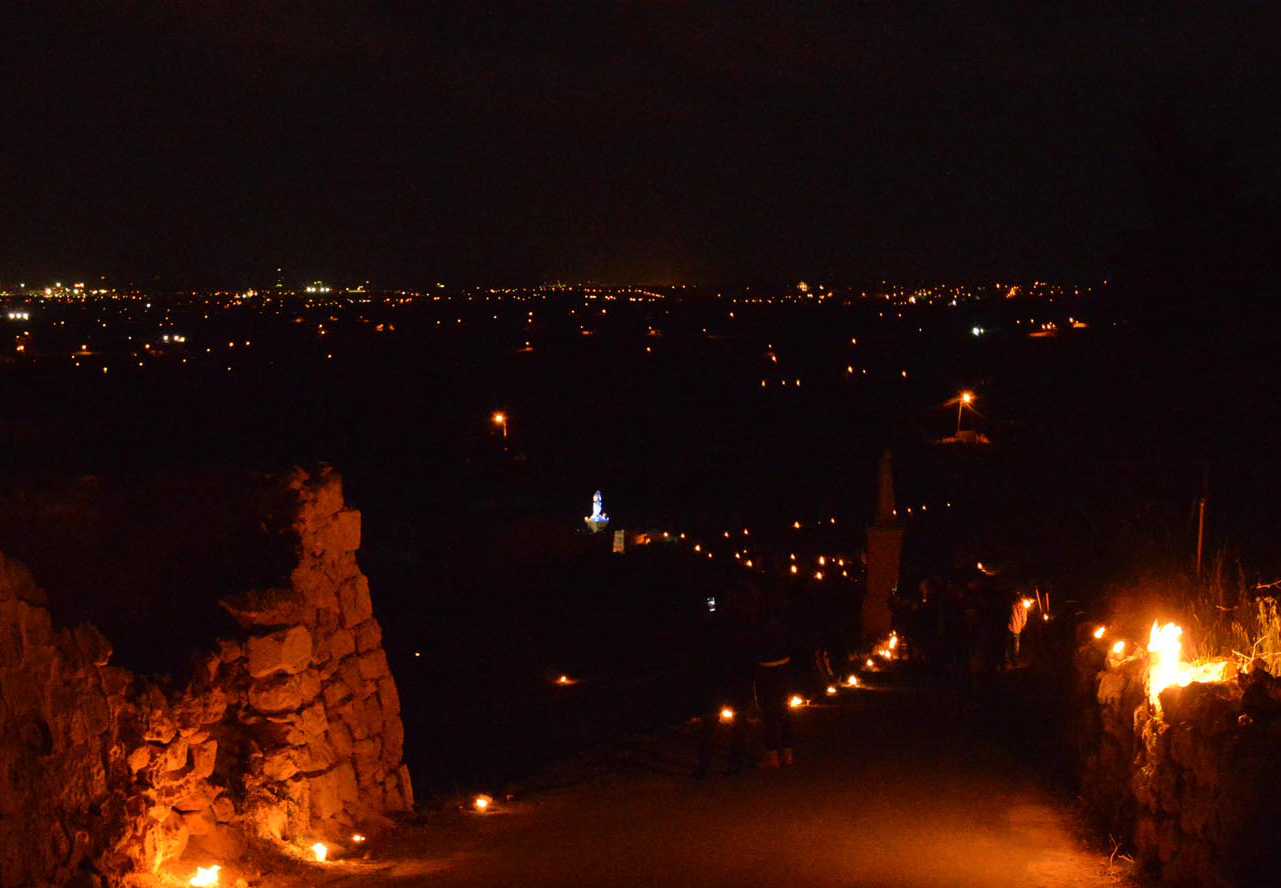
Hill leading to the Laferla Cross during the Holy Week.
Statues leading to the Laferla Cross
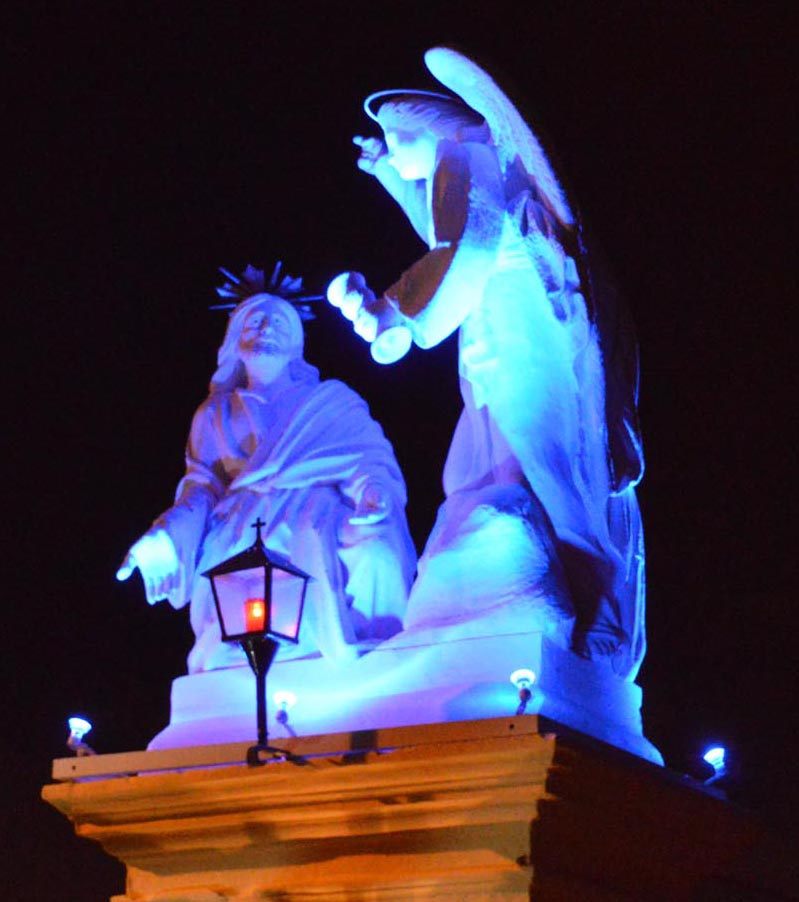
Effigy of Jesus Christ in the Gethsemane.

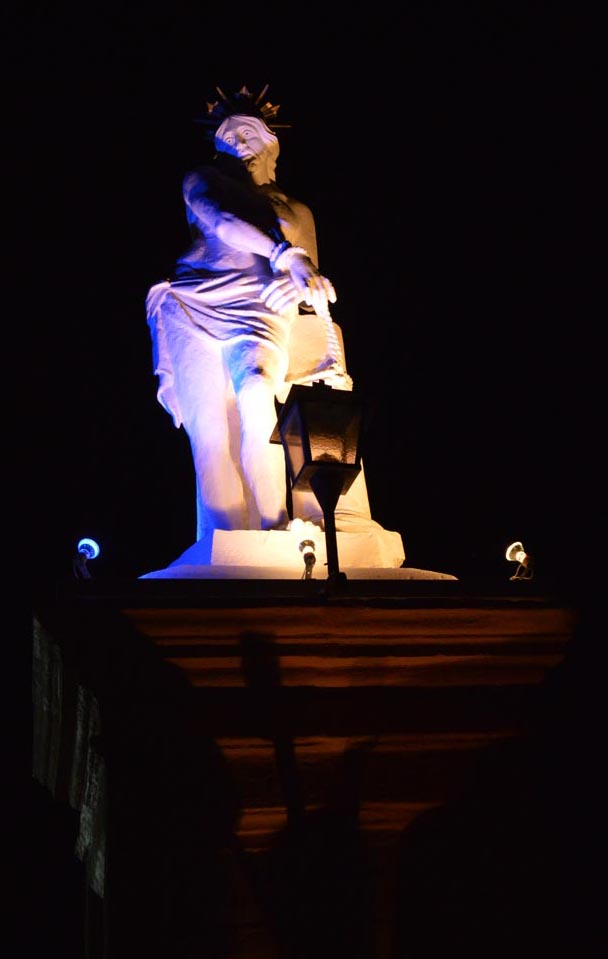
Effigy of the flagellation of Jesus Christ.

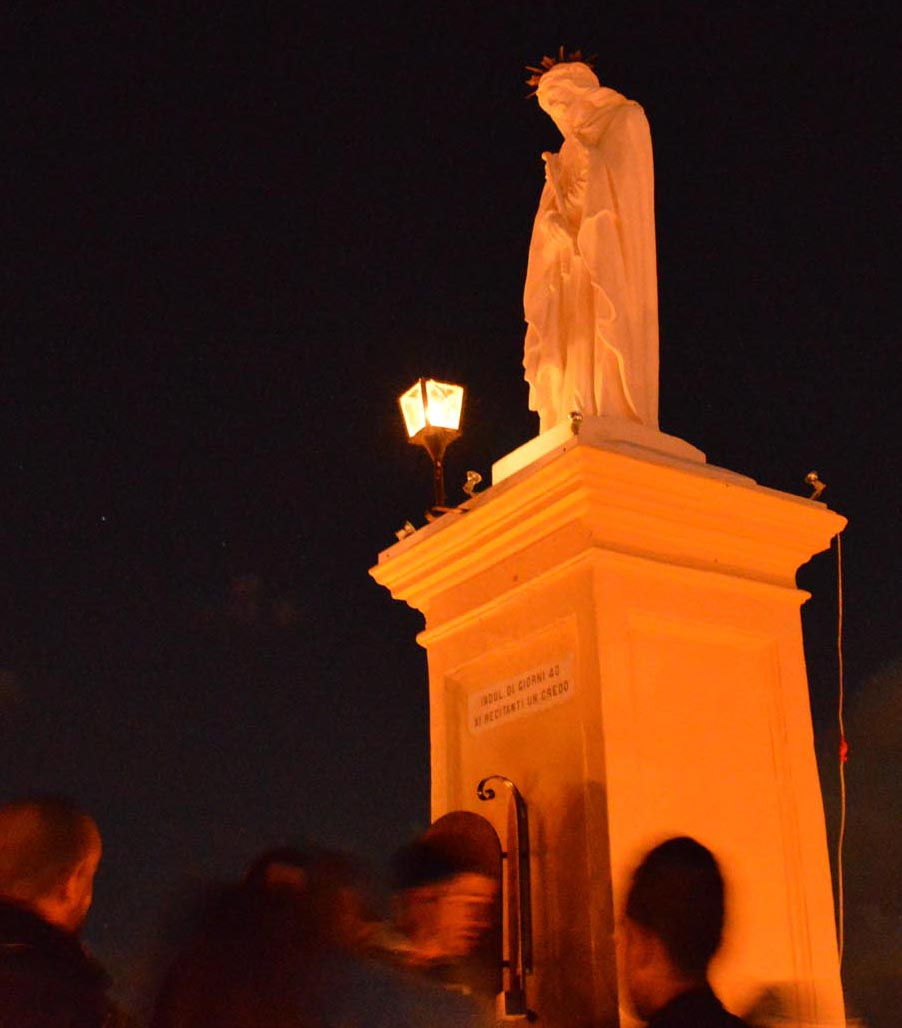
Effigy of Jesus Christ wearing the crown of thorns and purple robe.
Other elements of traditional interest
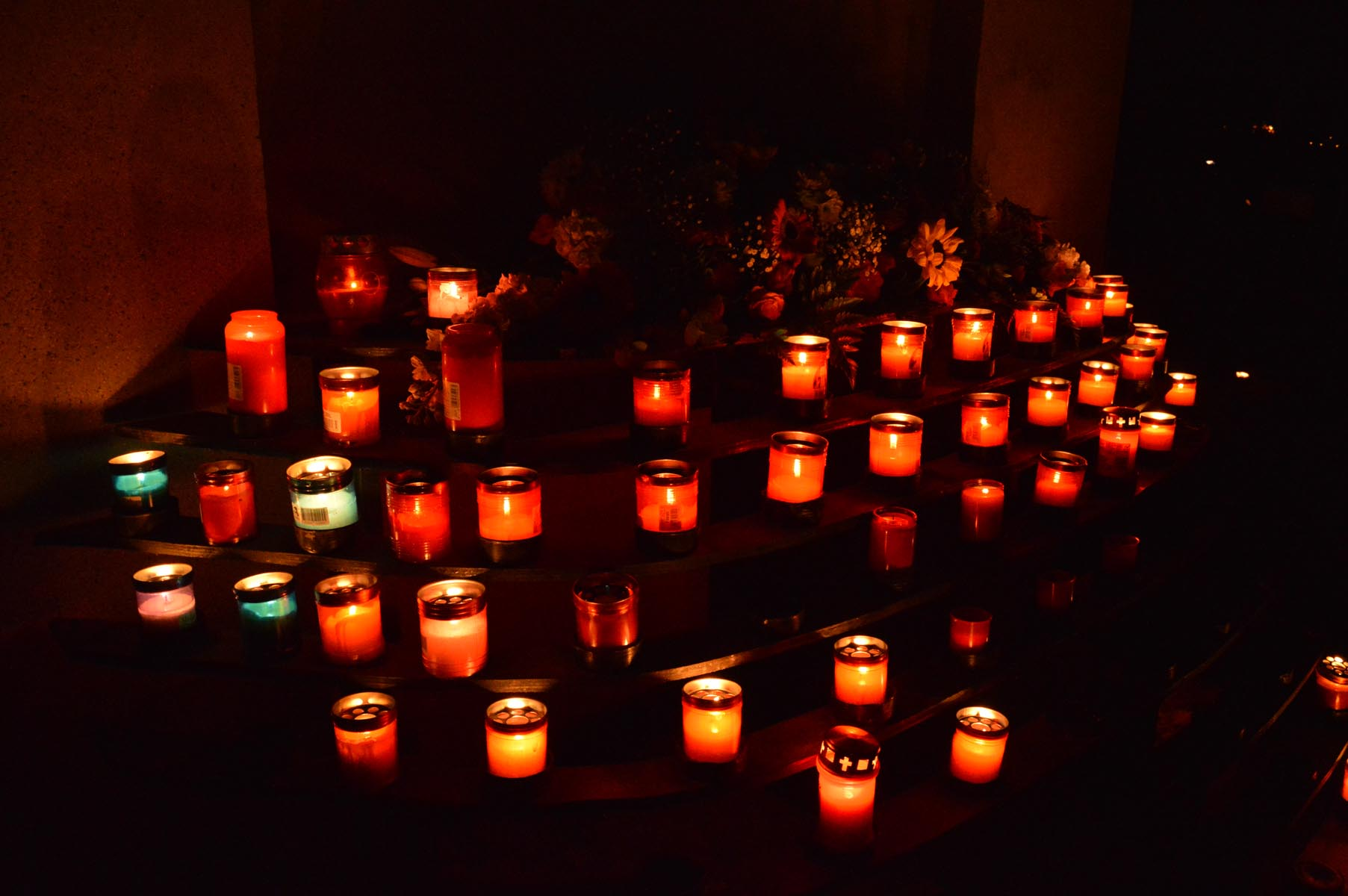
Candles offered in veneration to Jesus Christ during the Holy Week.

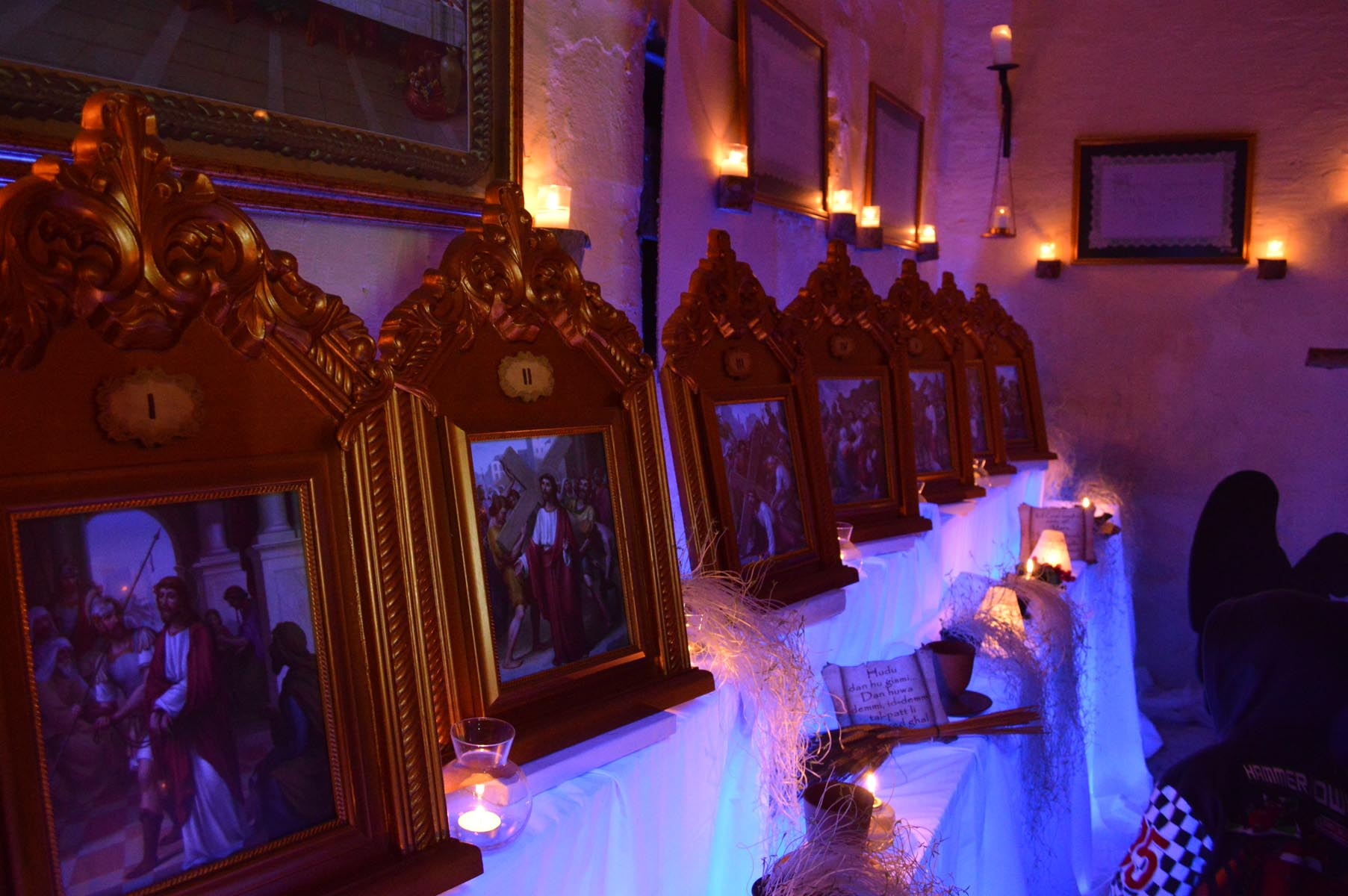
Exhibitions of paintings representing the passion of the Christ during the Holy Week at Siġġiewi, Malta.

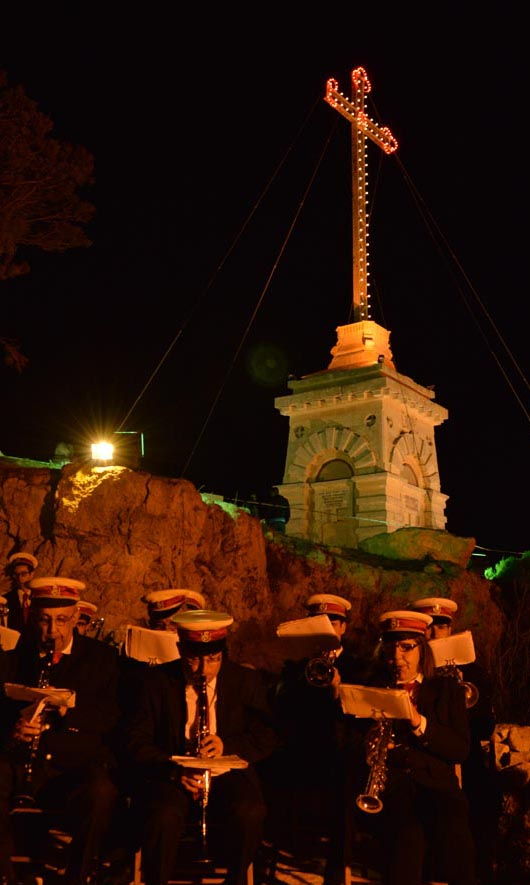
Band playing during the Holy Week.
