= Armoury (Siġġiewi) =

- L-Armerija
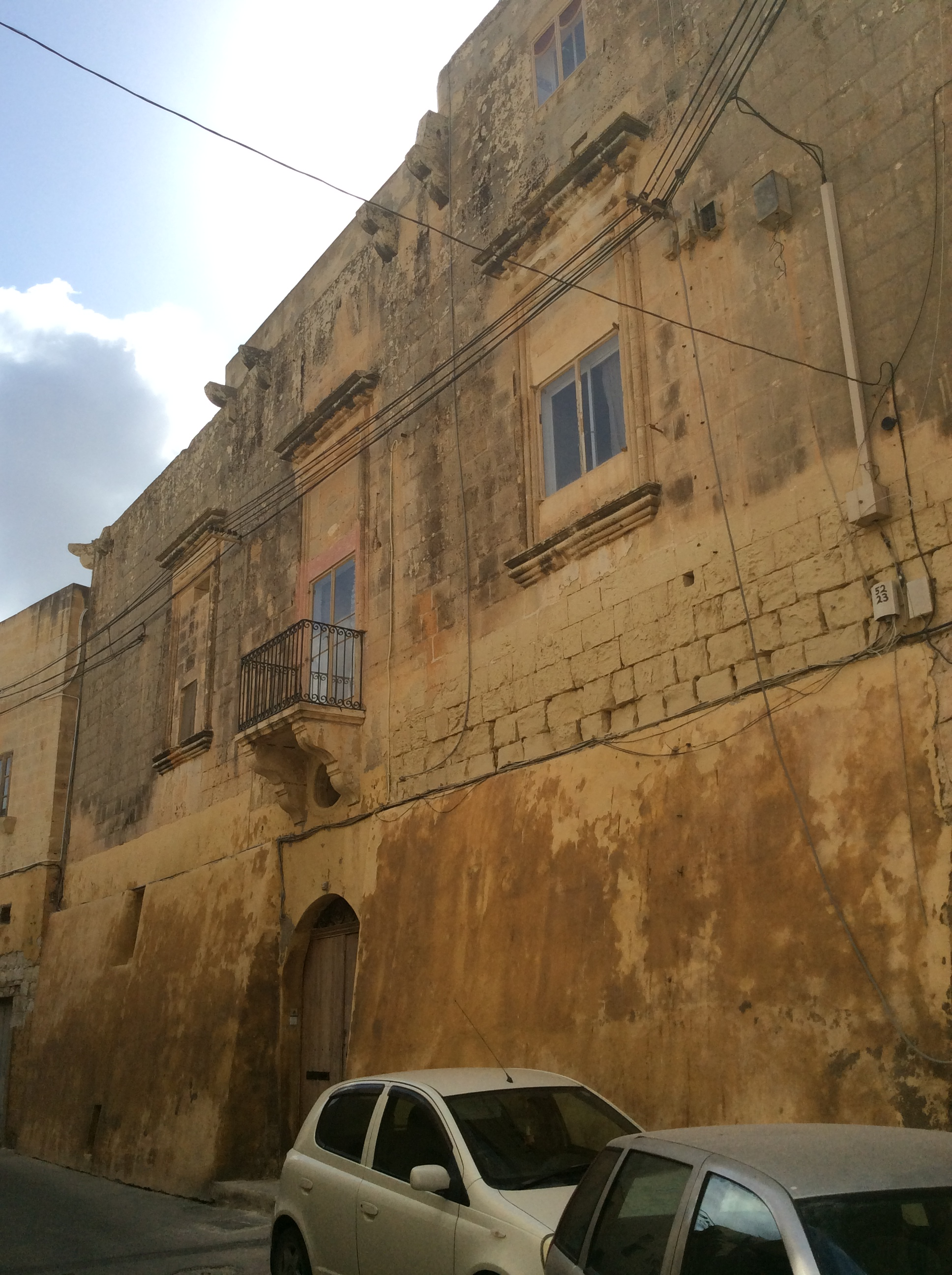
- View of the Armoury
- Interactive map of the Armoury area
- Alternative names: Old Fortified House

General information
- Status: Intact
- Type: Fortified house
- Location: Siġġiewi, Malta
- Coordinates: 35°51′20.2″N 14°26′27.8″E
- Owner: Private

Technical details
- Material: Limestone
- Floor count: 2

The Armoury (Maltese: L-Armerija), also known as the Old Fortified House (Maltese: Id-Dar il-Fortifikata l-Antika), is a historic building in Siġġiewi, Malta, which was originally used as the residence of captain of the village, and it also served as an arsenal where the weapons of the local militia were stored. The last Grand Master of Malta was hosted in the building by the captain during the feast of the village.

After the departure of the Order the building was adaptively reused according to the exigencies of the village or governor but lost its original purpose. It was used as a temporal school in the village, being among the first public education buildings, before being vacated. Located at 127 Triq il-Kbira (formerly Royal Street), it is a historic landmark, a Grade II scheduled building and a listed monument.

== History ==
The Armoury was purposely built as a defence post for the inhabitants of the village of Siggiewi. The building was used as a guardhouse and a residence for the captain or Lieutenant of the district. He was responsible for the people and was aided by the trained villagers. Their names were listed by the captain. The armoury was equipped with arms and other object for defence; these would be distributed by the captain and used by him and the chosen villagers when need comes. In general the use of arms took place when there were attacks on the village from the nearby Qormi and Zurrieq which are close to the sea.

Grand Master Ferdinand von Hompesch zu Bolheim was welcomed at the Armoury when he visited the village feast of Siġġiewi in 1797.

At one point, the building also served as a primary school.

== Architecture ==
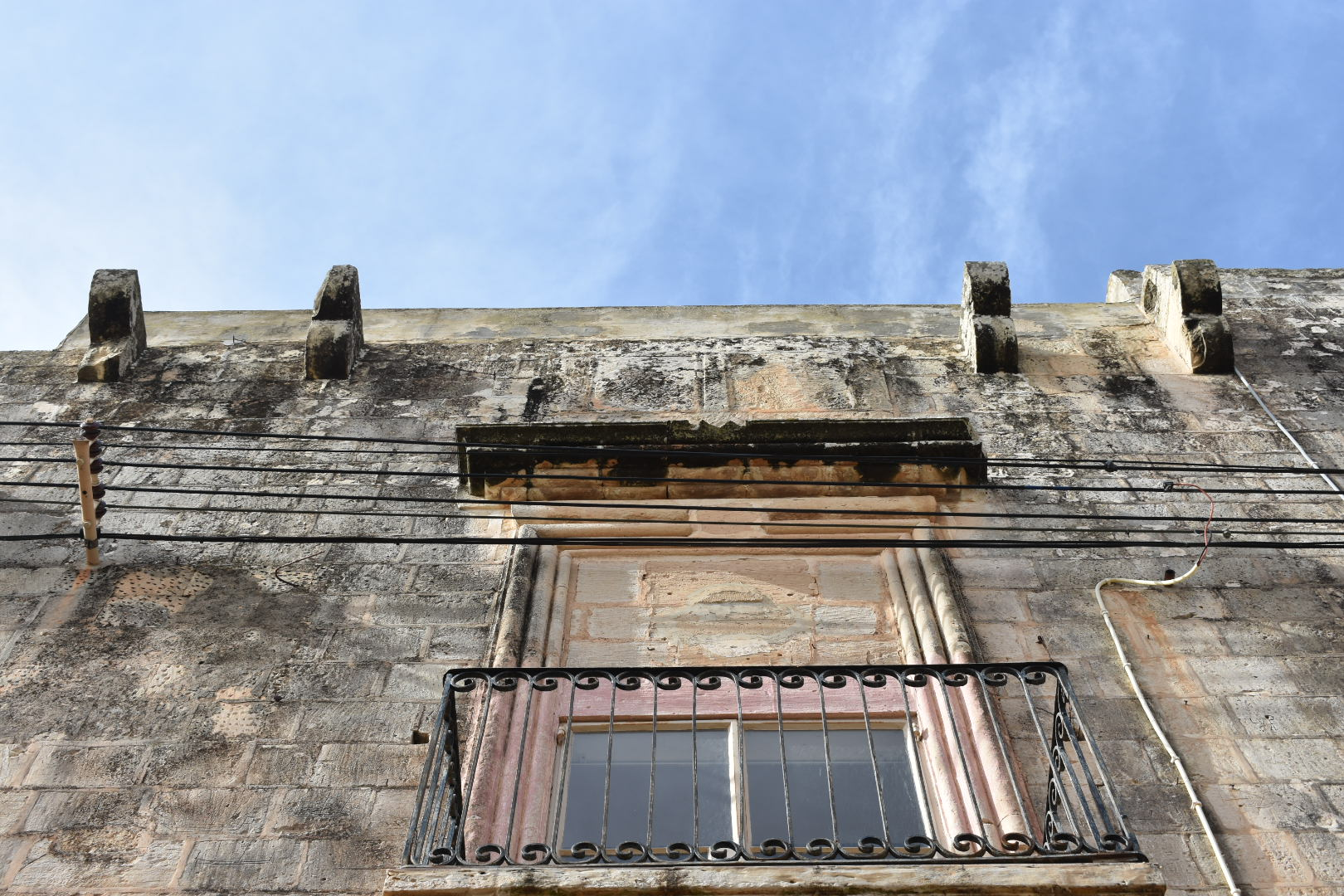
Remains of the machicolations

The Armoury is buttressed at ground floor and has another floor above. It has an arched entrance in the centre. An imposing open balcony is located above the doorway, and it is flanked by arrowslits on either side. The fortified building is complemented with three machicolations of which only the corbels and minor parts remain. The building is symmetric in design and feature traditional windows melitan moldings.

It is scheduled as a Grade II Scheduled property, and it is also listed on the National Inventory of the Cultural Property of the Maltese Islands.
