= Siġġiewi =

Siġġiewi Is-Siġġiewi Città Ferdinand, Siggieui
- City and Local council
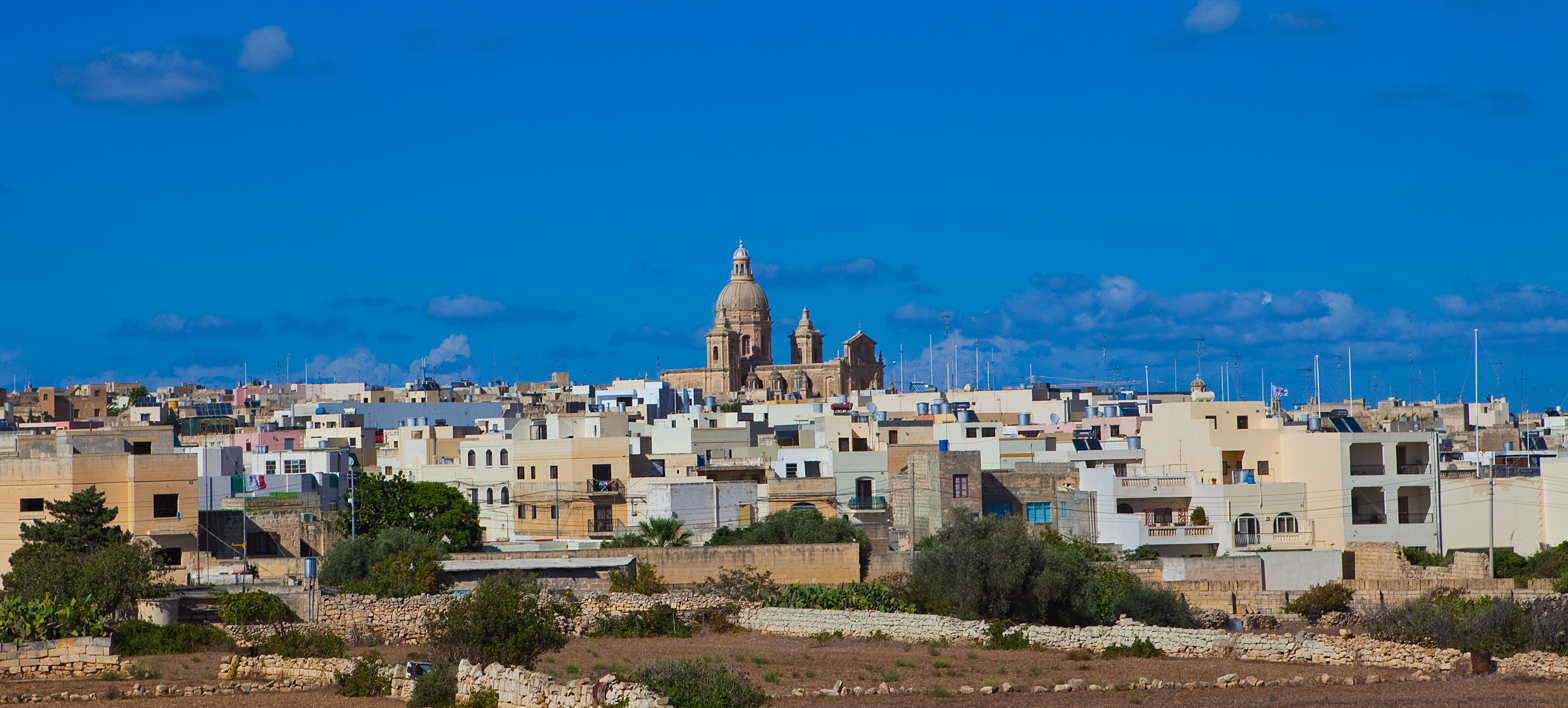
- Skyline of Siġġiewi

- Flag Coat of arms
- Motto: Labore et Virtute (Work and Virtue)
- Coordinates: 35°51′15″N 14°26′18″E
- Country: Malta
- Region: Western Region
- District: Western District
- Borders: Dingli, Luqa, Mqabba, Qormi, Qrendi, Rabat, Żebbuġ

Government
  - Mayor: Ryan Cachia (PN)
  - Deputy Mayor: Stephanie Vassallo PN

Area
  - Total: 19.9 km^{2} (7.7 sq mi)

Population (2024)
  - Total: 9,697
  - Density: 487/km^{2} (1,260/sq mi)
- Demonym(s): Siġġiewi (masculine), Siġġiwija (feminine), Siġġiwin (people)
- Time zone: UTC+1 (CET)
  - Summer (DST): UTC+2 (CEST)
- Postal code: SGW
- Dialing code: 356
- ISO 3166 code: MT-55
- Patron saint: St. Nicholas
- Day of festa: Last Sunday of June
- Website: siggiewi.gov.mt

Siġġiewi (Maltese: Is-Siġġiewi [ɪsːɪˈd͡ʒːɪːwɪ]), also called by its title Città Ferdinand, is a city and a local council in the Western Region of Malta.The island of Filfla is part of the village. It is the third largest council in Malta by surface area, after Rabat and Mellieħa. Siġġiewi is situated on a plateau approximately 5 kilometers (3 miles) away from Mdina (the ancient capital city of Malta) and 10 kilometres (6 miles) away from Valletta, the contemporary capital.

The population of Siġġiewi was 9,697 in July 2024. This included 4,895 males and 4,802 females; 8,947 Maltese nationals and 750 foreign nationals.

== History ==
In its demographic and topographical formation, Siġġiewi followed a pattern common to other villages in Malta: absorbing nearby hamlets. Before the arrival of the Order of St John in 1530, there were multiple thriving hamlets in the area. Over time, Ħal Xluq, Ħal Kbir, Ħal Niklusi, and Ħal Qdieri were absorbed in Siġġiewi with only their chapels remaining.

The origins of the name Siġġiewi are unknown. A possible source is the Arabic word سَجَا (sajā) meaning 'to be quiet or calm', hence 'Siġġiewi' would mean a quiet place. Another origin may be a corruption of an old surname, such as Sageyo. The areas around Siġġiewi were occupied by the first farmers during the Neolithic period. The Neolithic sites of Hagar Qim and Mnajdra (3600-2500 BC) are within 3 kilometers of the village. Siġġiewi is also located near the Bronze Age settlement of Wardija ta’ San Gorg, near at the southern tail end of Dingli Cliffs, and the Bronze Age cart ruts at ix-Xaghra ta’ Ghar il-Kbir (1500-750/800 BC).

An early Phoenician tomb was located in the area, and small Phoenician/Punic cemeteries are present on the hilltop of tal-Gholja and at ix-Xaghra ta’ Ghar il-kbir. Roman pottery scatters have been encountered in numerous locations near the village, evidencing that the environs of Siġġiewi were occupied during the Roman occupation of Malta and Gozo.

A series of early Christian catacombs are located close to the Maghlaq valley. One of these, published in several sources, has been intentionally buried under a field.

Siġġiewi's patron saint is Saint Nicholas. Survival of the saint's veneration may suggest that following the end of the catacomb era, some of Malta's villages may have retained their old traditions. Hundreds of place names are known from various fields and locations around Siġġiewi. These names are Semitic but are of an unknown age, having been recorded in notarial deeds only in the Late Middle Ages. Some of these places developed into hamlets, and others may have supported small communities that were never recorded, but these hamlets would ultimately dwindle in importance in their coming years. The depopulation of the Maltese rural areas during the Great Siege of 1565 hastened the end of small hamlets around Malta and Gozo. The arrival of the Order of St John in Malta in 1530 ushered in new economic dynamics that made new urban areas, especially the city of Valletta, more attractive than isolated villages.

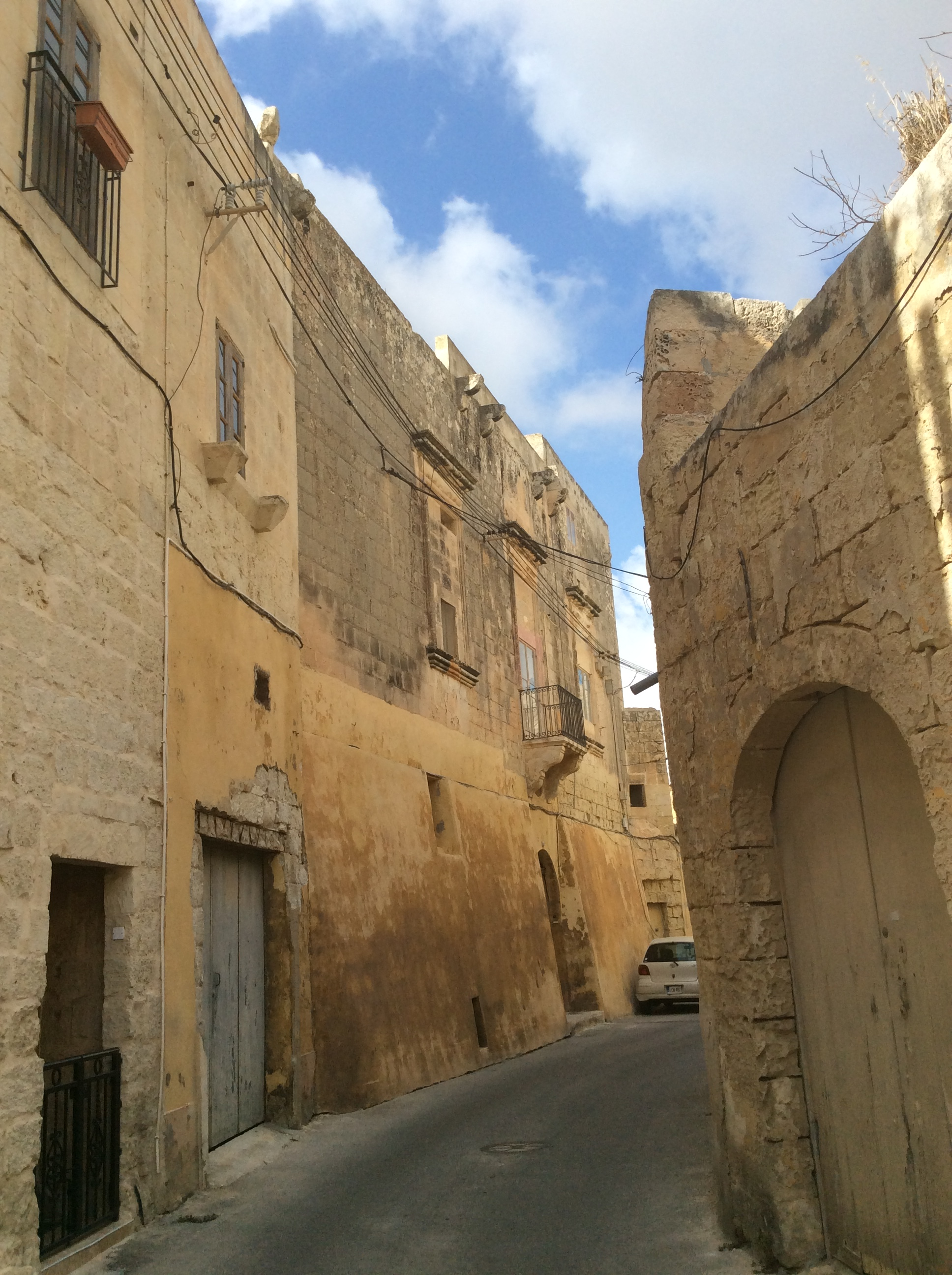
The Armoury

Several buildings in Siġġiewi date back to knight Hospitaller rule, including the Armoury. Siġġiewi's growth likely came at the expense of neighboring hamlets. Market agglomeration around Siġġiewi, a promontory that stands between two important valleys and is therefore defensible, also encouraged geo-demographic changes.

On 30 December 1797, after a formal request by Don Salvatore Curso, on behalf of his parishioners, Grand Master Ferdinand von Hompesch instituted the village as a city, naming it after himself as "Città Ferdinand".

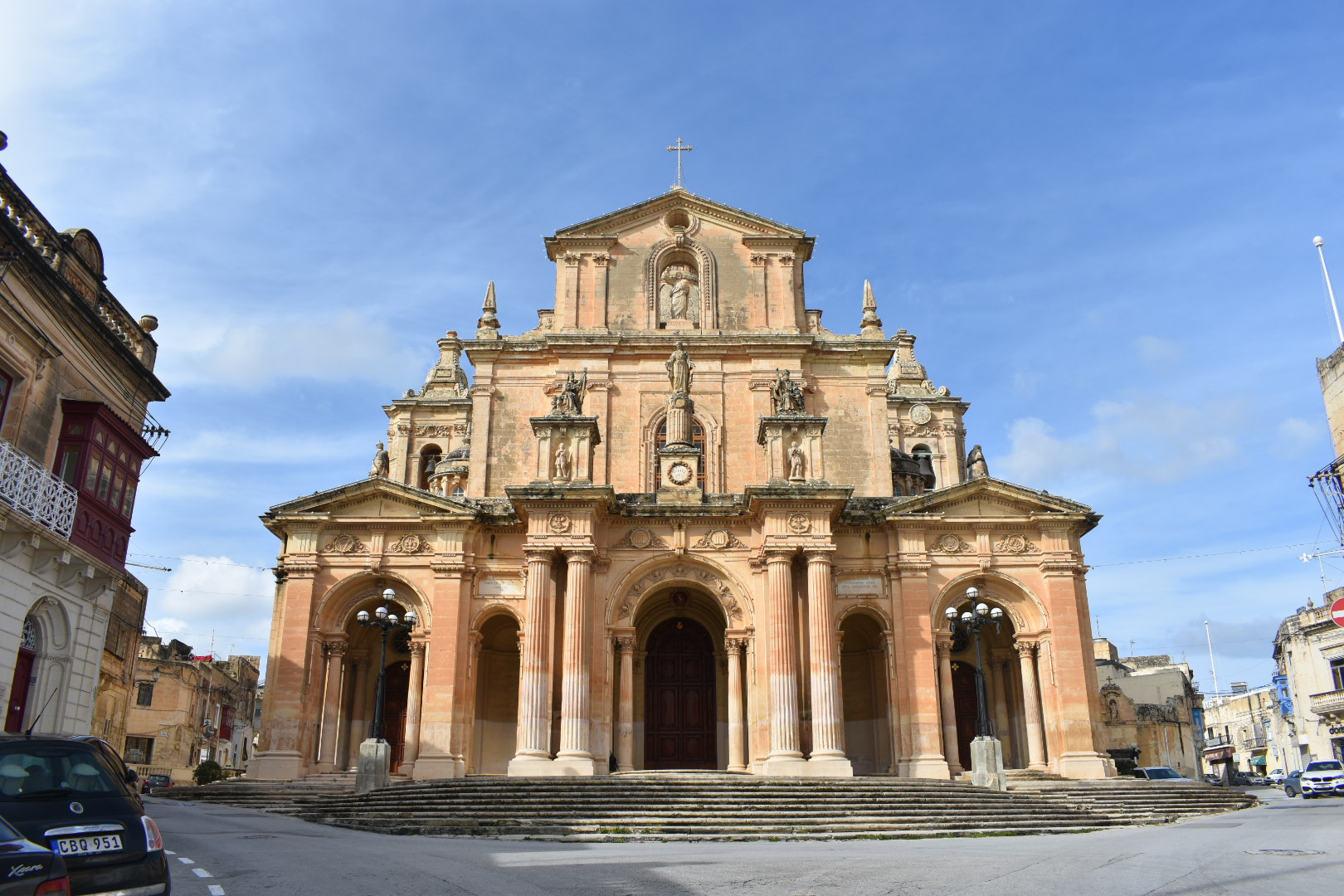
Parish Church of St Nicholas of Bari

The ruins of the former parish church, dedicated to St Nicholas of Bari are still visible today, after great restoration works. The baroque parish churchdedicated to the saint was erected by the villagers who raised the necessary funds between the years 1676 to 1693. It was designed by the Maltese architect Lorenzo Gafà but underwent several alterations throughout the years, such as the portico and naves that were added by Professor Nicola Żammit in the latter half of the 19th century.

The titular painting in the church is 'Il calabrese' by Mattia Preti, who was also responsible for the painting on the vault of St John's Co-Cathedral in Valletta. The wooden statue which is carried in procession on the city feast day (the last Sunday of June) was sculptured by Pietro Felici in 1736.

In 1732, Pietro Felici created the stone statue which still stands in the center of the square. On its pedestal, there is a Latin prayer which implores the saint to bless the fields which the faithful laboriously till.

== Tourism ==
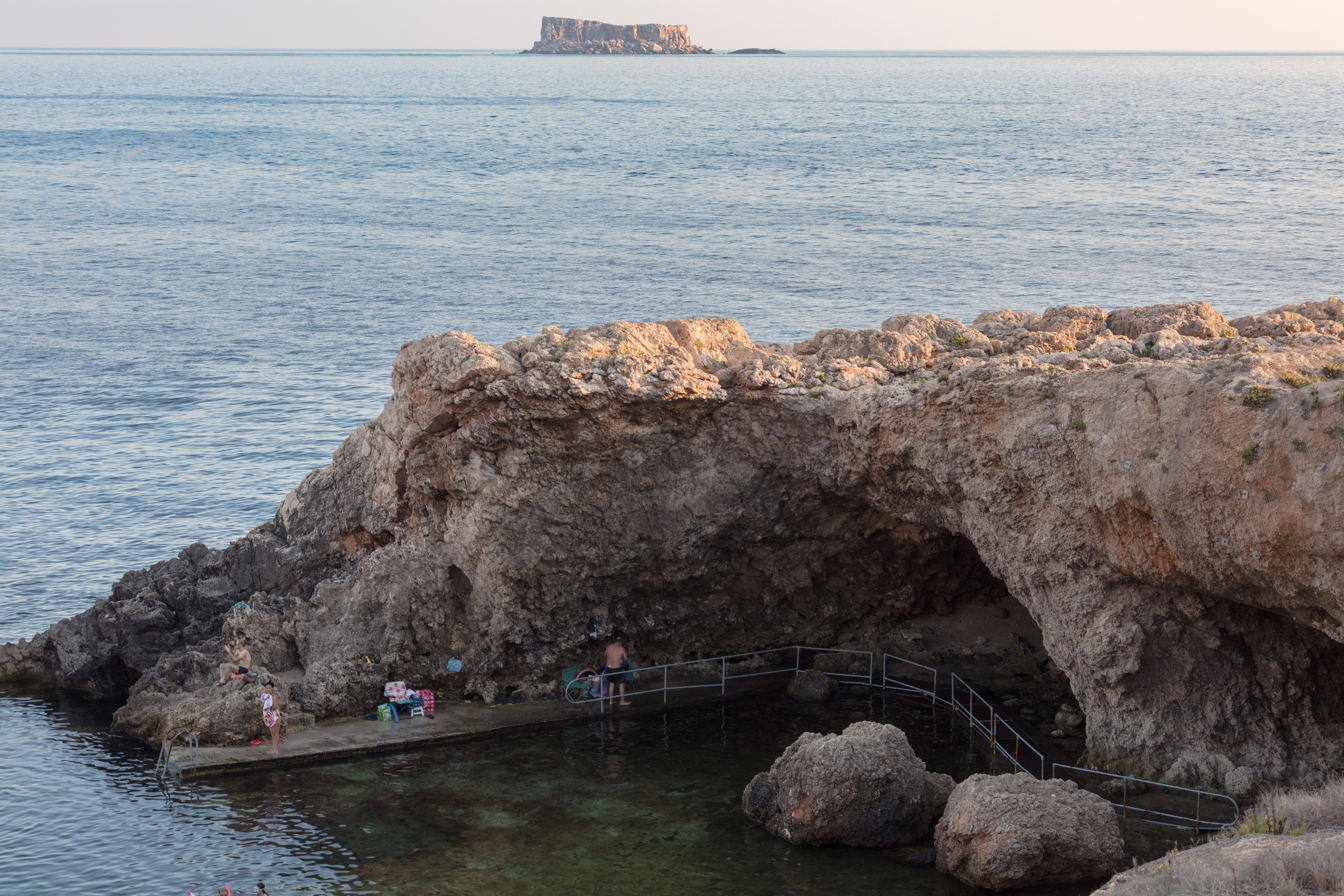
Ghar Lapsi, a popular place for swimming.

Located in Siġġiewi is the Girgenti Palace, built in 1625 as the summer residence of inquisitor Onorato Visconti. It was renovated by inquisitor Angelo Dorini in 1763. Today, it is the Maltese Prime Minister's official residence. The palace of Grand Master Verdalle, known as Verdala Palace, now serves as the Maltese President's summer residence. Adjoining this palace is the Buskett Gardens, a small semi-wild woodland previously used as hunting grounds.

Within the local council of Siġġiewi lie Għar Lapsi, Fawwara, Girgenti, Ta' Kandja, and the Hill of Laferla Cross. From there the islet of Filfla can be seen on the horizon. The village stands on a flat plateau flanked by two relatively deep valleys (Wied il-Hesri and Wied Xkora).

There are several niches in the old part of the city, some of which date back to the middle of the 17th century and are a sign of devotion as well as architectural decoration. Several small chapels are found within the boundaries of Siġġiewi, including that dedicated to Our Lady of Providence, a notable example of Maltese Baroque architecture in the city.

Siġġiewi celebrates a local Feast in the last week of June in honor of Saint Nicholas, with band marches around the streets, aerial fireworks, Catherine wheels, street decorations, and celebrations in the main church. The Limestone Heritage Park & Gardens is an attraction situated in a renovated quarry. Maltese summer folklore evening also takes place between May and October. Malta Falconry Centre lies just outside the city.

Until several decades ago, almost all of the population was employed in the fields which surround the city. In 1993, the city adopted the motto "Labore et Virtute" ("Work and Virtue").

== Patron saint ==
Every village in Malta celebrates the local church's patron saint with a major festa lasting a week. When the main Saint Nicholas festa in Siġġiewi is held on the last Sunday in June, the Church of Saint Nicholas is decorated and lit. The whole village is festooned with garlands, banners, and flags. Festival week is also a time for visiting and hospitality, as people all over from Malta come to enjoy the celebration.

Throughout the week, brass bands, such as the St. Nicholas Band Club and Siġġiewi Festival Brass Band and Social Club, march and play in competitions.

During the festival, food stalls sell ice cream, hot dogs, burgers, kebabs, chips, and more. Special sweets include mqaret, pastry stuffed with dates, and white nougat with almonds or peanuts.

The week features many processions and religious services. The liturgical music inside the Siġġiewi Parish church starts with the triduum which is followed by a Solemn Benediction of the Blessed Sacrament, Solemn Te Deum, Vespers, and Solemn mass on the day of the feast. Siġġiewi is synonymous with music by the famed Paolo Nani.

On the evening before the Sunday feast day, a major procession with brass bands goes through the village. On Sunday, the large St. Nicholas statue is carried by a procession through the village. This procession includes music, incense burning, confetti thrown by bystanders, and palm branches and flowers. On returning to the church, the statue is customarily welcomed with clapping, crying, and singing. Inside the church, the adoration of the Blessed Sacrament follows.

During the festival, each town strives to have the most extravagant fireworks and the most accomplished musicians. These rivalries have historical origins—when the churches were built, parishioners gave generously to build the most elaborate churches they could afford.

Though the main festa, like many traditional festivals in Malta, is in June, the Liturgical Feast of Saint Nicholas takes place on 6 December. The 6 December feast has become synonymous with a children's procession from the local Primary School to the Parish Church accompanied by the two local band clubs. In the evening a solemn mass is celebrated which is followed by fireworks and a musical concert by the Saint Nicholas Band Club. The 'Grupp tal-Armar 6 ta' Dicembru' which is responsible for the splendor and decorations worthy of a great feast decorates the main square with six artistic banners.

== Culture and sport ==
Siġġiewi is the location of two band clubs, the Banda San Nikola A.D.1883 and the Siġġiewi Festival Brass Band, founded in 1986. The Siġġiewi Festival Brass Band was the first band established in Malta which plays only instruments made of brass. It is also the home of Siġġiewi Rowing Club, Siġġiewi Scout group, Siġġiewi Football Club, and Siġġiewi Basketball Club. The St Nicholas Fireworks Factory is based in the town. Siġġiewi is also home to the ta' Kandja shooting range which hosted the ISSF Shotgun World Cup in June 2018.

== Areas in Siġġiewi ==
- Buskett
- Bur ix-Xewk
- Fawwara
- Girgenti
- Għajn il-Kbira
- Għar il-Kbir
- Għar Lapsi
- Għar Mundu
- Ħal-Farruġ
- Ħesri
- Laferla Cross (Salib tal-Għolja)
- Qajjied
- Rdum Dikkiena
- Ta' Brija
- Ta' Nghajsa
- Ta' Dun Konz
- Ta' Fonzu
- Ta' Fuq il-Blat
- Ta' Kandja
- Ta' Kirċippu
- Ta' Raba'
- Ta' Żagi
- Ta' Zuta
- Tal-Għaqba
- Tal-Imwiegel
- Tal-Għolja
- Tal-Providenza
- Vina l-Kbira
- Wied il-Girgenti
- Wied il-Ħesri
- Wied il-Luq
- Wied San Anton
- Wied Xkora

== Literature ==
- Carmel Vella, Siġġiewi (Città Ferdinand)- A Profile of History, Social Life and Traditions.
- Pawlu Aquilina, Hawn Twieldet u tibqa' thabbat Qalbi. (My heart was born here and will beat here forever). Memoirs/social history of the last 70 years.
