= Roads in Malta =

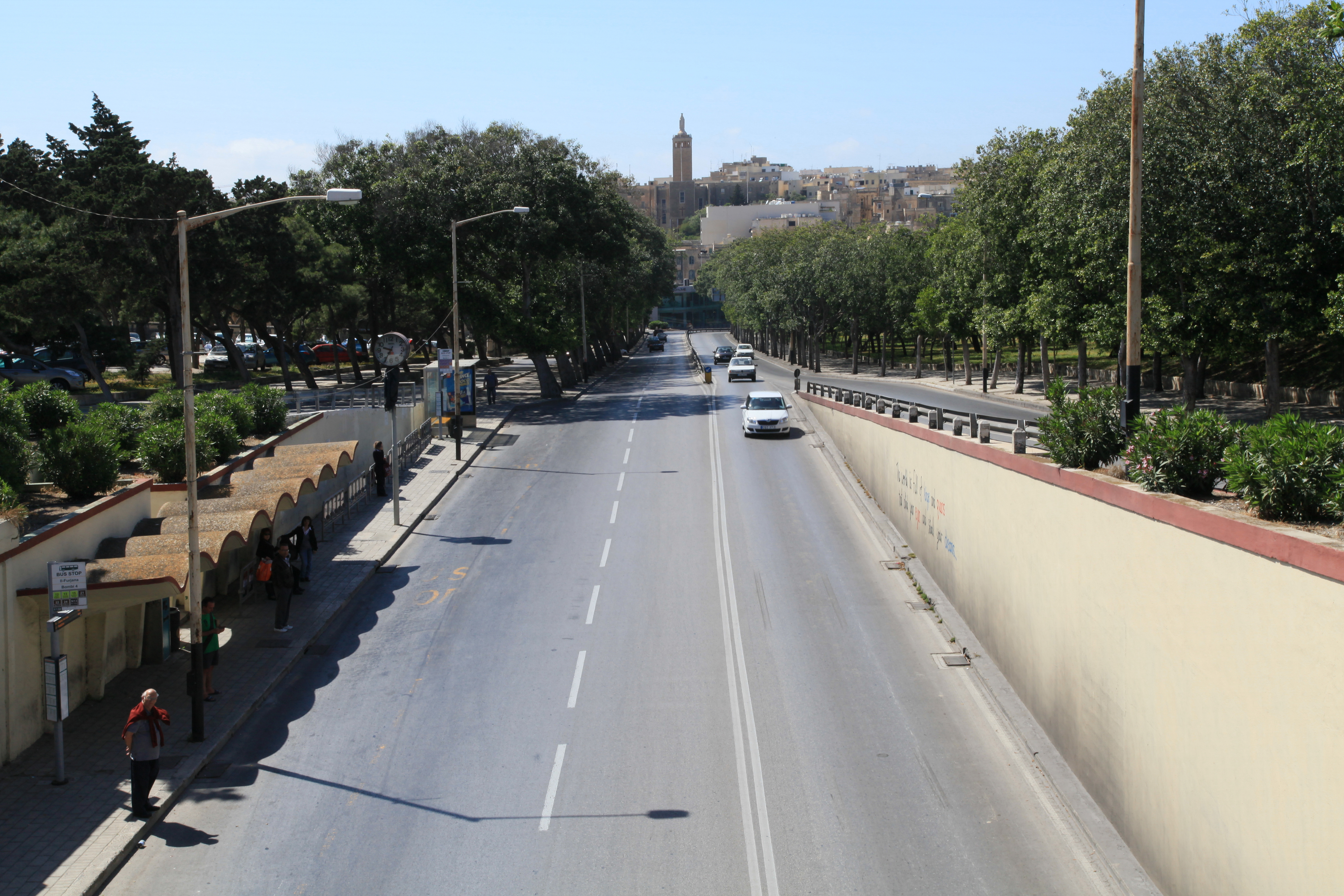
Triq l-Indipendenza

In Malta, most of the main roads are in the outskirts of the localities to connect one urban area with another urban area. The most important roads are those that connect the south of the island with the northern part, like Tal-Barrani Road, Aldo Moro Street in Marsa (the widest road in Malta) and Birkirkara Bypass (the busiest road in Malta).

Traffic in Malta drives on the left. Car ownership in Malta is excessively high, given the islands' small size. In 1990, there were 182,254 registered cars, giving an automobile density of 582 per km^{2}. In 2009, the country had the fifth-highest number of vehicles per capita in the world, with 607 motor vehicles per 1,000 people. At the end of March 2022, the number of licensed motor vehicles reached 414,669.

Malta has 3,096 kilometres of road, 2,704 km (87.3%) of which are paved and 392 km are unpaved as of 2008. The official road user guide for Malta is The Highway Code.

== Route Network in Malta ==
=== Route 1 ===
From Ċirkewwa (Il-Mellieħa) to Birżebbuġa:

- Ċirkewwa – Gozo Ferry Terminal
- Triq il-Marfa (Marfa Road) – passes from Marfa, Wied Musa Bay, Red Tower area to Għadira Beach (Mellieħa Bay)
- Dawret il-Mellieħa (Mellieħa Bypass) – leading from Għadira Beach (Mellieħa Bay), Popeye Village (Anchor Bay), San Niklaw to Ta' Pennellu in Il-Mellieħa
- Triq Louis Wettinger – leading from Ta' Pennellu (Il-Mellieħa) to Selmun Palace area
- It-Telgħa ta' Selmun (Selmun Hill) – leading from Il-Mellieħa to Mistra Battery area
- Triq il-Mistra (Mistra Road) – leading from Mistra Battery area to Daħlet il-Fekruna Bay, Xemxija (San Pawl il-Baħar)
- Telgħet ix-Xemxija (Xemxija Hill) – the main road of Xemxija (San Pawl il-Baħar (from Daħlet il-Fekruna Bay to Pwales)
- Xatt il-Pwales (Pwales Beach) – near Simar, Xemxija
- part of Triq Għajn Tuffieħa (Golden Bay Road) – leading from Xemxija to Għajn Tuffieħa (near The Olympic Garden)
- Dawret San Pawl (St. Paul's Bay Bypass) – leading from Xemxija and Tal-Fjuri area to Tal-Erba' Mwieżeb area in Buġibba (San Pawl il-Baħar)
- Kennedy Drive – leading from Tal-Erba' Mwieżeb area in Buġibba to Kennedy Groce and Salina Bay, In-Naxxar
- Triq is-Salini (Salina Road) – leading from Salina Bay to Għallis, Magħtab, Qalet Marku Bay and Baħar iċ-Ċagħaq
- Tul il-Kosta (Coast Road) – leading from Baħar iċ-Ċagħaq and San Ġwann Evanġelista area to Is-Swieqi, Madliena and St Patrick's in Pembroke, Malta
- Triq Sant' Andrija (St. Andrews' Road) – leading from Is-Swieqi, High Ridge, Madliena and Pembroke, Malta to Paceville and San Ġiljan
- Triq Mikiel Anton Vassalli (Regional Road) – leading from Paceville and San Ġiljan to San Ġwann, Tas-Sliema, Il-Gżira and University of Malta (L-Imsida)
- Triq Reġjonali (Regional Road) – leading from L-Imsida and University of Malta (Tal-Qroqq) to Santa Venera and Ħal Qormi
- Dawret il-Marsa u l-Ħamrun (Marsa-Ħamrun Bypass) – leading from Santa Venera to Il-Ħamrun, Qormi and Il-Marsa
- Triq Diċembru Tlettax (13 December Road) – leading from Il-Marsa to Blata l-Bajda (Il-Ħamrun) and Floriana, Malta/Valletta
- Triq it-Tiġrija (Racecourse Street) – leading from Il-Marsa to Albert Town
- Triq Aldo Moro (Aldo Moro Street) – leading from Il-Marsa and Albert Town to Marsa Industrial Estate, Addolorata and Paola, Malta
- Triq il-Labour (Labour Road) – leading from Albert Town to Paola, Malta and Ħal Luqa
- Triq il-Gvern Lokali (Local Government Street) – leading from Ħal Luqa to Ħal Qormi and Albert Town
- Triq Ġużè Gatt (G. Gatt Street) – leading from Marsa Industrial Estate to Ħal Qormi and Albert Town
- Triq Giuseppe Garibaldi (Garibaldi Avenue) – leading from Paola, Malta and Addolorata to Ħal Luqa, Santa Luċija and Malta International Airport
- Triq il-Kunsill tal-Ewropa (Council of Europe Street) – leading from Ħal Tarxien and Santa Luċija to Ħal Luqa and Malta International Airport
- Vjal l-Avjazzjoni (Aviation Avenue) – leading from Ħal Luqa to Malta International Airport and Il-Gudja
- Triq Ħal Far (Ħal Far Road) – leading from Malta International Airport and Il-Gudja to Ħas-Saptan (Ħal Għaxaq) and Ħal Far
- Triq Ħal Far, Birżebbuġa (Ħal Far Road) – leading from Ħal Far to Birżebbuġa and Malta Freeport
- Kalafrana (Calafrana) – Malta Freeport (Birżebbuġa)

=== Route 5 ===
From Tal-Qroqq (L-Imsida) to Il-Mosta

- University Roundabout, Tal-Qroqq – next to the University of Malta
- Triq Dun Karm (Birkirkara Bypass), L-Imsida/Birkirkara – leading from Tal-Qroqq, Swatar, University of Malta and Mater Dei Hospital to Birkirkara, L-Iklin, Lija and Balzan
- Lija Roundabout – the main roundabout between Lija, Balzan, L-Iklin and Birkirkara
- Triq in-Naxxar (Naxxar Road, Lija/L-Iklin – leading from Birkirkara, Lija, Balzan and L-Iklin to In-Naxxar
- Triq il-Mosta (Mosta Road), Lija/In-Naxxar – leading from Lija, L-Iklin and In-Naxxar to Mosta Techno Park
- Triq Valletta (Valletta Road), Il-Mosta – leading from Mosta Techno Park to Il-Mosta centre.

=== Route 6 ===
From Blata l-Bajda (Il-Ħamrun) to Valletta

- Triq Nazzjonali (National Road), Blata l-Bajda – leading from Il-Ħamrun and Il-Marsa to Floriana, Malta
- Triq Sant' Anna (St. Anne's Street) – leading from Floriana, Malta to Valletta

=== Route 7 ===
From Mrieħel (Ħal Qormi) to Għajn Qajjet (Ir-Rabat)

- Triq is-Sebħ (Mrieħel Bypass), Ħal Qormi – leading from Marsa-Ħamrun Bypass and Santa Venera Tunnels to Ħal Qormi (St. George's Parish area)
- Dawret l-Imrieħel (Mrieħel Bypass), Mrieħel – leading from Ħal Qormi to Birkirkara and Ħal Balzan
- Triq l-Imdina (Notabile Road), Ħal Balzan – leading from Mrieħel and Birkirkara to Ħal Balzan and Ħ'Attard (San Anton Palace area)
- Triq il-Belt Valletta (Valletta Road), Ħ'Attard – leading from Ħal Balzan and San Anton Palace area to Ħ'Attard
- Triq in-Nutar Żarb (Notary Zarb Street), Ħ'Attard – leading from Ħ'Attard centre to Ħal Warda area
- Triq iż-Żagħfran (Saffron Street), Ħ'Attard – leading from Ħal Warda area to Ta' Qali
- Triq l-Imdina (Mdina Road), Ħ'Attard – leading from Ħ'Attard to Ta' Qali, Mdina and Ir-Rabat
- Triq Buqana (Buqana Road), Ir-Rabat – leading from Ta' Qali and Ħaż-Żebbuġ to Mdina, L-Imtarfa and Il-Mosta
- Triq il-Kavallier Vincenzo Bonello (Chev. V. Bonello Street), L-Imtarfa – leading from Buqana and Tal-Infetti areas to L-Imtarfa
- Triq il-Maltin Internati u Eżiljati (Mtarfa Bypass), L-Imtarfa – leading from L-Imtarfa to Ir-Rabat (Għajn Qajjet and Nigret areas)

=== Route 8 ===
From Għajn Dwieli (Paola, Malta) to Il-Ħamrun

- Għajn Dwieli roundabout – crossroad between Paola, Malta, Il-Fgura, and Bormla
- Triq Kordin (Corradino Road) – leading from Għajn Dwieli and Corradino to Paola, Malta (Our Lady of Lourdes Parish Church)
- Vjal Sir Paul Boffa (Sir Paul Boffa Avenue) – leading from Paola, Malta to Il-Marsa
- Triq Giuseppe Garibaldi (Garibaldi Avenue) – leading from Il-Marsa to Ħal Luqa and Santa Luċija
- Triq il-Kunsill tal-Ewropa (Council of Europe Street) – leading from Santa Luċija to Ħal Luqa and Malta International Airport
- Triq San Tumas (St. Thomas Street), Ħal Luqa – leading from Malta International Airport to Ħal Farruġ
- Triq Ħal Qormi (Qormi Road), Ħal Farruġ – leading from Ħal Farruġ and Ħal Luqa to Għammieri and Ħal Qormi
- Triq Ħal Luqa (Luqa Road), Ħal Qormi – leading from Għammieri and Ħal Farruġ to Ħal Qormi
- Tal-Imgħallaq Roundabout – crossroad between Ħal Qormi, Il-Marsa, Ħal Luqa and Ħaż-Żebbuġ
- Triq Manwel Dimech (Manoel Dimech Street), Ħal Qormi – leading from Ħal Qormi (St. Sebastian's Parish area) to Il-Marsa
- Triq Ħal Qormi (Qormi Road), Il-Marsa – leading from Il-Marsa to Il-Ħamrun

=== Route 9 ===
From Addolorata Cemetery (Paola, Malta) to Malta International Airport (Ħal Luqa)

- Vjal Santa Luċija (St. Lucia Avenue), Paola, Malta – leading from Il-Marsa and Paola, Malta to Santa Luċija and Ħal Tarxien
- Mintoff Roundabout – crossroad between Paola, Malta, Ħal Tarxien, Santa Luċija and Ħal Luqa
- Triq Tal-Barrani (Tal-Barrani Road), Ħal Tarxien – leading from Ħal Tarxien and Santa Luċija to Bulebel and Iż-Żejtun
- Triq Tal-Barrani (Tal-Barrani Road), Iż-Żejtun – leading from Bulebel and Iż-Żejtun to Bir id-Deheb and Ħal Għaxaq
- Dawret Ħal Għaxaq (Għaxaq Bypass), Ħal Għaxaq – leading from Bir id-Deheb to Il-Gudja
- Triq Ħal Għaxaq (Għaxaq Road), Il-Gudja – leading from Ħal Għaxaq to Il-Gudja (Palazzo Bettina area)
- Dawret il-Gudja (Gudja Bypass), Il-Gudja – leading from Il-Gudja to Malta International Airport and Ħal Luqa

=== Route 16 ===
From Ħad-Dingli to Buġibba

- Triq ir-Rabat (Rabat Road), Ħad-Dingli – leading from Ħad-Dingli to Buskett
- Triq Ħad-Dingli (Dingli Road), Ir-Rabat – leading from Buskett to Ir-Rabat (Għar Barka area)
- Triq Ħal Tartarni (Ħal Tartarni Road), Ir-Rabat – leading from Għar Barka area to St. Dominic area
- Triq il-Kulleġġ (College Street), Ir-Rabat – leading from Tal-Virtù and St. Dominic area to Mdina and Ir-Rabat centre
- Triq Nikola Saura (Saura Street), Ir-Rabat – leading from Ir-Rabat centre to Mdina
- Telgħa tas-Saqqajja ( Saqqajja Hill), Mdina – leading from Ir-Rabat and Mdina to Ta' Qali, Ħ'Attard and Ħaż-Żebbuġ
- Triq Tal-Infetti (Infetti Road), Mdina – leading from Mdina to Ta' Qali, Buqana and Chadwick Lake
- Triq Buqana (Buqana Road), Ir-Rabat – leading from Mdina and L-Imtarfa to Il-Mosta and L-Imġarr
- Triq Ta' Żejfa (Ta' Żejfa Road), Il-Mosta – leading from Ta' Qali and L-Imġarr to Ta' Żokkrija, Mount St. Joseph and Tarġa Gap areas in Il-Mosta
- Triq il-Missjunarji Maltin (Maltese Missioners Street), Il-Mosta – leading from Ta' Żokkrija and Bistra areas to Tarġa Gap and Burmarrad
- Vjal Millbrae (Millbrae Avenue), Il-Mosta – leading from Tarġa Gap and Il-Mosta to Bidnija and Burmarrad
- Triq Burmarrad (Burmarrad Avenue), Burmarrad – leading from Bidnija and Burmarrad to Wardija, Buġibba and San Pawl il-Baħar
- Triq Toni Camilleri (T. Camilleri Street), Burmarrad – next to Burmarrad Parish Church

=== Route 17 ===
From L-Imġarr to Il-Mosta

- Triq iż-Żebbiegħ (Żebbiegħ Road), L-Imġarr – leading from L-Imġarr to Żebbiegħ
- Triq l-Imġarr (Mġarr Road), L-Imġarr – leading from Żebbiegħ to Il-Mosta and Ta' Qali
- Triq San Pawl tal-Qliegħa, Il-Mosta – leading from Ta' Qali and Chadwick Lake to Il-Mosta (Blata l-Għolja area)
- Triq il-Kbira (Main Street), Il-Mosta – leading from Blata l-Għolja and Ta' Mellu to Mosta Rotunda, Il-Mosta main square.

=== Route 18 ===
From Kappara (San Ġwann) to Tarġa Gap (Il-Mosta)

- Triq Birkirkara (B'Kara Road), San Ġwann – leading from San Ġiljan and Tas-Sliema to Kappara (San Ġwann)
- Triq in-Naxxar (Naxxar Road), San Ġwann – leading from Kappara to San Ġwann centre
- Vjal ir-Riħan (Riħan Avenue), San Ġwann – leading from San Ġwann to Ta' Żwejt and Ħal Għargħur
- Triq Tal-Balal (Tal-Balal Road), San Ġwann/Ħal Għargħur – leading from Ta' Żwejt and San Ġwann to Ħal Għargħur, Xwieki and In-Naxxar
- Triq il-Parroċċa (Parish Street), In-Naxxar – leading from Ħal Għargħur and L-Iklin to In-Naxxar centre
- Vjal il-Ħaddiem (Labour Avenue), In-Naxxar – leading from In-Naxxar centre to Ħal Lija and Mosta Techno Park
- Triq Valletta (Valletta Road), Il-Mosta – leading from Mosta Techno Park to Il-Mosta centre (Tad-Daqqaq and Sgħajtar areas)
- Vjal l-Indipendenza (Independence Avenue), Il-Mosta – leading from Tad-Daqqaq and Sgħajtar areas to Blata l-Għolja and Ta' Mlit areas in Il-Mosta
- Triq il-Kbira (Main Street), Il-Mosta – leading from Blata l-Għolja to Il-Mosta centre
- Triq il-Kostituzzjoni (Constitution Street), Il-Mosta – leading from Il-Mosta centre to Tarġa Gap and Ta' Żokkrija

=== Route 19 ===
From Santa Venera to Birkirkara

- Triq il-Ferrovija l-Qadima (Old Railway Track) – leading from Il-Ħamrun and L-Imsida to Birkirkara and Fleur de Lys, Malta
- Triq Salvu Psaila (Psaila Street) – leading from Santa Venera to Birkirkara centre

=== Route 20 ===
From San Anton Palace (Ħ'Attard) to Fleur de Lys, Malta

- Triq Birbal (Birbal Street), Ħal Balzan – leading from Ħ'Attard to Birkirkara
- Triq il-Wied (Valley Road), Birkirkara – leading from Ħal Balzan to Birkirkara centre, L-Imsida and Santa Venera
- Triq Fleur de Lys (Fleur de Lys Road), Birkirkara – leading from Birkirkara Valley to Fleur de Lys, Malta, Santa Venera and Ħal Qormi (Mrieħel area)

=== Route 21 ===
From Ħal Qormi (St. Sebastian's Parish area) to Ta' Qali

- Triq Ġuże' Duca (Duca Road), Ħal Qormi – leading from St. Sebastian's Parish area to Ta' Paskarella and Ħandaq
- Triq l-Imdina (Mdina), Ħal Qormi/Ħaż-Żebbuġ – leading from Il-Marsa and Ħal Qormi to Ta' Qali, Ħ'Attard, Ir-Rabat and Mdina

=== Route 22 ===
From Tal-Qroqq (L-Imsida) to Blata l-Bajda

- University Roundabout, L-Imsida – crossroad between Birkirkara, Swatar, Il-Gżira, L-Imsida and San Ġwann
- Triq Mikiel Anton Vassalli (M.A. Vassalli Street), L-Imsida – leading from University of Malta and Tal-Qroqq to L-Imsida centre
- Pjazza 5 ta' Ottubru (Msida Strand), L-Imsida – the main square of L-Imsida, leading to Il-Gżira, Ta' Xbiex, Santa Venera and Birkirkara
- Misraħ Ġuże' Ellul Mercer (Ellul Mercer Square or Msida Marina), L-Imsida – leading from L-Imsida and Ta' Xbiex to Pieta, Malta and Birkirkara
- Triq il-Marina (Marina Street), Pieta, Malta – leading from L-Imsida to Floriana, Malta, Il-Ħamrun and Blata l-Bajda
- Triq l-Indipendenza (Independence Street), Blata l-Bajda – leading from Pieta, Malta and Sa Maison to Blata l-Bajda, Floriana, Malat and Valletta

=== Route 23 ===
From Tal-Ħawli (Il-Birgu) to Fort St. Leonard (Ħaż-Żabbar)

- Triq il-Kottonera (Cottonera Road), Tal-Ħawli, Il-Birgu – leading from Notre Dame Gate (Ħaż-Żabbar) to Bormla and Il-Birgu
- Triq San Dwardu (St. Edward's Road), Fortini, Il-Birgu – leading from Il-Birgu and Bormla to Il-Kalkara
- Triq Santa Liberata (Santa Liberata Road), Il-Kalkara – leading from Santa Liberata area (Il-Kalkara) to Smart City Malta, Fort Rinella and Fort Ricasoli
- Triq Santu Rokku (St. Roque Road), Il-Kalkara – leading from Santa Liberata area (Il-Kalkara) to St. Peter's and Ix-Xgħajra
- Triq San Leonardu (St. Leonard's Road), Ħaż-Żabbar – leading from St. Peter's to Ix-Xgħajra and Ħaż-Żabbar (Tal-Maġġi area)

=== Route 24 ===
From Corradino (Paola, Malta to Bormla

- Triq Għajn Dwieli (Għajn Dwieli Road), Paola, Malta – leading from Il-Fgura and Paola, Malta to Bormla
- Triq it-Tlett Ibliet (Three Cities Road), Bormla – leading from Għajn Dwieli to Bormla (San Ġwann t'Għuxa area)
- Triq San Franġisk (St. Frances Street), Bormla – leading from San Ġwann t'Għuxa to Bormla centre and Senglea
- Fuq San Pawl (St. Paul's Street), Bormla – leading to Bormla main square
- Misraħ Gavino Gulia (Gulia Square), Bormla – Bormla main square
- Ix-Xatt ta' Bormla (Cospicua Waterfront), Bormla – leading from Bormla to Il-Birgu
- Triq it-8 ta' Diċembru (8 December Road), Bormla – leading from Bormla and Il-Birgu to Il-Kalkara
- Triq il-Kottonera (Cottonera Road), Il-Birgu – leading from Il-Birgu to Ħaż-Żabbar and Tal-Ħawli
- Triq San Nikola (St. Nicholas Road), Bormla – leading from Tal-Ħawli (Il-Birgu) to Verdala (Bormla) and Il-Fgura
- Triq San Ġwann t'Għuxa (San Ġwann t'Għuxa Road), Bormla – leading from Verdala to Għajn Dwieli, Paola, Malta and Senglea

=== Route 25 ===
From Ħaż-Żebbuġ to Ħ'Attard

- Triq Ħ'Attard (Attard Road), Ħaż-Żebbuġ – leading from Ħal Muxi area (Ħaż-Żebbuġ) to Ħ'Attard
- Triq Ħaż-Żebbuġ (Żebbuġ Road), Ħ'Attard – leading from Ħal Warda area (Ħ'Attard) to Ħaż-Żebbuġ

=== Route 26 ===
From Bulebel to Marsaskala

- Triq San Anard (St. Leonard's Road), Ħal Tarxien – leading from Ħal Għaxaq and Il-Gudja to Bulebel Industrial Estate and Il-Fgura
- Triq id-Dejma (Dejma Road), Il-Fgura – leading from Ħal Tarxien to Ħaż-Żabbar (Buleben iż-Żgħir area) and Iż-Żejtun
- Triq l-10 ta' Settembru, 1797 (Taċ-Ċawsli), Ħaż-Żabbar – leading from Bulebel to Il-Fgura and Ħaż-Żabbar (Hompesch Arch)
- Triq il-Mina ta' Hompesch (Hompesch Arch Street), Ħaż-Żabbar – leading from Il-Fgura to Ħaż-Żabbar centre
- Triq Villabate (M'Skala Bypass), Ħaż-Żabbar – leading from Ħaż-Żabbar to Marsaskala
- Triq Sant' Antnin (M'Skala Bypass), Marsaskala – leading from Sant' Antnin Family Park to Marsaskala Bay

=== Route 27 ===
From Ħaż-Żebbuġ to Is-Siġġiewi

- Triq is-Siġġiewi (Siġġiewi Road), Ħaż-Żebbuġ/Is-Siġġiewi – leading from Ħaż-Żebbuġ (Rohan Arch) to Is-Siġġiewi (Siġġiewi Bypass)

=== Route 28 ===
From Malta International Airport (Ħal Luqa) to Il-Qrendi

- Il-Mina ta' Ħal Kirkop (Kirkop Tunnels), Ħal Luqa/Ħal Kirkop – leading from Ħal Luqa and Il-Gudja to Ħal Kirkop
- Triq l-Industrija (Industry Street), Ħal Kirkop – leading from Ħal Kirkop to Iż-Żurrieq and L-Imqabba
- Triq l-Imqabba (Mqabba Road), L-Imqabba – the main road to L-Imqabba from Ħal Kirkop
- Triq il-Konvoj ta' Santa Marija (Mqabba Bypass), L-Imqabba – leading from L-Imqabba centre to Il-Qrendi
- Triq il-Qrendi (Qrendi Road), L-Imqabba – the main road to Il-Qrendi from L-Imqabba

=== Route 29 ===
From Bir id-Deheb (Iż-Żejtun) to Qajjenza (Birżebbuġa)

- Triq Għar Dalam (Għar Dalam Road), Ħal Għaxaq/Birżebbuġa – leading from Iż-Żejtun, Ħal Għaxaq and Marsaxlokk to Birżebbuġa

=== Route 30 ===
From Bir id-Deheb (Iż-Żejtun) to Delimara (Marsaxlokk)

- Triq Marsaxlokk (M'Xlokk Road), Marsaxlokk- leading from Iż-Żejtun and Ħal Għaxaq to Marsaxlokk (Marnisi area)
- Triq iż-Żejtun (Żejtun Road), Marsaxlokk – leading from Marnisi area to Marsaxlokk centre
- Triq Melqart (Melqart Street), Marsaxlokk – leading to Ħal Ġinwi and Tas-Silġ areas
- Triq Axtart (Astarte Street), Marsaxlokk – leading to Ħal Ġinwi area
- Triq Bir Rikka (Bir Rikka Road), Marsaxlokk – leading from Marsaxlokk centre to Tas-Silġ and Delimara
- Triq il-Power Station (Power Station Road), Marsaxlokk – leading from Tas-Silġ to Delimara Power Station

=== Route 31 ===
From Ħal Kirkop to Iż-Żurrieq

- Triq il-Belt Valletta (Valletta Road), Iż-Żurrieq – leading from Ħal Kirkop and L-Imqabba to Iż-Żurrieq, Ħal Safi, Bubaqra and Blue Grotto

=== Route 32 ===
From Ħal Kirkop to Ħal Safi

- Triq Dun Ġwann Barbara, Ħal Kirkop – leading from Valletta Road (Iż-Żurrieq) to Ħal Kirkop centre
- Triq San Ġwann (St. John's Street), Ħal Kirkop/Ħal Safi – leading from Ħal Kirkop (St. Benedict's area) to Ħal Safi centre

=== Route 33 ===
From Ħal Safi to Malta International Airport

- Triq Tal-Aħwar (Tal-Aħwar Road), Ħal Safi – leading from Ħal Safi to Ħal Kirkop
- Triq iż-Żurrieq (Żurrieq Road), Ħal Safi – leading from Ħal Safi outskirts to Medavia (Safi Apron)
- Triq Carmelo Caruana (C. Caruana Street), Ħal Kirkop – leading from Ħal Kirkop to Malta International Airport
- Triq l-Industrija (Industry Street), Ħal Kirkop – leading to Malta International Airport, Ħal Luqa, Il-Gudja and L-Imqabba

=== Route 34 ===
From Grand Harbour (Paola, Malta) to Notre Dame Gate (Ħaż-Żabbar)

- Telgħa ta' Ras Ħanżir (Ras Ħanżir Hill), Corradino, Paola, Malta – leading from Corradino Industrial Estate to Għajn Dwieli
- Triq l-Isqof Buhagiar (Bishop Buhagiar Street), Paola, Malta – leading from Għajn Dwieli to Paola, Malta
- Vjal it-28 ta' April (28 April Avenue), Paola, Malta – leading from Paola, Malta to Il-Fgura
- Triq Ħaż-Żabbar (Żabbar Road), Il-Fgura – leading from Il-Fgura (Tal-Liedna area) to Bormla, Senglea and Ħal Tarxien
- Triq Hompesch (Hompesch Road), Il-Fgura – leading from Il-Fgura (Tal-Gallu area) to Ħaż-Żabbar and Iż-Żejtun
- Triq il-Mina ta' Hompesch (Hompesch Arch Street), Ħaż-Żabbar – leading from Bulebel to Ħaż-Żabbar centre and Marsaskala
- Triq Tal-Labour (Labour Road), Ħaż-Żabbar – leading from Ħaż-Żabbar to Il-Birgu and Il-Kalkara

=== Route 114 ===
From Qammieħ (Ċirkewwa) to Aħrax (Marfa) in Il-Mellieħa

- Triq Tad-Dahar (Tad-Dahar Road), Ċirkewwa – leading from Qammieħ to Red Tower (It-Torri l-Aħmar)
- Triq l-Aħrax (Aħrax Road), Marfa, Il-Mellieħa – leading from Red Tower to Aħrax Point.
- Triq Ramlet (Armier Road), Marfa, Il-Mellieħa – leading from Aħrax to Armier Bay
- Triq Daħlet ix-Xmajjar (Daħlet ix-Xmajjar Road), Il-Mellieħa – leading from Aħrax Point to Armier Redoubt (Ramla tat-Torri)

=== Route 115 ===
From Għadira Beach (Il-Mellieħa) to Manikata

- Triq Tal-Prajjet (Anchor Bay Road), Il-Mellieħa – leading from Għadira Beach (Mellieħa Bay) to Popeye Village (Anchor Bay)
- Road in Majjistral Park, Il-Mellieħa – leading from Għajn Żnuber Tower and Manikata to Popeye Village (Anchor Bay)

=== Route 116 ===
From Pwales (Xemxija, San Pawl il-Baħar) to Selmun Palace (Il-Mellieħa)

- Triq Għajn Tuffieħa (Għajn Tuffieħa Road), Xemxija – leading from Pwales, Xemxija and San Pawl il-Baħar to Mbordin and Għajn Tuffieħa
- Triq il-Miżieb (Miżieb Road), Il-Mellieħa – leading from Mbordin and Miżieb to Il-Mellieħa
- Triq Louis Wettinger (L. Wettinger Street), Il-Mellieħa – leading from Ta' Pennellu to Il-Mellieħa centre.
- Triq Selmun (Selmun Road), Il-Mellieħa – leading from Il-Mellieħa centre to Selmun Palace

=== Route 117 ===
From Ta' Pennellu (Il-Mellieħa) to Ħal Far (Birżebbuġa)

- Triq il-Mellieħa (Mellieħa Road), Manikata – leading from Il-Mellieħa (Ta' Pennellu area) to Manikata
- Triq il-Mejjiesa (Mejjiesa Road), Manikata – leading from Manikata to Għajn Tuffieħa
- Triq il-Knisja l-Qadima (Old Church Street), Manikata – leading from Manikata centre to Għajn Tuffieħa
- Triq il-Manikata (Manikata Road), Manikata – leading from Manikata to Golden Bay
- Triq Tal-Wilġa (Wilġa Road), Għajn Tuffieħa – leading from Golden Bay to Għajn Tuffieħa Tower (Riviera Bay)
- Triq Għajn Tuffieħa (Golden Bay Road), L-Imġarr – leading from Għajn Tuffieħa to Għajn Tuffieħa Roman Baths and Ta' Mrejnu
- Triq il-Banjijiet Rumani (Roman Baths Road), L-Imġarr – leading from Ta' Mrejnu to L-Imġarr
- Triq Binġemma (Binġemma Road), L-Imġarr – leading from L-Imġarr and Żebbiegħ to Fort Binġemma
- Triq Tas-Salib (Tas-Salib Road), Ir-Rabat – leading from Fort Binġemma to Fiddien
- Triq Għajn Qajjet (Għajn Qajjet Road), Ir-Rabat – leading from Fiddien to Ir-Rabat (Nigret area)
- Vjal il-Ħaddiem (Labour Avenue), Ir-Rabat – leading from Nigret to Għar Barka in Ir-Rabat
- Triq Ħal Tartarni (Ħal Tartarni Road), Ir-Rabat – leading from Għar Barka and Ħad-Dingli to Ir-Rabat (St. Domenic's area)
- Triq il-Buskett (Buskett Road), Ir-Rabat – leading from Ir-Rabat to Buskett
- Trejqet Inżul ix-Xemx (Sunset Path), Ħad-Dingli – leading from Buskett to Dingli Cliffs
- Triq Panoramika (Panoramic Street), Ħad-Dingli – leading from Dingli Cliffs to Girgenti Palace and Ġebel Ciantar
- Triq Blat il-Qamar (Moon Rocks Street), Is-Siġġiewi – leading from Girgenti Palace to Is-Siġġiewi
- Triq Ta' Bur il-Kbir (Bur il-Kbir Road), Is-Siġġiewi – leading from Is-Siġġiewi (Wies Ħesri area) to Fawwara
- Triq Tal-Providenza (Tal-Providenza Road), Is-Siġġiewi – leading from Is-Siġġiewi and Fawwara to Tal-Providenza
- Triq Lapsi (Għar Lapsi Road), Is-Siġġiewi – leading from Tal-Providenza to Għar Lapsi
- Triq Wied iż-Żurrieq, Is-Siġġiewi/Il-Qrendi – leading from Għar Lapsi to Ħaġar Qim
- Triq Panorama (Panorama Street), Il-Qrendi – leading from Ħaġar Qim to Blue Grotto (Malta) and Wied iż-Żurriq Tower
- Triq il-Wied (Valley Road), Iż-Żurrieq – leading from Blue Grotto (Malta) to Iż-Żurrieq (Nigret area)
- Vjal il-Blue Grotto (Blue Grotto Avenue), Iż-Żurrieq – leading from Nigret area to Iż-Żurrieq centre
- Vjal ix-Xarolla (Xarolla Avenue), Iż-Żurrieq – leading from Iż-Żurrieq to Ħal Safi, Bubaqra and Xarolla Windmill
- Triq Sant' Andrija (St. Andrew's Street), Bubaqra – leading from Xarolla Windmill to Ħal Far
- Triq Ħal Far (Ħal Far Road), Bubaqra – leading from Iż-Żurrieq and Bubaqra to Ħal Far

=== Route 118 ===
From Madliena (Is-Swieqi) to Għajn Tuffieħa

- Telgħa tal-Madliena (Madliena Hill), Is-Swieqi – leading from Madliena to Victoria Lines, Ħal Għargħur
- Triq il-Madliena (Madliena Road), Ħal Għargħur – leading from Victoria Lines to Ħal Għargħur.
- Triq Caravaggio (Caravaggio Street), Ħal Għargħur – leading to Ħal Għargħur centre
- Triq il-31 ta' Marzu (31 March Street), Ħal Għargħur – Ħal Għargħur centre
- Triq San Bartilmew (St. Bartolomeo Street), Ħal Għargħur – leading from Ħal Għargħur centre to In-Naxxar
- Triq San Ġwann (St. John's Street), Ħal Għargħur – leading from Ħal Għargħur to In-Naxxar
- Triq M. Murray (Murray Street), In-Naxxar – leading from In-Naxxar and L-Iklin to Birguma
- Triq San Pawl (St. Paul's Street), In-Naxxar – leading from In-Naxxar to San Pawl tat-Tarġa
- Triq Andrea Debono (Andrea Debono Street), In-Naxxar – leading from San Pawl tat-Tarġa to Birguma
- Triq Jean Houel (Houel Street), In-Naxxar – leading from Birguma to Magħtab
- Telgħa T'Alla u Ommu (T'Alla u Ommu Hill), In-Naxxar – leading from In-Naxxar to Salina and Qawra
- Triq Burmarrad (Burmarrad Road), In-Naxxar – leading from Magħtab to Burmarrad
- Triq Burmarrad (Burmarrad Road), Burmarrad – leading from Burmarrad to Wardija, Buġibba and San Pawl il-Baħar
- Triq il-Wardija (Wardija Road), Burmarrad – leading from Burmarrad to Wardija Ridge
- Triq Busewdien (Busewdien Road), Wardija – leading from Wardija to Żebbiegħ and L-Imġarr
- Triq San Martin (San Martin Road), San Martin, San Pawl il-Baħar – leading from L-Imġarr to Xemxija

=== Route 119 ===
From Birguma (In-Naxxar) to Santa Margarita (Il-Mosta)

- Triq il-Fortizza tal-Mosta (Fort Mosta Road), In-Naxxar/Il-Mosta – leading from Birguma (In-Naxxar) to Fort Mosta and Santa Margarita
- Vjal il-Qalbiena Mosta (Mosta Heroes Avenue), Il-Mosta – leading from Santa Margarita to Sgħajtar (Il-Mosta)

=== Route 120 ===
From Kennedy Grove (Qawra) to San Pawl tat-Tarġa (In-Naxxar)

- Triq is-Salina (Salina Road) (known also as Telgħa t'Alla u Ommu (T'Alla u Ommu Hill)), In-Naxxar – leading from Kennedy Grove and Salina to In-Naxxar and Magħtab

=== Route 121 ===
From Qalet Marku (Baħar iċ-Ċagħaq) to Magħtab

- Triq ir-Ramla (Ramla Road), In-Naxxar – leading from Coast Road (Baħar iċ-Ċagħaq) to Magħtab centre
- Triq il-Kappella ta' Santa Marija (St. Mary's Chapel Street), In-Naxxar – leading from Magħtab centre to In-Naxxar (T'Alla u Ommu Hill)
- Triq l-Arżnu (Arżnu Street), In-Naxxar – side street leads to T'Alla u Ommu Hill

=== Route 122 ===
From Tarġa Gap (Il-Mosta) to Żebbiegħ(L-Imġarr)

- Triq il-Bidnija (Bidnija Road), Il-Mosta – leading from Tarġa Gap, Il-Mosta to Bidnija centre
- Triq il-Bidnija (Bidnija Road), Bidnija/L-Imġarr – leading from Bidnija centre to Żebbiegħ and L-Imġarr
- Triq Sir Temi Żammit (Sir T. Zammit Road), L-Imġarr – leading from Żebbiegħ to L-Imġarr (Ta' Mrejnu area) and Għajn Tuffieħa

=== Route 123 ===
From Żebbiegħ (L-Imġarr) to Ġnejna Bay

- Triq Fisher (Fisher Street), L-Imġarr – leading from Żebbiegħ to L-Imġarr centre.
- Triq il-Kurat Chetcuti (Chetcuti Street), L-Imġarr – passes from L-Imġarr centre.
- Wesgħa tal-Ġublew (Jubilee Square), L-Imġarr – L-Imġarr main square
- Triq il-Kbira (Main Street), L-Imġarr – leading from L-Imġarr centre to Lippija Tower and Santi
- Triq il-Ġnejna (Ġnejna Road), L-Imġarr – leading from L-Imġarr (Zammitello Palace area) to Ġnejna Bay

=== Route 124 ===
From Fiddien (Ir-Rabat) to Lippija Tower (L-Imġarr)

- Il-Pont tal-Fiddien (Fiddien Bridge), Ir-Rabat – leading from Fiddien to Bieb ir-Ruwa
- Bieb ir-Ruwa, Ir-Rabat – leading from Bieb ir-Ruwa and Ir-Rabat to Baħrija, Kunċizzjoni and Għermieri
- Triq is-Santi (Santi Road), Ir-Rabat/L-Imġarr – leading from Baħrija and Ir-Rabat to Santi and L-Imġarr

=== Route 125 ===
From Bieb ir-Ruwa (Ir-Rabat) to Baħrija

- Triq is-Sajf ta' San Marin (St. Martin's Summer Street), Baħrija – leading from Ir-Rabat, Bieb ir-Ruwa and Kunċizzjoni to Baħrija

=== Route 126 ===
From Fiddien (Ir-Rabat) to Mtaħleb

- Il-Pont tal-Fiddien (Fiddien Bridge), Ir-Rabat – leading from Ir-Rabat to Mtaħleb and Baħrija
- Triq l-Imtaħleb (Mtaħleb Road), Ir-Rabat – leading from Fiddien to Mtaħleb and Miġra l-Ferħa

=== Route 127 ===
From Paceville to L-Imsida

- Triq Gort (Gort Street), San Ġiljan – leading from Is-Swieqi to Paceville
- Triq San Ġorġ (St. George's Road), San Ġiljan – leading from Paceville to San Ġiljan (Spinola area) and Portomaso
- Ix-Xatt ta' Spinola (Spinola Square), San Ġiljan – San Ġiljan centre
- Triq Ġorġ Borġ Olivier (George Borg Olivier Street), San Ġiljan – leading from San Ġiljan to Balluta Bay
- Triq il-Kbira (Main Street), San Ġiljan – leading from Balluta Bay to Tas-Sliema (Exiles area)
- Triq it-Torri (Tower Road), Tas-Sliema – leading from Exiles to Tas-Sliema (Għar id-Dud area)
- Ix-Xatt (The Strand), Tas-Sliema – leading from Tas-Sliema (Ferries area) to Il-Gżira and Manoel Island
- Triq ix-Xatt (Gżira Strand), Il-Gżira – leading from Il-Gżira to Ta' Xbiex
- Ix-Xatt ta' Ta' Xbiex (Ta' Xbiex Strand), Ta' Xbiex – leading from Il-Gżira to L-Imsida
- Triq Abate Rigord (Abate Rigord Street), Ta' Xbiex – leading from Ta' Xbiex to L-Imsida

=== Route 128 ===
From L-Imsida to Kappara (San Ġwann)

- Triq d'Argens (Rue d'Argens), L-Imsida/Il-Gżira – leading from L-Imsida to Il-Gżira (Savoy area), Ta' Xbiex and Tas-Sliema
- Triq il-Prinċipessa Margarita (Princess Margareth Street), L-Imsida/Ta' Xbiex – leading from L-Imsida (Rue d'Argens) to Ta' Xbiex centre
- Triq l-Imrabat (Mrabat Road), Tas-Sliema – leading from Il-Gżira to Balluta Bay and San Ġiljan
- It-Telgħa ta' Birkirkara (B'Kara Hill), San Ġiljan – leading from Balluta Bay and Tas-Sliema to Kappara and San Ġwann

=== Route 129 ===
From Kappara (San Ġwann) to Misraħ Lewża

- Triq Tas-Sliema (Sliema Road or Kappara Hill), San Ġwann – leading from Kappara and Il-Gżira to San Ġwann centre
- Triq Bellavista (Bellavista Road), San Ġwann – leading from San Ġwann centre to Misraħ Lewża and Ta' Żwejt areas in San Ġwann

=== From 130 ===
From Blata l-Bajda to San Anton Palace (Ħ'Attard)

- Triq Nazzjonali (National Road), Blata l-Bajda – leading from Floriana, Malta to Il-Ħamrun and Il-Marsa
- Triq il-Kbira San Ġużepp (St. Joseph High Street), Il-Ħamrun – leading from Blata l-Bajda to Il-Ħamrun, Gwardamanġa and Santa Venera
- Triq il-Kbira San Ġużepp (St. Joseph High Street), Santa Venera – leading from Il-Ħamrun to Birkirkara, Fleur-de-Lys, Malta, Mrieħel and Ħal Qormi
- Triq l-Imdina (Notabile Road), Birkirkara – leading from Fleur-de-Lys, Malta to Ħ'Attard and Ħal Balzan
- Triq l-Imdina (Mdina Road), Ħal Balzan/Ħ'Attard – leading from Birkirkara and Mrieħel to San Anton Palace and Ħ'Attard centre
- Vjal de Paule (De Paule Avenue), Ħal Balzan/Ħ'Attard – leads to San Anton Palace main entrance and Ħal Balzan centre.

=== Route 131 ===
From Nigret (Ir-Rabat) to Dingli Cliffs (Ħad-Dingli)

- Triq Santa Katarina (Santa Katarina Road), Ir-Rabat – leading from Ir-Rabat (Nigret area) to Santa Katarina and Raba' Nemel
- Triq Misraħ Suffara (Misraħ Suffara Road), Ħad-Dingli – leading from Raba' Nemel and Ħofret ir-Ritz to Ħad-Dingli
- Triq San Pawl tal-Pitkali (San Pawl tal-Pitakli Road), Ħad-Dingli – leading from Ħad-Dingli centre to Dingli Cliffs and Simblija
- Triq Panoramika (Panoramic Street), Ħad-Dingli – leading from Dingli Cliffs to Girgenti and Is-Siġġiewi

=== Route 132 ===
From Tal-Virtù (Ir-Rabat) to Albert Town (Il-Marsa)

- Triq Tal-Virtù (Tal-Virtù Road), Ir-Rabat – leading from Ir-Rabat to Tal-Virtù and Ħaż-Żebbuġ (Gianpula area)
- Triq it-Tiġrija (Racecourse Street), Is-Siġġiewi – leading from Ir-Rabat to Girgenti and Is-Siġġiewi
- Triq Blat il-Qamar (Moon Rocks Street), Is-Siġġiewi – leading from Girgenti to Is-Siġġiewi (Ta' Ħesri area)
- Triq it-Tabib Nikol Żammit (Dr. N. Zammit Street), Is-Siġġiewi – leading from Ta' Ħesri to Is-Siġġiewi centre
- Triq Santa Margarita (St. Margarita Street), Is-Siġġiewi – leads to Siġġiewi Bypass
- Triq Mons. Mikiel Azzopardi (Siġġiewi Bypass), Is-Siġġiewi – leading from Ħaż-Żebbuġ to Is-Siġġiewi
- Triq l-Imqabba (Mqabba Road), Is-Siġġiewi – leading from Is-Siġġiewi to L-Imqabba and Ta' Kandja
- Triq Tas-Sejba (Sejba Road), L-Imqabba – leading from Ta' Kandja to L-Imqabba centre
- Triq Ta' Ħal Farruġ (Ħal Farruġ Road), Is-Siġġiewi/Ħal Luqa – leading from Is-Siġġiewi and L-Imqabba to Ħal Farruġ
- Triq l-Ingiered (Ingiered Road), Ħal Luqa – leading from Ħal Farruġ to St. Vincent de Paul Residence and Ħal Qormi
- Triq l-Għammieri (Marsa Old Racing Track), Il-Marsa – leading from Ħal Qormi to Albert Town, Malta

=== Route 133 ===
From Mdina to Gianpula (Ħaż-Żebbuġ)

- Triq it-Tiġrija (Racecourse Street), Ir-Rabat – leading from Mdina and Saqqajja (Ir-Rabat) to Gianpula and Is-Siġġiewi
- Triq Gianpula (Gianpula Street), Ħaż-Żebbuġ – leading from Ir-Rabat to Gianpula area and Ħaż-Żebbuġ

=== Route 134 ===
From Bulebel (Iż-Żejtun) to Żonqor Tower (Marsaskala)

- Triq Bormla (Cospicua Road) or Taċ-Ċawsli, Iż-Żejtun – leading from Il-Fgura and Bulebel to Iż-Żejtun (Ġebel San Martin area)
- Triq Alfredo Cachia Żammit (A. Cachia Zammit Street), Iż-Żejtun – leading from Ġebel San Martin to Iż-Żejtun centre
- Vjal il-25 ta' Novembru (25 November Avenue), Iż-Żejtun – leading from Iż-Żejtun to Tal-Barrani
- Triq Tal-Barrani (Tal-Barrani Road), Iż-Żejtun – leading from Ħal Tarxien and Santa Luċija to Ħal Għaxaq and Bir id-Deheb
- Triq il-President Anton Buttiġieġ (President A. Buttigieg Street), Iż-Żejtun – leading from Ħal Għaxaq and Bir id-Deheb to Ta' San Girgor (Iż-Żejtun)
- Triq Dun Lawrenz Degabriele (Degabriele Street), Iż-Żejtun – next to Żejtun Roman Villa
- Triq id-Daħla ta' San Tumas (St. Thomas Bay Road), Iż-Żejtun/Marsaskala – leading from Iż-Żejtun (Ta' San Girgor and Ħal Tmin) to Marsaskala (St. Thomas Bay area)
- Triq Tal-Gardiel (Tal-Gardiel Road), Marsaskala – next to St. Thomas Bay
- Triq il-Qaliet (Qaliet Street), Marsaskala – leading from St. Thomas Bay to Marsaskala
- Triq Sant' Antnin (St. Anthony's Road), Marsaskala – leading from Marsaskala Bay to Bellavista and Ħaż-Żabbar
- Triq Sant' Anna (St. Anne's Street), Marsaskala – leads to Marsaskala centre
- Triq ix-Xatt (Marina Street), Marsaskala – leading from Marsaskala centre to Marsaskala Bay
- Triq iż-Żonqor (Żonqor Road), Marsaskala – leading from Marsaskala centre to Żonqor Tower
- Dawret il-Kunsill tal-Ewropa (Council of Europe Square), Marsaskala – the proposed site of the American University of Malta

=== Route 135 ===
From Tal-Ħawli (Il-Birgu) to Ix-Xgħajra

- Triq San Dwardu (St. Edwards' Road), Il-Birgu – leading from Il-Birgu to Tal-Ħawli and Il-Kalkara
- Triq Santa Duminka (St. Domenica Street), Ħaż-Żabbar – leading from Tal-Ħawli and Bormla to Ħaż-Żabbar
- Triq Tal-Labour (Labour Road), Ħaż-Żabbar – leading from Cottonera to Ħaż-Żabbar centre and Il-Fgura
- Misraħ il-Madonna Medjatriċi (Matrix Place), Ħaż-Żabbar – the main square of Ħaż-Żabbar centre
- Triq Hompesch (Hompesch Road), Ħaż-Żabbar – leading to Żabbar Primary School
- Triq il-Kunvent (Convent Street), Ħaż-Żabbar – leading from Ħaż-Żabbar centre to St Peter's
- Triq is-Santwarju (Sanctuary Street), Ħaż-Żabbar – leading from St Peter's and Ix-Xgħajra to Żabbar Sanctuary Museum
- Triq ix-Xgħajra (Xgħajra Road), Ħaż-Żabbar – leading from Ħaż-Żabbar and St Peter's to Ix-Xgħajra

=== Route 137 ===
From Iż-Żejtun to Delimara

- Triq ir-Ramla (Ramla Road), Iż-Żejtun – leading from Iż-Żejtun to Ħal Tmin
- part of Triq id-Daħla ta' San Tumas (St. Thomas Bay Road), Iż-Żejtun – leading from Marsaskala to Misraħ Strejnu (Iż-Żejtun)
- Triq Strejnu (Strejnu Road), Iż-Żejtun – leading from Ħal Tmin and Marsaxlokk to Iż-Żejtun (San Niklaw area)
- Triq Xrobb l-Għaġin (Xrobb l-Għaġin Road), Iż-Żejtun – leading from Iż-Żejtun to Xrobb l-Għaġin Tower, Tas-Silġ and Marsaxlokk
- Triq Delimara (Delimara Road), Marsaxlokk – leading from Tas-Silġ to Delimara (Delimara Lighthouse) and St. Peter's Pool

=== Route 138 ===
From Marsaxlokk to Għar Dalam (Birżebbuġa)

- Triq Axtart (Astarte Street), Marsaxlokk
- Triq Melqart (Melqart Street), Marsaxlokk
- Triq Bir Rikka (Bir Rikka Road), Marsaxlokk
- Triq il-Power Station (Power Station Road), Marsaxlokk
- Triq il-Wilġa (Wilġa Road), Marsaxlokk
- Xatt is-Sajjieda (Fishermen's Strand), Marsaxlokk
- Triq Tat-Trunċiera (Trunċiera Road), Marsaxlokk
- Triq il-Qajjenza (Qajjenza Road), Birżebbuġa
- Triq F.M. Ferretti (F.M. Ferretti Street), Birżebbuġa

=== Route 139 ===
From Is-Siġġiewi to Ħaġar Qim (Il-Qrendi)

- Triq Ta' Kilpa (Ta' Kilpa Road), Is-Siġġiewi – leading from Is-Siġġiewi to Ħal Xluq and Il-Qrendi
- Triq Maddorbu (Maddorbu Road), Il-Qrendi – leading from Ħal Xluq to Il-Qrendi
- Triq is-Siġġiewi (Siġġiewi Road), Il-Qrendi – leading from Misraħ is-Sinjura area to il-Qrendi centre
- Triq l-Imqabba (Mqabba Road), Il-Qrendi – leading from Il-Qrendi to L-Imqabba
- Triq it-Tempesta (Tempest Street), Il-Qrendi- leading from L-Imqabba and Il-Qrendi to Maqluba
- Misraħ tal-Maqluba (Maqluba Square), Il-Qrendi – the main square of Maqluba
- Triq Ħaġar Qim (Ħaġar Qim Road), Il-Qrendi – leading from Maqluba and Il-Qrendi to Ħaġar Qim and Mnajdra

=== Route 140 ===
From Tal-Providenza (Is-Siġġiewi) to Għar Lapsi

- Triq Għar Lapsi (Għar Lapsi Road), Is-Siġġiewi – leading from Is-Siġġiewi (Tal-Providenza area) to Għar Lapsi and Xaqqa Valley

=== Route 141 ===
From Ħal Far to Birżebbuġa

- Triq Tal-Ġebel (Tal-Ġebel Road), Birżebbuġa – leading from Ħal Far to Birżebbuġa (Parish Church area)

=== Route 142 ===
From Bengħisa Battery to Għar Ħasan

- Triq Tal-Karmnu (Our Lady of Carmelo Street), Birżebbuġa – leading from Birżebbuġa (Tal-Papa area) to Bengħisa Battery and Għar Ħasan
- Triq Għar Ħasan (Għar Ħasan Road), Birżebbuġa – leading from Għar Ħasan to Ħal Far

=== Route 143 ===
From Malta Freeport to Kalafrana

- Triq Kalafrana (Calafrana Road), Birżebbuġa – leading from Malta Freeport and Birżebbuġa to Kalafrana (Oil Tanking facilities)

=== Route 144 ===
From Qajjenza (Birżebbuġa) to Malta Freeport

- Triq Birżebbuġa (B'Bugia Road), Birżebbuġa – leading from Qajjenza and Għar Dalam to Birżebbuġa centre
- Triq San Ġorġ (St. George's Bay), Birżebbuġa – the main road of St George's Bay (Il-Bajja ta' San Ġorġ)
- Dawret il-Qalb Imqaddsa (Sacred Heart Promenade), Birżebbuġa – leading from St George's Bay to Pretty Bay
- Triq il-Bajja s-Sabiħa (Pretty Bay), Birżebbuġa – leading from Birżebbuġa centre to Tal-Papa area
- Misraħ is-Summit (Summit Square), Birżebbuġa – the main bus terminus of Birżebbuġa
- Triq San Patrizju (St. Patrick's Street), Birżebbuġa – leading from Birżebbuġa (Pretty Bay) to Malta Freeport and Ħal Far

== Route Network in Gozo ==
=== Route 1 ===
From Mġarr, Gozo (Għajnsielem) to Dwejra (San Lawrenz)

- Triq ix-Xatt (Gozo Ferry), Mġarr, Gozo
- Triq l-Imġarr (Mġarr Road), Għajnsielem
- Triq l-Imġarr (Mġarr Road), Ix-Xewkija
- Triq Fortunato Mizzi (F. Mizzi Street), Victoria, Gozo
- Triq ir-Repubblika (Republic Street), Victoria, Gozo
- Pjazza Indipendenza (Independence Square) or it-Tokk, Victoria, Gozo
- Triq Sant' Orsla (St. Ursula Street), Victoria, Gozo
- Triq il-Papa Ġwanni Pawlu II (Pope John Paul II Street), Victoria, Gozo
- Triq l-Għarb (Għarb Road), L-Għarb
- Triq Franġisk Portelli (F. Portelli Street), L-Għarb
- Triq San Lawrenz (St. Lawrence Road), San Lawrenz
- Pjazza San Lawrenz (St. Lawrence Square), San Lawrenz
- Triq id-Duluri (Our Lady of Sorrows Street), San Lawrenz
- Triq Ta' Ċangura (Ciangura Road), San Lawrenz
- Triq il-Ġebla tal-Ġeneral (Fungus Rock Road), San Lawrenz

=== Route 2 ===
From Mġarr, Gozo (Għajnsielem) to Victoria, Gozo

- Triq Sant' Antnin (St. Anthony's Road), Mġarr, Gozo
- Triq l-Imġarr (Mġarr Road), In-Nadur
- Triq Xandriku (Xandriku Street), In-Nadur
- Triq il-Knisja (Church Street), In-Nadur
- Triq it-Tiġrija (Racecourse Street), In-Nadur
- Triq ir-Rabat (Victoria Road), In-Nadur
- Triq Ta' Xħajma (Ta' Xħajma Road), In-Nadur/Ix-Xewkija
- Triq Ta' Ħamet (Ta' Ħamet Road), Ix-Xagħra/Ix-Xewkija
- Triq San Leonardu (St. Leonard Road), Ix-Xewkija
- Triq Ta' Viani (Viani Road), Victoria, Gozo
- Triq l-Ewropa (Europe Street), Victoria, Gozo
- Triq Sir Luigi Camilleri (Sir L. Camilleri Street), Victoria, Gozo
- Triq Ta' Wara s-Sur (Behind the Bastions Street), Victoria, Gozo
- Triq l-Imgħallem (Foreman Street), Victoria, Gozo

=== Route 3 ===
From Victoria, Gozo to Marsalforn (Żebbuġ, Gozo)

- Triq il-Kapuċċini (Capuchin Street), Victoria, Gozo
- Triq Marsalforn (M'Forn Road), Victoria, Gozo
- Triq ir-Rabat (Victoria Road), Marsalforn
- Triq Lapsi (Lapsi Street), Marsalforn
- Triq il-Wied (Valley Road), Marsalforn

=== Route 4 ===
From Ix-Xewkija to Ix-Xagħra

- Triq ix-Xagħra (Xagħra Road), Ix-Xewkija – leading from Ix-Xewkija (Għajn Lukin) to Ta' Ħamet
- Triq Ta' Ħamet (Ta' Ħamet Road), Ix-Xagħra – leading from Ix-Xewkija and Ta' Ħamet to Ġgantija
- Vjal it-8 ta' Settembru (8 September Avenue), Ix-Xagħra – leading from Ġgantija to Ix-Xagħra centre

=== Route 10 ===
From Victoria, Gozo to Ix-Xlendi (Il-Munxar)

- Triq Gedrin (Gedrin Street), Victoria, Gozo – leading from L-Għarb and L-Għasri to Victoria, Gozo centre
- Triq id-Dawwara (Dawwara Street), Victoria, Gozo – leading from Ta' Kerċem to Victoria, Gozo centre
- Triq Vajrinġa (Vajrinġa Street), Victoria, Gozo – leading from Victoria, Gozo centre to Fontana, Gozo
- Pjazza San Franġisk (St. Frances Square), Victoria, Gozo – Victoria, Gozo centre main square
- Triq l-Arċisqof Pietru Pace (Archbishop Pietro Pace Street), Victoria, Gozo – leading from Victoria, Gozo centre to Gozo General Hospital and Cittadella (Gozo)
- Triq Santa Marta (St. Martha Street), Victoria, Gozo – leading from Victoria, Gozo to Ix-Xewkija and Ix-Xagħra
- Triq l-Isptar San Ġiljan (St. Julian's Hospital Street), Victoria, Gozo – leading from Victoria, Gozo to Fontana, Gozo
- Triq Tal-Għajn (Spring Street), Fontana, Gozo – leading from Victoria, Gozo (Vajringa area) to Ix-Xlendi and Il-Munxar
- Triq ix-Xlendi (Xlendi Road), Fontana, Gozo – leading from Fontana, Gozo to Ix-Xlendi
- Triq ir-Rabat (Victoria Road), Ix-Xlendi – leading from Ix-Xlendi centre to Fontana, Gozo and Victoria, Gozo
- Pjazza l-Anfori (Anfori Square), Ix-Xlendi – the main square of Ix-Xlendi

=== Route 11 ===
From Ta' Kerċem to Żebbuġ, Gozo

- Triq Wied il-Lunzjata (Lunzjata Valley Road), Ta' Kerċem – leading from Ta' Kerċem to Victoria, Gozo
- Triq Ta' Kerċem (Kerċem Road), Victoria, Gozo – leading from Ta' Kerċem outskirts to Victoria, Gozo centre
- Triq Mons. Vella (Mgr. Vella Street), Victoria, Gozo – leading to Cittadella (Gozo)
- Triq Sant' Orsla (St. Ursula Street), Victoria, Gozo – leading from Cittadella (Gozo) to Victoria, Gozo outskirts
- Triq il-Papa Ġwanni Pawlu II (Pope John Paul II Street), Victoria, Gozo – leading from Victoria, Gozo to L-Għasri, L-Għarb and San Lawrenz
- Triq l-Għasri (Għasri Road), L-Għasri – leading from Ta' Kerċem to L-Għasri
- Triq il-Wilġa (Wilġa Road), L-Għasri – L-Għasri centre
- Triq iż-Żebbuġ (Żebbuġ Road), L-Għasri – leading from L-Għasri to Iż-Żebbuġ
- Triq iż-Żebbuġ (Żebbuġ Road), Iż-Żebbuġ – leading from Wied Sara to Iż-Żebbuġ centre
- Triq il-Knisja (Church Street), Iż-Żebbuġ – leading to Iż-Żebbuġ Parish Church
- Triq l-Imgħallem (Foreman Street), Iż-Żebbuġ – leading from Victoria, Gozo to Iż-Żebbuġ

=== Route 12 ===
From Ix-Xewkija to Victoria, Gozo

- Triq il-Mitħna (Mill Street), Ix-Xewkija – leading from Ta' Ħamet to Ix-Xewkija centre
- Triq Tal-Ħamrija (Ħamrija Road), Ix-Xewkija – leading from Ix-Xewkija centre to Xewkija Industrial Estate
- Triq Ta' Sannat (Sannat Road), Ix-Xewkija – leading from Xewkija Industrial Estate to Ta' Sannat and Mġarr ix-Xini
- Triq ix-Xewkija (Xewkija Road), Ta' Sannat – leading from Ta' Sannat to Ix-Xewkija
- Triq Ta' Marżiena (Manresa Road), Ta' Sannat – leading from Ta' Sannat to Il-Munxar
- Triq Santa Duminka (St. Domenica Street), Il-Munxar/Fontana, Gozo – leading from Il-Munxar to Fontana, Gozo and Victoria, Gozo
- Triq il-Kappillan Ġużeppi Hili (Chaplin Joseph Hili Street), Victoria, Gozo – leading from Fontana, Gozo to Victoria, Gozo
- Triq Enrico Mizzi (Enrico Mizzi Street), Victoria, Gozo – leading to Victoria, Gozo centre
- Pjazza San Franġisk (St. Frances Square), Victoria, Gozo – Victoria main square
- Triq Għajn Qatet (Għajn Qatet Road), Victoria, Gozo – leading from Victoria, Gozo centre to Ix-Xewkija

=== Route 13 ===
From Victoria, Gozo to Ta' Sannat

- Triq Putirjal (City Gate Street), Victoria, Gozo – leading from Cittadella (Gozo) to Victoria, Gozo centre
- Pjazza San Franġisk (St. Frances Square), Victoria, Gozo – Victoria, Gozo centre main square
- Triq Enrico Mizzi (Enrico Mizzi Street), Victoria, Gozo – leading from Victoria, Gozo to Fontana, Gozo and Taċ-Ċawla area
- Triq it-Tabib Anton Tabone (Dr. Anton Tabone Street), Victoria, Gozo – leading from Taċ-Ċawla area to Ta' Sannat
- Triq Ta' Sannat (Sannat Road), Victoria, Gozo/Ta' Sannat – leading to Ta' Sannat centre and Ta' Ċenċ Cliffs
- Triq Dun Xand Aquilina (Rev. X. Aquilina Street), Ta' Sannat – leading from Ta' Sannat centre to Ta' Seguna area and Il-Munxar

=== Route 15 ===
From Mġarr, Gozo to Ramla Bay (Ix-Xagħra)

- Triq l-Imġarr (Mġarr Road), Il-Qala – leading from Mġarr, Gozo to Il-Qala and Ħondoq ir-Rummien
- Triq l-Isqof M. Buttiġieġ (Bishop Buttigieg Street), Il-Qala – leading to Il-Qala centre
- Triq it-Tempju (Temple Street), Il-Qala – leading from Il-Qala centre to Ta' Grunju and In-Nadur
- Triq Ta' Grunju (Grunju Road), Il-Qala – leading from Il-Qala outskirts to Wied is-Simar and In-Nadur
- Pjazza Repubblika (Republic Square), Il-Qala – crossroad between Il-Qala and In-Nadur
- Triq il-Qala (Qala Road), In-Nadur – leading from Il-Qala to In-Nadur and Daħlet Qorrot
- Triq it-Tiġrija (Racecourse Street), In-Nadur – leading from Daħlet Qorrot and San Blas, Nadur areas to In-Nadur centre and Ta' Kuxxina
- Triq il-Knisja (Church Street), In-Nadur – leading from In-Nadur centre to Ta' Ħida area and Victoria, Gozo
- Triq Tal-Ħanaq (Ħanaq Road), In-Nadur – leading from In-Nadur centre to Binġemma area
- Triq Għajn Qasab (Għajn Qasab Road), In-Nadur – leading from Binġemma area to Ramla Bay
- Triq ir-Ramla l-Ħamra (Ramla Bay Road), Ix-Xagħra – leading to Ramla Bay beach

=== Route 100 ===
From L-Għarb to L-Għasri

- Pjazza Gerano (Gerano Square), L-Għarb – L-Għarb centre
- Triq Ta' Sdieri (Sdieri Road), L-Għarb – leading from L-Għarb to Ta' Pinu
- Triq Ta' Għammar (Għammar Road), L-Għasri – leading from Ta' Pinu to Għammar
- Triq il-Fanal (Lighthouse Street), L-Għasri – leading from Għammar and Ta' Gurdan Lighthouse to L-Għasri
- Pjazza s-Salvatur (Our Saviour Square), L-Għasri – L-Għasri main square
- Triq Salvu Gambin (S. Gambin Street), L-Għasri – leading from L-Għasri to Iż-Żebbuġ and Victoria, Gozo

=== Route 102 ===
From L-Għarb to Ta' Pinu

- Triq Ta' Pinu (Ta' Pinu Road), L-Għarb – leading from L-Għarb and Victoria, Gozo to Ta' Pinu

=== Route 103 ===
From Żebbuġ, Gozo to Ix-Xagħra

=== Route 106 ===
From Ta' Kerċem to Santa Luċija, Gozo

=== Route 107 ===
From Ta' Kerċem to Għajn Abdul

=== Route 112 ===
From Ix-Xewkija to Mġarr ix-Xini

=== Route 113 ===
From Xlendi (Il-Munxar) to Ta' Ċenċ (Ta' Sannat)

=== Route 114 ===
From Ix-Xagħra to Ramla Bay

These are the main roads and highways of Malta by locality:

== Attard ==
- B'Kara Road (Triq Birkirkara)- the road leading from Balzan and Birkirkara to Attard centre.
- Hal Warda Road (Triq Ħal Warda) – the road leading from the outskirts of Attard, Mdina Road, to Attard centre.
- Mdina Road (Triq l-Imdina) – the road leading from Birkirkara and Balzan to Ta' Qali, Rabat, Malta and Mdina.
- National Stadium Avenue (Vjal l-Istadium Nazzjonali)- the road leading from Żebbuġ, Malta, Rabat, Malta and Mdina to Ta' Qali.
- Notary Zarb Street (Triq in-Nutar Zarb) – the road leading from Attard to Balzan, San Anton Palace area, Birkirkara and Mrieħel.
- Old Railway Track (Triq il-Linja) – the road leading from San Anton Palace area to Attard centre.
- Pitakli Street (Triq il-Pitkali) – the road leading from Attard centre to Misrah Kola and Ta' Qali.
- St. Catherine Street (Triq Santa Katarina) – the road leading from Attard centre to Tal-Mirakli area, Lija and Mosta.
- Tat-Torba Road (Triq Tat-Torba) – the road leading from Attard to Lija and Naxxar.
- Zaghfran Street (Triq iż-Żagħfran) – This road connects Mdina Road with Notary Zarb Street.
- Żebbuġ Road (Triq Ħaż-Żebbuġ) – The road leading from Attard to Żebbuġ, Malta and Siġġiewi.
- Tigan Street (Triq it-Tigan)

== Balzan ==
- Birbal Street (Triq Birbal) – the road leading from Attard to Birkirkara.
- De Paule Avenue (Vjal de Paule) – the road leading from Balzan outskirts, Aqueduct area, to San Anton Palace and Balzan Centre.
- Mdina Road (Triq l-Imdina) – This road is also known as Notabile Road. The road leading to Balzan from Fleur-de-Lys and Mrieħel, Birkirkara, and Qormi.

== Birgu ==
- '79 Street (Triq '79) – the road leading from Bormla to Birgu centre
- Cottonera Road (Triq il-Kottonera) – the main road of Tal-Hawli area.
- St. Edward's Road (Triq San Dwardu) – the road leading from Żabbar to Birgu and Kalkara.
- Vittoriosa Waterfront (Xatt il-Forn) – the road leading from Birgu centre to Cottonera Marina.

== Birkirkara ==
- Birkirkara Bypass (Dawret Birkirkara) – This road also known as Triq Dun Karm. This is the busiest road in Malta that connects Birkirkara, the most populated locality in Malta, with Lija, Balzan, Iklin, Naxxar, Mosta and the northern part of Malta from one side. And from the other side connects Birkirkara with Gharghur, San Ġwann, Swatar, Msida, Mater Dei Hospital, University of Malta and the centre part and the southern part of Malta.
- Fleur-de-Lys Road (Triq Fleur-de-Lys) – the road leading from Birkirkara to Fleur-de-Lys, Santa Venera, Ħamrun, Mrieħel and Qormi.
- Mannarino Road (Triq Mannarinu) – the road leading from Birkirkara Valley to Ta' Paris, Swatar and Msida.
- Naxxar Road (Triq in-Naxxar) – the road leading from Birkirkara Valley to Balzan, Lija, Iklin, Naxxar and Birkirkara Bypass.
- Notabile Road (Triq Notabile) – This street is also known as Mdina Road. The road leading from Ħamrun, Santa Venera and Birkirkara to Attard, Balzan, Mrieħel and Rabat, Malta.
- Psaila Street (Triq Salvu Psaila) – the road leading from Birkirkara to Santa Venera and Regional Road.
- Valley Road (Triq il-Wied) – the road that connects different areas of Birkirkara altogether, like Ta' Paris, Fleur-de-Lys and Mrieħel. This road also connects Birkirkara with Balzan.

== Birżebbuġa ==
- B'Bugia Road (Triq Birżebbuġa)- The main road leading to Birżebbuġa centre.
- Ferretti Street (Triq F.M. Ferretti) – the road leading from Ghar Dalam area to Qajjenza and Marsaxlokk.
- Ghar Dalam Road (Triq Għar Dalam) – This road known also as Żejtun Road. The road leading to Żejtun, Għaxaq and Tal-Barrani Road.
- Hal Far Road (Triq Ħal Far) – The main road of Hal Far. The road leading from Malta Freeport to Malta International Airport, Luqa, Gudja, and Żurrieq.
- Pretty Bay Road – The road leading from Pretty Bay to Birżebbuġa Centre
- Qajjenza Road (Triq il-Qajjenza) – the road leading from Birżebbuġa to Marsaxlokk and Delimara.
- Sacred Heart Promenade (Dawret il-Qalb Imqaddsa) – the road leading from St. George's Bay to Pretty Bay.
- St. Patrick's Road (Triq San Patrizju) – the road leading from Birżebbuġa to Malta Freeport and Hal Far.

== Bormla ==
- 8 December Road (Triq it-8 ta' Diċembru) – the main road between Birgu and Bormla, serve also as the main Cottonera bus terminus.
- Cospicua Waterfront (Ix-Xatt ta' Bormla) – the road leading from Bormla centre to Fgura and Senglea.
- Immaculate Street (Triq l-Immakulata) – the road leading from Bormla centre to Verdala and San Ġwann t'Ghuxa area.
- San Ġwann t'Ghuxa Road (Triq San Ġwann t'Għuxa) – the road leading from San Ġwann t'Ghuxa area to Senglea and Paola, Malta
- Silver Jubilee Road (Triq il-Ġublew tal-Fidda) – the main road that leads to Bormla from Tal-Hawli area.
- Three Cities Road (Triq it-Tlett Ibliet) – the road leading from Paola, Malta to Bormla and Senglea.

== Dingli ==
- Main Street (Triq il-Kbira) – the main road of Dingli centre.
- Panoramic Street (Triq Panoramika) – the road leading from Dingli Cliffs to Siġġiewi, Girgenti and Fawwara.
- Rabat Road (Triq ir-Rabat) – the road leading from Dingli centre to Buskett, Rabat, Malta and Mdina.
- Turretta Street (Triq it-Turretta) – the road leading from Dingli centre to Dingli Cliffs.

== Fgura ==
- Dejma Road (Triq id-Dejma) – the road leading to Tarxien, Bulebel and Żejtun.
- Hompesch Road (Triq Hompesch) – the road leading from Fgura to Żabbar, Marsaskala and Żejtun.
- Żabbar Road (Triq Ħaż-Żabbar) – the road leading from Fgura to Cottonera area and Paola, Malta.

== Floriana ==
- Floriana's Victims Street (Triq il-Vittmi Furjaniżi) – the road leading from Valletta Waterfront to Marsa, Malta. The main road for cruise liners terminal.
- Independence Road (Triq l-Indipendenza) – the road leading from Floriana and Blata l-Bajda to Pieta', Malta, Msida and Sliema.
- Lascaris Wharf (Xatt ta' Lascaris) – the main road that connect Floriana with Valletta from the harbor side.
- National Road (Triq Nazzjonali) – the road leading from Floriana to Ħamrun, Marsa, Malta and the South of Malta.
- Pinto Wharf (Xatt ta' Pinto) – the road leading from Valletta Waterfront to Floriana centre and Valletta main terminus.
- St. Anne Street (Triq Sant' Anna) – the road leading from Valletta to Floriana centre and Blata l-Bajda.

== Gharghur ==
- Tal-Balal Road (Triq Tal-Balal) – the road leading from San Ġwann to Naxxar and Iklin.

== Għaxaq ==
- Għaxaq Bypass (Dawret Ħal Għaxaq) – the road leading to Tal-Barrani Road and Żejtun from one side, and from the other side to Gudja, Luqa, and Malta International Airport.

== Gudja ==
- Għaxaq Road (Triq Ħal Għaxaq) – the road leading from Gudja to Għaxaq.
- Gudja Bypass (Dawret il-Gudja) – the road leading to Luqa, Malta International Airport, Hal Far and Kirkop.
- Tarxien Road (Triq Ħal Tarxien) – the road leading from Gudja to Tarxien and Tal-Barrani Road.

== Gżira ==
- Gzira Strand (Triq ix-Xatt) – the road leading from Ta' Xbiex and Gżira to Sliema.
- Msida Road (Triq l-Imsida) – the road leading from Msida and Ta' Xbiex to Gzira.
- Rue d'Argens (Triq d'Argens) – This is the main road of Gzira, connecting Msida with Sliema (Mrabat area) and San Ġiljan.
- Sliema Road (Triq Tas-Sliema) – This road is also known as Kappara Hill. This road connect Gzira with San Ġwann, Kappara, Regional Road and University of Malta area.

== Ħamrun ==
- Mountbatten Street (Triq Mountbatten) – This street is also known as Joe Sciberras Street. This street connects Ħamrun with Pietà, Malta and Guardamangia.
- Parish Priest Mifsud Street (Triq il-Kappillan Mifsud) – This street connects Ħamrun (Immaculate Conception Parish area) with Santa Venera and Birkirkara. This street also leads to Regional Road.
- St. Joseph High Street (Triq il-Kbira San Ġużepp) – The principle road of Ħamrun, known also as Strada Rjali (Royal Street). This road, that starts from Blata l-Bajda, connecting Valletta with Santa Venera, Birkirkara (Malta largest city), Attard, Qormi and other cities in the centre of Malta.

== Iklin ==
- Geronimo Abos Street (Triq Geronimo Abos) – the main road of Lower Iklin. The road leading from Birkirkara Bypass to Iklin centre.
- Valley Road (Triq il-Wied) – the main road of Upper Iklin. The road leading from Iklin centre to Naxxar, Għargħur and San Ġwann.

== Kalkara ==
- Italian Mission Street (Triq il-Missjoni Taljana) – the road leading from Rinella Bay to Smart City
- Kalkara Strand (Ix-Xatt) – the road leading from Birgu to Kalkara centre
- Marina Road (Triq il-Marina) – the road leading from Kalkara centre to Rinella Bay
- St. Rocco Street (Triq Santu Rokku) – the main road of Smart City
- Alexander barri bi qrun ta' cerva

== Kirkop ==
- Industry Road (Triq l-Industrija) – the road leading from Kirkop to Żurrieq and Mqabba.
- Kirkop Tunnels (Triq il-Mini ta' Ħal Kirkop) – the road leading from Kirkop to the Malta International Airport, Luqa and the South of Malta.

== Lija ==
- Mosta Road (Triq il-Mosta) – the road, after Lija Cemetery, leading from Lija and Iklin to Mosta and Naxxar.
- Naxxar Road (Triq in-Naxxar) – the road, before Lija Cemetery, leading from Lija and Iklin to Mosta and Naxxar.
- Pantar Road (Triq Pantar) – the road leading from Mosta and Naxxar to Ta' Qali and Attard.

== Luqa ==
- Aviation Avenue (Vjal l-Avjazzjoni) – the road connecting Luqa centre with the Malta International Airport, Hal Far, Gudja, and Kirkop.
- Council of Europe Street (Triq il-Kunsill tal-Ewropa) – the road leading from Luqa to Santa Luċija, Paola, Malta, and Marsa, Malta.
- Qormi Road (Triq Ħal Qormi) – the road leading from Hal Farrug to Qormi.
- St. Thomas Street (Triq San Tumas) – the road leading from Luqa centre to Malta International Airport, Hal Farrug, and Qormi.

== Marsa, Malta ==
- 13 December Road (Triq Diċembru Tlettax) – The road leading from Valletta and Floriana, Malta area to Marsa centre and Albert Town.
- Aldo Moro Street (Triq Aldo Moro) – This road that connects the south of Malta with Valletta Harbor area is also known as Trunk Road or Millennia Road. This road connects Marsa with Qormi, Luqa, Paola and the Malta International Airport.
- Belt il-Hazna Road (Triq Belt il-Ħażna) – the road leading from Albert Town to the Menqa area, the Valletta Harbor.
- Coal Wharf (Moll il-Faħam) – one of the busiest wharfs in Malta.
- Flagstone Wharf (Moll iċ-Ċangaturi) – the wharf leading from the Menqa area, Valletta Harbor, to Marsa centre.
- Ghammieri Road (Triq l-Għammieri) – This road known also as Ingiered Street. The road leading from Albert Town and Marsa Sports Complex to Marsa Industrial Estate and Qormi.
- Labour Road (Triq il-Labour) – the road connecting Marsa, Albert Town area, with Paola, Malta.
- Marsa Cross Street (Triq is-Salib tal-Marsa) – the main road of Marsa, Holy Trinity Parish area, leading from Albert Town to Marsa centre.
- Marsa-Ħamrun Bypass (Dawret il-Marsa u l-Ħamrun) – the bypass leading from Marsa to Qormi, Santa Venera tunnels, Ħamrun and the centre part of Malta.
- Wine Wharf (Triq l-Għassara tal-Għeneb) – the wharf leading from Marsa, Menqa area, to Floriana, Malta and Valletta Waterfront.

== Marsaskala ==
- Blajjiet Street (Triq il-Blajjiet) – the road leading from Żabbar to Zonqor.
- Marina Street (Triq ix-Xatt) – the main road of Marsaskala Bay.
- Qaliet Street (Triq il-Qaliet) – the main road of St. Thomas Bay.
- St. Anne Street (Triq Sant' Anna) – the main road between the new Marsaskala Bypass and the old one.
- St. Anthony Street (Triq Sant' Antnin) – the main road leading to Marsaskala Bypass in Żabbar.
- Tal-Gardiel Road (Triq Tal-Gardiel) – the road leading from St. Thomas Bay to Marsaskala Bay.
- Żabbar Road (Triq San Ġwakkin) – the road leading from Marsaskala to Żabbar, known also as the old bypass.
- Zonqor Road (Triq iż-Żonqor) – the road leading from Marsaskala to Zonqor.

== Marsaxlokk ==
- Fishermen Strand (Xatt is-Sajjieda) – the main road of Marsaxlokk
- Entrenchment Road (Triq it-Trunċiera) – the road leading from Marsaxlokk to Qajjenza and Birżebbuġa.
- Żejtun Road (Triq iż-Żejtun) – the road leading from Marsaxlokk to Żejtun and Tal-Barrani Road.

== Mdina ==
- Tal-Infetti Road (Triq Tal-Infetti) – the road leading from Buqana Road, Ta' Qali and Mosta to Rabat, Malta and Mdina area.

== Mellieħa ==
- George Borg Olivier Street (Triq Ġorġ Borġ Olivier) – the main road of Mellieħa centre.
- Louis Wettinger Street (Triq Louis Wettinger) – This road also known as the northern part of Mellieħa Bypass. This road connects Selmun area with Ta' Pennellu area in Mellieħa.
- Mellieħa Bypass (Dawret il-Mellieħa) – the road connects whole Malta with the northeast part of the island, such as Ċirkewwa, Marfa, Armier and Ghadira Bay. This is the most busiest road in Mellieħa. This road connects Malta with Gozo and Comino, because traffic has to pass from this bypass to catch the Gozo Ferry or the Comino and Kemmunett ferries. At this moment is under construction and people are using Anchor Bay Road.
- Main Street (Triq il-Kbira) – the road leading from Mellieħa outskirts, Belleview area, to Mellieħa centre.
- Marfa Road (Triq il-Marfa) – the road leading from Mellieħa centre to Ghadira Beach, Armier, Marfa, Ċirkewwa and Paradise Bay. During this road there is the Gozo Ferry and Comino and Cominotto ferries.
- Mellieħa Road (Triq il-Mellieħa) – the road leading from Mellieħa to Manikata and Għajn Tuffieħa.
- St. Paul's Bay Road (Triq San Pawl il-Baħar) – This road is also known as Xemxija Hill, Mistra Hill or Selmun Hill. The road leading from San Pawl il-Baħar to Mellieħa and Ċirkewwa.

== Mġarr ==
- Golden Bay Road (Triq Għajn Tuffieħa) – the road leading from Żebbiegħ to Għajn Tuffieħa, Manikata and Mellieħa.
- Mosta Road (Triq il-Mosta) – the road leading from Mġarr to Mosta, Ta' Qali and the centre of Malta.
- Roman Baths Street (Triq il-Banjijiet Rumani) – the road leading from Mġarr to Żebbiegħ, Għajn Tuffieħa and Manikata.
- Sir Temi Zammit Street (Triq Sir Temi Zammit) – the main road of Żebbiegħ.

== Mosta ==
- Constitution Street (Triq il-Kostituzzjoni) – the road leading from Mosta centre to Tarġa Gap, Burmarrad, Bidnija and the northern part of Malta.
- Durumblat Road (Triq Durumblat) – the road leading from Attard to Mosta, Ta' Mlit area, and Ta' Qali.
- Eucharistic Congress Street (Triq il-Kungress Ewkaristiku) – the road leading from Mosta centre to Mosta Technopark, Lija and Birkirkara areas.
- Frances Pisani Street (Triq Franġisk Pisani) – the road leading from Mosta, Sgħajtar area, to Naxxar, Mosta Technopark, Lija and Birkirkara.
- Independence Avenue (Vjal l-Indipendenza) – the road leading from Birkirkara, Lija, Iklin and the centre of Malta to Mosta, Ta' Mlit and Blata l-Għolja areas.
- Main Street (Triq il-Kbira) – the road leading from Naxxar, towards Mosta centre, then to Ta' Qali, and Mġarr.
- Maltese Missioners Street (Triq il-Missjunarji Maltin) – the road leading from Rabat, Malta, Mdina, Ta' Qali and Mġarr to Burmarrad, Bidnija, Mosta (Tarġa Gap and Ta' Żokkrija areas), and the northern part of Malta.
- Millbrae Avenue (Vjal Millbrae) – the road leading from Mosta, Tarġa Gap area, to Bidnija and Burmarrad.
- Mosta Heroes Avenue (Vjal il-Qalbiena Mostin) – the road leading from Mosta, Santa Margarita area, to Naxxar and Sgħajtar area.
- San Pawl tal-Qliegha Road (Triq San Pawl tal-Qliegħa) – the road leading from Mġarr and Rabat, Malta to Ta' Qali and Mosta, Tas-Sriedek area.
- St. Anton Abbot Street (Triq San Anton Abbati) – One of the roads that connect Mosta with Naxxar.
- Valletta Road (Triq Valletta) – the road leading from Mosta Technopark area to Naxxar, Iklin, Lija, Ta' Qali and the centre of Malta.

== Mqabba ==
- Mqabba Road (Triq l-Imqabba) – the road leading from Mqabba to Kirkop, Żurrieq and the Malta International Airport.
- Qrendi Road (Triq il-Qrendi) – the road leading from Mqabba to Qrendi and Ħaġar Qim.
- St. Mary's Convoy Road (Triq il-Konvoj ta' Santa Marija) – the main road of Mqabba that connects this locality with Qrendi.

== Msida ==
- M.A. Vassalli Street (Triq Mikiel Anton Vassalli) – Part of this street is also known as Regional Road. This road connects the south of Malta and Valletta area with San Ġwann, Birkirkara, Swieqi, University of Malta, Mater Dei Hospital, Santa Venera, Swatar and the north of Malta.
- Msida Strand (Ix-Xatt tal-Imsida) – this area is also known as Menqa Square, Msida Square, or 5 October Square. This is one of the busiest areas in Malta. This area connects the capital city, Valletta, area with Birkirkara, Ta' Xbiex, Mater Dei Hospital, University of Malta, Gżira, Sliema, Santa Venera and Regional Road.
- Msida Valley Road (Triq il-Wied tal-Imsida) – the road leading from Msida centre to Birkirkara, Santa Venera and Swatar.
- Rue d'Argens (Triq d'Argens) – the road leading from Msida to Ta' Xbiex, Gżira, Sliema, San Ġwann and San Ġiljan.

== Mtarfa ==
- Exiled Maltese Street (Triq il-Maltin Internati u Eżiljati) – This road is also known as Mtarfa Bypass. This road connects Mtarfa with Rabat, Malta, Mdina and the centre of Malta.
- Vincenzo Bonello Street (Triq il-Kavallier Vincenzo Bonello) – The road leading from Mtarfa Bypass to Buqana Road, Ta' Qali and Mosta.

== Naxxar ==
- 21 September Avenue (Vjal il-21 ta' Settembru) – the road leading from Naxxar centre to Sgħajtar and Santa Margarita areas and Mosta.
- Coast Road (Tul il-Kosta) – the main road leading from Sliema, San Ġiljan, Paceville, Swieqi, Madliena, Pembroke, Malta and the centre of Malta to Baħar ic-Cagħaq, Naxxar, San Pawl il-Baħar, Bugibba/Qawra and the northern part of Malta.
- Fort Mosta Street (Triq il-Fortizza tal-Mosta) – the road leading from Naxxar to Mosta, Santa Margarita and Tarġa Gap areas.
- Labour Avenue (Vjal il-Labour) – the main road of Naxxar. The road leading from Birkirkara, Iklin lower part, Lija, Mosta and the centre of Malta to Naxxar centre.
- M. Murray Street (Triq M. Murray) – the road leading from Naxxar centre, Iklin and San Ġwann to Birguma, Gharghur and T'Alla u Ommu Hill.
- Parish Street (Triq il-Parroċċa) – the road leading from San Ġwann, Iklin and Gharghur to Naxxar centre.
- St. Paul's Street (Triq San Pawl) – the main road leading from Naxxar centre, Iklin and Gharghur to San Pawl tat-Tarġa, Birguma, T'All u Ommu Hill, and the northern part of Malta.
- T'Alla u Ommu Hill (Telgħa T'Alla u Ommu) – This road is also known as Salini Road. The road leading from Naxxar to Magħtab, Salini, San Pawl il-Baħar, Bugibba/Qawra, Burmarrad and the northern part of Malta.

== Paola, Malta ==
- 28 April Avenue (Vjal it-28 ta' April) – This road known also as Il-Benniena. The road leading from Paola to Fgura.
- Corradino Road (Triq Kordin) – the main road of Corradino area, connecting Paola with Fgura and Marsa, Malta.
- Cospicua Road (Triq Bormla) – the road leading to Corradino Industrial Estate, MCAST, Għajn Dwieli and Cottonera area.
- Għajn Dwieli Road (Triq Għajn Dwieli) – the road leading from Paola to Bormla and Senglea.
- Paola Hill (Telgħat Raħal Ġdid) – the road leading from Paola centre to Corradino Industrial Estate and Harbor area.
- Paola Square (Pjazza Antoine de Paule) – the main road of Paola centre.
- Sir Paul Boffa Avenue (Vjal Sir Paul Boffa) – the road leading from Paola to Marsa, Malta.
- St. Lucia Avenue (Vjal Santa Luċija) – the road leading from Marsa, Malta to Santa Luċija, Tarxien and Tal-Barrani Road.
- Valletta Road (Triq il-Belt Valletta) – This road known also as Prison Street. The road leading from Paola centre to Ta' Lourdes area.

== Pembroke, Malta ==
- Profs. W. Ganado Street (Triq il-Profs. W. Ganado) – the road leading from Pembroke and St. Andrew's Road to Paceville and St. George's Bay.

== Pietà, Malta ==
- Marina Street (Triq ix-Xatt) – The main road that connects Valletta with the Marsamxett Harbour cities, like Sliema, Gżira, Ta' Xbiex and Msida. This street also connects Valletta with the University of Malta and Malta national hospital, Mater Dei Hospital.
- W. Bonnici Street (Triq W. Bonnici) – The road leading from Pieta', Sa Maison area, to Valletta, Blata l-Bajda and Ħamrun.

== Qormi ==
- Guze' Duca Street (Triq Ġużè Duca) – This road form part of Mdina Road, Qormi. This road connects Qormi with Tal-Handaq Industrial Estate.
- Luqa Road (Triq Ħal Luqa) – the road leading from Qormi to Hal Farrug, Luqa, the Malta International Airport and the south of Malta.
- Manuel Dimech Street (Triq Manwel Dimech) – the road leading from Ħamrun, Marsa Racecourse and Marsa Park and Ride to Qormi, St. Sebastian Parish, centre.
- Mdina Road (Triq l-Imdina) – the road leading from Marsa, Malta and Luqa to Żebbuġ, Malta, Siġġiewi, Rabat, Malta and north of Malta.
- Mill Street (Triq il-Mitħna) – the road leading from Qormi, St. George Parish, to Santa Venera and Birkirkara.
- Mrieħel Bypass (Dawret l-Imrieħel) – Part of this street is also known as Triq is-Sebħ. The road leading from Marsa, Malta, Marsa-Ħamrun Bypass, and Regional Road to Mrieħel, Attard, Balzan and the centre of Malta.

== Qrendi ==
- Ħaġar Qim Road (Triq Ħaġar Qim) – the road leading from Qrendi centre to Ħaġar Qim and Blue Grotto area.
- Tempest Street (Triq it-Tempesta) – the road leading from Qrendi to Mqabba or the Maqluba area.

== Rabat, Malta ==
- Buqana Road (Triq Buqana) – the road leading from Mdina Road, Żebbuġ, Malta, to Ta' Qali, Mosta and the north of Malta.
- College Street (Triq il-Kulleġġ) – the main road of Rabat, St. Dominic's area, that connect Rabat centre with Tal-Virtu'.
- Dingli Road (Triq Ħad-Dingli) – the road leading from Rabat to Dingli.
- Hal Tartarni Road – the road leading from Rabat centre to Buskett.
- Saqqajja Hill (Triq Ħal Tartarni) – the road leading from Valletta and the centre of Malta to Rabat, Mdina, Mtarfa and Dingli.
- St. Rita's Street (Triq Santa Rita) – the main road in front of Rabat Parish Church. The road leading from Rabat centre to Mdina, Mtarfa and the centre of Malta.

== San Ġiljan ==
- Birkirkara Road (Triq Birkirkara) – the road leading from Balluta Bay and Sliema (Mrabat area) to San Ġwann.
- Church Street (Triq il-Knisja) – the road leading from Paceville centre to Portomaso and San Ġiljan.
- Dragonara Road (Triq id-Dragunara) – the road leading from St. George's Bay to Paceville centre, Portomaso and San Ġiljan.
- George Borg Olivier Street (Triq Ġorġ Borġ Olivier) – the road leading from Balluta Bay to Spinola and San Ġiljan centre.
- Gort Street (Triq Gort) – the road leading from Paceville centre to St. Andrew's Road. This serve also as Paceville main bus terminus.
- Main Street (Triq il-Kbira) – the road leading from Sliema to Balluta Bay.
- Michelangelo Borg Street (Triq Mikielanġ Borġ) – the road leading from San Ġiljan centre to Regional Road, San Ġwann and Ta' Giorni.
- Ross Street (Triq Ross) – the road leading from Portomaso to Spinola Bay.
- St. George's Beach (Ix-Xatt ta' San Ġorġ) – the road leading from Pembroke, Malta to Paceville and San Ġiljan.
- St. George's Road (Triq San Ġorġ) – the road leading from San Ġiljan centre, Spinola Bay, to Paceville.
- St. Augustine Street (Triq Santu Wistin) – the road leading from Swieqi to Paceville and St. George's Bay.

== San Ġwann ==
- Bellavista Road (Triq Bellavista) – the road leading from Kappara and Regional Road to Mater Dei Hospital, Ta' Zwejt, San Ġwann Industrial Estate and Tal-Balal Road.
- Kappara Hill (Triq Tas-Sliema) – This road is also known as Sliema Road. The road leading from Gżira to Kappara and San Ġwann centre.
- Mensija Road (Triq il-Mensija) – the road leading from San Ġwann centre to Mensija, Ta' Giorni and Swieqi.
- Naxxar Road (Triq in-Naxxar) – the road leading from San Ġiljan, Balluta Bay and Sliema (Mrabat area) to San Ġwann.
- Rihan Avenue (Vjal ir-Riħan) – the road leading from Kappara and Mensija to Ta' Zwejt, Gharghur, Naxxar and Iklin.

== San Pawl il-Baħar ==
- Burmarrad Road (Triq Burmarrad) – the road leading from Mosta and Bidnija to Burmarrad, St. Paul's Bay area and the northern part of Malta.
- Għajn Tuffieħa Road (Triq Għajn Tuffieħa) – the road leading from St. Paul's Bay, Xemxija and Bugibba to Għajn Tuffieħa, Mġarr and Manikata.
- Islets Promenade (Dawret il-Gżejjer) – the road leading from St. Paul's Bay and Bugibba Promenade to Bay Square, Perched Beach, Ta' Fra Ben Bay and Qawra.
- Kennedy Drive – The road leading from Baħar ic-Cagħaq, Salini and Naxxar to Qawra, Bugibba, St. Paul's Bay, Xemxija and Burmarrad.
- Mosta Road (Triq il-Mosta) – the road leading from Bugibba and Burmarrad to St. Paul's Bay centre.
- Parades Street (Triq Parades) – This road along with St. Paul's Street forms the main road of St. Paul's Bay centre.
- Pioneers' Corp Street (Triq il-Korp tal-Pijunieri) – the main road that connects Bugibba and Qawra, one of the busiest tourist resorts in Malta.
- Pwales Beach (Xatt il-Pwales) – the road leading from St. Paul's Bay centre to Xemxija.
- Qawra Promenade (Dawret il-Qawra) – This is the main road of Qawra, one the busiest area in this tourist resort. This road connects Qawra with San Pawl il-Baħar, Burmarrad, Mosta, Naxxar and Salini Bay.
- St. Paul's Street (Triq San Pawl) – This is the main roads of St. Paul's Bay centre. This road connects Bugibba and Qawra with St. Paul's Bay and Xemxija.
- St. Paul's Bay Bypass (Dawret San Pawl) – the road leading from Burmarrad, Mosta and Bugibba to Xemxija, Għajn Tuffieħa and Mellieħa area.
- Trunciera Road (Triq it-Trunċiera) – the road leading from Bugibba, Bugibba Terminus, to Ta' Fra Ben Bay and Qawra Promenade.
- Waves Street (Triq il-Ħalel) – the road leading from Bugibba Promenade and Qawra to Bugibba centre.
- Wileg Street (Triq il-Wileġ) – the road leading from Qawra Promenade to Bugibba centre and St. Paul's Bay.
- Xemxija Hill (Telgħet ix-Xemxija) – This is the main promenade of Xemxija hamlet. This road connects St. Paul's Bay area with Mellieħa. All the traffic to catch the Gozo Ferry has to pass from this road.

== Santa Luċija ==
- Luqa Road (Triq Ħal Luqa) – the road leading Paola, Malta with Luqa and Malta International Airport.
- Dawret it-Torri (Tower By-Pass)
- Triq Katarina Vitale (Catherine Vitale Street)
- Triq Marija DeDominicis (Maria De Dominicas Street)
- Triq il-Begonja (Begonia Street)
- Triq il-Pepprin (Poppies Street)
- Triq il-Prinjoli (Aleppo Pine Street)
- Triq Tal-Barrani (Tal-Barrani Road)
- Vjal l-Oleandri (Oleandri Avenue)

== Santa Venera ==
- Canon Road (Triq il-Kanun) – the road leading from Birkirkara and Fleur-de-Lys to Qormi and Mrieħel Bypass.
- Old Railway Track (Triq il-Ferrovija l-Qadima) – the road leading from Ħamrun (Immaculate Conception Parish) and Regional Road to Birkirkara Valley.
- Regional Road (Triq Reġjonali) – the road that connects the south of Malta with the centre and north of Malta. The road leading from Marsa, Malta to Msida, Birkirkara, Ħamrun, Santa Venera, Mater Dei Hospital, University of Malta, Gżira and Sliema areas.
- St. Joseph High Street (Triq il-Kbira San Ġużepp) – the road leading from Ħamrun to Birkirkara, Fleur-de-Lys, Mrieħel, Attard and Balzan.

== Siġġiewi ==
- Blat il-Qamar Street (Triq Blat il-Qamar) – the road leading from Siġġiewi to Dingli, Buskett, Rabat, Malta and Mdina.
- Dr. Nicholas Zammit Street (Triq it-Tabib Nikol Zammit) – The road leading from Siġġiewi Bypass to Girgenti.
- Lapsi Street (Triq Lapsi) – The road leading from Siġġiewi centre to Ghar Lapsi, Ħaġar Qim and Tal-Providenza areas.
- Mgr. Michael Azzopardi Street (Triq Mons. Mikiel Azzopardi) – This road known also as Siġġiewi Bypass. The road that connects Siġġiewi with Żebbuġ, Malta, Qormi and the centre of Malta.
- Mqabba Road (Triq l-Imqabba) – The road leading from Siġġiewi to Mqabba, Hal Farrug, Luqa and the Malta International Airport.
- Qrendi Road (Triq il-Qrendi) – This road forms part of the Siġġiewi Bypass, Mgr. Michael Azzopardi Street, that connects Siġġiewi with Żebbuġ, Malta and the centre of Malta.
- Ta' Kilpa Road (Triq Ta' Kilpa) – the road leading from Siġġiewi centre to Qrendi.

== Sliema ==
- Manuel Dimech Street (Triq Manwel Dimech) – the road leading from Sliema Ferries to Mrabat and Balluta Bay.
- Qui-Si-Sana Strnd (Ix-Xatt ta' Qui-Si-Sana) – the road leading from Tower Road to Tigné Point.
- The Strand (Ix-Xatt) – this road also known as Sliema Ferries. The road leading from Gżira, Msida and Ta' Xbiex to Sliema commercial area.
- Tigné Strand (Ix-Xatt ta' Tigné) – the road leading from Sliema Ferries to Tigné Point.
- Tower Road (Triq it-Torri) – the main road of Sliema. This road stretch from through the Sliema promenade, that connects Gżira and Sliema (Ferries area and Tigné Point) with San Ġiljan, Balluta Bay and Paceville.

== Swieqi ==
- St. Andrew's Road (Triq Sant' Andrija) – the road leading from San Ġwann, San Ġiljan and Sliema area, and Regional Road to Madliena, Baħar ic-Cagħaq, San Pawl il-Baħar and the northern part of Malta.

== Ta' Xbiex ==
- Abate Rigord Street (Triq l-Abate Rigord) – the road leading from Gżira and Sliema to Ta' Xbiex centre and Msida.
- Ta' Xbiex Strand (Ix-Xatt ta' Ta' Xbiex) – the promenade leading from Sliema and Gżira to Msida.
- Testaferrata Street (Triq Testaferrata) – the road leading from Msida to Sliema area.

== Tarxien ==
- St. Leonard Street (Triq San Anard) – This road known also as Bulebel Road. This road connects Bulebel area with Fgura, Żejtun, Għaxaq, Gudja, Santa Luċija, and Tal-Barrani Road.

== Valletta (Capital City) ==
- Great Sirge Road (Triq l-Assedju l-Kbir) – The main road that connect Floriana, Malta with Valletta. This road is near the largest square in Malta, Fosos Square.
- Marsamxett Road (Triq Marsamxett) – This road form part of the Valletta Ring Road, that connects Floriana, Malta, Belt-is-Sebh area, with Fort St. Elmo and Marsamxett Harbour.
- Mediterranean Street (Triq il-Mediterran) – This road with Quarry Wharf form part of the Valletta Ring Road, the Valletta Harbor side.
- Quarry Wharf (Xatt il-Barriera) – This wharf form part of the Valletta Ring Road. This road connects Valletta Waterfront with Fort St. Elmo.
- St. Elmo Place (Pjazza Sant' Iermu) – The busiest area at the tip of Valletta, near Fort St. Elmo.

== Żabbar ==
- Convent Street (Triq il-Kunvent) – the road leading from Żabbar outskirts to Żabbar centre.
- Hompesch Gate Street (Triq il-Mina ta' Hompesch) – the road leading from Żabbar to Fgura.
- Labour Road (Triq Tal-Labour) – the road leading from Żabbar to Birgu, Bormla and Kalkara.
- Marsaskala Bypass (Triq Villabate) – the main road leading from Żabbar to Marsaskala.
- Marsaskala Road (Triq Wied il-Għajn) – the old road leading from Żabbar to Marsaskala.
- Sanctuary Street (Triq is-Santwarju) – the main road of Żabbar.
- St. Leonard's Street (Triq San Leonardu) – the main road of St. Peter's hamlet, leading from Xgħajra to Kalkara.
- Xgħajra Road (Triq ix-Xgħajra) – the road leading from Żabbar centre to Xgħajra.

== Żebbuġ, Malta ==
- Attard Road (Triq Ħ'Attard) – the road leading from Żebbuġ to Attard, Balzan and the centre part of Malta.
- Freedom Avenue (Vjal il-Ħelsien) – the main road of Żebbuġ. This road leads from Żebbuġ outskirt to Żebbuġ centre.
- Mdina Road (Triq l-Imdina) – the road leading from Qormi, Luqa and the southern part of Malta to Mdina, Rabat, Malta, Ta' Qali, Mosta and the centre part of Malta.
- Siġġiewi Road (Triq is-Siġġiewi) – the road leading from Qormi and Żebbuġ, Malta to Siġġiewi, Ghar Lapsi and Żurrieq area.

== Żejtun ==
- Cospicua Road (Triq Bormla) – This road also known as Tac-Cawsli Road. Leading from Żejtun to Fgura, Żabbar and Cottonera.
- President Anton Buttigieg Street (Triq il-President Anton Buttigieg) – the main bypass of Żejtun, leads to Marsaskala, Għaxaq, Bir id-Deheb and Tal-Barrani road.
- St. Thomas Bay Road (Triq id-Daħla ta' San Tumas) – This road leading from Żejtun to Marsaskala and St. Thomas Bay.
- Tal-Barrani Road (Triq Tal-Barrani) – the main road that leads from the south of Malta to the centre of Malta. This road principally leads from Żejtun to Tarxien, Għaxaq, Gudja, Santa Luċija, Paola, Malta, Marsaxlokk and Birżebbuġa.
- Xrobb l-Ghagin Road (Triq Xrobb l-Għaġin) – This road leading from Żejtun to Marsaxlokk and Delimara.

== Żurrieq ==
- Blue Grotto Avenue (Vjal il-Blu Grotto) – the main road of Żurrieq, leading from Żurrieq and Safi, Malta to Wied iz-Żurrieq and Blue Grotto.
- Valletta Road (Triq Valletta) – the road leading from Żurrieq to Kirkop, Mqabba and the Malta International Airport.
- Wied iz-Żurrieq Road (Triq Wied iż-Żurrieq) – the main road that leads to Wied iz-Żurrieq, Blue Grotto, Ħaġar Qim, and Ghar Lapsi area.

== Gozo ==
=== Fontana, Gozo ===
- Fontana Road (Triq l-Għajn) – the road leading from Victoria, Malta to Fontana, Malta centre, Munxar and Xlendi.

=== Għajnsielem ===
- Borg Għarib Road (Triq Borġ Għarib) – the road leading from Għajnsielem outskirts to Qala.
- Mġarr Road (Triq l-Imġarr) – the road leading from Mġarr (Gozo) and Għajnsielem to Victoria, Malta, Xewkija and the western part of Gozo.
- St. Anthony's Street (Triq Sant' Antnin) – the road leading from Mġarr (Gozo) and Għajnsielem to Nadur and Qala.

=== Għarb ===
- Church Street (Triq il-Knisja) – the road leading from Għarb outskirts, Frances Portelli Street, to Għarb centre.
- Frances Portelli Street (Triq Franġisk Portelli) – the road leading from Ta' Pinu area to San Lawrenz.
- Għarb Road (Triq l-Għarb) – the road leading from Victoria, Malta and Għasri outskirts to Għarb, Ta' Pinu and San Lawrenz.
- Our Lady of Virtues Street (Triq il-Madonna tal-Virtut) – the road leading from Għarb centre to Birbuba hamlet.
- Santu Pietru Road (Triq Santu Pietru) – the road leading from Birbuba hamlet to Santu Pietru hamlet.
- Ta' Pinu Road (Triq Ta' Pinu) – the road leading from Għarb outskirts to Ta' Pinu, Għasri and Ghammar hamlet.

=== Għasri ===
- Ghammar Road (Triq Ta' Għammar) – the road leading from Ta' Pinu and Ghammar hamlet to Għasri centre.
- Lantern Street (Triq il-Fanal) – the road leading from Ta' Gurdan lighthouse and Tal-Fanal Village complex to Għasri centre.
- Savior Gambin Street (Triq Salvu Gambin) – the main road of Għasri centre.
- Żebbuġ Road (Triq iż-Żebbuġ) – the road leading from Għasri to Żebbuġ, Gozo and Sara Valley.

=== Kerċem ===
- Advocate Calleja Street (Triq l-Avukat Calleja) – the main street to Kerċem centre.
- Santa Katarina tal-Qabbieza Street (Triq Santa Katarina tal-Qabbieża) – the road leading from Kerċem and Santa Luċija to Għarb.
- St. Paul's Estate Street (Triq Qasam San Pawl) – the road leading from Kerċem centre to Santa Luċija hamlet.
- Ta' Xuxa Road (Triq Ta' Xuxa) – the road leading from Kerċem centre to Victoria, Malta and Fontana, Gozo.

=== Munxar ===
- Kalkara tal-Gir Street (Triq il-Kalkara tal-Ġir) – the road leading from Munxar to Sannat and Ta' Cenc Cliffs.
- Qsajjem Road (Triq il-Qsajjem) – the road connecting Munxar with Xlendi.
- Ras il-Bajjada Street (Triq Ras il-Bajjada) – the road leading from Munxar centre to Xlendi.
- St. Simon Street (Triq San Xmun) – the road leading from Kantra Valley to Xlendi centre.
- Victoria Road (Triq ir-Rabat) – the road leading from Xlendi to Fontana, Malta and Victoria, Malta.

=== Nadur ===
- Għajn Qasab Road (Triq Għajn Qasab) – the road leading from Nadur and Ta' Bingemma area to Ramla Bay and Xagħra.
- Ħanaq Road (Triq Ta' Ħanaq) – the main road of Ta' Hida area.
- Mġarr Road (Triq l-Imġarr) – the road leading from Nadur to Għajnsielem and Mġarr (Gozo).
- Qala Road (Triq il-Qala) – the road leading from Nadur to Qala.
- Racecourse Street (Triq it-Tiġrija) – the main road of Nadur centre.
- Ramla Bay Road (Triq ir-Ramla) – the road leading from Nadur centre to Ta' Bingemma area and Ramla Bay.
- Victoria Road (Triq ir-Rabat) – the road leading from Nadur to Victoria, Malta, Ta' Xhajma Racecourse and Xewkija.
- Xandriku Street (Triq Xandriku) – the road leading from Nadur centre to the road leading to Mġarr (Gozo) and Għajnsielem.

=== Qala ===
- Ħondoq Bay Road (Triq Ħondoq ir-Rummien) – the road leading from Qala to Ħondoq ir-Rummien Bay.
- Immaculate Conception Street (Triq il-Kunċizzjoni) – the main road of Qala centre.
- Mġarr Road (Triq l-Imġarr) – the road leading from Qala to Mġarr (Gozo) and Għajnsielem.

=== San Lawrenz ===
- Frances Portelli Street (Triq Franġisk Portelli) – the road leading from Għarb and Victoria, Malta to San Lawrenz centre.
- Fungus Rock Road (Triq il-Ġebla tal-Ġeneral) – the road leading from San Lawrenz centre to Dwejra and the Azure Window area.
- Għajn Abdul Road (Triq Għajn Abdul) – the road leading from San Lawrenz to St. Ralph's Pond, Kerċem.
- Rokon Street (Triq ir-Rokon) – the road next to San Lawrenz main tourist resort complex.
- Wileġ Road (Triq il-Wileġ) – the road leading from San Lawrenz centre to Santu Pietru hamlet, Għarb.

=== Sannat ===
- Kalkar tal-Gir Street (Triq il-Kalkara tal-Ġir) – the road leading from Sannat centre to Munxar.
- Ta' Cenc Road (Triq Ta' Ċenċ) – the road leading from Sannat to Victoria, Malta and Ta' Cenc Cliffs.

=== Victoria, Gozo (Gozo's capital) ===
- Archbishop Peter Pace Street (Triq l-Arċisqof Pietru Pace) – the road leading from Victoria center to Gozo General Hospital.
- Capuchin Street (Triq il-Kapuċċini) – the road leading from Victoria to Marsalforn.
- City Gate Street (Triq Putirjal) – the road leading from St. Frances Square area to Gozo Main Bus Terminus and shopping centers area.
- Dawwara Road (Triq id-Dawwara) – the road leading from Victoria to Fontana, Malta and Xlendi.
- Dr. Anton Tabone Street (Triq it-Tabib Anton Tabone) – the road leading from Victoria to Sannat and Munxar.
- Enrico Mizzi Street (Triq Neriku Mizzi) – the road leading from Victoria centre to Tac-Cawla area.
- Foreman Street (Triq l-Imgħallem) – the road leading from Victoria to Żebbuġ, Gozo.
- Fortunato Mizzi Street (Triq Fortunato Mizzi) – the road leading from Victoria centre to Xewkija, Xagħra, Ta' Xhajma Racecourse, Nadur and Qala.
- Gedrin Street (Triq Gedrin) – the road leading from Victoria to Kerċem and Lunzjata Valley.
- Mġarr Road (Triq l-Imġarr) – the road leading from Victoria to Xewkija, Gozo Stadium, Għajnsielem and Mġarr (Gozo).
- Pope John Paul II Street (Triq il-Papa Ġwanni Pawlu II) – the road leading from Victoria centre to Għarb, Għasri, San Lawrenz, Ta' Pinu and Dwejra.
- Republic Street (Triq ir-Repubblika) – the main street that connects Victoria with The Citadel.
- St. Frances Square (Pjazza San Franġisk) – the busiest area of Gozo.
- St. Ursula Street (Triq Sant' Orsla) – the road leading from The Citadel to Savina area and the roads leading to the Western part of Gozo.
- Vajringa Street (Triq Vajringa) – the road connecting Tomba area with St. Francis Square area.

=== Xagħra ===
- 8th September Avenue (Vjal it-8 ta' Settembru) – the road leading from Xagħra centre to Ggantija.
- Clay Street (Triq it-Tafla) – the main street near Ggantija temples.
- Għajn Hosna Road (Triq Għajn Ħosna) – the road leading from Xagħra to Ramla Bay and Nadur.
- Gnien Xibla Road (Triq Ġnien Xibla) – the main street of Xagħra centre.
- Marsalforn Road (Triq Marsalforn) – the road leading from Xagħra to Marsalforn.
- Ta' Hamet Road (Triq Ta' Ħamet) – the road leading from Xewkija, Victoria, Malta and Ta' Xhajma Racecourse to Xagħra.

=== Xewkija ===
- Mġarr Road (Triq l-Imġarr) – the road leading from Victoria, Malta to Xewkija, Għajnsielem and Mġarr (Gozo).
- Qala Road (Triq il-Qala) – the road leading from Xewkija to Qala.
- St. Leonard's Street (Triq San Anard) – the road leading from Xewkija and Victoria, Malta to Ta' Xhajma Racecourse, Nadur and Xagħra.

=== Żebbuġ, Gozo ===
- Church Street (Triq il-Knisja) – the road leading from Żebbuġ outskirts, Żebbuġ Cemetery area, to Żebbuġ centre.
- Għajn Mhelhel Road (Triq Għajn Mħelħel) – the road leading from Żebbuġ centre to Xwejni, Qbajjar and Marsalforn.
- Victoria Road (Triq ir-Rabat) – the road leading from Marsalforn to Victoria, Malta.
- St. Mary Street (Triq Santa Marija) – the road leading from Qbajjar to Marsalforn.
- Xagħra Road – the road leading from Marsalforn to Xagħra.
