= Tal-Barrani =

Area in Malta

Coordinates: 35.859521°N 14.517302°E

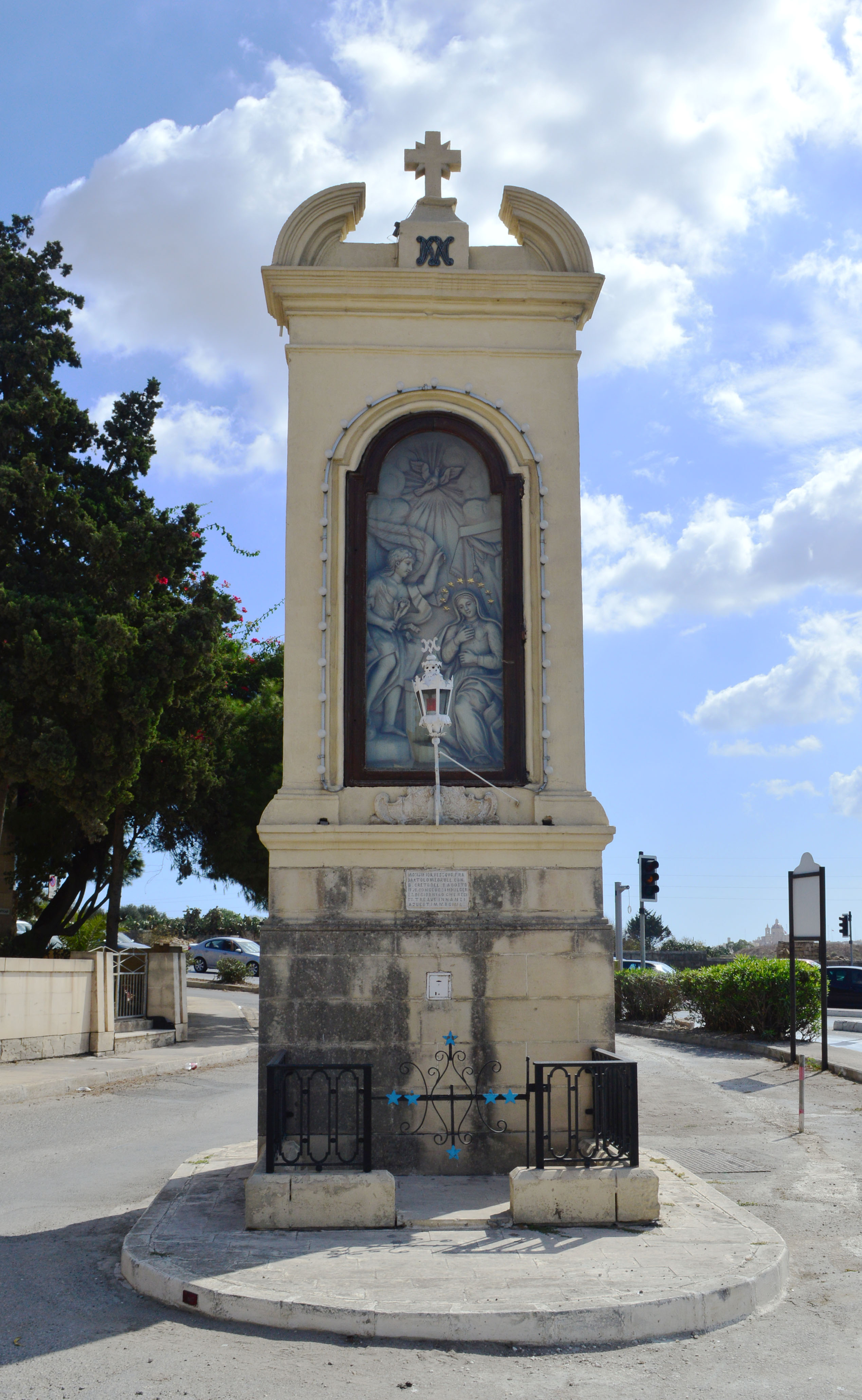
A niche of the Annunciation of Our Lady lies on Tal-Barrani Road.

Tal-Barrani is a primarily agricultural area in Malta that extends from the town of Żejtun to the villages of Santa Luċija, Ħal Tarxien and Ħal Għaxaq, lying across many south-eastern communities in Malta. The land gives its name to a nearby chapel dedicated to Saint Lucy. In a notarial document dating from the 16th century, the area near this estate was known as bitalbarrani, that is, the stranger's or outsider's land. This name may indicate that the land under cultivation at Tal-Barrani belonged to some outsider, either someone from outside a village community, or a foreigner. Moreover, the same land contained another area which was called Tal-Misilmin (land of the Muslims).^{[A]} At least from the 17th century onwards, Tal-Barrani was a recognised agricultural estate, and was documented in the 1654 property book of the Order of St. John, the Cabreo Magisteriale.

In the 1960s, a depot for Malta's milk collection system was built at Tal-Barrani. In October 1965, while constructing the depot, a number of archaeological remains were found in the middle of the building site. The site was later demolished, and a private hospital was built, leading to the finding of further tombs in 2008 and 2009. A Late Roman and Byzantine catacomb and a tomb were discovered and excavated in 1993, closer to Żejtun.

Tal-Barrani is an important transportation link in the south-eastern part of the island, with a major road cutting the area in half. The existing road consists of a dual carriageway of two northbound and two southbound lanes separated by a central reserve. A€20 million road project is being proposed to divert traffic between Tal-Barrani Road and Vjal Santa Luċija via tunnels.

Tal-Barrani was the site of political violence on 30 November 1986, when a group of people, some wearing balaclavas, began hurling stones and bottles on an approaching group of political activists. The clashes erupted with the appearance of members of the police's Special Mobile Unit, who fired teargas canisters and rubber bullets onto the crowd, and mayhem ensued.

== Geography and geology ==
The promontory of Żejtun is defined to the north by Wied iz-Ziju, which separates Żejtun from Ħal Tarxien and other outlying high ground. This valley includes the area known as Tal-Barrani. The land also gives its name to a type of uniform clay brown soil. In a number of areas in Malta and Gozo, a type of calcareous colluvium lies above a layer of terra fusca.^{[B]} If the colluvium is thin, the mixing of the two layers due to tilling over a long period of time will produce a uniform brown soil, very rich in clay. This type was classified as Tal-Barrani.

== Archaeological remains ==
Tal-Barrani contains a significant number of archaeological remains. These include an ancient tomb cluster and field systems at the Tal-Ħotba site at Tal-Barrani, and a number of late Roman and Byzantine catacombs. A Christian catacomb and four rock-cut tombs were discovered in 1915, 1963 and 1993, under the present road footprint of Tal-Barrani. At least another seventeen tombs were discovered in 1965, 1966 and 2008 were found in fields in an area known as Tal-Ħotba, very close to Tal-Barrani road. The 1960s discoveries at Tal-Ħotba consisted of three tombs within the footprint of the old milk collection depot.

=== Ancient cluster of tombs and field systems ===
Three ancient Punic rock-cut tombs were uncovered and investigated by the Museums Department in 1965 and 1966 in the Tal-Ħotba area of Tal-Barrani. The tombs were uncovered during the construction of a milk depot on previously undeveloped agricultural land. In 2008, a development permit was issued for the demolition of this industrial building, to be replaced by a new private hospital. Construction works began under archaeological surveillance. By October 2008, rock-cut tombs discoveries were reported. Authorities started an extensive investigation of the land. By early 2009, fourteen rock-cut tombs were found and partially studied. Given the importance of this discovery, the authorities protected these remains, and began procedures for their scheduling. The developer proposed to redesign the development to guarantee the physical conservation of this important cluster of ancient tombs. The proposed hospital building was moved to a new site within the same property. A number of field trenches for agricultural purposes were also uncovered.

=== Late Roman and Byzantine catacombs ===
In May 1993, an important Late Roman to Byzantine burial site was uncovered during trenching works along Tal-Barrani road, on the approach to the higher ground before the 25 November Avenue crossroads leading to Żejtun. Two subterranean burial monuments were discovered within 10.0 metres from each other. These were a multi-chambered burial catacomb, and a Late Roman rock-cut chamber tomb. The catacomb was found on the Żejtun side of the hillock, at a higher point to the chamber tomb, which was found closer towards Ħal Tarxien.

The discovery was important in that it contained the burial strata in their intact state. These survived and were sealed within the catacomb. Additionally, the Tal-Barrani catacomb was the first one to be examined scientifically. The presence of a Christian catacomb so close to a rock-cut chamber tomb is a rare occurrence, which is usually found only in the Rabat area. Tal-Barrani provides evidence of continuity in usage of a much larger communal cemetery; this was initially made up of chamber tombs and a multi-chambered catacomb.

Discoveries in the same location are noted in Temi Żammit's archaeological notebooks, and in the Archaeological Museum's 1963 report. The burial ground was large, and it contained a mixture of tombs and other burial facilities.

One of the skeletons discovered in 1993 showed evidence of an ankylosing spondylitis, and Forestier's disease, which is a chronic form of arthritis involving the spinal area.

The Tal-Barrani road very likely formed part of older road networks, some of which date back to antiquity. The placing of burial tombs and catacombs by the side of main roads was not uncommon in the Maltese islands. The road was widened and realigned in modern times. As a result, some of the Tal-Barrani tombs were discovered, while others remained hidden under the old road surface. This may have preserved the catacomb. The rock-cut chamber tomb was cut into a natural terrace, which was later hidden by the modern Tal-Barrani road. Part of the tomb's shaft was hidden by the rubble wall of the previous and narrower Tal-Barrani road. This rubble wall is still preserved underneath the present central reserve.

When the tomb was discovered, the sealing slab was still lodged securely. The tomb's structure was largely intact, except for the back section which was cut through by the modern trenching works. Apart from debris from the trenching works, the tomb chamber and contents were intact and undisturbed. The chamber contained two main areas, a rectangular burial site with a water trench cutting its middle, and an arcosolium at the back. The front area measured about 2.5 metres in length, slightly longer than the arcosolium which measured 2.1 metres. The water trench in the front provided standing room, and separated the two burial platforms. The water trench was reached by three steps leading down from the entrance, while the arcosolium was a focus point. It betrayed an unusual tomb design, which suggested a Late Roman date for the burials. The burial platform of the arcosolium included two carved head-rests.

== Political violence ==
Tal-Barrani was the site of political violence on 30 November 1986, after the Nationalist Party decided to organise a political activity in Żejtun, a Labour Party stronghold. The Labour Party viewed this choice as a provocation, and the police withdrew a permit that had already been issued. The government, led by Karmenu Mifsud Bonnici, cited public order concerns. The Nationalist Party insisted it had a right to organise political activities anywhere in Malta to exercise its freedom of expression. The Party went to court and in a tense sitting had its claim confirmed. The Constitutional Court authorised the Nationalist Party to hold a meeting in Żejtun on 30 November 1986. The party's general secretary Louis Galea had alerted the police of rumours that the meeting would be obstructed by government supporters. The roads to Żejtun were blocked with stones and rubble during the night of 29 November, and the authorities did not take any action, even when this continued in their presence on 30 November. When the Nationalist Party supporters approached, a small group of men tried to hold them back but eventually retreated behind a truck. The fully equipped Special Mobile Unit police then moved in, followed by over a hundred people, some of them masked and armed. The mounted police brought up the rear, with the police spraying tear gas and firing rubber bullets on the Nationalist Party supporters. Many shots were fired and people were injured, some seriously. The meeting had to be abandoned and the Nationalist Party supporters retreated followed by the "mixed army" of policemen and government supporters. The latter left a lot of damage in their wake, although one could not exclude that some Nationalist Party supporters also caused some damage, particularly to the cars of the police stationed at Tal-Barrani. Sixteen years later, three men were conditionally discharged for their part on the day.

== Notes ==
[A]. Bital misilmin, pecia terrae in contrata bitalbarrani: 15.xii.1527, Not. Gr. Vassallo, NAV, R 464/3, f.70.
[B]. Colluvium is defined as 'a superficial deposit transported predominantly by gravity containing <50.0% of material of >60 mm in size.'
