= Kappara =

Coordinates: 35°52′N 14°34′E

Kappara, or Il-Kappara, is a hamlet in Malta, situated between the local councils of San Ġwann, St. Julian's and Gżira. Kappara is mainly part of San Ġwann.

== Buildings in Kappara ==
- Antonio Bosio Secondary School
- Chiswick House School
- Ta' Ċieda Tower
- Ta' Xindi Farmhouse
