= Chadwick Lake =

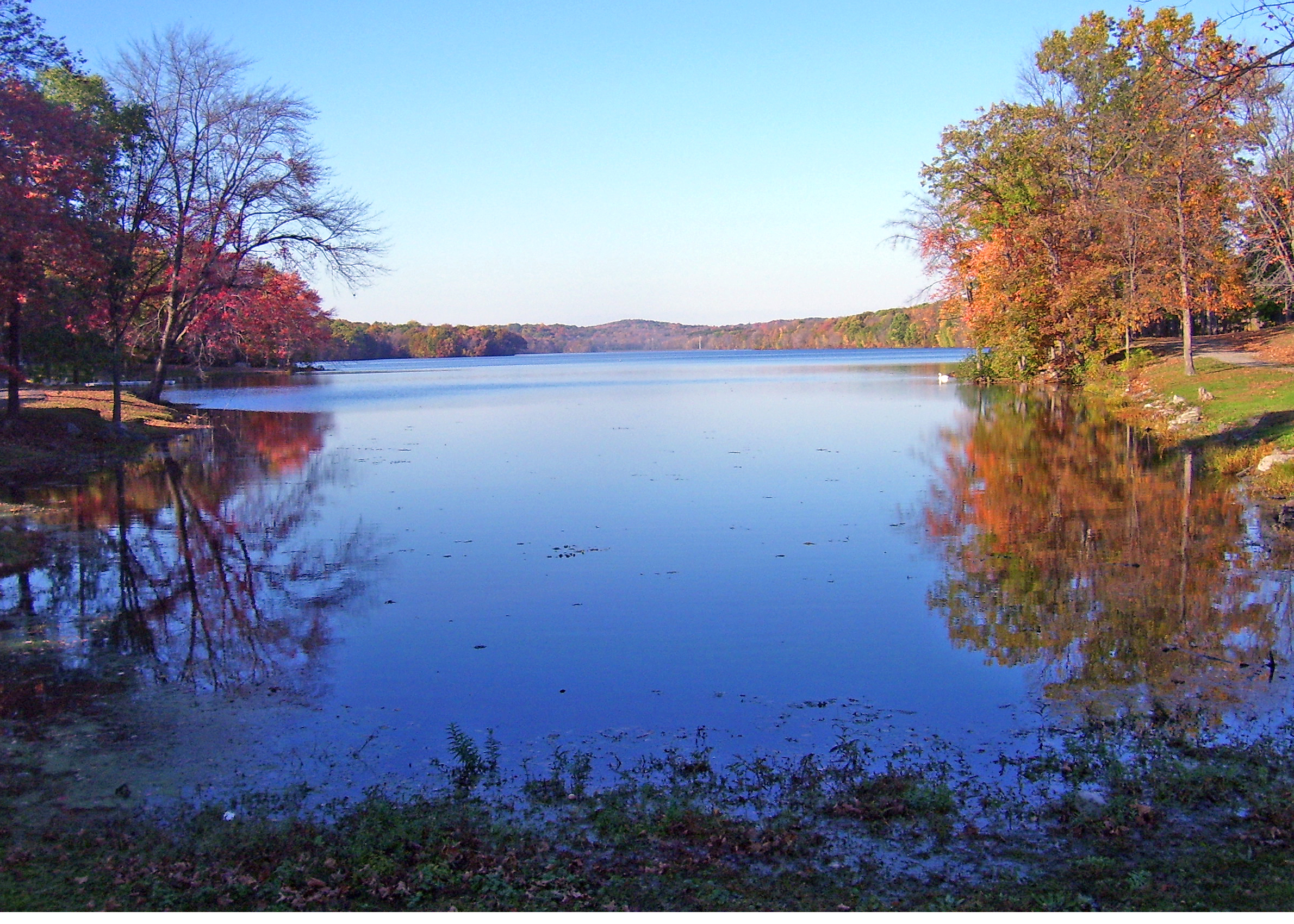
- Lake viewed from its southern tip

- Location within New York Location within the United States
- Location: Town of Newburgh, New York
- Coordinates: 41°33′54″N 74°04′08″W
- Type: Reservoir
- Primary inflows: Quassaick Creek
- Primary outflows: Quassaick Creek
- Catchment area: 13.25 sq mi (34.3 km^{2})
- Basin countries: United States
- Max. length: 2.3 mi (3.7 km)
- Max. width: 0.3 mi (480 m)
- Surface area: 207 acres (0.84 km^{2})
- Average depth: 9 ft (2.7 m)
- Max. depth: 25 ft (7.6 m)
- Water volume: 612,000,000 US gal (2,320,000 m^{3})
- Surface elevation: 453 ft (138 m)

Chadwick Lake is a reservoir supplying water to the Town of Newburgh, in Orange County, New York, United States, in which it is located. It is a manmade lake created in 1926 on private property owned by the Chadwick family by damming Quassaick Creek. It was maintained for recreational purposes for 36 years. In 1962, it was purchased by the Town of Newburgh as a reservoir to supply the Town with water. In more recent years, its use as a water supply has been supplanted by the Delaware Aqueduct and so Chadwick Lake has reverted to its original function of a recreational facility. It is located immediately to the northwest of the junction of NY 32 and 300 in the Cronomer Valley section of the town. It is open to the public, and there are recreational facilities near the southern end.

Most of the town's water is supplied today by New York City's Delaware Aqueduct, with the reservoir acting primarily as a backup. In the past, surplus water has been sold to private companies, and in 2006 to neighboring New Windsor during a water shortage there. At times, more often than not, the Town of Newburgh has relied exclusively on the Aqueduct since manganese levels in the lake give its waters a brownish tint. This is especially true since a new, state of the art water treatment plant at the Delaware Aqueduct went on line in early 2014.

Facilities near the lake's southern end, include picnic shelters, two playgrounds, fitness and walking trails and boating launches. A recent expansion is adding basketball courts, a skating rink and an arboretum. Use is generally limited to town residents. Fishing is also allowed on the lake; largemouth bass is a common catch. A very popular addition to the park is a 4.2 mile hiking trail, which encircles the entire lake.

== History ==
The dam creating Chadwick Lake was constructed by the Chadwick family in 1926 and the lake remained private property. The Bethlehem Rod and Gun Club purchased fishing rights and kept the lake stocked with fish. Admission was charged for the use of the lake, for fishing, swimming and boating, with the Chadwick family receiving 50% of the receipts, the Bethlehem Rod and Gun Club 25%, and the paid caretaker at the lake 25%.

Since at least the mid 1930s the Town discussed purchasing the lake as a water supply. However, action of this nature by a Town was prohibited by New York State law until 1961, when the State legislature approved new legislation authorizing such a purchase. The Chadwick family originally requested one million dollars for the purchase of the lake and surrounding area, but after negotiations with the Town lowered its request to $850,000. The Town counteroffered $775,000 for 427 acres (1.73 km^{2}) including the entire lake, and the Chadwick family accepted. An additional 18 acres (73,000 m^{2}) of adjacent land was offered by various property owners for $15,000, for a total price tag of $790,000. Town Councilman Robert DeLong, who spearheaded the movement to purchase the lake, pointed out that the tax base of the Town had increased by 1961 to finally allow such a purchase without forcing an undue burden on the Town taxpayers. He also contended that the water table in the Town had dropped to alarming levels in parts of the Town, making the purchase of the lake a priority.

Despite DeLong's arguments and despite a unanimous 5-0 vote in favor of the purchase by the Town Council, the purchase still proved to be controversial. Opponents of the purchase contended that the Town of Newburgh was still too rural to warrant a central water supply, and the $790,000 price tag was too steep. Opponents believed that by not providing municipal water, the rural nature of the Town of Newburgh could be retained indefinitely. Opponents of the purchase had obtained enough signatures to force a public referendum, and in the vote taken on February 26, 1962, the purchase was approved by a vote of only 987 to 881 with 32 void ballots.

The park facilities have expanded greatly. The improvements are paid for out of a Parkland Trust Fund, into which all developers in the Town are required to contribute. Accordingly, the Chadwick Park improvements and expansion have had very minimal impact upon the taxpayers.

Some old commercial maps from the 1950s and 1960s erroneously label the lake as "Cronomer Lake". This is probably due to the lake's proximity to the hamlet of Cronomer Valley. There is no evidence that the name Cronomer Lake was ever used, either officially or popularly, and so the citation can be considered a typographical error.
