= Għar Lapsi =

Small bay in Malta

Coordinates: 35.8272°N 14.4246°E

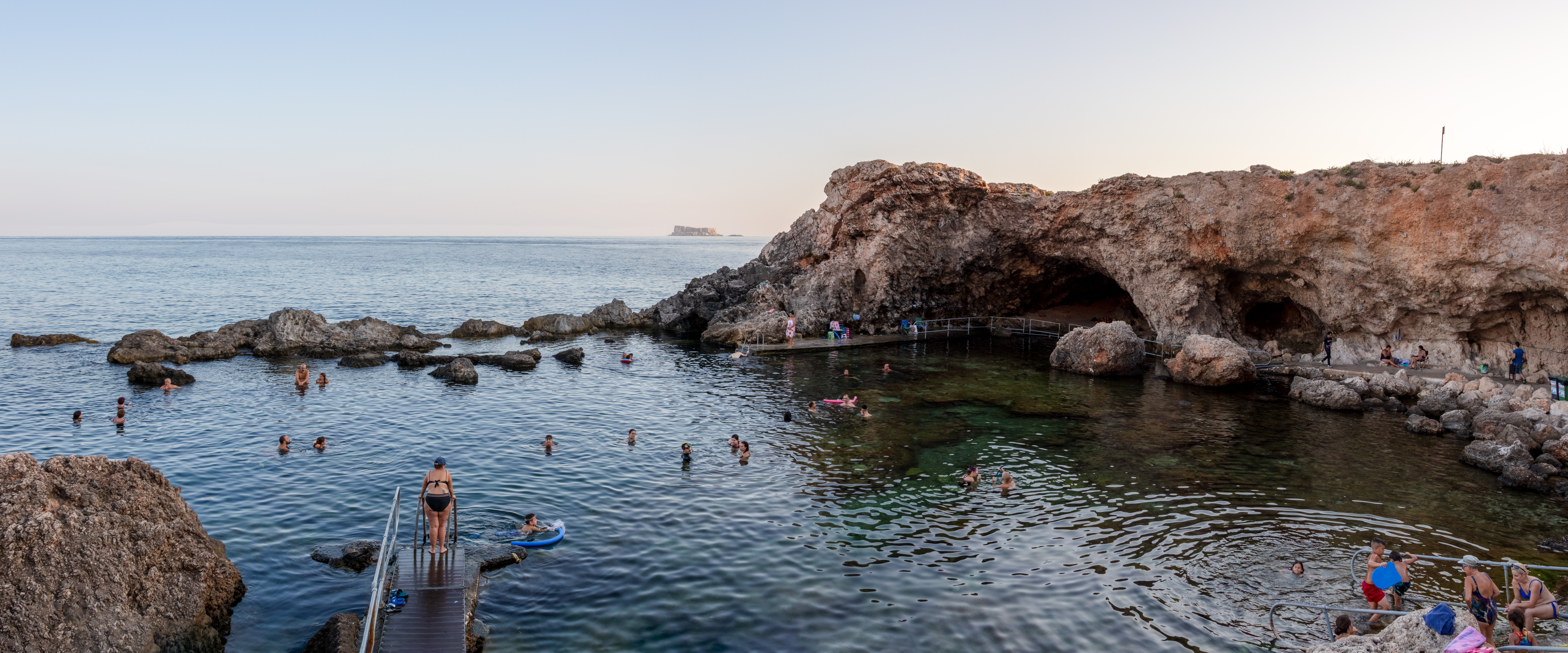
Għar Lapsi

Għar Lapsi is a small bay near Siġġiewi, Malta. It lies about 1 km (0.62 mi) south-west of the Blue Grotto.

Some structures in the bay were damaged by Storm Harry in January 2026.
