= St. Martin's College (Malta) =

School in Malta

Coordinates: 35°53′52″N 14°28′47″E

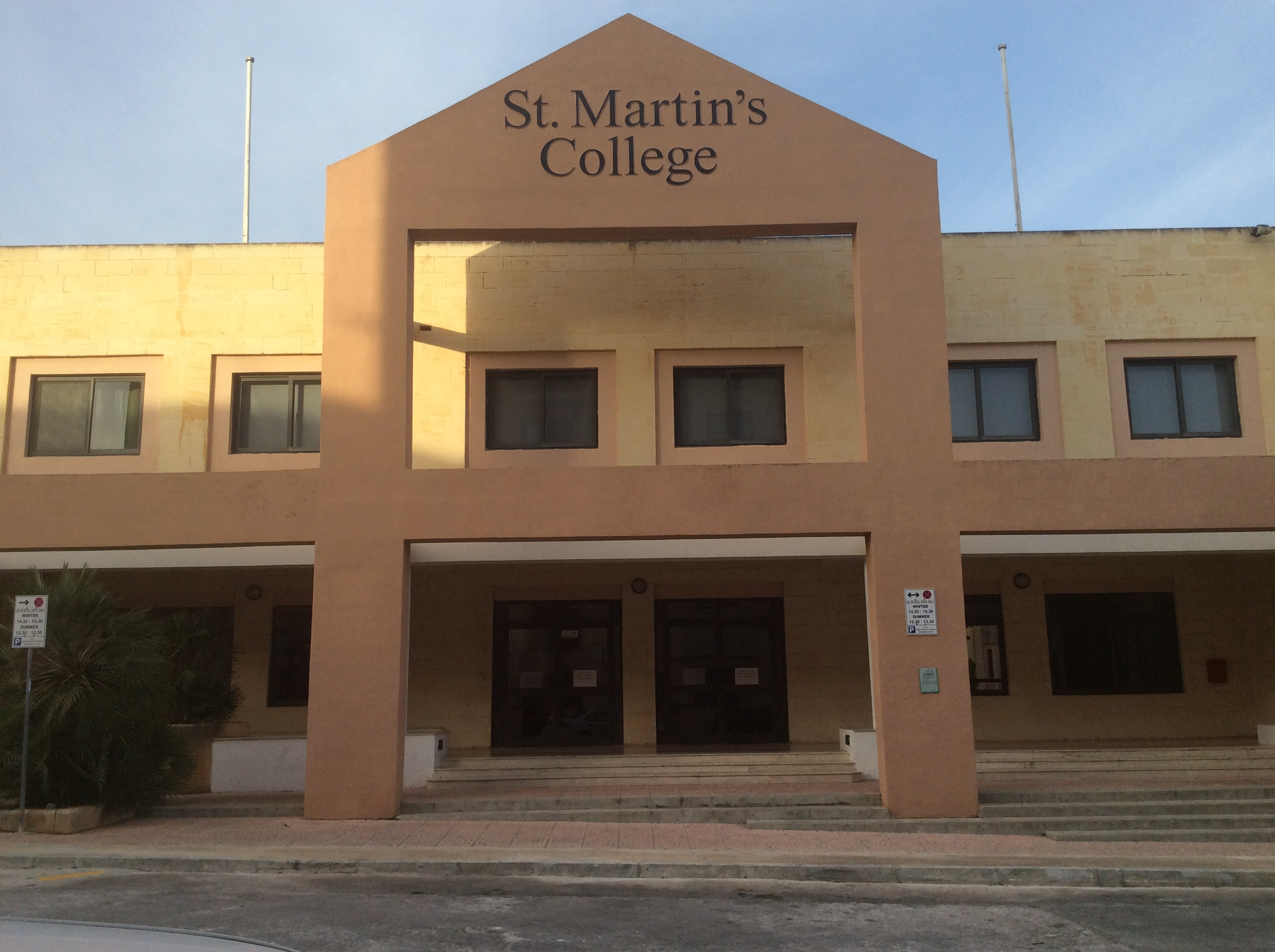
St. Martin's College

St Martin's College is located at Triq Is- Swatar, L-Imsida, Malta.

== History ==
St Martin's College forms part of a co-educational establishment in Malta catering for pupils aged 2 years and 1 month to 18 years. Founded in 1905, by Ethel Yabsley and Madeleine Sceberras, the school originally catered for the children of British families stationed in Malta. In time, the school established itself at Windsor Terrace, Sliema. In 1991, the school moved to its present premises in Swatar. Further expansion took place in 1993. St Martin's College Sixth Form was founded in 2007 and is directly attached to the main building. The school consists of a Middle School, Senior School and a Sixth Form. It is the secondary school of Chiswick House School, which is located in Kappara, San Ġwann, Malta. One of the teachers is Maltese singer Stefan Galea.

== See also ==
- Education in Malta
- List of schools in Malta
