= St Joseph's Church, Msida =

Parish Church of St Joseph
- Il-Knisja Parrokkjali ta' San Ġużepp
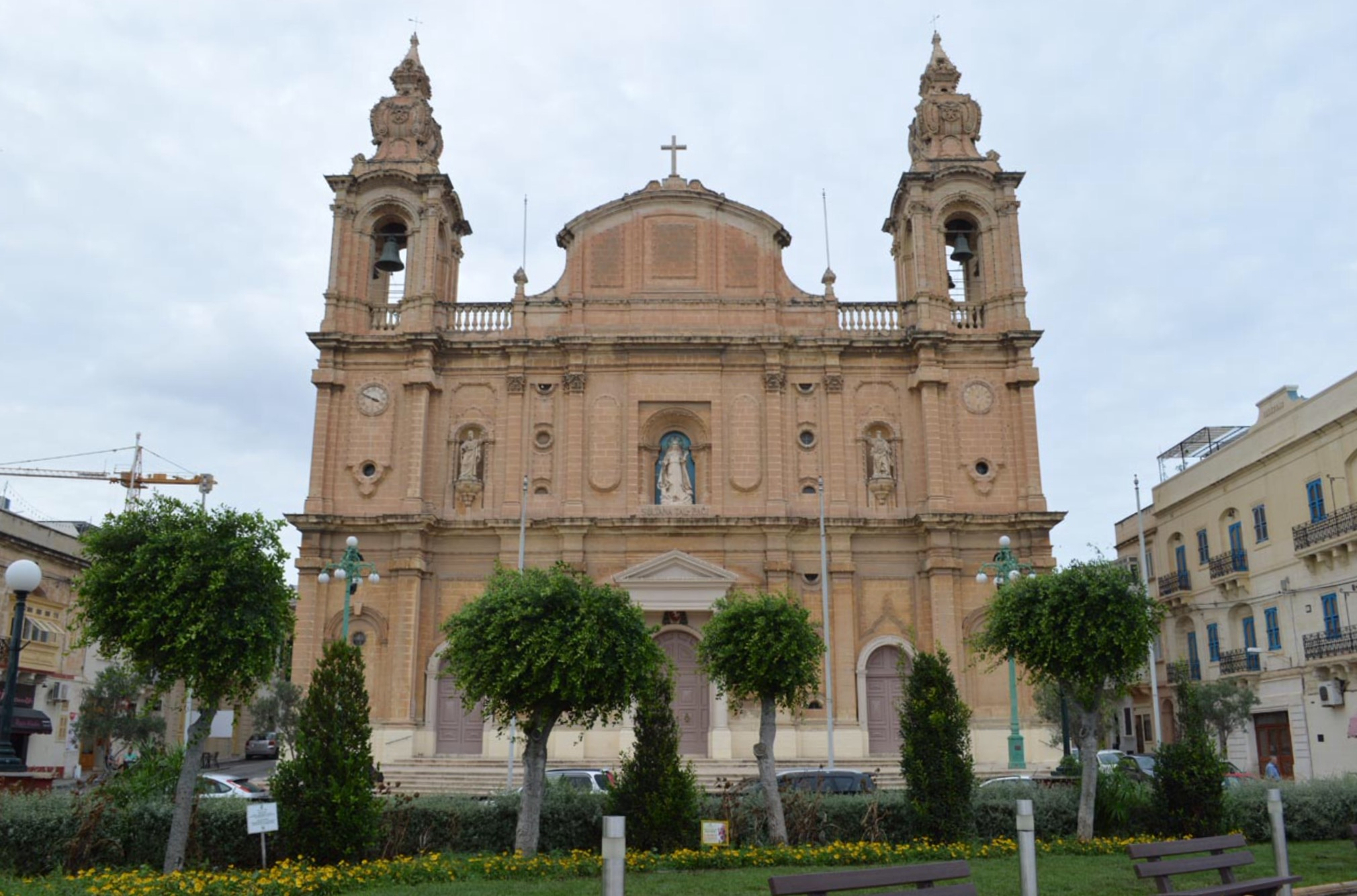
- Façade of St Joseph Church
- Parish Church of St Joseph
- 35°53′47.9″N 14°29′24.3″E
- Location: Msida, Malta
- Country: Malta
- Denomination: Roman Catholic

History
- Status: Active
- Dedication: Saint Joseph
- Consecrated: 22 April 1894

Architecture
- Functional status: Parish church
- Architectural type: Church
- Style: Baroque
- Completed: 1889

Specifications
- Materials: Limestone

Administration
- Archdiocese: Malta
- Parish: Msida

The Parish church of Saint Joseph is a Roman Catholic Baroque parish church located in Msida, Malta.

== History ==
The first parish of Msida was built in 1867 whilst under the religious guidance of Archbishop Gaetano Pace Forno. The chosen patron was the Immaculate Conception. A larger church dedicated to St Joseph was built later on. Works on this new building were finished by 1889. The church was consecrated on April 22, 1894.
