= Swatar =

Swatar Tas-Swatar/Is-Swatar
- Local councils of Birkirkara and Msida; Swatar Administrative Committee
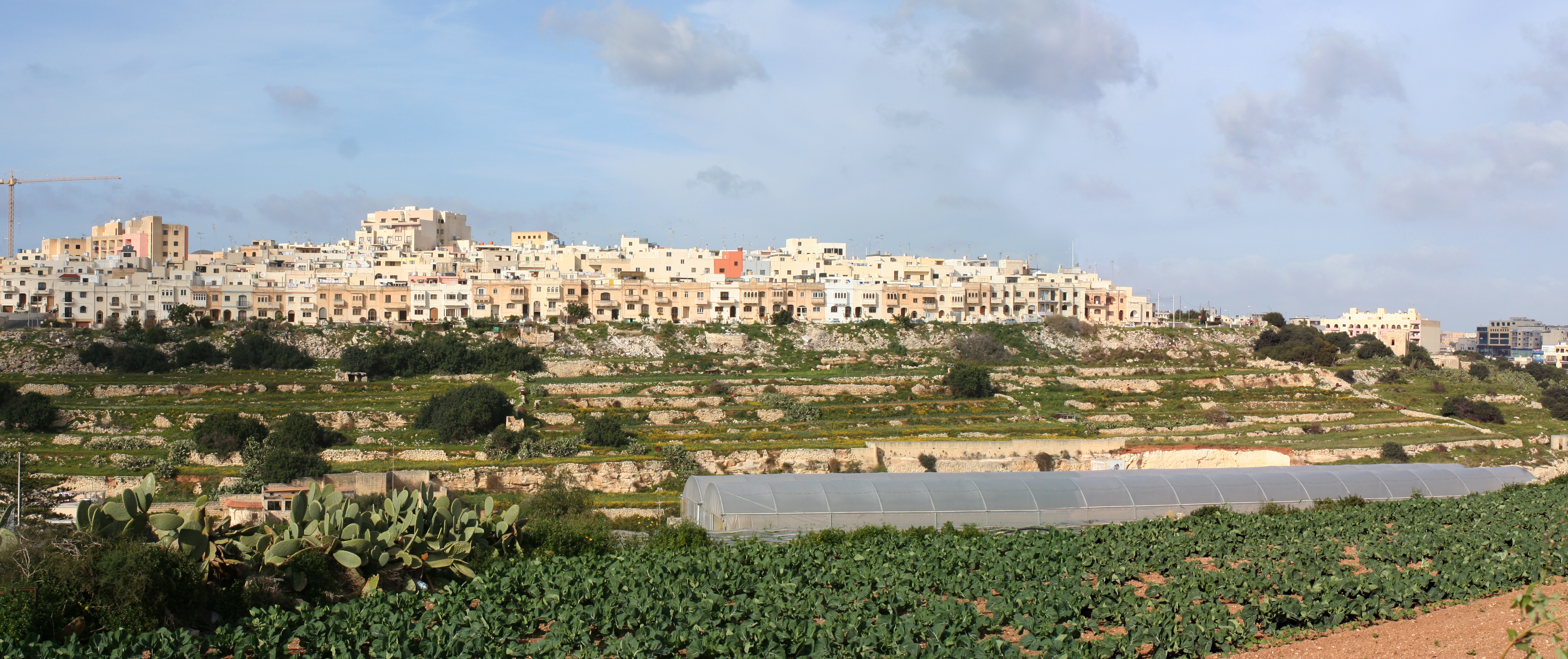
- View of the hamlet of Swatar
- Interactive map of Swatar
- Coordinates: 35°53′53″N 14°28′43″E
- Country: Malta
- District: Northern Harbour District
- Founded: 2006
- Borders: Tal-Qattus and Ta' Paris (Birkirkara), and Tal-Qroqq (Msida)

Population (2017)
  - Total: 5,100
- Time zone: UTC+1 (CET)
  - Summer (DST): UTC+2 (CEST)
- Postal code: BKR and MSD
- ISO 3166 code: MT
- Patron Saint: San Gorg Preca
- Day of Patron Saint feast: May 9th

Swatar, (Maltese: Tas-Swatar or Is-Swatar), is a hamlet in Malta situated in Birkirkara and in Msida. As of 2015, the population was approximately 5,100 people, with about 1,600 families. Swatar has its own separate parish since 8 November 2006, by an official decree issued by the Bishop of Malta Monsignor Paul Cremona.

Swatar is located on a hill. It is in the proximity to Mater Dei Hospital and the University of Malta which are found in an area in Msida known as Tal-Qroqq. Swatar is also found next to Tal-Qattus and Ta' Paris areas in Birkirkara. The hamlet has been consisting of mainly farmlands until most of the 20th century.

Some buildings, such as farmhouses, were built during the rule of the Order of St. John. Most of the buildings today were built sometimes after World War II and consist of modern neighborhoods. Some significant economic activity takes place on the side of Birkirkara Bypass.

== History ==
Swatar has been an agricultural land since the Arab period in Malta when it was not considered as a reference area on its own. During the Order of St. John the area remained largely uninhabited but the areas in the surroundings were both agricultural and hunting zones. The area started to be populated mostly after World War II when several families started to settle out of the cities. The Government of Malta has given financial advantages to acquire and build land in the 1970s and 1980s for families who moved to live there; with similar schemes around Malta.

Swatar has had its own spiritual service, by the Roman Catholic Church, since 1989, and became a separate parish in 2008. The current parish priest is Fr Robert Grech. The patron of the church is Saint George Preca, a Maltese.

The area has its own social gathering groups such as the Society of Christian Doctrine (M.U.S.E.U.M), the Żgħażagħ Azzjoni Kattolika (ŻAK) and a relative new pastoral center.

The pastoral center includes the parish church, a community gathering garden, a car park and a farmhouse. The farmhouse host three main community gathering being; the Adoration Chapel, the house of the parish priest and the gathering place of the ŻAK. The farmhouse is a vernacular building and is one of the oldest buildings in Swatar. It has gone under different adaptive reuse and structural changes. The carpark is not for general public use.

There is a public garden, named Swatar Garden, which is situated at Balliju Guttenberg Street. The garden is equipped with European standard facilities such as; a 5-a-side football ground, energy efficient lightning and safety and security measures.

Swatar hosts a relative large number of companies, banks and other investments, which are mainly situated overlooking the Mater Dei Hospital on Birkirkara Bypass. Banks include the headquarters of the APS Bank and the HSBC Bank Call Centre.

There was a Meditation Centre for some Asian communities in Malta until September 2014 but it was closed for not having legal permits by the Malta Environment and Planning Authority (MEPA). Swatar is a common housing rental area specifically for students attending the University of Malta, that are from Gozo or are on Erasmus Programme.

== Governance ==
Swatar remains an integral part under the Birkirkara and Msida Local Councils, however it has its own administration being the Swatar Administrative Committee. The Labour Party generally gains the popular vote.

== Gallery ==
Community buildings
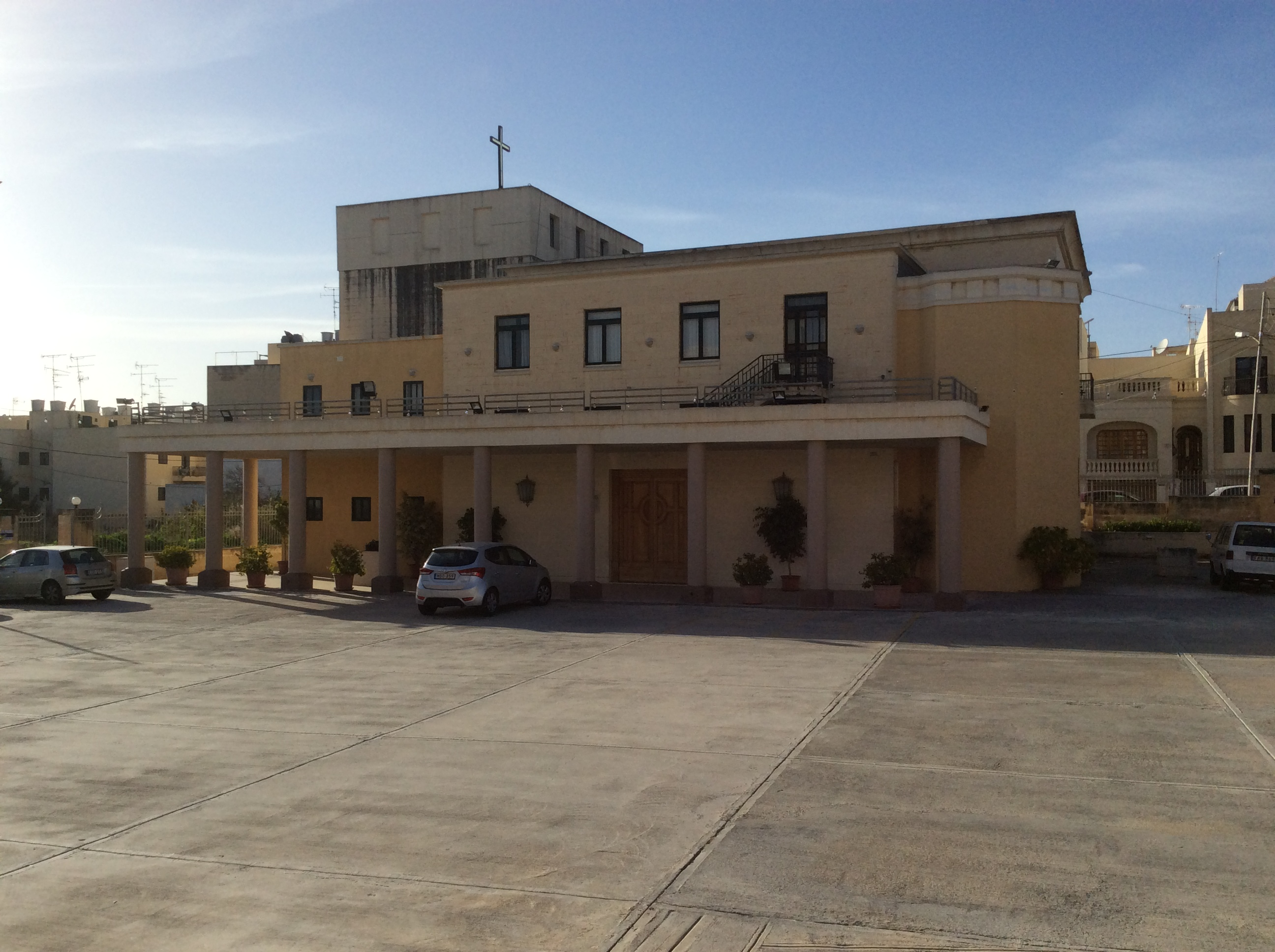
Parish Church of St Ġorġ Preca

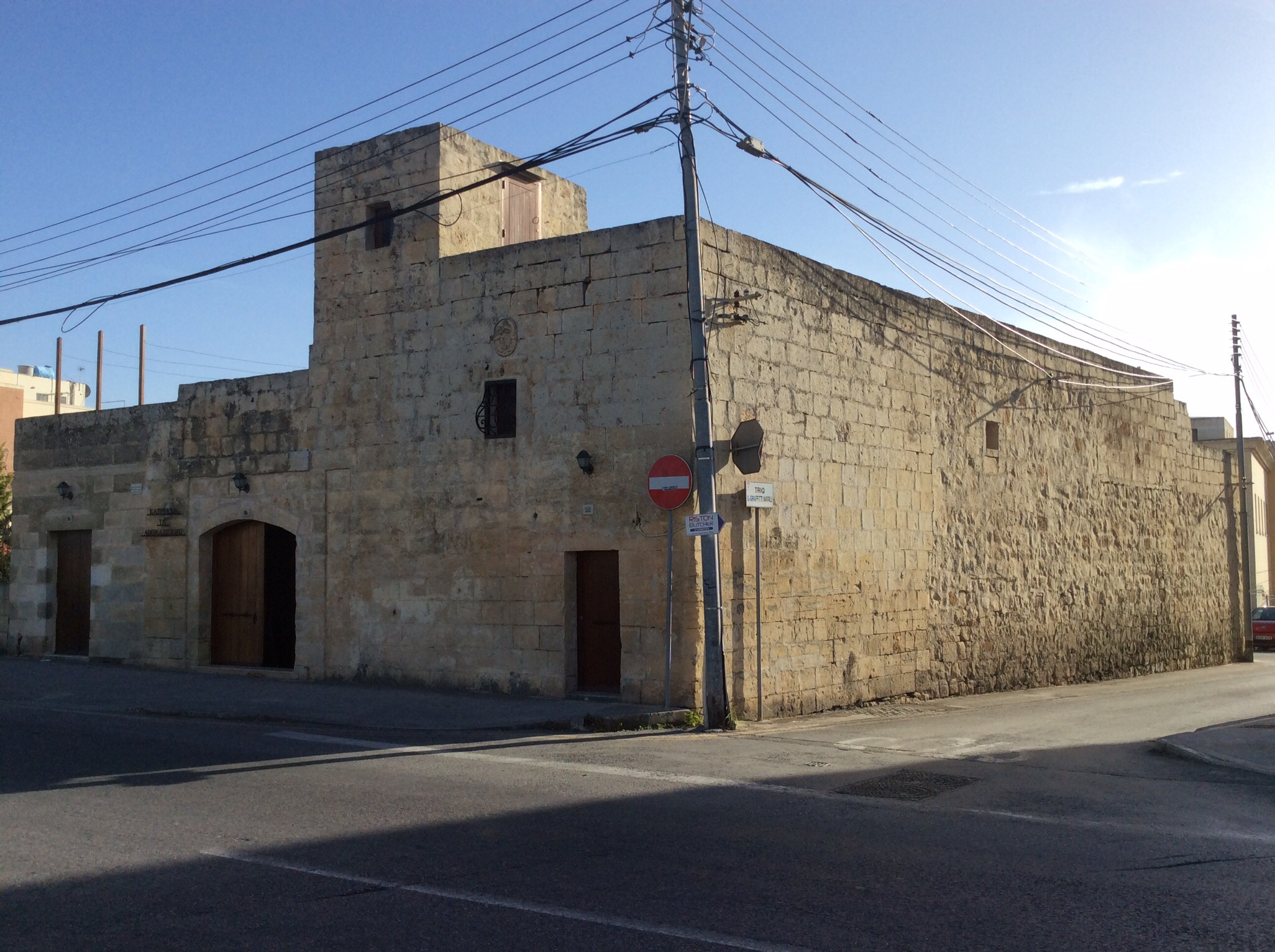
Pastoral Centre Farmhouse

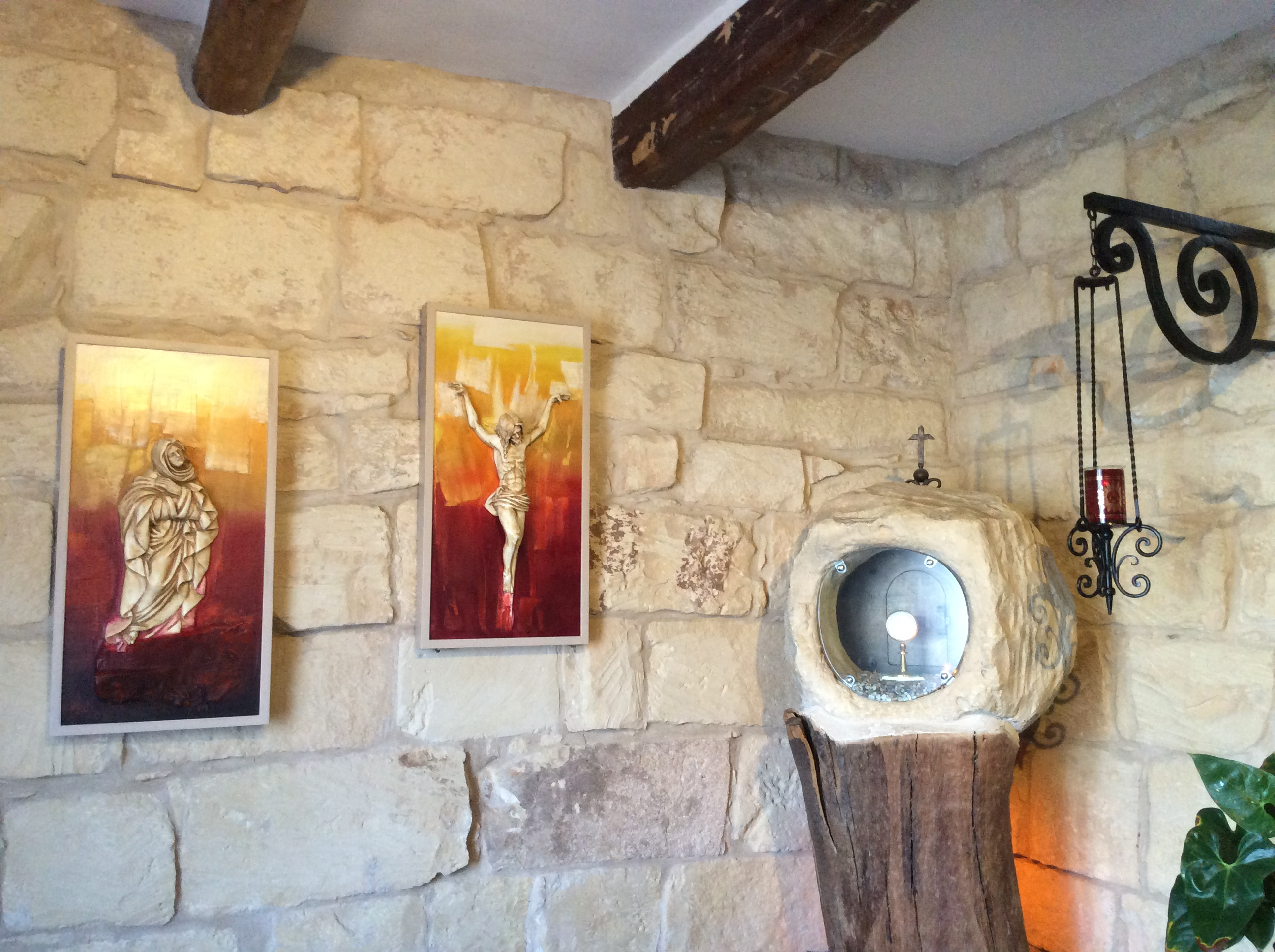
Interior of the Chapel of the Adoration (farmhouse)

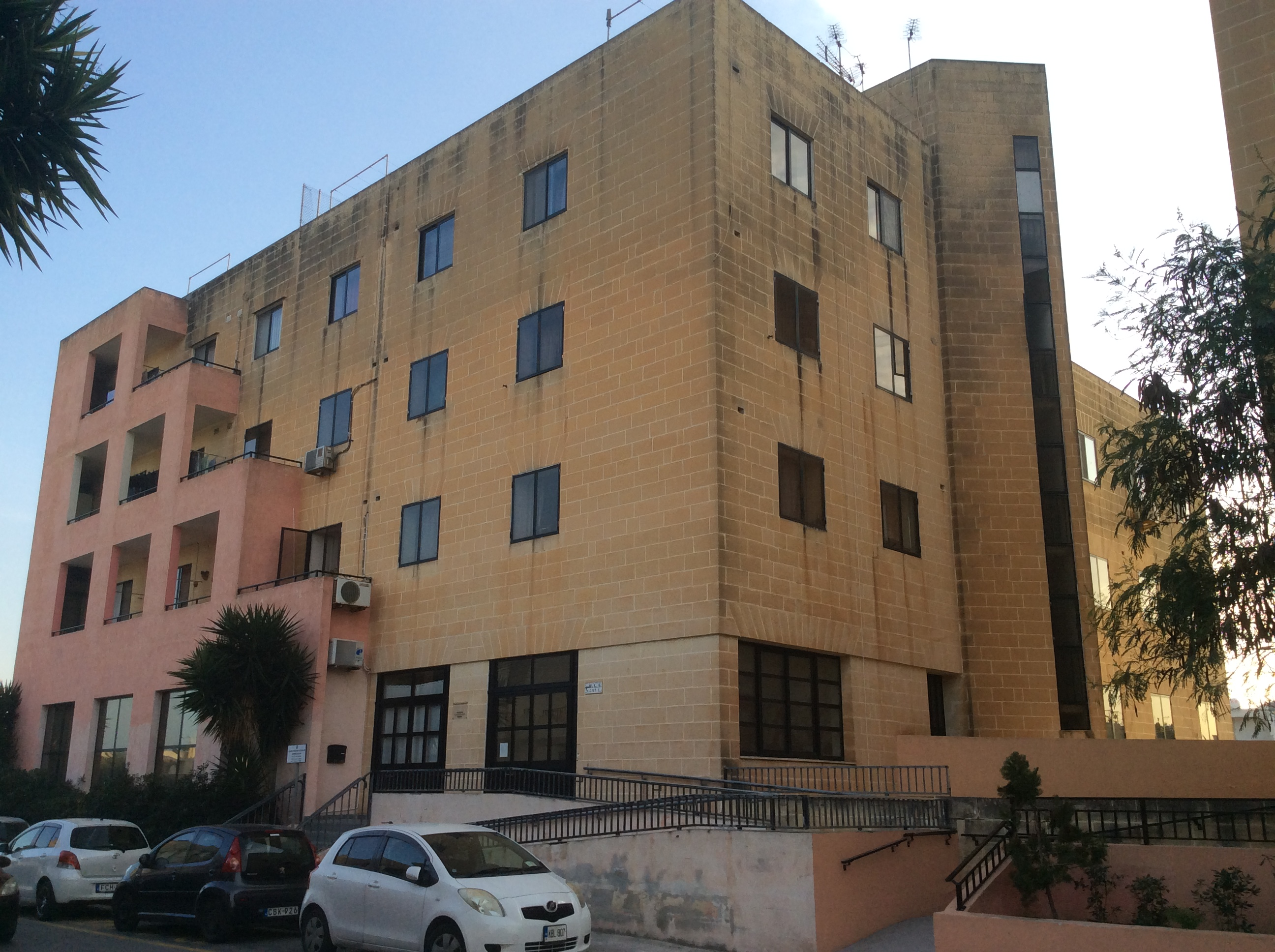
Swatar centre for people with disabilities

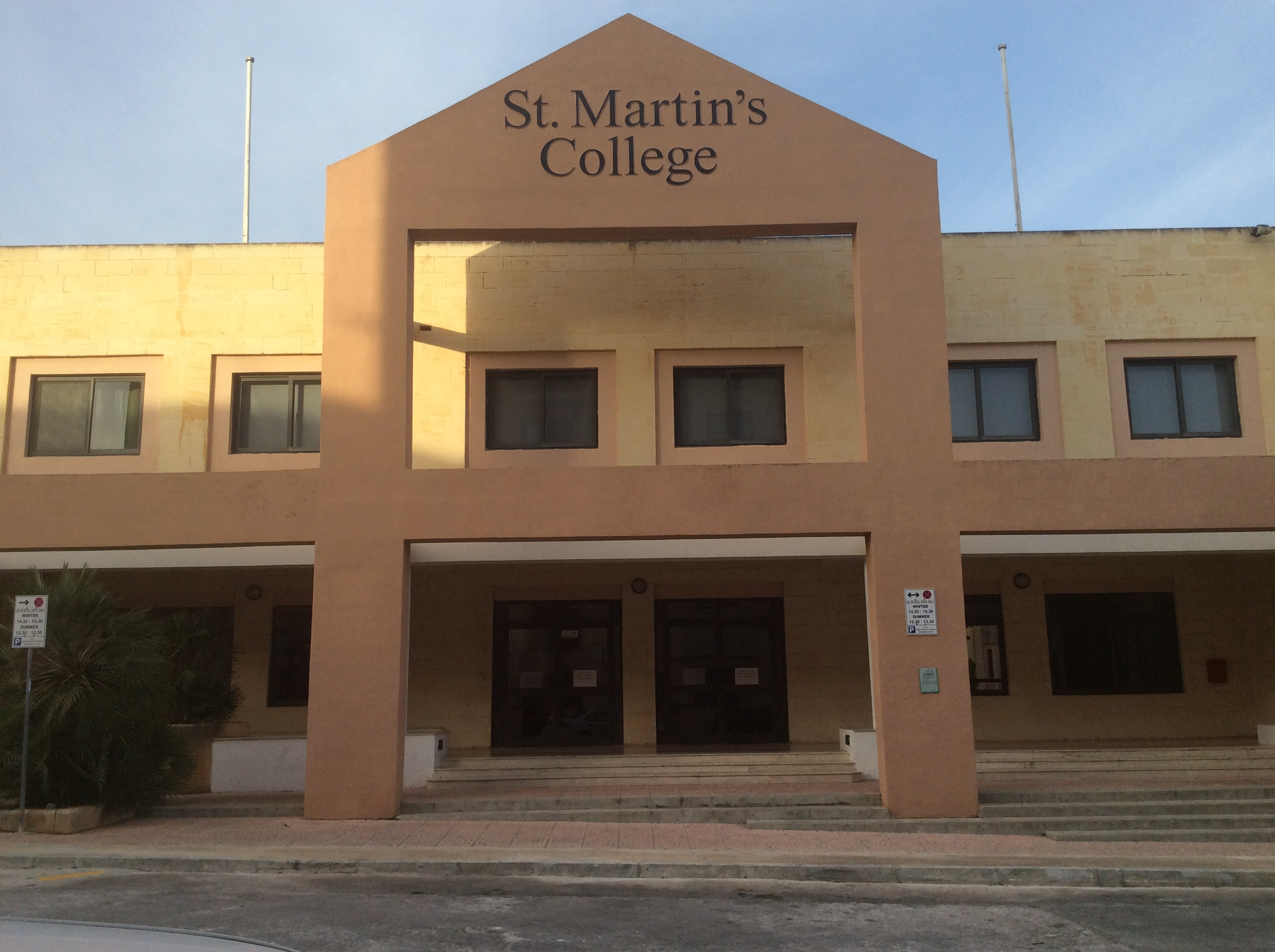
St Martin's College
Farmhouses and farmlands
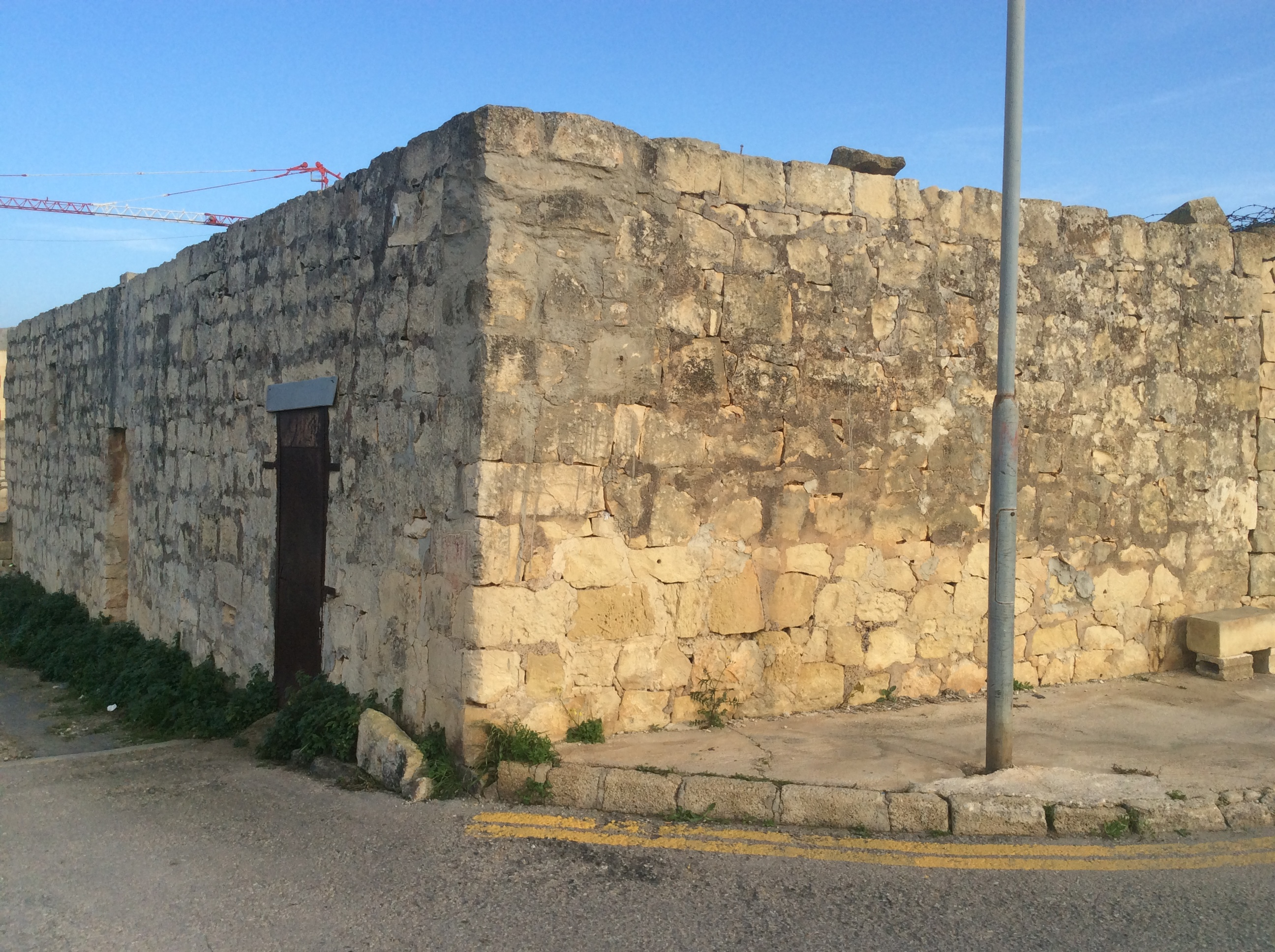
Farmhouse built in 1714

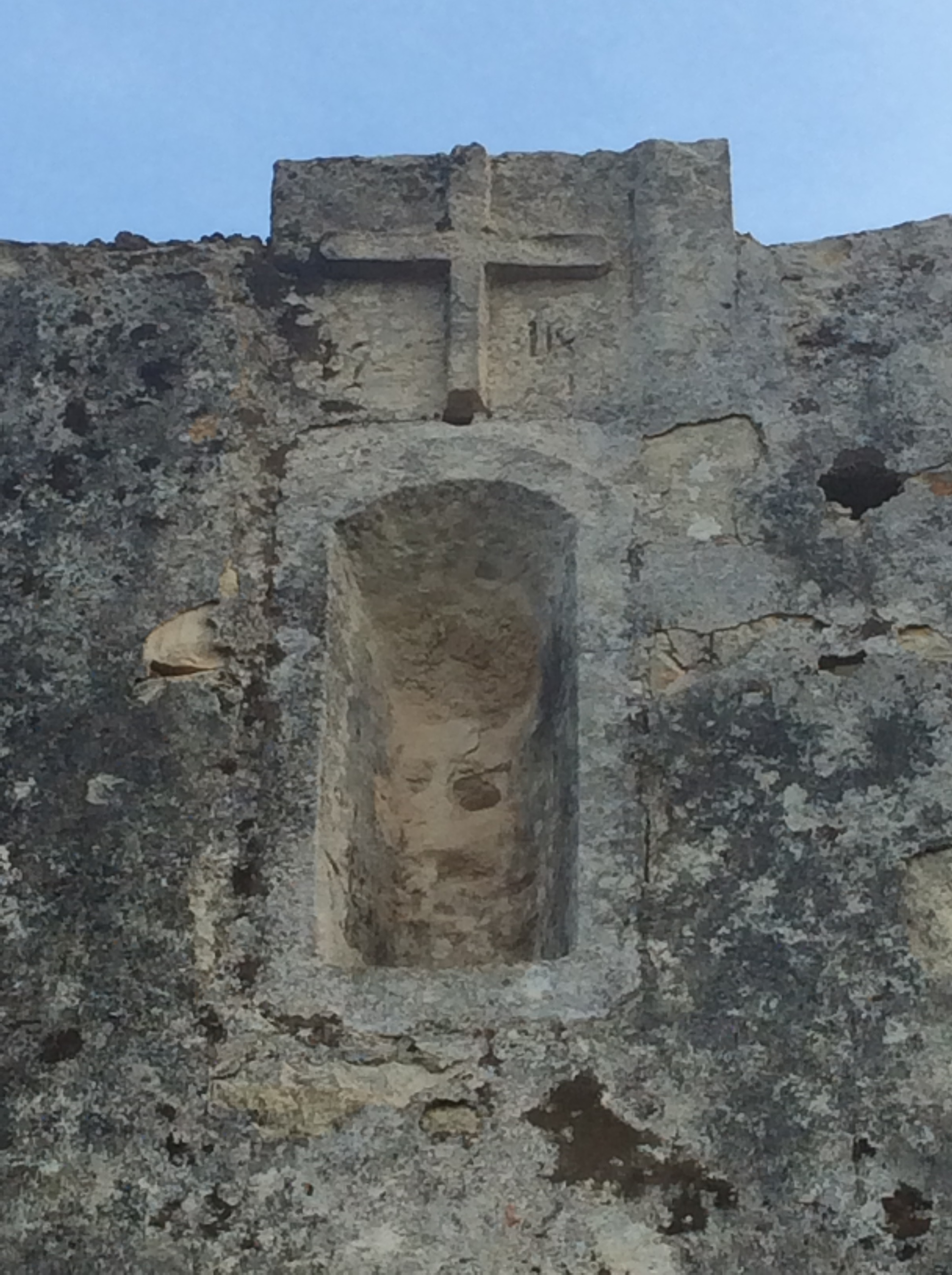
Niche with date reading 1714

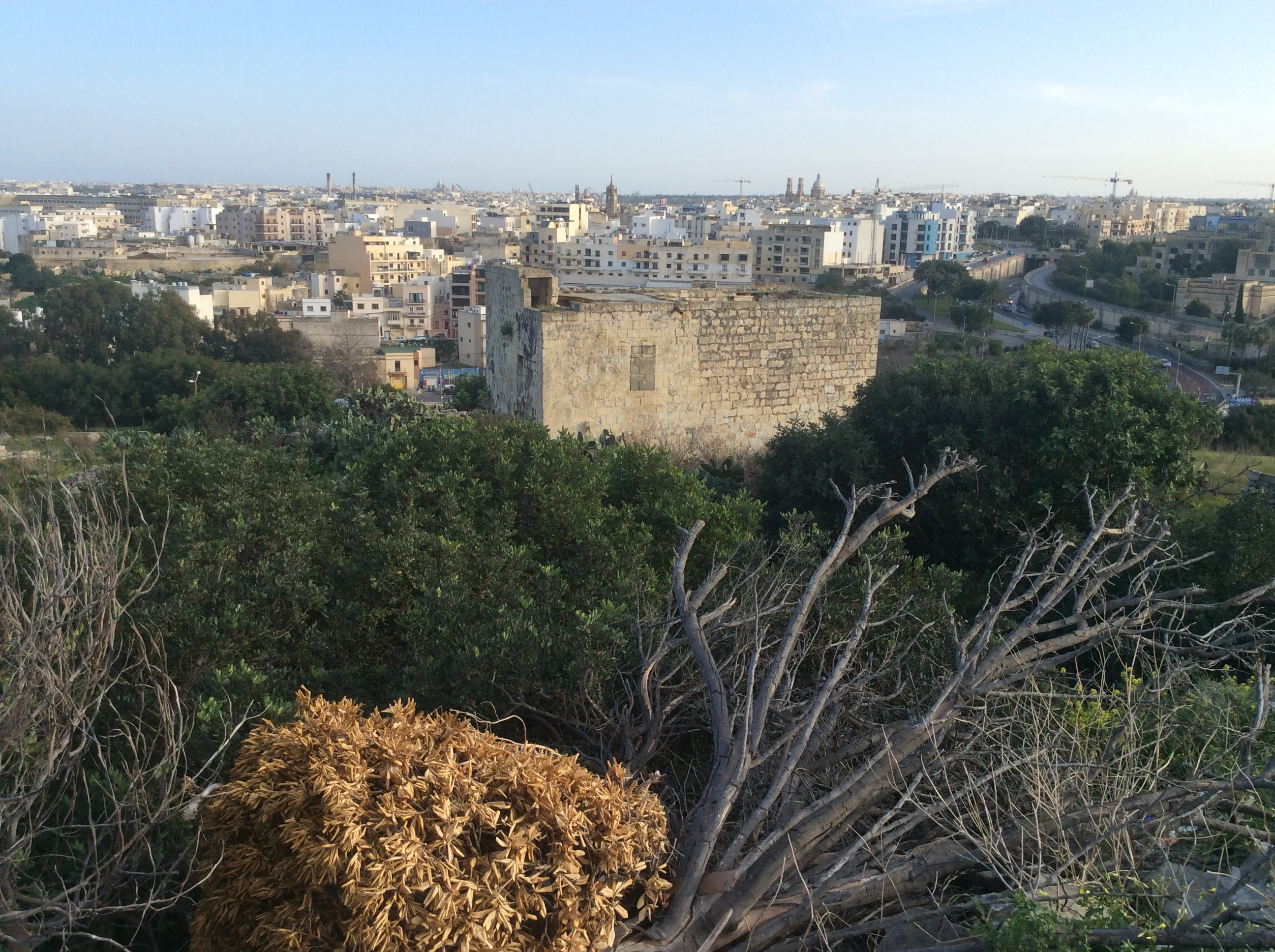
Farmhouse built during the rule of the Order of St. John

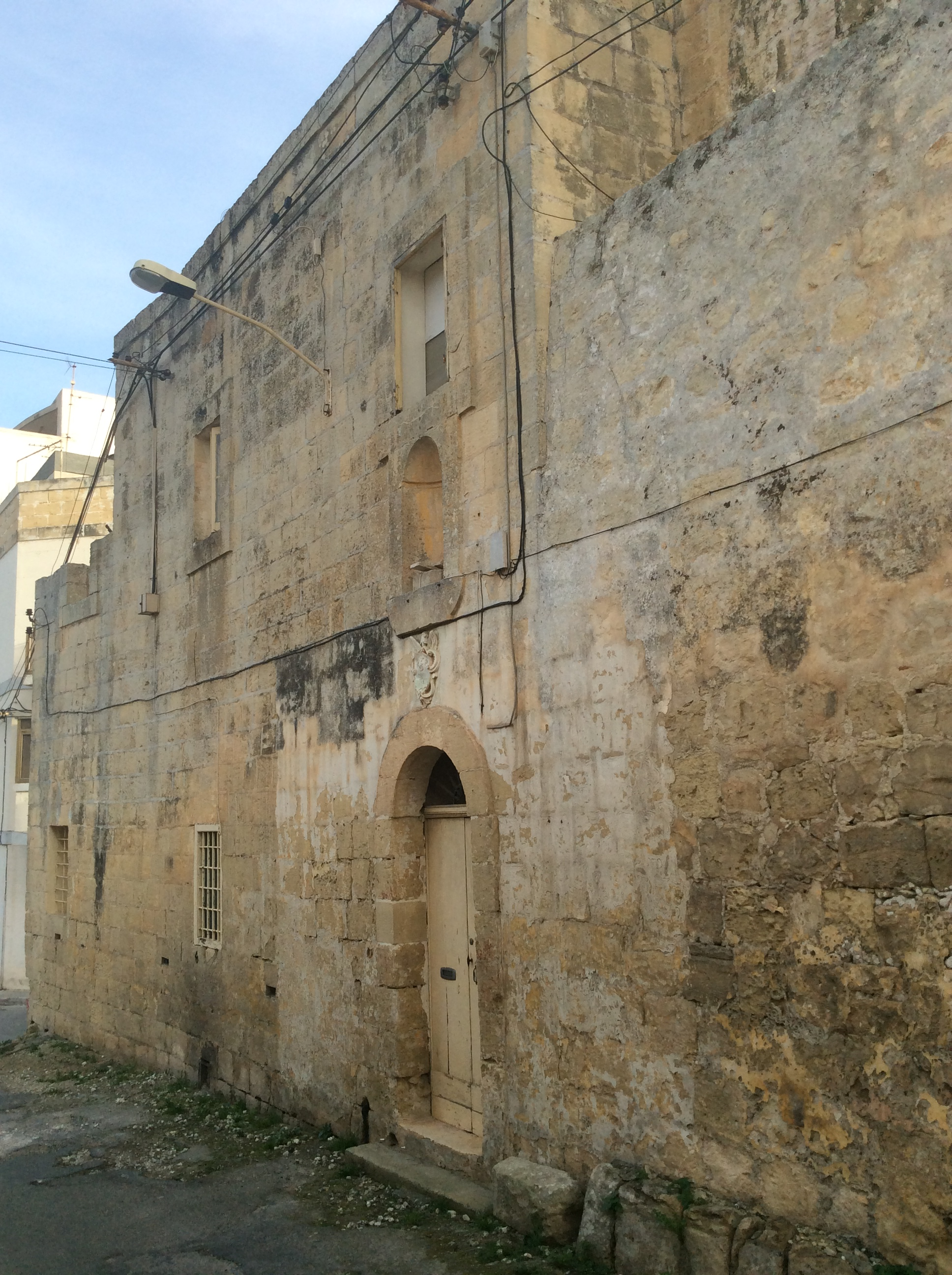
Farmhouse near the University of Malta
Agricultural lands and stables
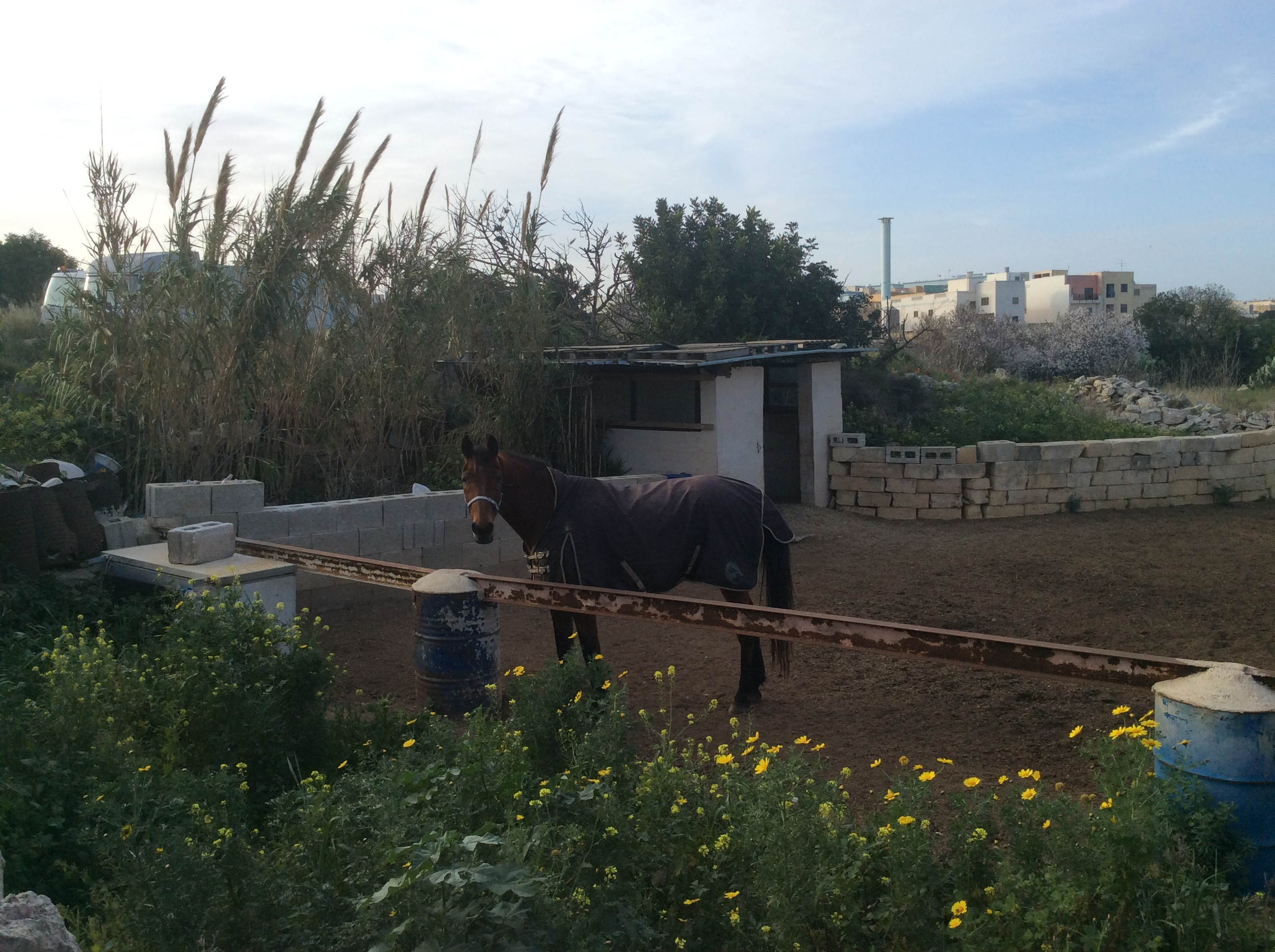
Stable in Swatar

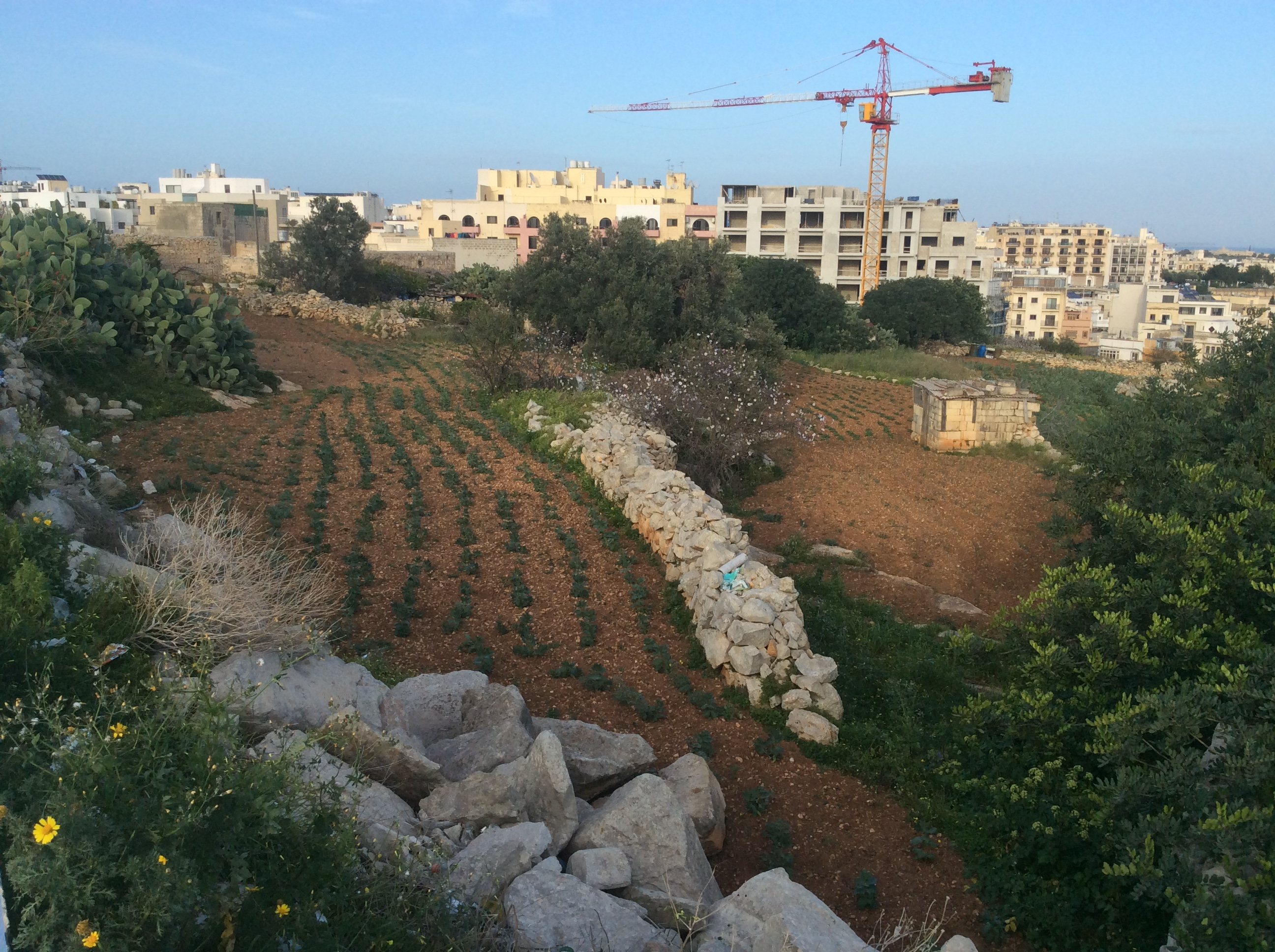
Agricultural land overlooking Msida

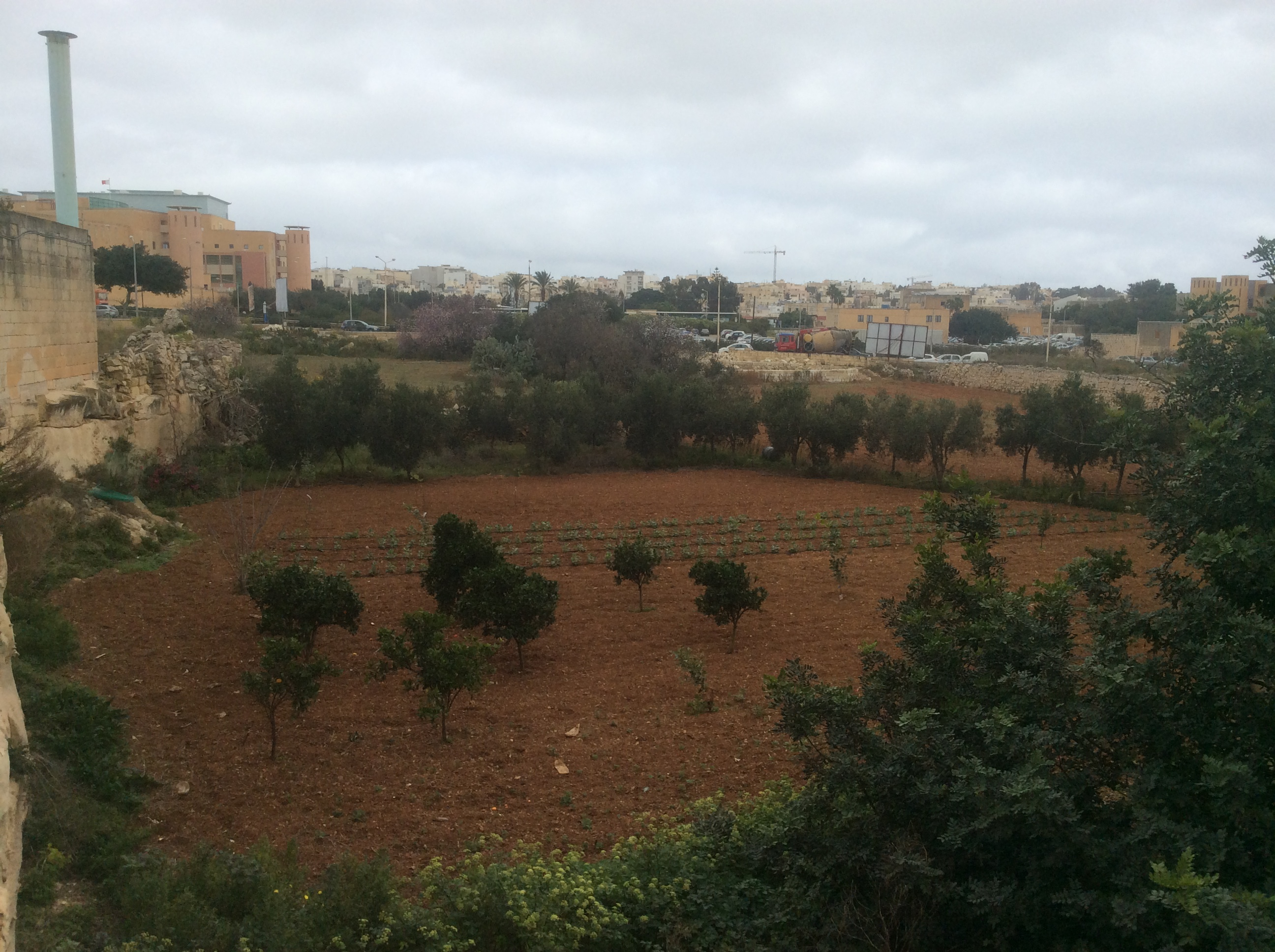
Agricultural land overlooking Tal-Qroqq

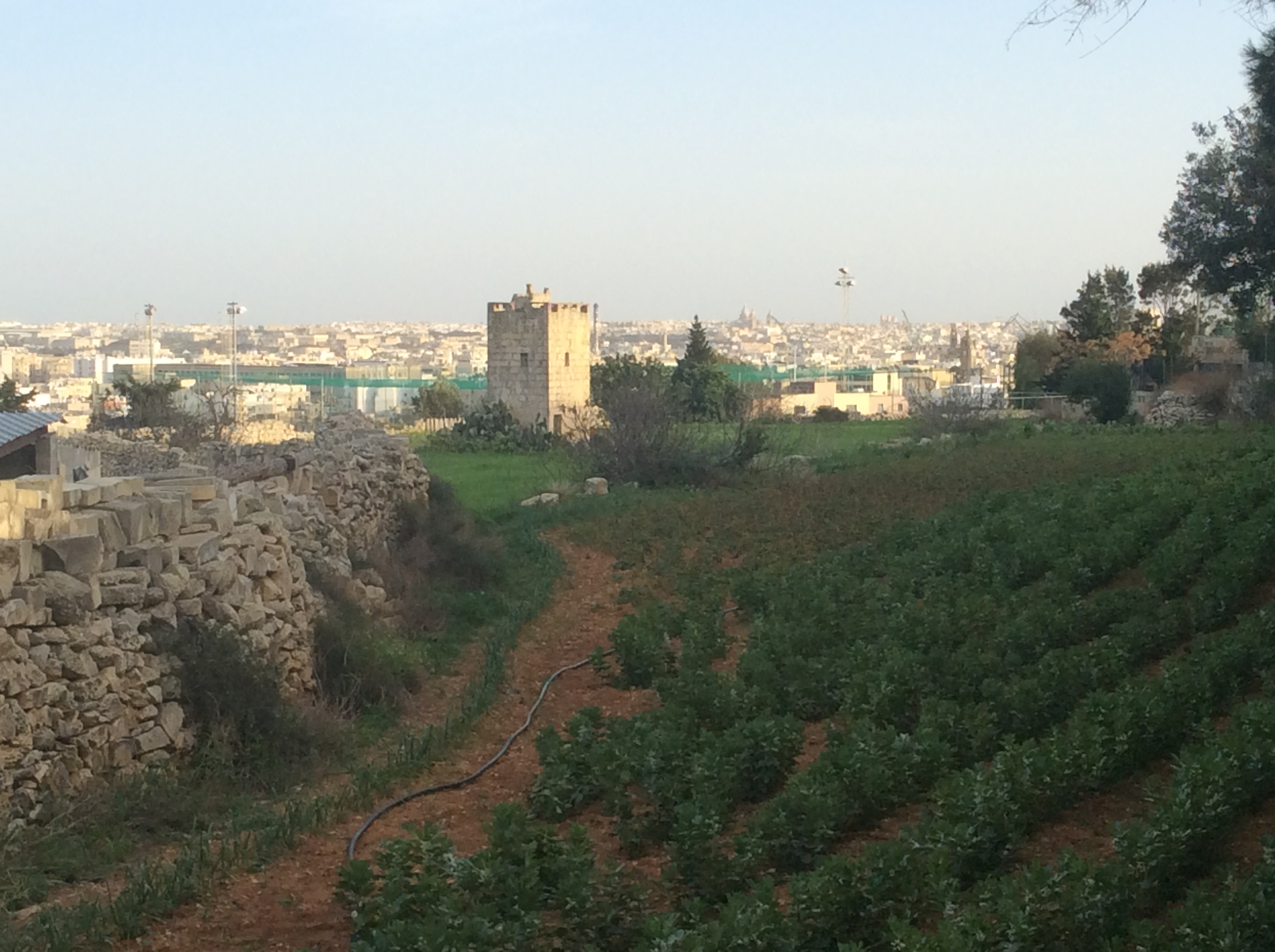
Cultivated land with a folly
Residential buildings
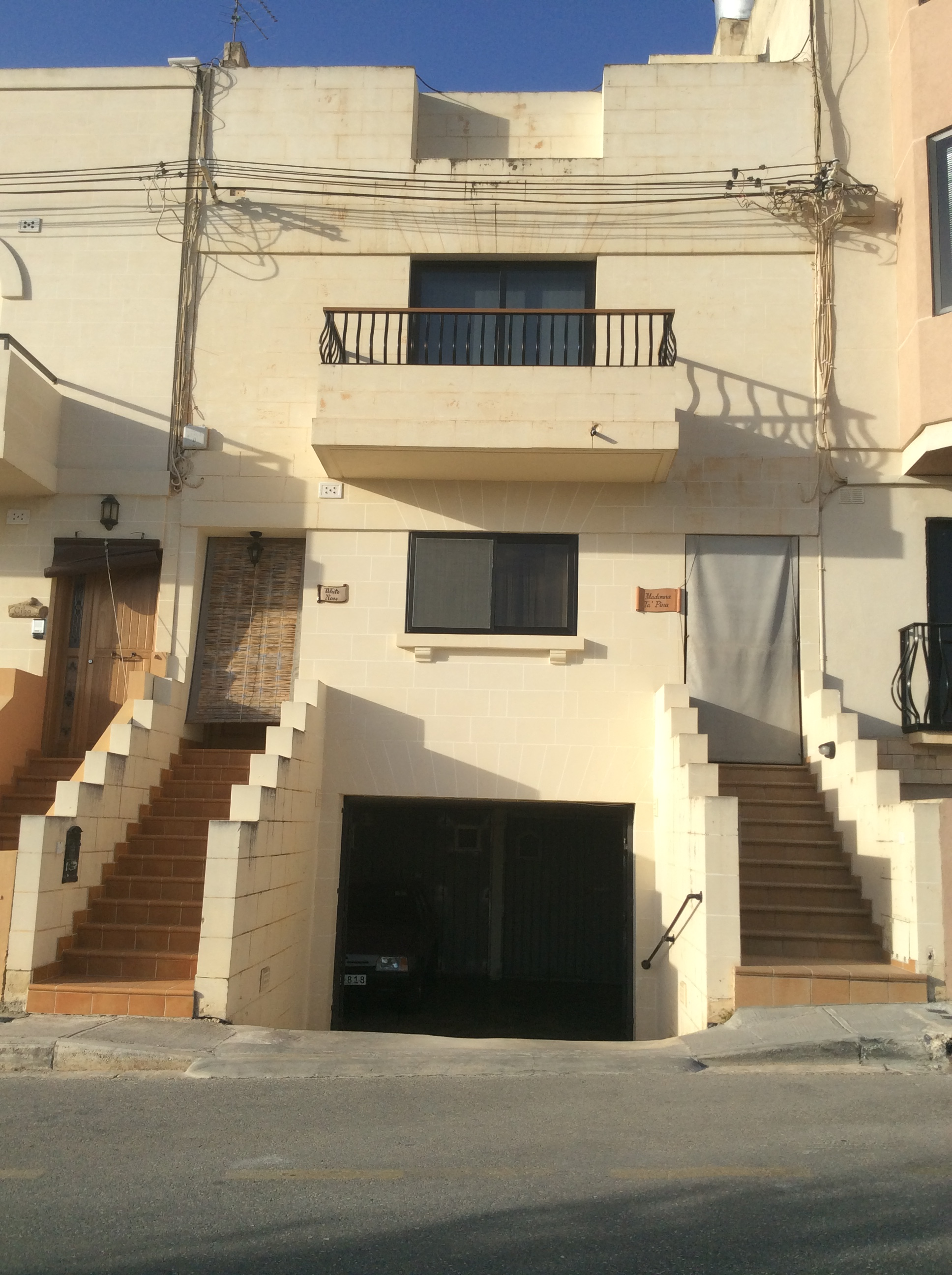
Maisonettes

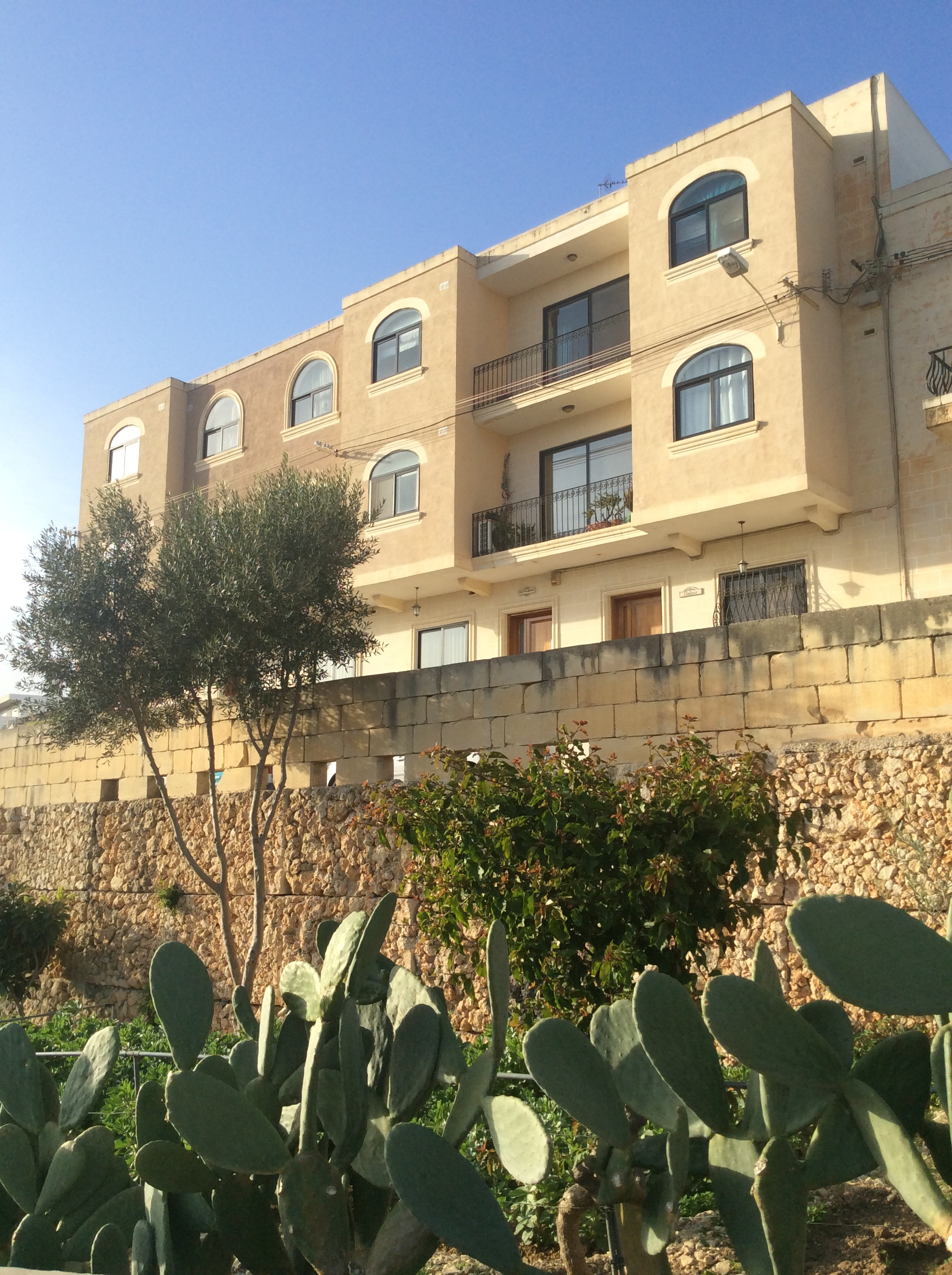
Apartments

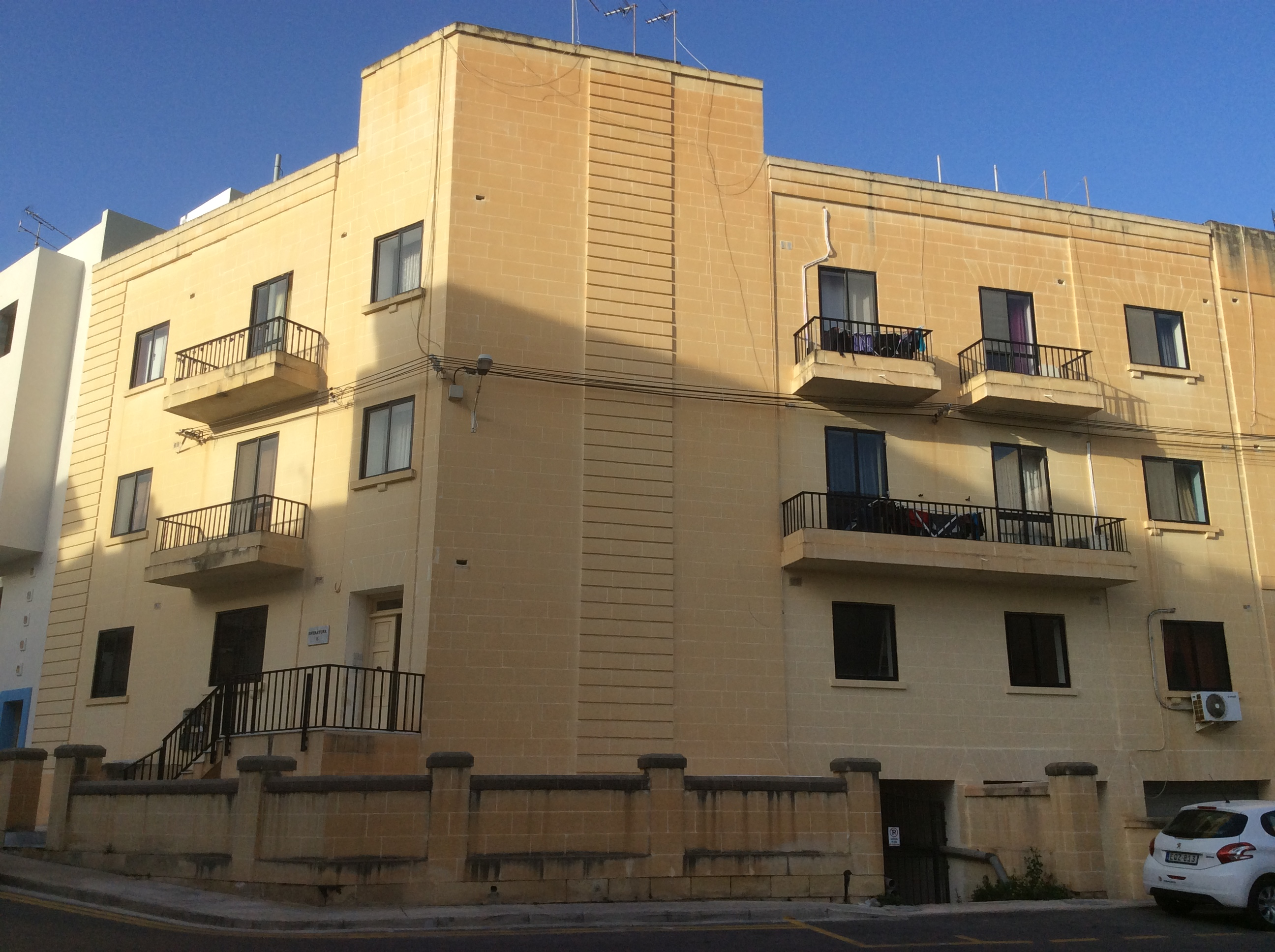
Government built apartments

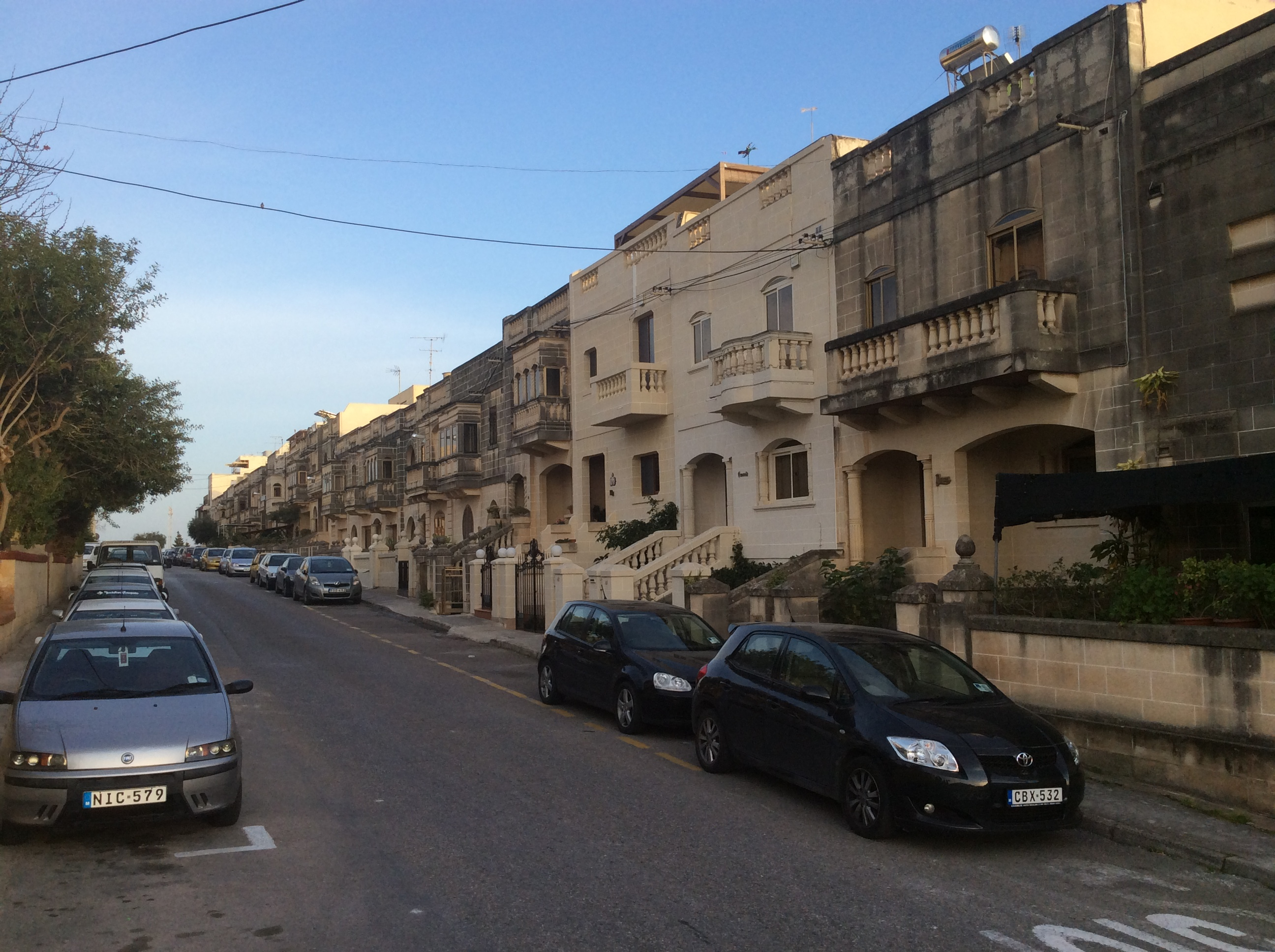
Typical neighborhood in Swatar
Public gardens and landscaping
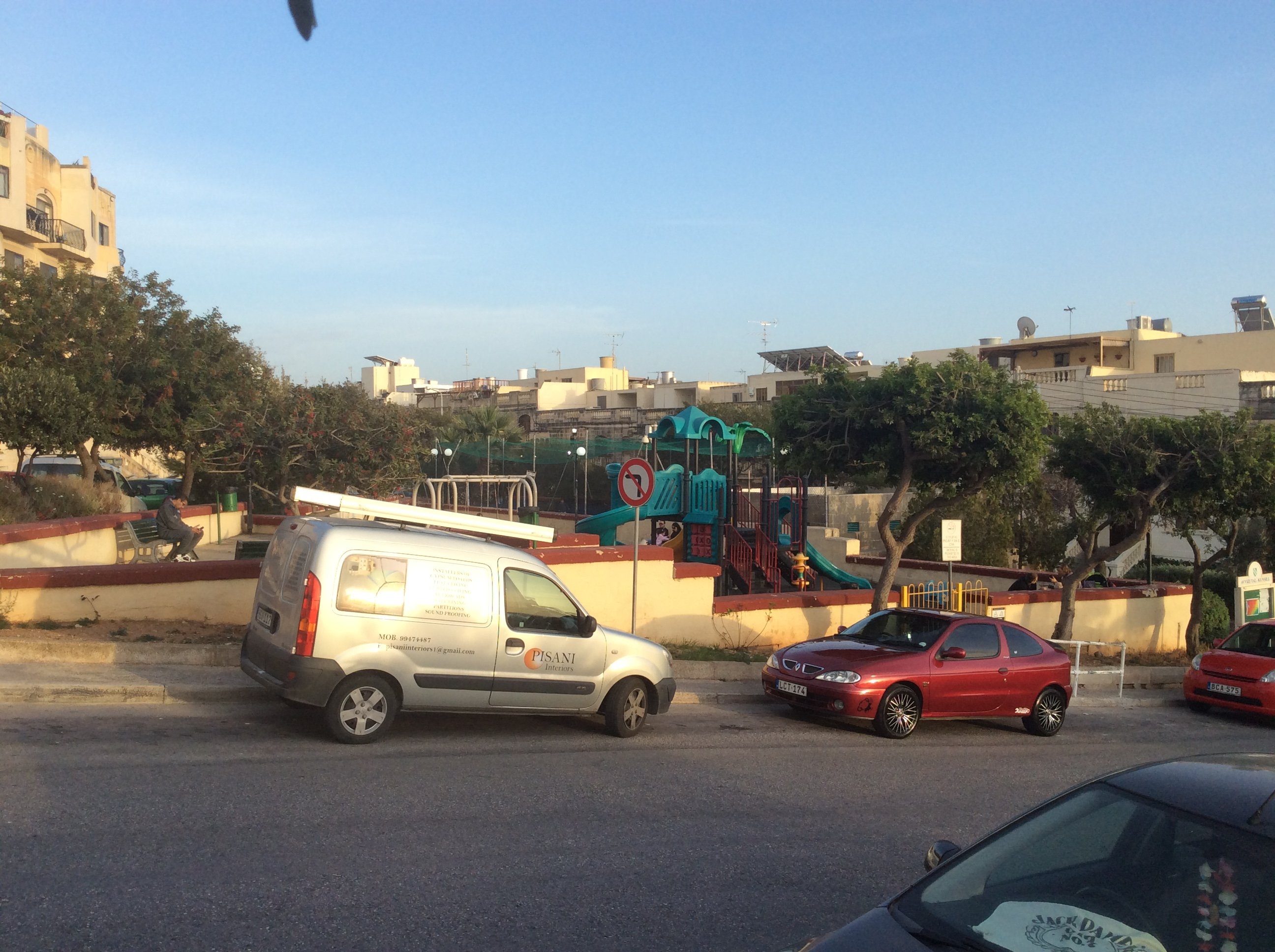
Playingfield

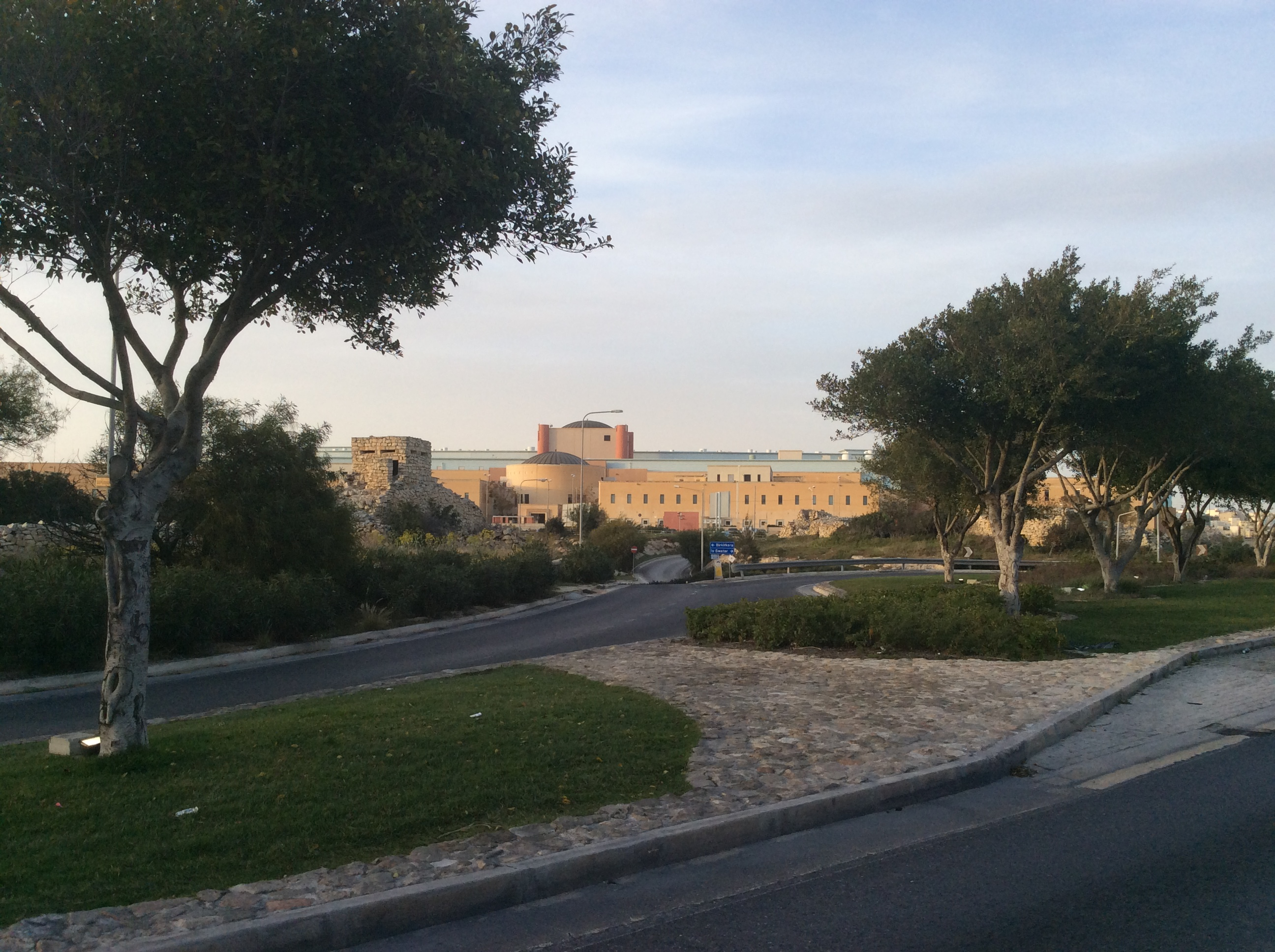
WWII pillbox in limits of Swatar
Business buildings
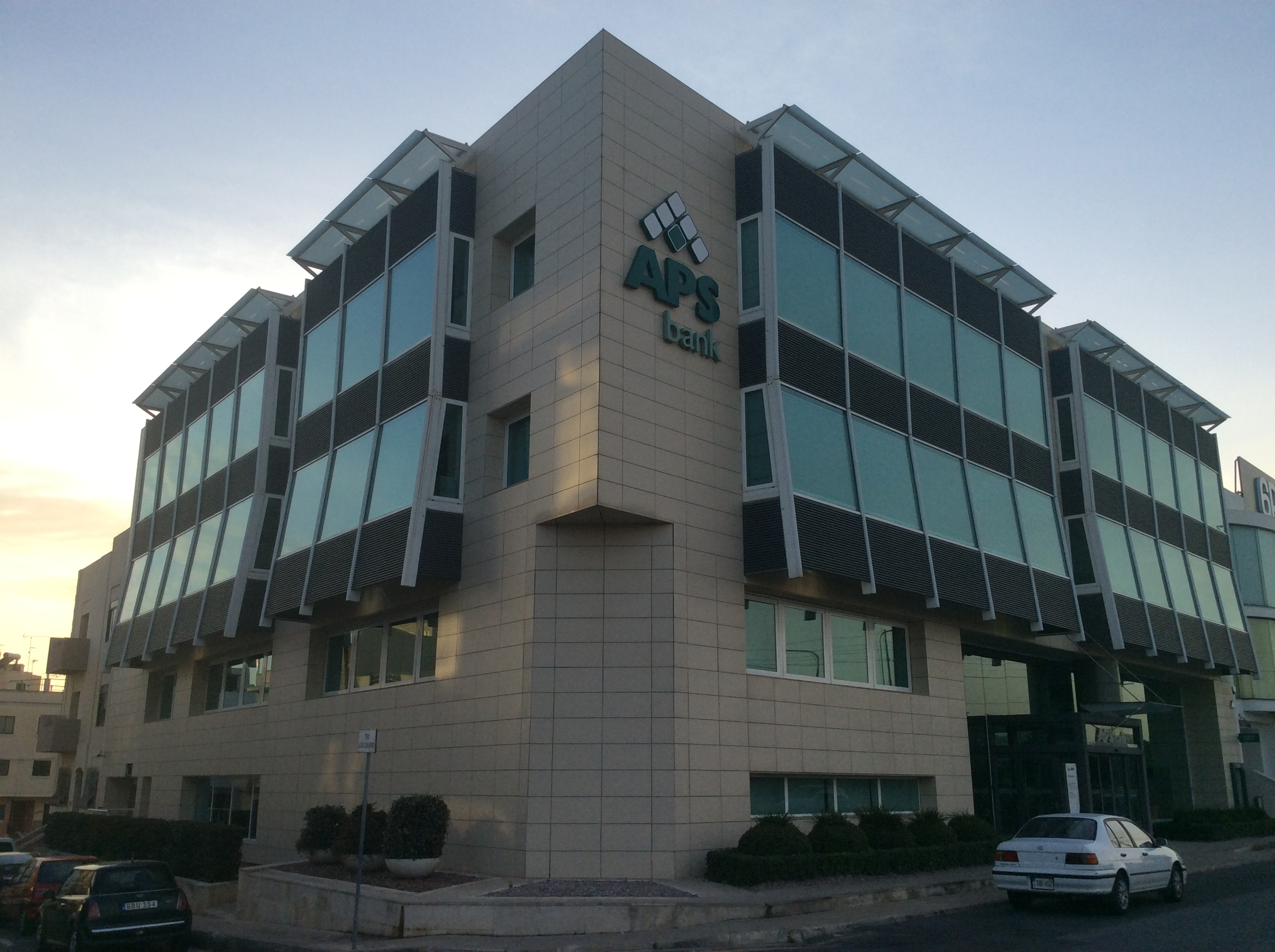
APS Bank headquarters

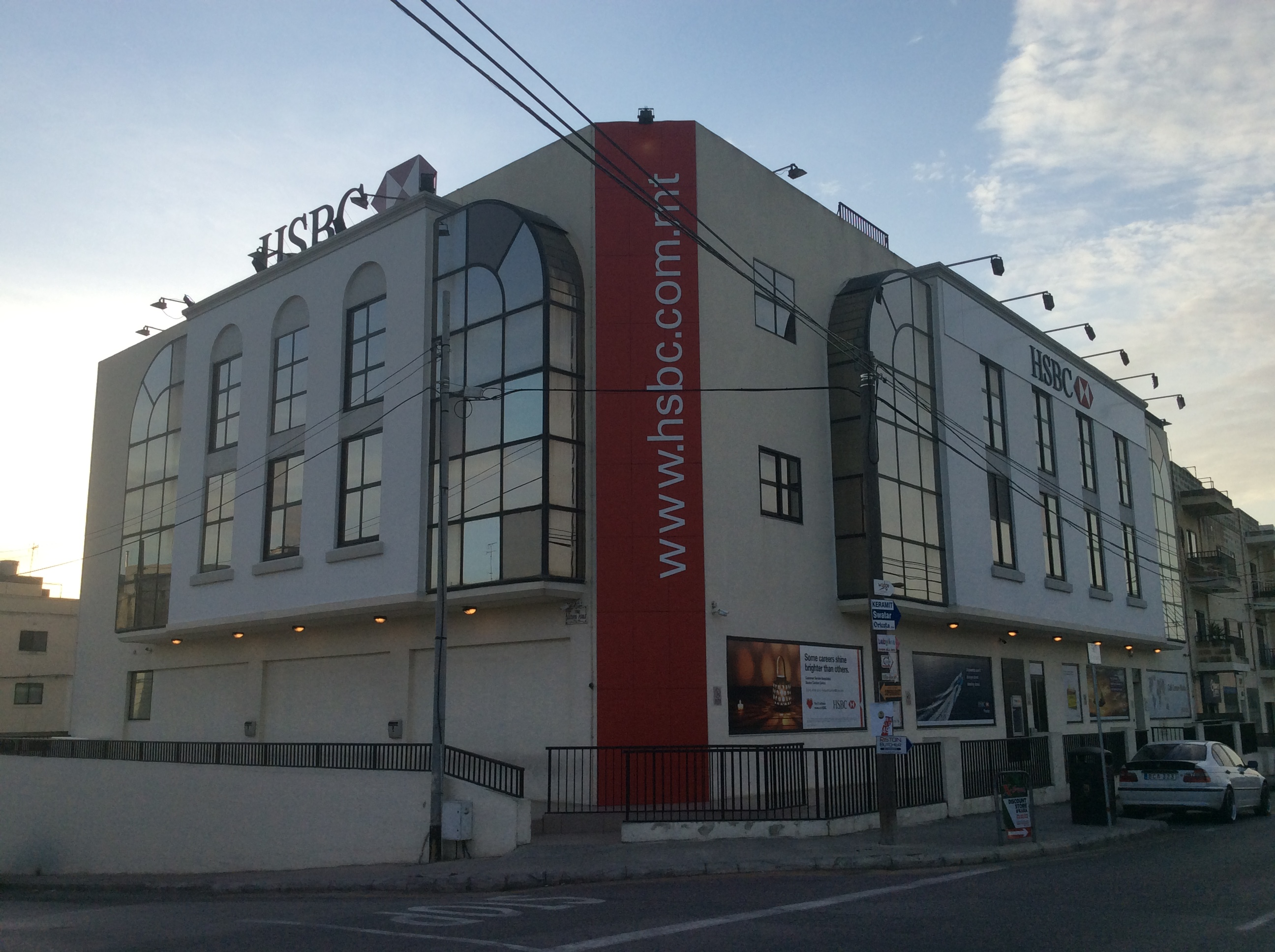
HSBC Call Centre

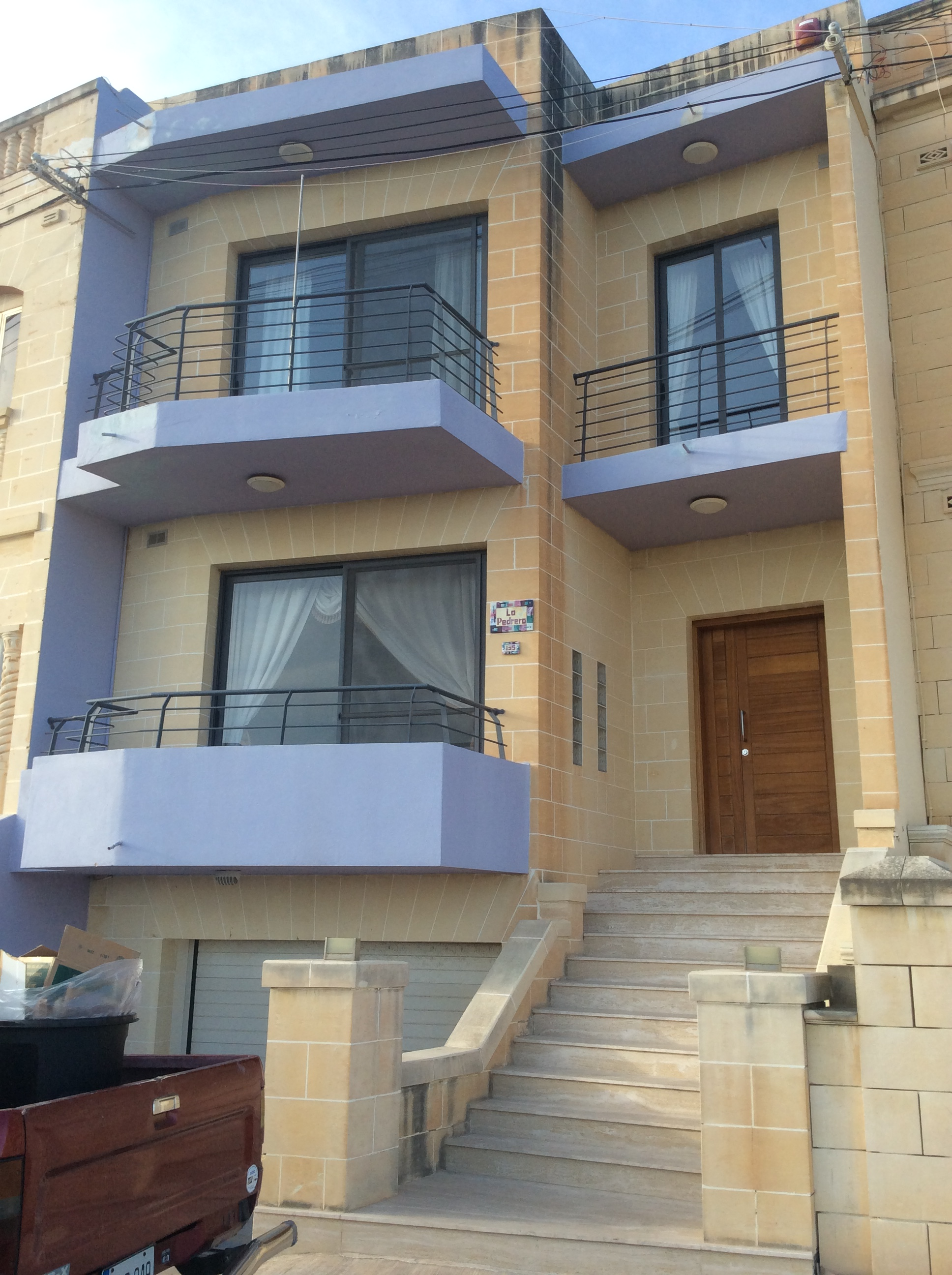
House formerly a Meditation Centre

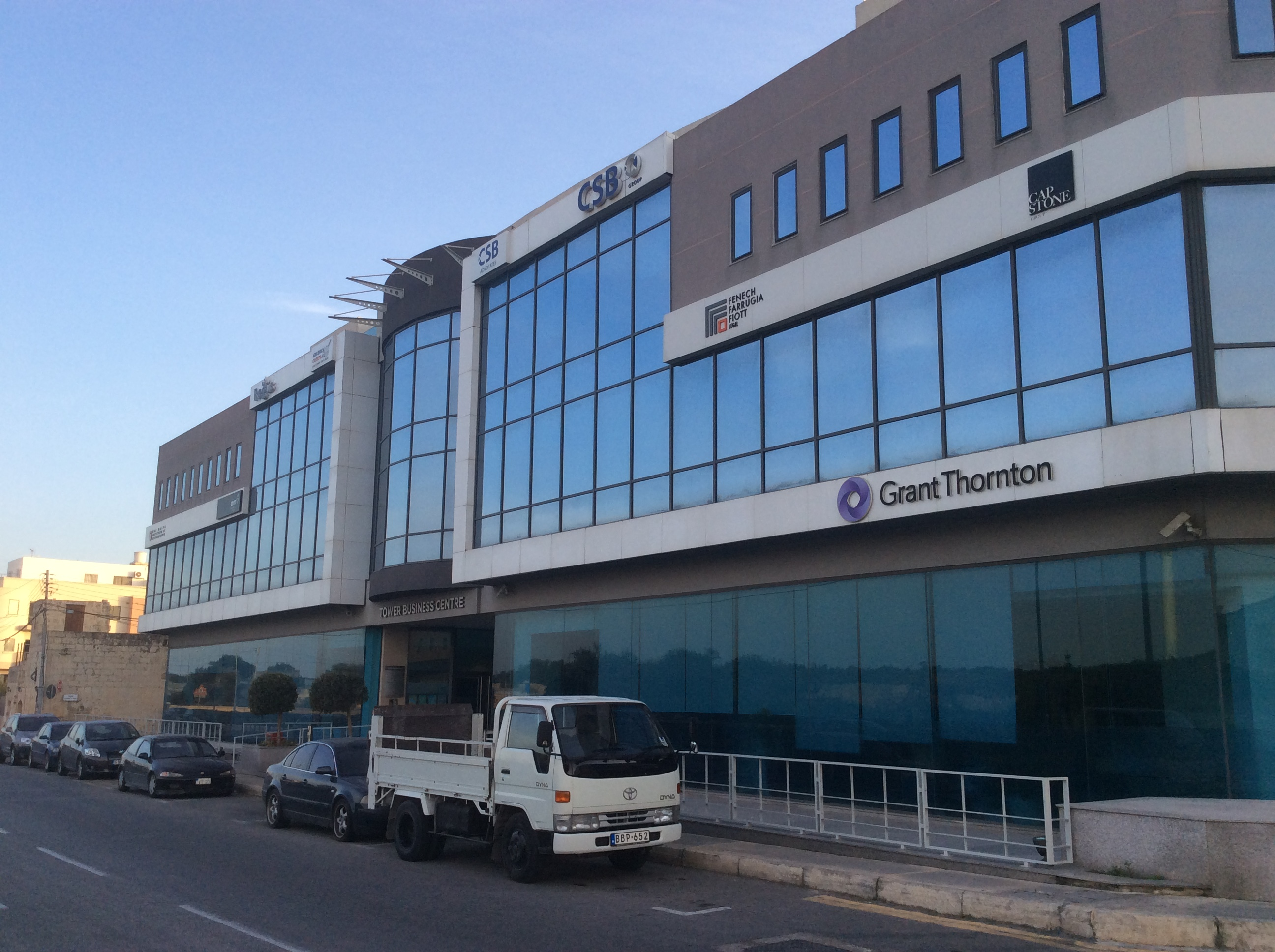
Tower Business Centre

== Schools ==
- St. Martin's College
- International School of Beauty Therapy
- International School of Hairdressing
- Malta Sailing Academy, as part of RYA Sea School

== Businesses ==
- Maypole, as part of a chain of groceries (closed)
- Tower Business Centre
