= Msida =

Msida L-Imsida
- Local council
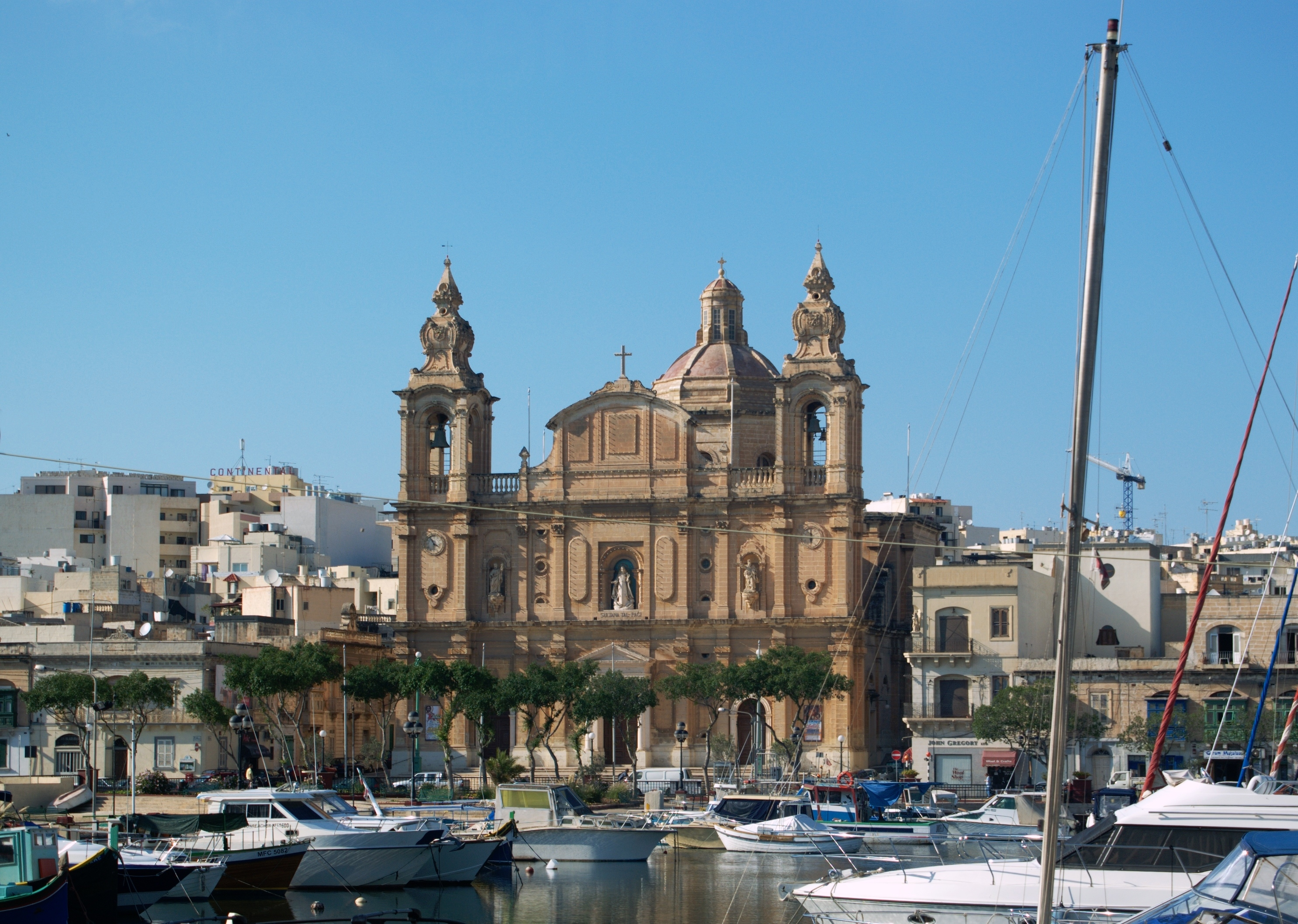
- Msida Parish Church

- Flag Coat of arms
- Motto: Novissima Surgo
- Coordinates: 35°53′52″N 14°29′22″E
- Country: Malta
- Region: Eastern Region
- District: Northern Harbour District
- Borders: Birkirkara, Ħamrun, Gżira, Pietà, San Ġwann, Santa Venera, Ta' Xbiex

Government
  - Mayor: Charles Selvaggi (NP)

Area
  - Total: 1.7 km^{2} (0.66 sq mi)

Population (Jul. 2024)
  - Total: 16,001
  - Density: 9,400/km^{2} (24,000/sq mi)
- Demonym(s): Misidjan (m), Misidjana (f), Misidjani (pl)
- Time zone: UTC+1 (CET)
  - Summer (DST): UTC+2 (CEST)
- Postal code: MSD
- Dialing code: 356
- ISO 3166 code: MT-34
- Patron saint: Saint Joseph
- Day of festa: 1st Sunday after 16 July

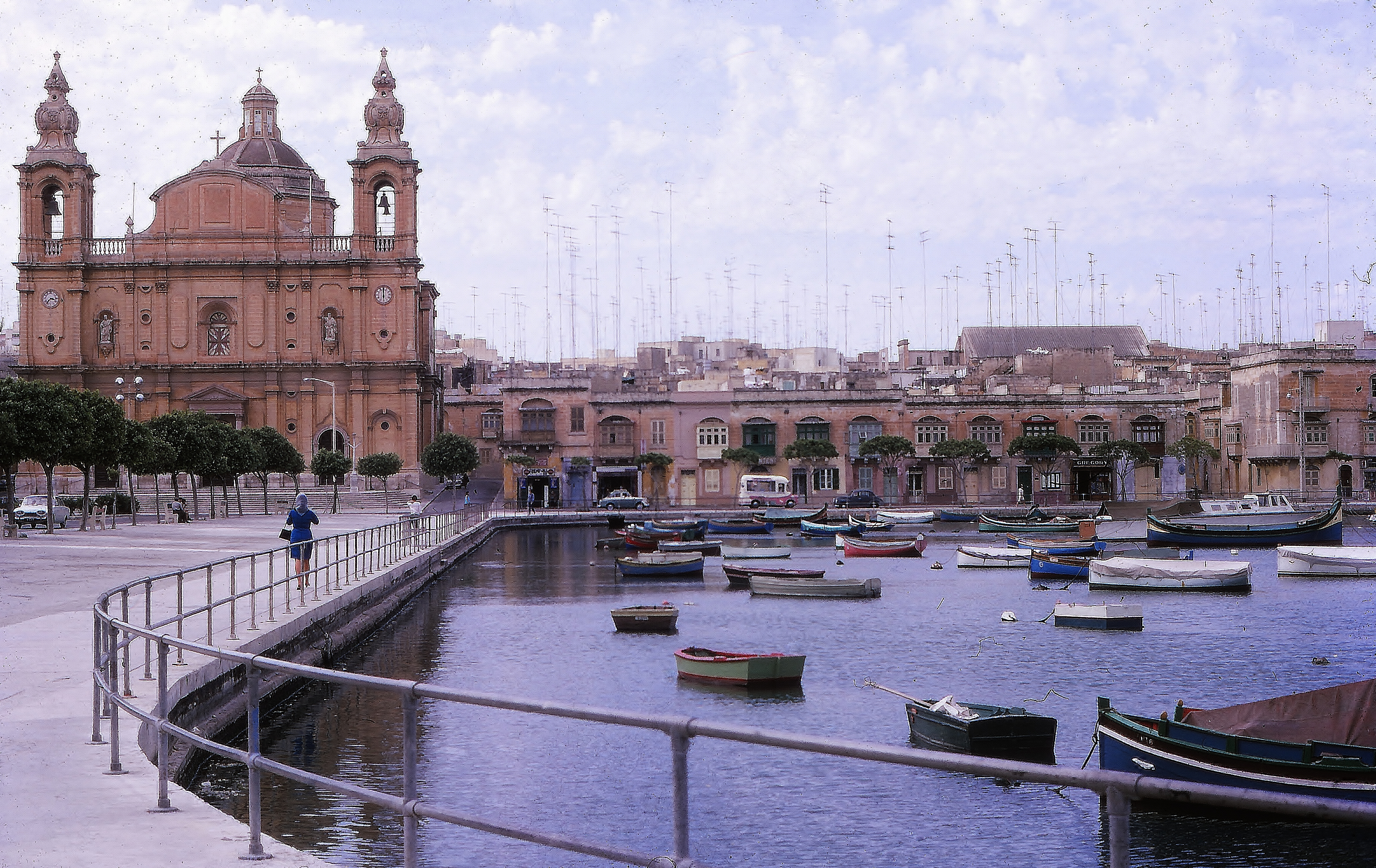
"On the harbour front of this fishing port, I became intrigued by the forest of TV aerials above the roof-tops next to the handsome Parish Church called the Church of Sultana tal-Paci, dedicated to St. Joseph. Msida is located along a creek, south of Gzira and west of Valletta." Brian Harrington Spier, 1967

Msida (Maltese: L-Imsida, Italian: Misida) is a harbour and university town in the Eastern Region of Malta. The population of Msida was 16,001 in July 2024. This included 9,008 males and 6,993 females; 6,017 Maltese nationals and 9,984 foreign nationals.

== Location ==
The town is located just west of Valletta on the northeast coast of Malta. The neighbouring towns of Msida are Ta' Xbiex, Gżira, San Ġwann, Birkirkara, Santa Venera, Hamrun and Pietà.

Msida is an important town for travellers as many bus routes pass through it.

== Etymology ==
The name Msida is said to originate from an Arabic word, meaning "a fisherman's dwelling". However it could also have been derived from the word 'Omm Sidna', meaning 'The Mother of Our Lord' since there could have been a small chapel dedicated to the Blessed Virgin Mary, Mother of God.

== Church and traditions ==
The patron saint of Msida is Saint Joseph while the protector is The Immaculate Conception of the Blessed Virgin Mary.

For a week and a half every July, the town celebrates the feast of Saint Joseph. The feast of Msida is famous for its pole climbing challenge called il-Ġostra. This traditional competition sees a large number of men queuing to climb a well-greased pole in order to reach the top and collect a scarf as a winning sign. The pole is suspended above the sea which allows the many unsuccessful competitors to fall safely and swim back to shore. The two towns that organise il-Gostra regularly are Msida and St. Julians.

=== St. Joseph Church ===
Msida parish church, dedicated to San Ġużepp (Saint Joseph) was built in 1889. Under the religious guidance of Bishop Carmelo Scicluna and the main benefactor Mgr Francesco Falzon Debono who contributed financially towards its building, the church was erected to replace the old church of the Immaculate Conception. The foundation stone was laid on 4 April 1886. The building was finalised by 1889 and the church was officially consecrated on 22 April 1894. Architect Andrea Grima was responsible for the plans, their execution, and all works involved to build the church.

== Notable places ==
Msida is situated right on the coastal creek. Walking along the coast one can see various marinas, boat slipways as well as many locals fishing from shore.

Msida became a parish in 1867. The settlement was centered on the hovels located inward at Valley Road, and some nearby ancillary roads and pathways which led up to the quaint district of Villambrosa. This status did not last long however, as a new parish Ħamrun was hived off in 1881. Today the lowest part of Villambrosa Street remains a silent reminder of Msida's jurisdiction in this area. Msida would also eventually see parts of its territory lost to new parishes at Santa Venera in 1918, Pietà in 1968 and Ta' Xbiex in 1969.

Its population, which at one time numbered 11,500, thus also dwindled to a mere 6,000. However, the recent aforementioned demands as well as residential developments in the outlying suburb of Swatar, have now seen an increase to more than 7600 inhabitants.

Today, Msida has seen some development influenced by the student population as well as various new service industries that have emerged in recent years. While the town houses a number of university students, mostly Gozitans, it remains primarily a commercial and transit hub rather than a dedicated university town.

== Geography ==
The lower part of Msida lies at the outlet of a valley and is a fulcrum for heavy traffic going to Sliema, Valletta, Birkirkara and Mater Dei Hospital. When it rains, water rushes down towards the sea from surrounding cities at higher levels and often causes floods, bringing traffic to a halt in the area opposite the Parish Church dedicated to St. Joseph. Msida also hosts an old rock hewn chapel dedicated to the Immaculate Conception, a rarity of its kind.

Msida has also experienced a lot of reclamation from the sea. The town centre and surrounding areas which were located below sea-level were all reclaimed from the sea, after World War II. A new project which intends to catch more surface rainwater running should also considerably remedy a perennial flooding problem which affects this area as well as nearby towns.

== Media ==
Msida host two local newspapers. The Leħen il-Misidjani ("The Voice of the Misidjani") is produced and edited by the local band club the Għaqda Melita Banda San Ġużepp Msida. The "Leħen il-Misidjani" gathers information on most of the communities, clubs and associations based in an around Msida.

Another newspaper is the Id f'Id ("Hand in Hand"), produced by the Parish and the Għaqda Armar Msida. It contains information on church activities, religious activities in Msida and the Feasts.

== University of Malta ==
The University of Malta is situated in a part of Msida known as Tal-Qroqq which rests on higher ground. Msida is also home to the Ġ.F. Abela Junior College and a State Nursing Home.

== The IMO International Maritime Law Institute (IMLI) ==
IMLI was established in 1988 under an Agreement concluded between IMO and the Government of Malta. It commenced its first academic year in October 1989. Its campus is at the University of Malta.

== Sports ==
Msida is home to Msida Saint-Joseph F.C., the local football team currently playing in the Second division of Malta. The team colours are Red and White. Msida also hosts the Msida Red Stars A.F.C, a local 7-a-side team which participates in the I.A.S.C (Inter Amateur Soccer Competition), and Msida Boċċi Klabb (Club), the local "boċċi" team.

== Mater Dei Hospital ==
The Mater Dei Hospital is located in the outskirts of Msida. It was inaugurated by the prime minister of Malta Dr. Gonzi in June 2007 and has a total floor area of 232,000m^{2} and approximately 8,000 rooms. It also houses a teaching facility for the University of Malta.

The hospital has cost the Maltese people Lm 200,000,000, a considerable increase compared to its original estimate of Lm 83,000,000. It was intended to be a specialised centre but was eventually changed to a general hospital with a change in government.

== Msida Marina ==
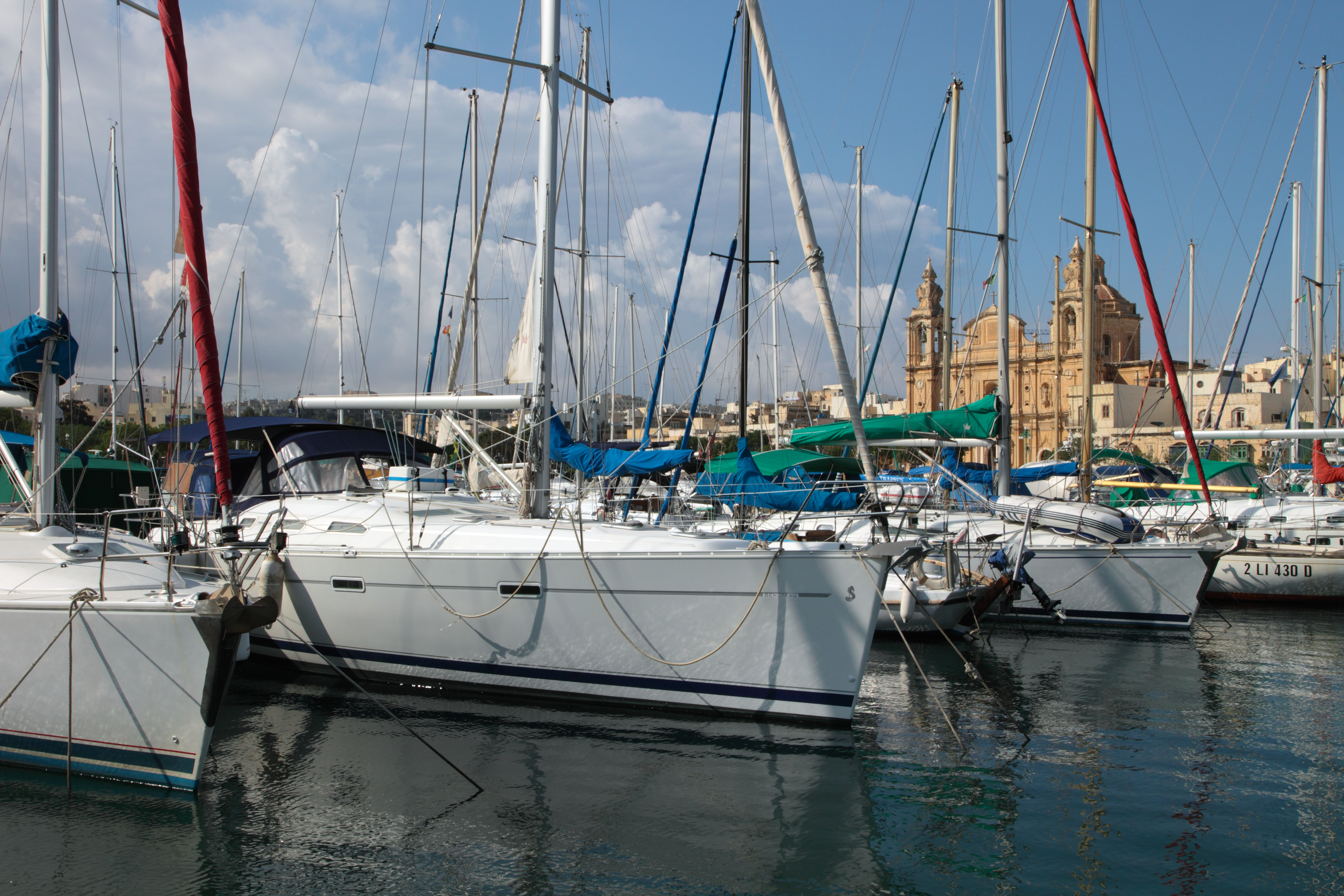
Boats in Msida marina

In the late 19th century, a floating British navy hydraulic dock was also planned at the central part of Msida close to where the Torpedo Depot used to stand. The plan was soon aborted but instead, this area would in later years experience a booming yacht marina service, which has been growing ever since, thanks to new incentive policies issued by the central government.

== Msida Local Council ==
Current local council members are:

- Charles Selvaggi (Mayor, PN)
- Christine Amaira (Vice-Mayor, PN)
- Margaret Baldacchino Cefai (PL)
- Maurice Agius (PN)
- Alfred Farrugia (PN)
- Chris Borg (PN)
- Jean Claude Borg (PL)
- Nicholas Chirchop (PL)
- Andrew Mallia (PL)

== Zones in Msida ==
- Misraħ il-Barrieri
- Msida Yacht Marina
- Swatar
- Tal-Qroqq
- Il-Wied
- Ta' Xmiexi
- Ta' Sissla
- Ta' Ziza
- Tas-Salib
- Tat-Tigan

== Culture ==
Msida traditionally celebrates the Feast of Saint Joseph on the first Sunday after 16 July every year. The local football club is Msida Saint-Joseph F.C.

== See also ==
- St Joseph's Church, Msida
