= Our Lady of Pompeii Church =

Our Lady of Pompeii Church or Our Lady of Pompei Church may refer to:

- Holy Rosary Church (Bridgeport, Connecticut) or Church of Our Lady of Pompeii, in the United States
- Our Lady of Pompei Church, Victoria in Malta
- Our Lady of Pompeii Church (Manhattan) in New York, United States
- Our Lady of Pompeii Roman Catholic Church, Yoogali in New South Wales, Australia
- Parish Church of Our Lady of Pompei, Marsaxlokk in Malta
- Shrine of the Virgin of the Rosary of Pompei in Pompei, Italy
