= Bettina (disambiguation) =

Bettina is a feminine given name.

Bettina may also refer to:

== People ==
- Judith Bettina, American soprano and music educator
- Melio Bettina (1916–1996), American boxer
- Bettina Bush (born 1973), stage name Bettina, voice actor and singer
- Bettina or Bettina Graziani, professional names of French model Simone Micheline Bodin (1925–2015)

== Other uses ==
- Bettina (horse), a racehorse
- Bettina (opera), by Friedrich Schenker and Karl Mickel, debuted 1987
- Bettina, Texas, a ghost town
- 250 Bettina, an asteroid
- Bettina Tower, Gudja, Malta
- Cyclone Bettina (1968)

== See also ==
- Ta' Bettina Tower, Marsaxlokk, Malta
- Betina, a village in Croatia
