= Tas-Silġ =

Multi-period sanctuary and archaeological site

- Ta' Berikka
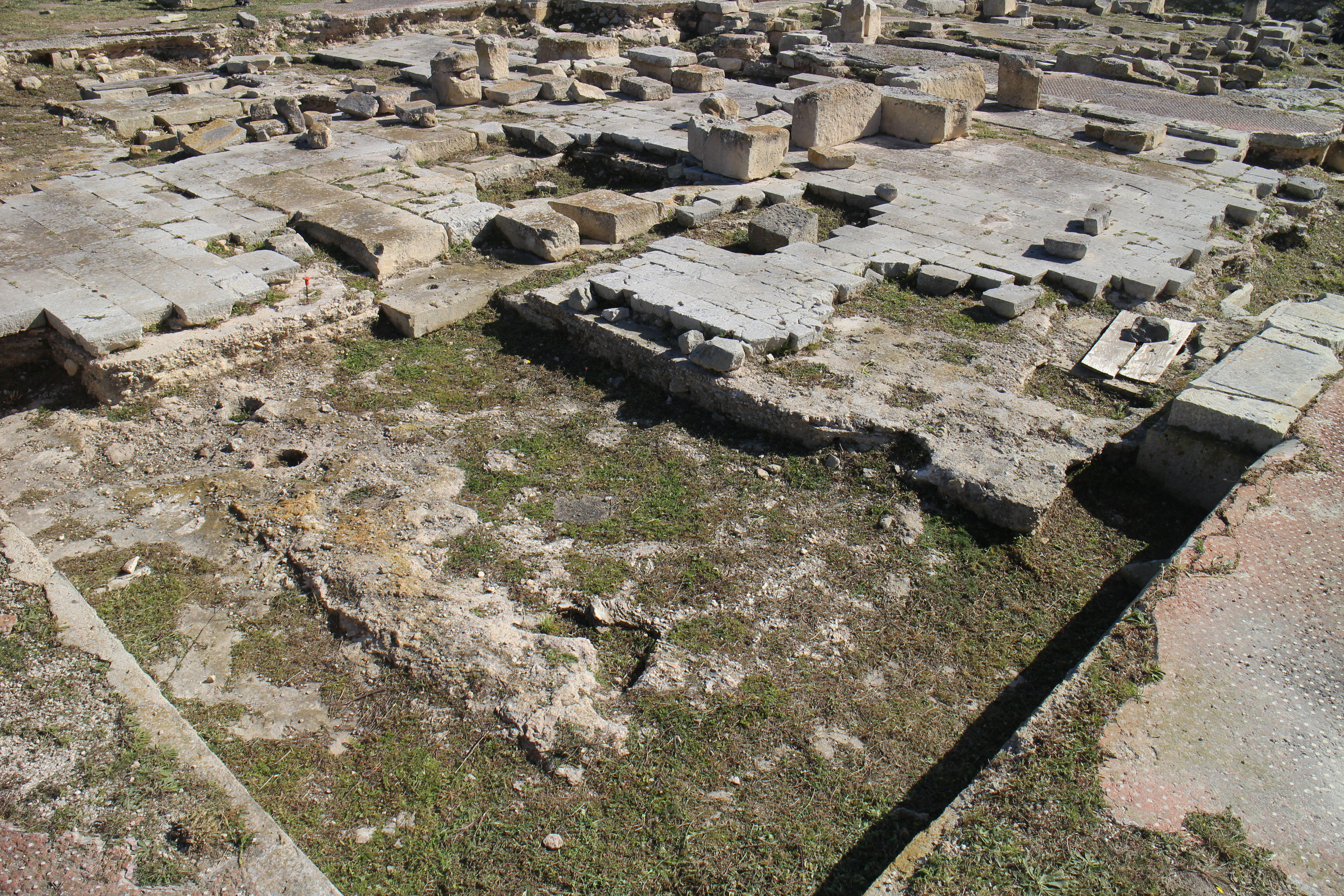
- Part of the late ruins at Tas-Silġ

- Location within Malta
- 35°50′45.3″N 14°33′7.5″E
- Type: Temple; Village; Monastery; Fortification
- Periods: Tarxien phase Bronze Age; Phoenician; Roman; Byzantine
- Location: Żejtun/Marsaxlokk, Malta
- Part of: Megalithic Temples of Malta

History
- Built: c. 2500 BC
- Abandoned: c. 870 AD

Site notes
- Material: Limestone
- Excavation dates: 1963–1970; 1996–2005
- Condition: Ruins
- Owner: Government of Malta
- Management: Heritage Malta
- Public access: By appointment

Tas-Silġ (Maltese pronunciation: [tɐsːiːldʒ]) is a rounded hilltop on the southeast coast of the island of Malta overlooking Marsaxlokk Bay and close to the town of Żejtun. Tas-Silġ is a major multi-period sanctuary site with archaeological remains covering 4000 years, from the Neolithic to the ninth century. The site includes a Megalithic temple complex dating from the early third millennium BCE and a Phoenician and Punic sanctuary dedicated to the goddess Astarte. During the Roman era, the site became an international religious complex dedicated to the goddess Juno, helped by its location along major maritime trading routes, with the site being mentioned by Cicero.

The original name of the hill where the site is found is Ta' Berikka; the name 'Tas-Silġ' derives from that of the nearby Church of Our Lady of the Snows (Maltese: Knisja tal-Madonna tas-Silġ), built in the 1800s. Excavated as part of an archaeological project in the 1960s, the site was abandoned for several decades. In 1996, the University of Malta restarted excavations, uncovering Neolithic and Late Bronze Age remains, and substantial deposits associated with ritual offerings in the Punic era.

== Topography and toponymy ==
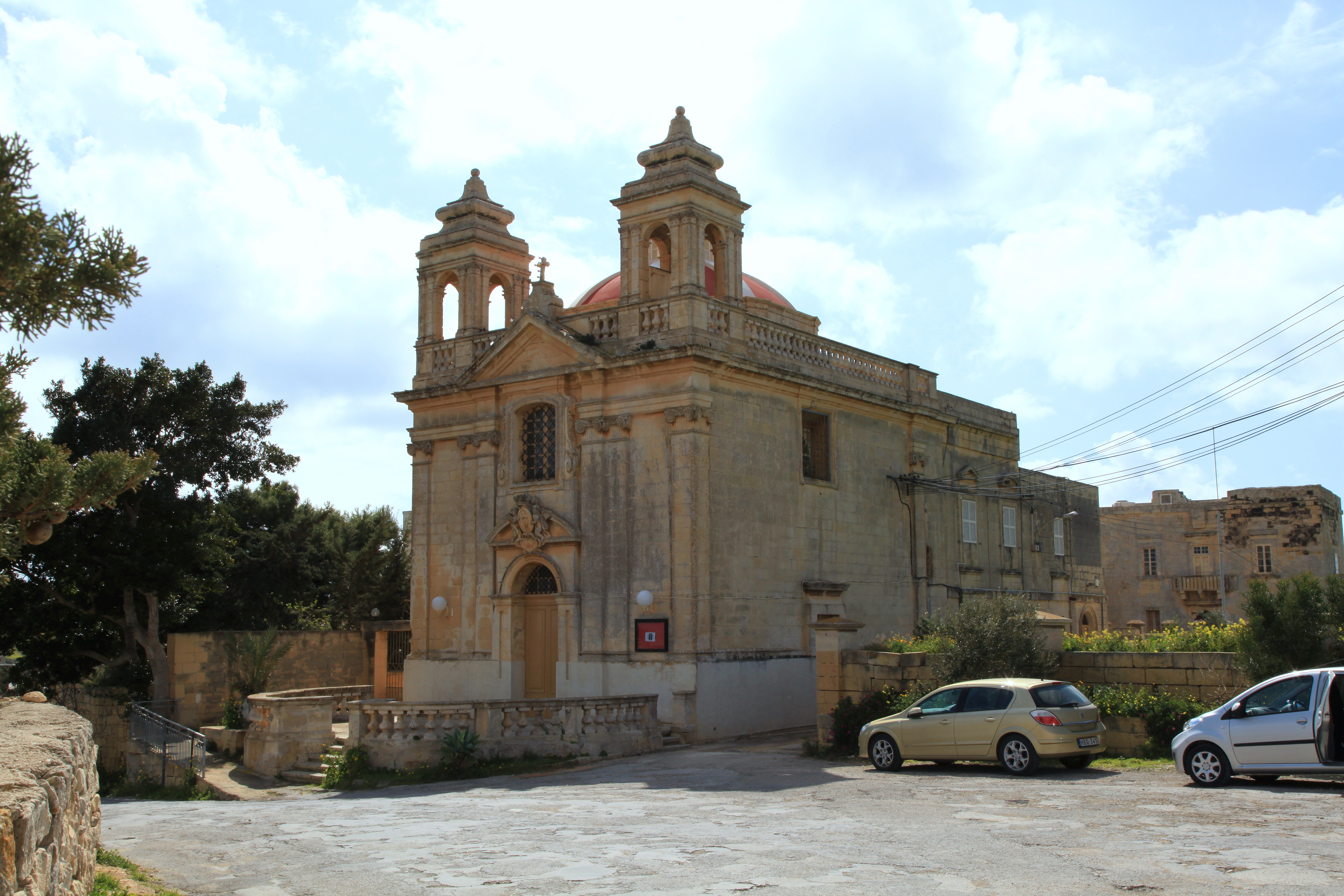
The nearby Church of Our Lady of the Snows, from which Tas-Silġ takes its name

Tas-Silġ is in the south-eastern part of the island of Malta, close to the harbour of Marsaxlokk. The name derives from that of a small church dedicated to Our Lady of the Snows, which is found at the crossroads where the country road from Żejtun forks out in two directions, to Delimara peninsula and Xrobb il-Għaġin to the south-east and to the village of Marsaxlokk to the south-west. Fort Tas-Silġ, a British-era polygonal fort, stands at the highest point of an elongated hill further south. The lower and smaller hill on which the excavations have been conducted is called 'Ta' Berikka', although the tradition of calling it 'Tas-Silġ' is now well established. The site commands views of the Marsaxlokk harbour to the south and overlooks two other bays, Marsascala and St Thomas' Bay. The site is surrounded by man-made terraced fields.

The archaeological remains of Tas-Silġ rest on a hilltop overlooking Marsaxlokk Bay and St Thomas' Bay in south-east Malta. Archaeological remains prove activity by humans for millennia, with significant activity happening during the Phoenician and Roman eras. Over the past centuries, the Tas-Silġ remains were debated by various scholars, however archaeological studies carried out by the Missione Archeologica ltaliana in the 1960s linked the remains with the renowned temple of Juno mentioned by classical authors. The remains remained visible ever since the classical era, and were described by antiquarians and travellers since the Early Modern period. The archaeological remains sprawl over two large areas to the north and south of the Żejtun to Marsaxlokk road (Triq Xrobb l-Għaġin). Fields in both areas were selected for investigation by the Missione Archeologica ltaliana. These were excavated between 1963 and 1970. Archaeological excavations were also resumed in the 1990s in both the northern and southern enclosures of the site.

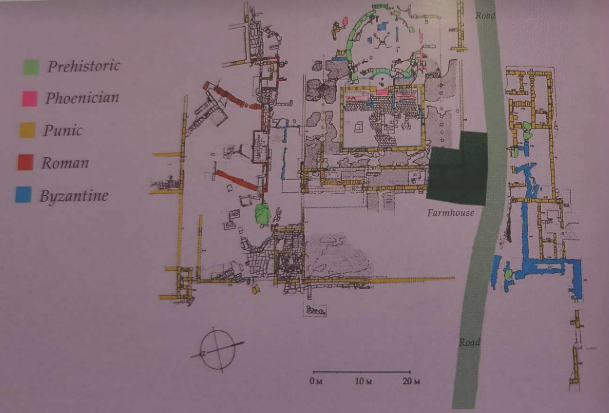
Plans of the excavation conducted by the Italian 'Missione Archeologica' expedition in the 1960s

== History ==
=== Megalithic Temple and Bronze Age settlement ===
The excavations of an Italian Archaeological Mission at Tas-Silġ in 1963-72 were designed to investigate the remains of the Punic and later temples identified on the site. However, during the excavations, archaeologists unexpectedly found a prehistoric site beneath the Ancient and Late antiquity levels.

The area was first inhabited when a temple was built in the Tarxien phase of Maltese prehistory, sometime around 3000 to 2500 BC. Few remains from the original temple can be seen, but the scatter of megaliths over the hill suggests that there was a large complex with at least 3 temples and possibly a village surrounding it. A D-shaped setting of large blocks that was part of the four-apsed temple still exists as it was later incorporated into the other buildings on the site. In the Bronze Age, the temple was probably converted into a settlement, as had been done in other sites such as Borġ in-Nadur.

In the deepest layer of deposits, archaeologists found various artifacts including pottery, lithics, and a standing fat lady. From the Bronze Age layer, some sherds, stone tools and pottery were found. Other evidence from the Bronze Age consists of the large amount of handiwork.

=== Punic, Hellenistic and Roman temple ===
After the Phoenicians took over Malta in around 700 BC, they built a Punic temple to Astarte incorporating standing remains of the earlier temple. An extension was added to the curved facade, and a monumental doorway flanked by two pilasters and topped with a huge stone slab was built. The sanctuary's importance eventually grew and a portico was added around 300 BC. Some parts of the temple, including a tower, might have been designed as a fortification to help defend it from possible invaders.

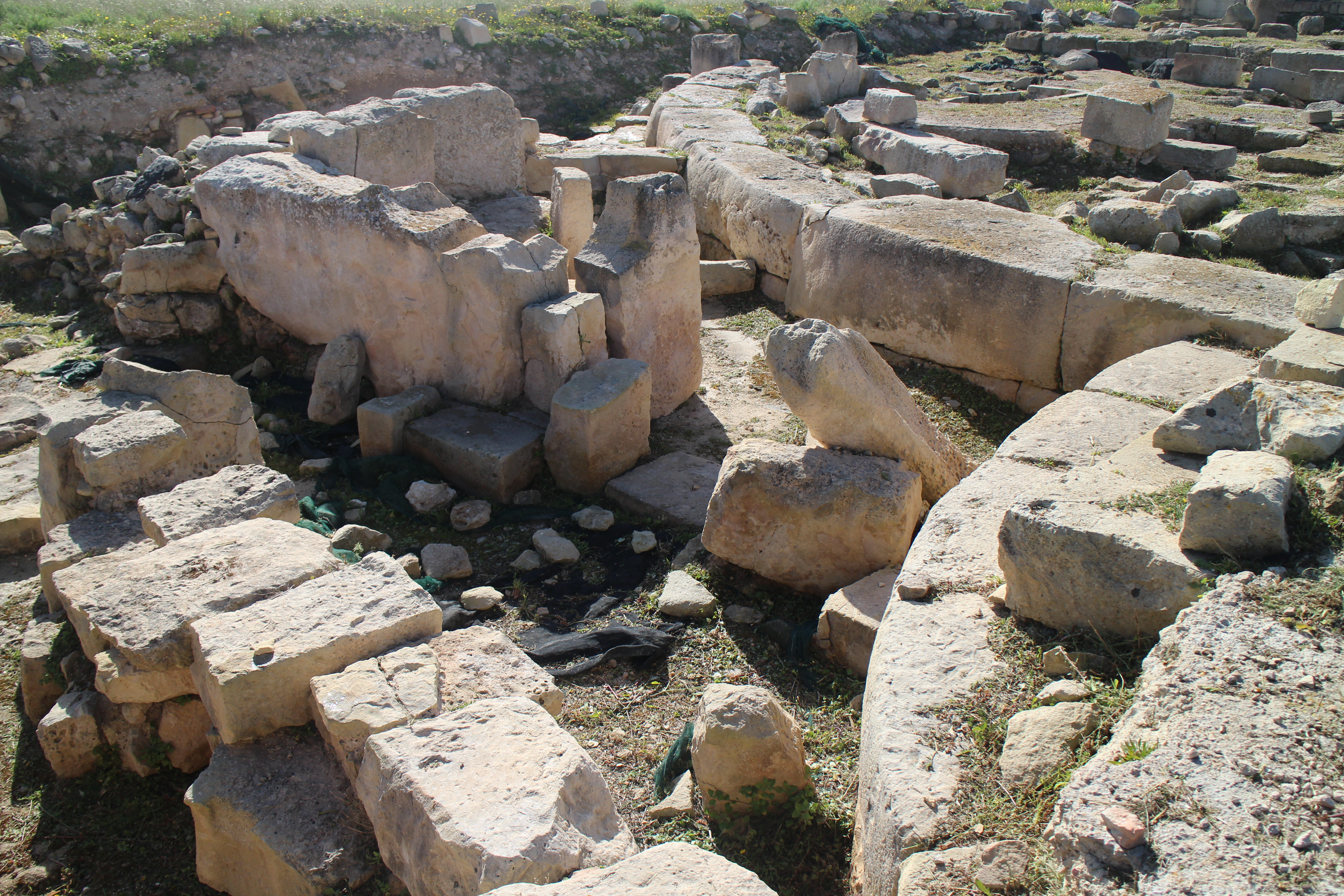
Megalithic remains at Tas-Silġ.

A threshold slab pierced by three libation holes that divided the eastern part of the temple and the western side, as well as a series of ashlar foundation walls for a platform built to the south of the main sanctuary still exist. Around this area, various remains were found including pottery, ash, animal bones, coins and sherds. Some of these sherds have votive inscriptions. It is claimed that the Cippi of Melqart might have originally been at the Tas-Silġ temple, but their origin is disputed.

The presence of significant remains of pottery on the site found during the excavations suggests the existence of nearby workshops which produced ceramic ware intended to be used within the temple site. However, the presence of imported ware was also confirmed by the make-up of the pottery. Numerous Punic bronze coins were also found on site.

In the Roman era, the Punic temple was converted into a sanctuary of Juno, the Roman equivalent to Astarte. In 70 BC, Cicero mentioned the temple in his In Verrem, saying that the temple was revered by everyone including pirates and Numidian princes, but the Roman governor of Sicily had stolen some of its treasures. Some Roman material was discovered in various deposits around a well in the lower terrace of Tas-Silġ. Red Roman flooring, opus signinam, made from crushed pottery, lime and white marble tiles, still exists on site.

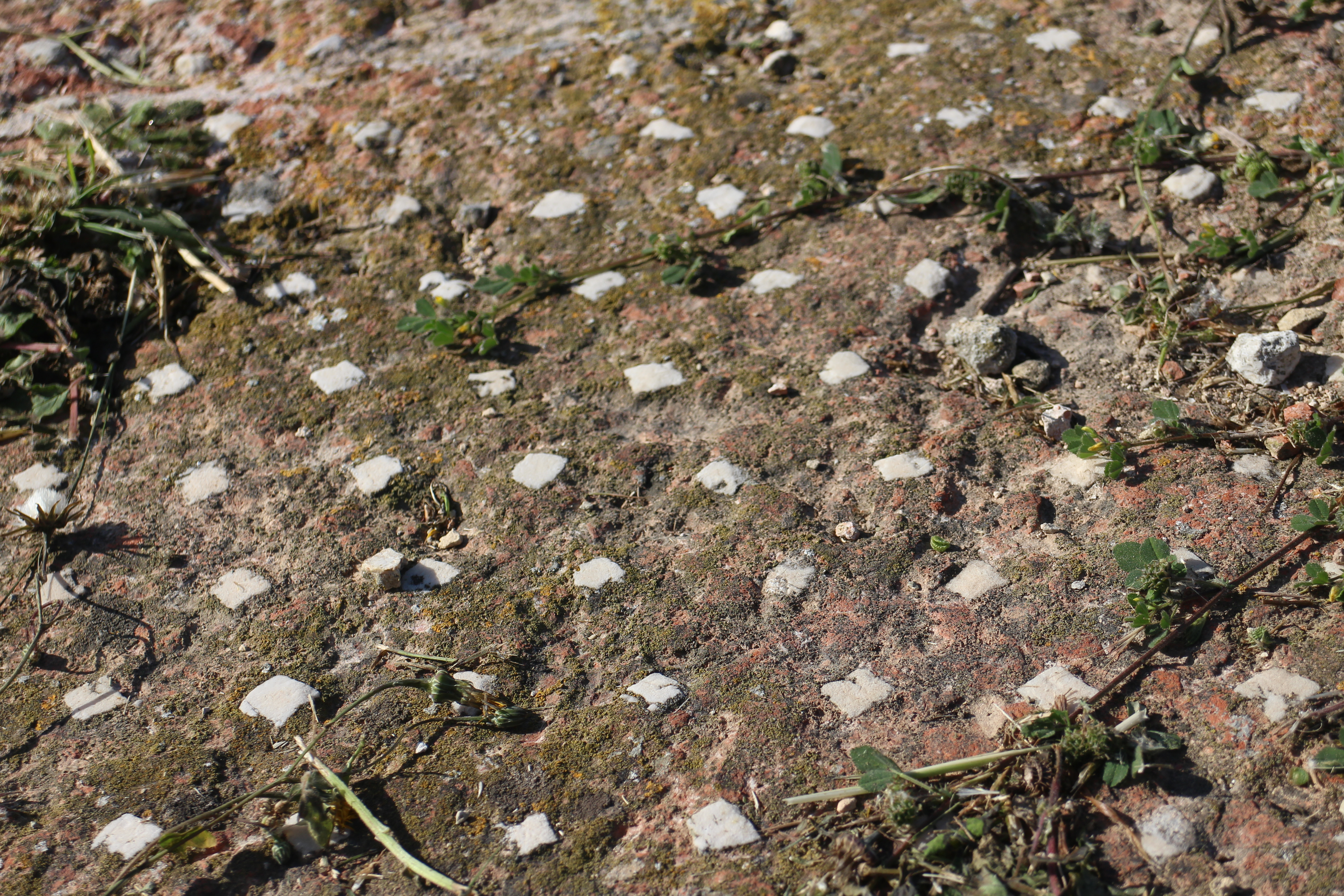
Opus signinum with white marble cubes at Tas-Silġ.

Large water storage areas under Tas-Silġ were recently found and mapped, and they probably date to the Punic or Roman eras.

==== Ancient Egyptian influences ====
During the 1969 excavations, many stone reliefs and objects with Egyptian influences were found on site, including sculptures of lotus flowers representing the Egyptian goddess Hathor and the sun god. Within the sanctuary remains, an ornament with palm volutes measuring around 7.6 cm and dating to the sixth or seventh century BC was also uncovered. Other limestone fragments, theorised to belong to some architectural design, were also found in the same area. Other similar elements were found in the Roman house at Rabat, and they are theorised to have formed part of a thymiaterion, due to their Egyptian funerary design.

=== Byzantine church ===
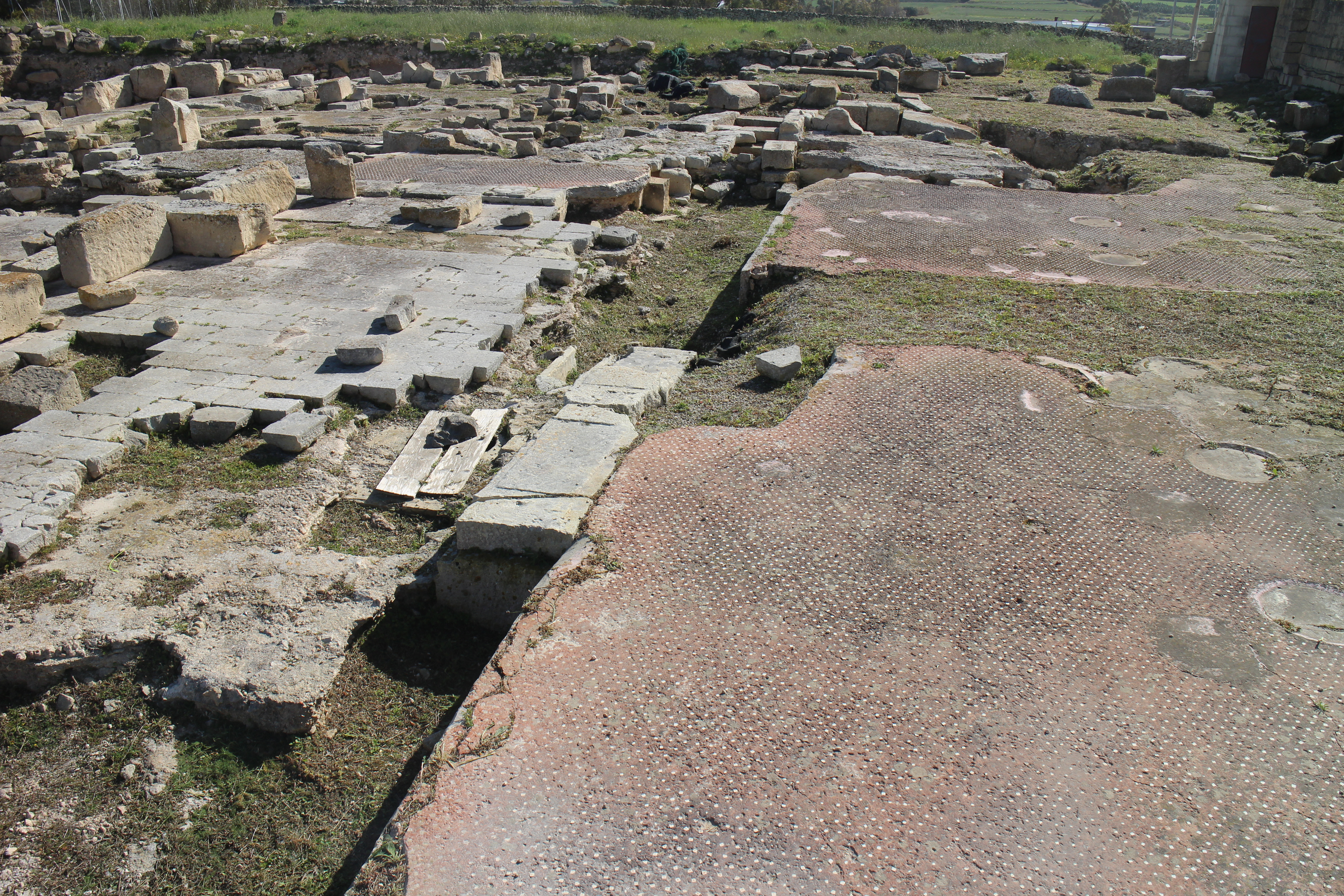
Remains of the Byzantine basilica at Tas-Silġ.

During the Byzantine era, the temple was converted into a Christian basilica. The basilica was built in the porticoed courtyard of the temple, which was roofed over. The square building had three naves with an apse at the eastern end. The prehistoric megalithic temple was reused as a baptistery, with the font placed in the middle of the ancient structure. The church, or at least its structure, remained in use until the eighth or ninth century. A fortified wall with at least one tower was built around part of the site, possibly as a response to the Arab threat. More than two hundred Byzantine coins were found in the drain of the baptismal font, dating from the mid-fourth century, the reforms by Justinian (538–539) and a gold coin dated to Constantine IV. The basilica at Tas-Silġ was expanded, modified and reutilised to include a fortified settlement linked with Marsaxlokk harbour below. Ceramic remains from Tas-Silġ span from the sixth to the ninth century, evidence that the harbour and settlement had links over centuries with various parts of the Mediterranean.

Some remains of sculpture were found, including a worn female marble head and an ivory capital with a hanging palmette. Pottery from this period was also found, including amphorae and locally made plates and other items. During the Byzantine period, it may be that the fat lady was deliberately defaced and buried in a hollow. In the 8th century, defensive walls were hastily built around the church. The church was abandoned soon after the Arabs occupied Malta in 870 AD. The site was turned into a quarry and stones from the original structure were removed. In the medieval period farms were built on the area, and rubble walls from this era still exist. The whole site was buried under a metre of soil before being excavated.

There are claims that a mosque stood on site but not enough archeological proof is found to support this. It is proven, however, that the Christian building was burned down during the Arab period.

=== Early Modern history ===
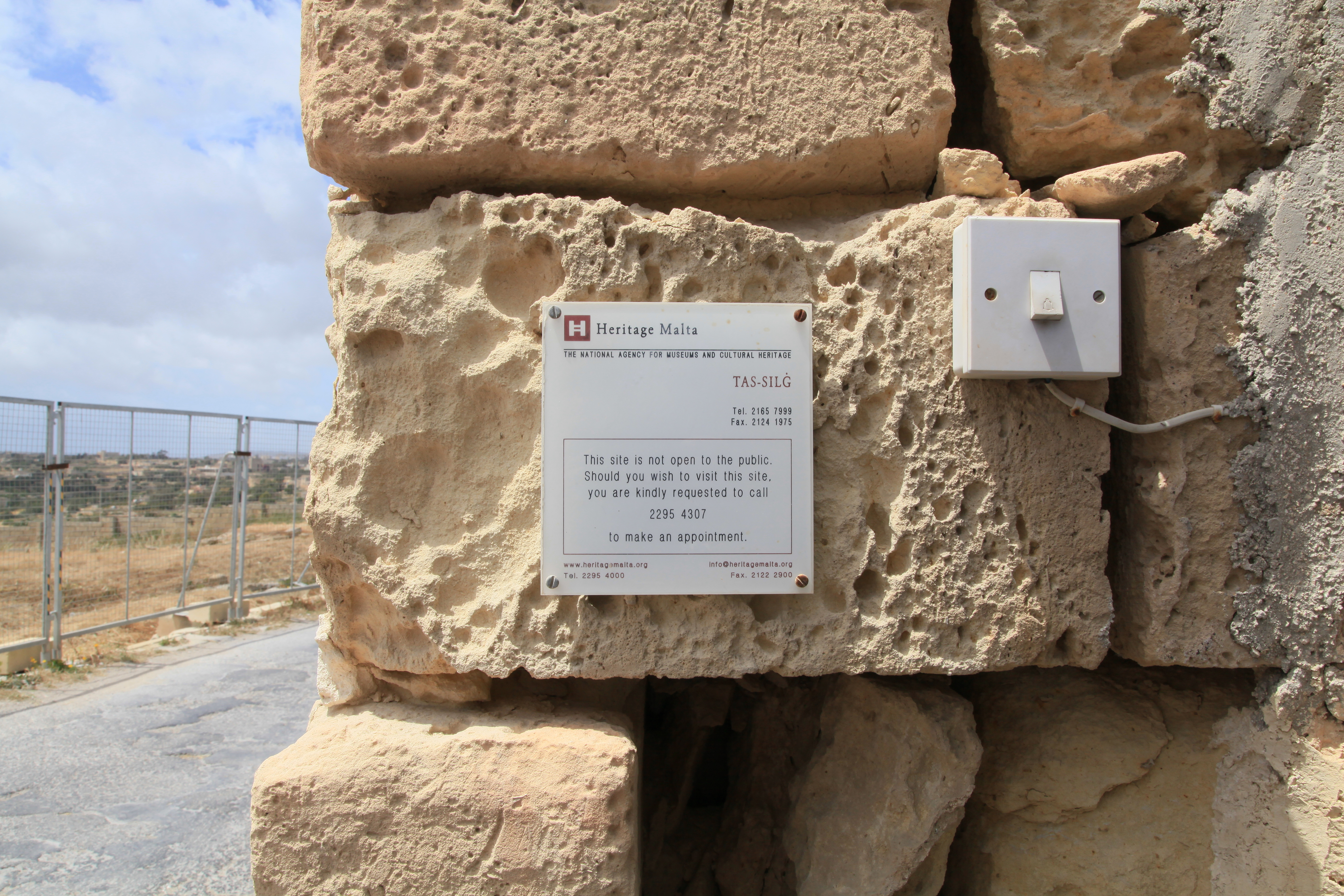
Tas-Silġ may only be visited by prior appointment.

In the seventeenth century writers began to speculate the location of Juno's temple that was referred to in ancient texts, however the site was only discovered in the twentieth century. It was included on the Antiquities List of 1925.

A remain of a column from the temple at Tas-Silġ, built in the Phoenician period, is today found at the seventeenth century Palazzo Marnisi in Marsaxlokk. Donna Angelina rebuilt the chapel nearby, referred to in Latin as Madonna ad Nives, in 1832.

New findings were discovered when Heritage Malta and the Ministry for Culture began a new project to restore and transform the ruins of a nineteenth-century farmhouse to serve as a small visitors' centre. The removal of the farmhouse's floors uncovered further important archaeological remains, including a succession of floors and walls, which mostly linked with extensions built in the Republican period. The new discoveries also identified a number of spoliation trenches. These were dug in modern times to exploit the building material of the ancient temple.

== Archaeological remains ==
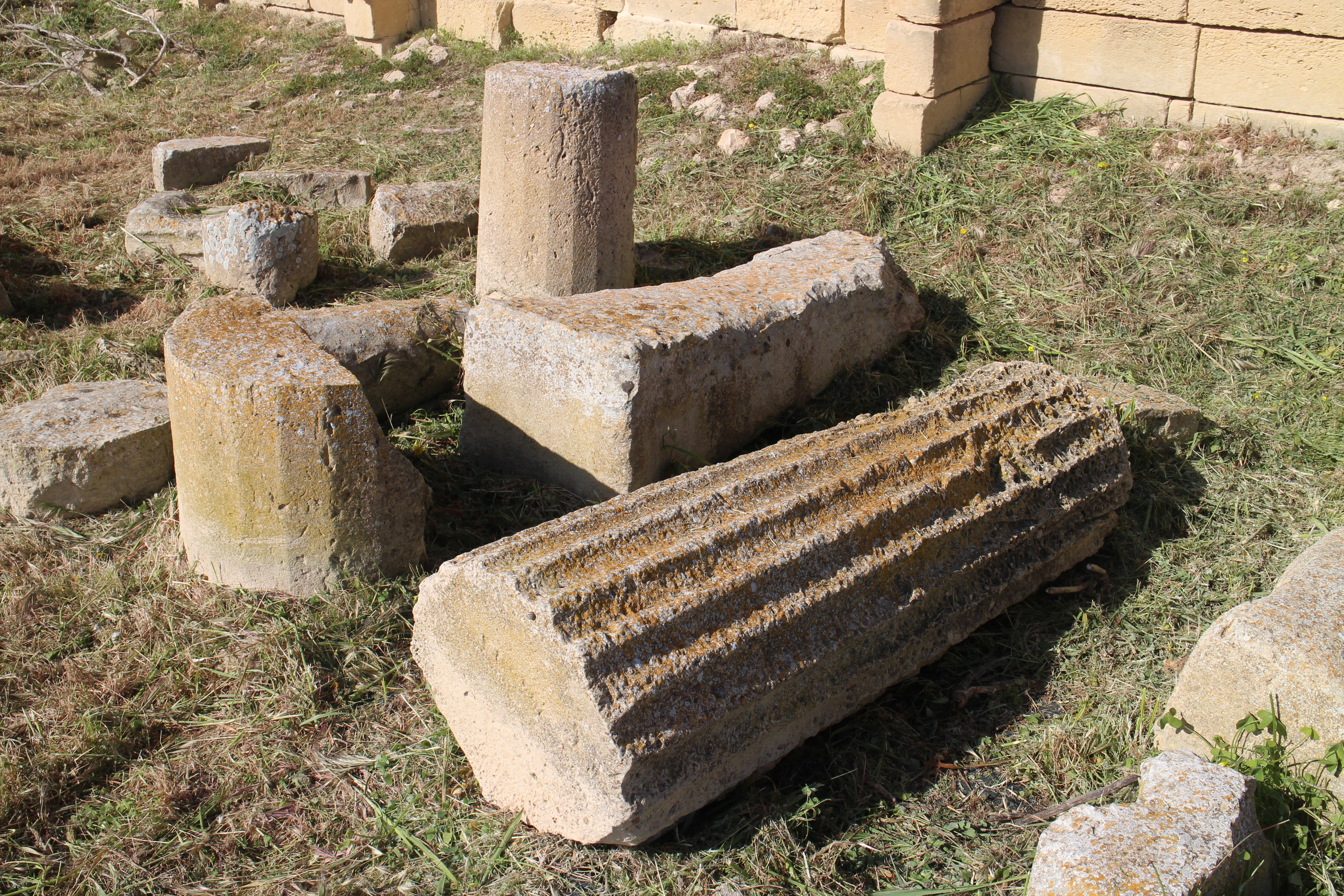
Fluted column remains at Tas-Silġ.

An Italian Mission led the first excavations between 1963 and 1972 and identified the sanctuary. From 1996 to 2005 the University of Malta and an Italian team started another excavation project to clean other layers of sediments. The site is shielded by a cover to protect it from further erosion.

Heritage Malta runs the conservation of Tas-Silġ; although the site is closed to the public, it may be visited by groups on appointment. Efforts to conserve the site are ongoing, with curators hoping that the road bisecting the site in two will someday be re-routed.
