= Maħsel Battery =

- Batterija tal-Maħsel
- Marsaskala, Malta

Site information
- Type: Artillery battery

Location
- Coordinates: 35°51′19.1″N 14°33′58.2″E

Site history
- Built: 1714–1716
- Built by: Order of Saint John
- Materials: Limestone
- Fate: Demolished

The Maħsel Battery (Maltese: Batterija tal-Maħsel) was an artillery battery in Marsaskala, Malta. It was built by the Order of Saint John in 1714–1716 as one of a series of coastal fortifications around the coasts of the Maltese Islands. The battery no longer exists.

== History ==
Maħsel Battery was built in 1714–1716 as part of the first building programme of coastal batteries in Malta. It defended St. Thomas' Bay along with Riħama Battery on the opposite side of the bay, and Saint Thomas Tower and Battery commanding the headland to the north of the bay.

Maħsel Battery's design was similar to that of Riħama Battery, having a pentagonal gun platform and a blockhouse. It was sometimes erroneously considered a redoubt, but it was actually a battery as it had a cannon.

In 1761, an entrenchment wall was built close to Maħsel Battery, part of which still survives. The battery itself no longer exists.
