= Marsaxlokk =

Marsaxlokk Ix-Xatt, Porto Ercole
- Local council
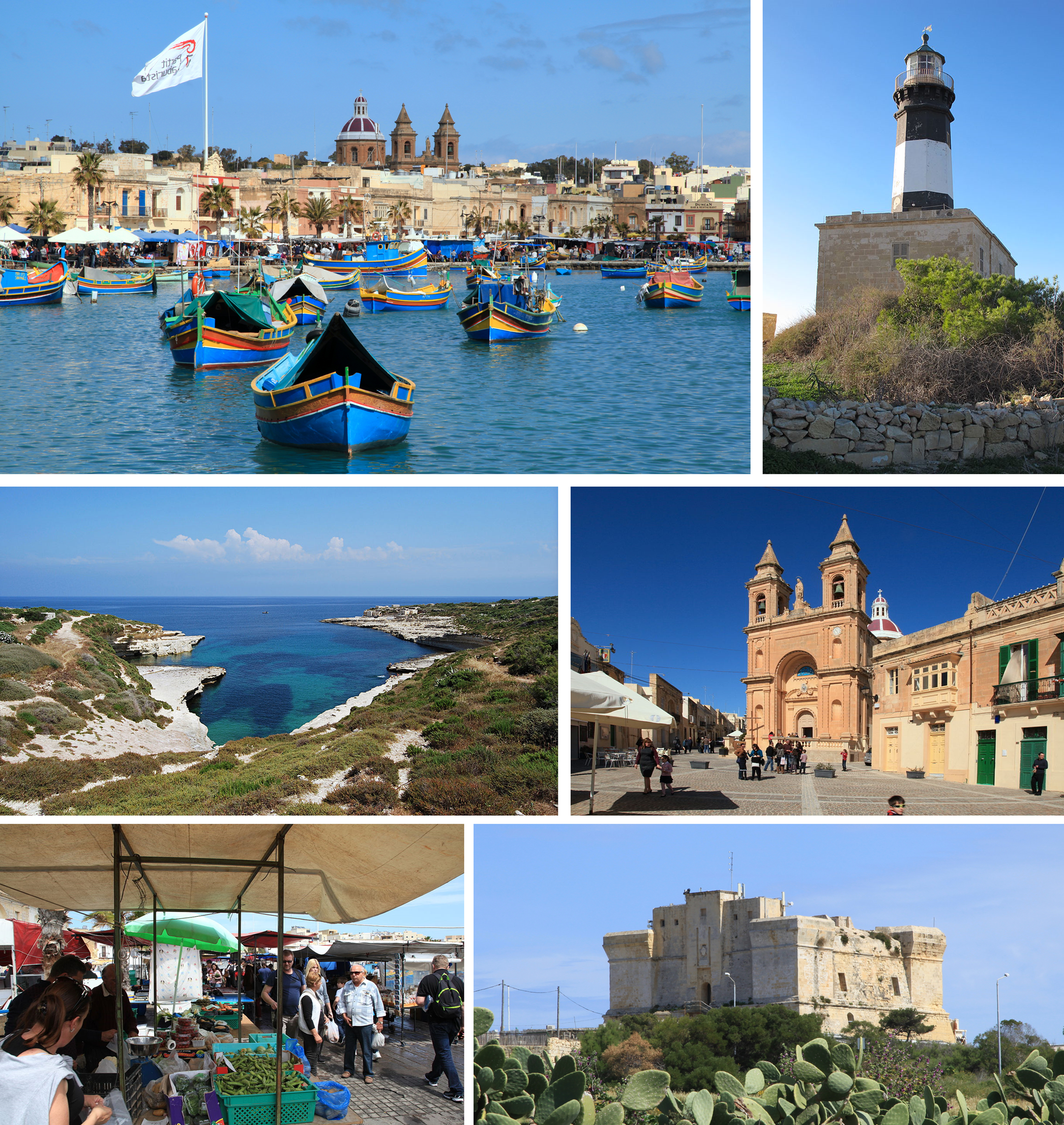
- From top: Harbour, Delimara Lighthouse, Delimara coastline, Parish Church, street market, Fort San Lucian

- Flag Coat of arms
- Motto: Portus Herculis
- Coordinates: 35°50′30″N 14°32′41″E
- Country: Malta
- Region: Southern Region
- District: South Eastern District
- Borders: Birżebbuġa, Għaxaq, Marsaskala, Żejtun

Government
  - Mayor: Steven Grech (PL)

Area
  - Total: 4.7 km^{2} (1.8 sq mi)

Population (Jul. 2024)
  - Total: 4,206
  - Density: 890/km^{2} (2,300/sq mi)
- Demonym(s): Xlukkajr (m), Xlukkajra (f), Xlukkajri (pl)
- Time zone: UTC+1 (CET)
  - Summer (DST): UTC+2 (CEST)
- Postal code: MXK
- Dialing code: 356
- ISO 3166 code: MT-28
- Patron saint: Our Lady of Pompeii
- Day of festa: 5th Sunday in July or 1st Sunday in August
- Website: en.marsaxlokklc.com

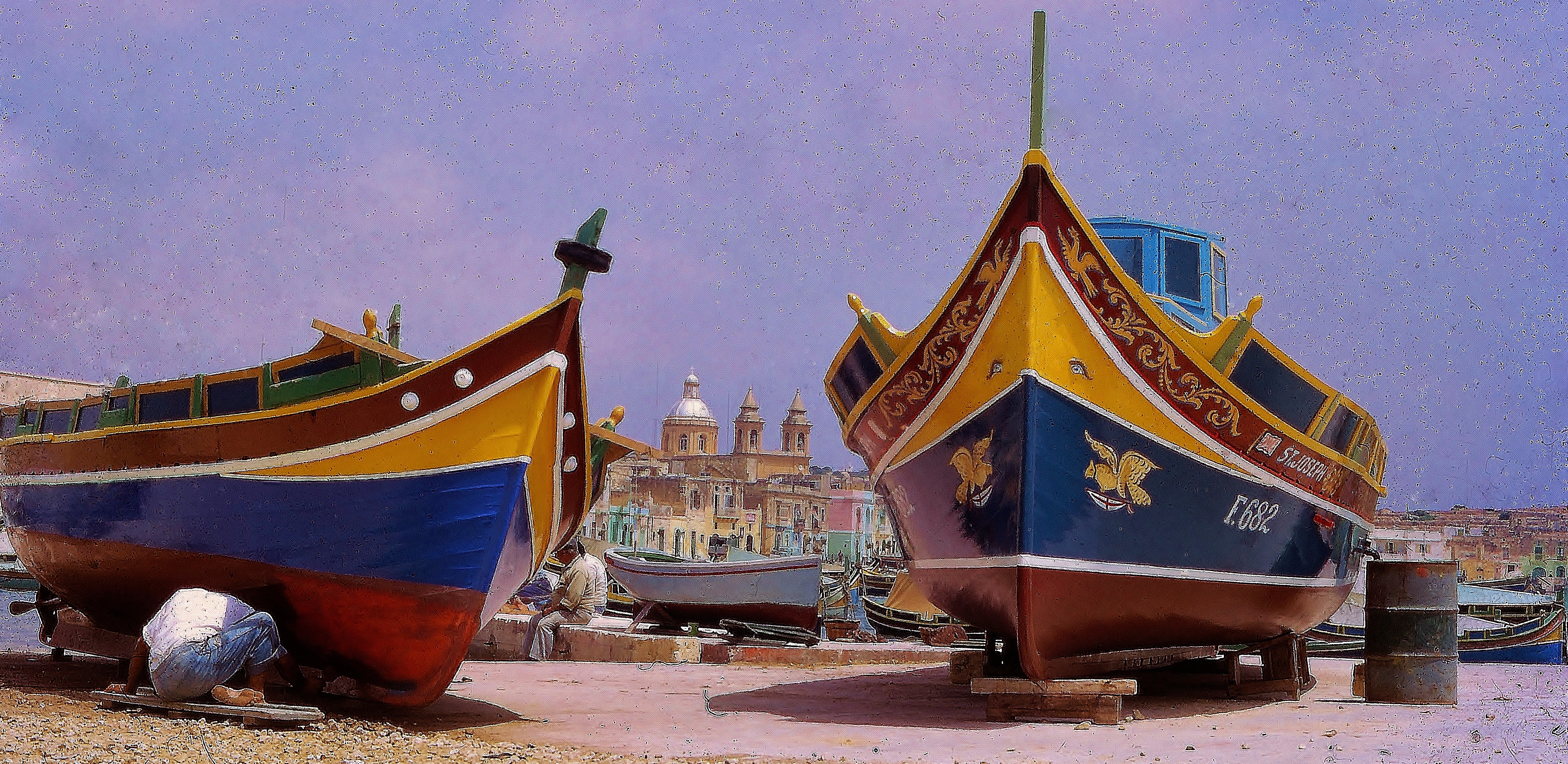
The colourful traditional Maltese fishing boats, the luzzu, one of the symbols of Malta. The painted eye on each side of the prow is an old custom believed to protect the boats from evil. Marsaxlokk is especially known for the many luzzus in its harbour. In the background can be seen the parish church of Marsaxlokk dedicated to Our Lady of the Rosary - The Madonna of Pompeii.

Marsaxlokk (Maltese pronunciation: [mɐrsɐʃˈlɔk]) is a small, traditional fishing village in the Southern Region of Malta. It has a harbour, and is a tourist attraction known for its views, fishing and history. The village is also known for the Marsaxlokk Market, which is mainly a large fish market which takes place along the seafront on Sundays, and a tourist market during all other days of the week. Inhabited and well-known since antiquity, Marsaxlokk was used as a port by Phoenicians, Carthaginians and also has the remains of a Roman-era harbour. Originally a part of the city of Żejtun, the fishing village became a separate parish in the late nineteenth century.

The population of Marsaxlokk was 4,206 in July 2024. This included 2,263 males and 1,943 females; 3,512 Maltese nationals and 694 foreign nationals.

Traditional luzzi and other larger and more modern vessels line the sheltered inner harbour. The village is also popular among locals and tourists alike for its walks around the coast and harbour, its restaurants, as well as for its swimming zones. Marsaxlokk Bay also includes a container freeport towards Birżebbuġa, a power station complex towards Delimara, and a small ship-repair facility for fishermen.

Marsaxlokk is sometimes referred to as Portus Herculis, due to the association of Marsaxlokk Bay with the Roman and Punic remains at Tas-Silġ.

== Etymology ==
The name Marsaxlokk comes from the Arabic word marsa, which means port and xlokk, which is the Maltese word for south-east. The word is related to the name for the dry sirocco wind that blows from the Sahara, comparable to the equivalent Catalan word, xaloc. The inhabitants of the village are called the Xlukkajri and are, traditionally, fishermen by trade.

== Topography ==
Situated in the south-east end of the main island of Malta, Marsaxlokk bay is fed by a valley that drains the Marnisi and Ħal Ġinwi areas. The Marsaxlokk floodplain is one of the smaller ones on Malta. Today, a small marsh survives at the head of the bay, named Tal-Magħluq. This may indicate that the bay may have been larger in the past and gradually silted up since antiquity. Although there are no sources from the medieval and early modern period to prove the existence of marshes in the area, a marshy environment survives at the head of the fishing harbour.

Sediment deposition over recent century has silted the bay, making it significantly more shallow than in antiquity. Researchers hypothesize that vessels of all sizes could once have sought shelter here. A sandy beach, Għar Aħmar, was opened in 2019 following sand renourishment. A freshwater supply exists in the valley that lies between two of the three hills dominating the bay - namely to the north-east, north and north-west. Access to plains around Żejtun would have been easy via this same valley, with a meandering road linking the bay to the Żejtun Roman Villa. While the bay could only have been used as a temporary anchorage without human intervention, a simple sea wall may have enabled the harbour to be used as an all-weather anchorage. In antiquity, its main function would have been to serve the agricultural sites in the surrounding areas. It may also have enjoyed links with the Tas-Silġ sanctuary overlooking the bay.

== History ==
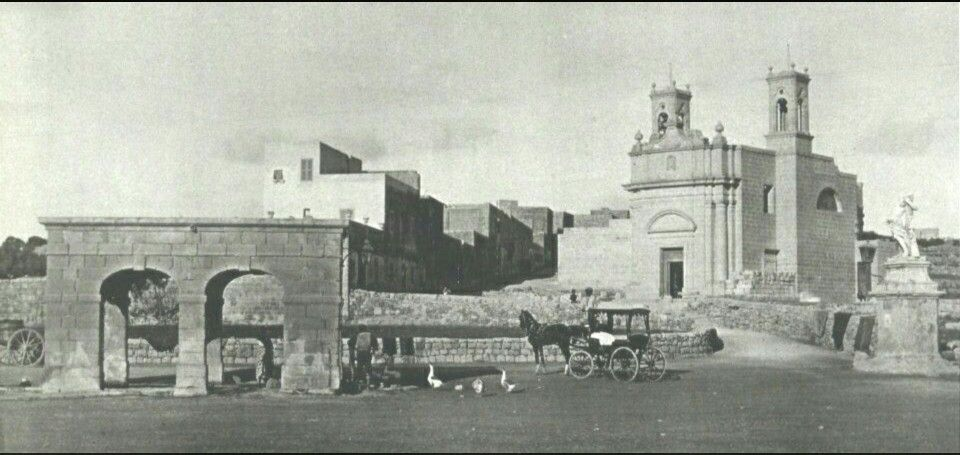
Marsaxlokk in 1883

To the north-east of the village, on the rounded hilltop of Tas-Silġ, there is a multi-period sanctuary site covering all eras from the Neolithic to the fourth century AD. The Tas-Silġ site includes megalithic remains, scattered edifices belonging to three distinct temples. Cicero describes the temple of Juno in Malta in his In Verrem. The temple, long associated with the remains at Tas-Silġ, contained "a large number of ornaments among which was a carefully and supremely crafted ancient ivory statue of Victory." The presence of such ornaments is a clear indication of the importance of this temple not just locally but also on a Mediterranean scale. Recent studies of the ceramics from Tas-Silġ led to conclusions that the sanctuary was used as a centre of exchange for both local and imported goods. The remains atop the hill also include a more recent Byzantine basilica and monastery.

Little is known about the area during the Middle Ages, with all the casalia of the south-eastern side of the island being exposed to frequent raids and attacks by Saracen pirates and, later, raiders from the Barbary coast. Modern historical studies and topology confirm that the area between Żejtun and Marsaxlokk was covered in vegetation and pasture land. In the later Middle Ages, Marsaxlokk was included in medieval portolani. At least three of these medieval sailing instructions, dating as far back as the 13th century mention, Marsaxlokk (as marza sinocho, Marsa silocco and marza per sirocho). The Rizo portolan of 1490 gives sailing distances from Marsaxlokk to a variety of other ports in the Mediterranean including Tunis, Cephalonia and Tripoli in Libya. This reflects the port's connectivity with other parts of the medieval Mediterranean.

The invading Ottoman navy anchored at Marsaxlokk during the Great Siege of 1565, before they completed the attack on Fort Saint Elmo. The whole harbour area was systematically fortified over successive centuries, with towers, batteries and fortresses ringing Marsaxlokk bay. This chain of fortifications was intended to protect the vulnerable harbour, and included Vendôme Tower, Fort Delimara, Delimara Tower, Ta' Bettina Tower, and Fort Tas-Silġ on Delimara point, on the north arm of Marsaxlokk Bay, Fort San Lucian on Kbira point in the middle of the bay, and the Pinto and Ferretti batteries on the shores of the bay towards Birżebbuġa. The most prominent fortification of this chain, Fort San Lucian was built by 1611 and may have prevented a landing in the bay by Ottoman forces in 1614. Napoleon's navy entered Marsaxlokk, and landed an army on the coast during the French invasion of 1798. During the Maltese uprising - British, Neapolitan and Portuguese forces operated from here. Horatio Nelson and his lover Emma Hamilton also stayed here from April to June 1800, visiting parts of the island.

Most of the fishermen who worked out of Marsaxlokk bay hailed from Żejtun, commuting back and forth from the shore. Around 1846, the first houses began to be built in Marsaxlokk, as fishermen from Żejtun settled there permanently. At the end of the nineteenth century, a church was built to minister to the spiritual needs of the fishermen and their families. Eventually, the fishing village of Marsaxlokk was separated from Żejtun and became a distinct parish in January 1897. The construction of the parish church started in 1890. It was built as a fulfillment of a promise made by Marquess Rosalia Apap Viani Testaferrata after she was saved from a violent storm at sea. The church was originally built in a rectangular form with the designs attributed to Dun Ġużepp Diacono. Marsaxlokk became an independent parish in 1897. The feast of our lady is held on the last Sunday of July. It includes a procession with the statue and a firework display.

In the 1930s, Marsaxlokk bay was used as a staging post by four-engined Short C-Class flying boats of Britain's Imperial Airways as they pioneered long-distance air travel to across the British Empire. During the Second World War, Marsaxlokk Bay was the base for the Fleet Air Arm with a base at Kalafrana. In 1989, the famous summit meeting between Soviet and US leaders Mikhail Gorbachev and George H. W. Bush was held on board a ship anchored in the bay. Today, the village is framed by the fuel tanks and chimneys of the 537.8-megawatt Delimara Power Station, and the huge cranes of the Malta Freeport Container Terminal.

In recent years, Marsaxlokk has also developed as a modern seaside resort. The village includes a natural park at Xrobb l-Għaġin.

== Cultural tradition ==
Marsaxlokk is also famous for the national boats which are the luzzu and the kajjik. They serve the fisherman on fishing near the shore and for fishing away from the shore they use another type of boat. Tourists also can take boat trips from Marsaxlokk to Delimara and Birzebbuġa.

Most of Malta's fish supplies are caught by fishermen coming from this port as about 70% of the Maltese fishing fleet is based there. Swordfish, tuna, and 'lampuki' are caught in abundance between spring and late autumn. On weekdays, the catch is taken to the fish-market in Marsa, but on Sundays, fresh fish is sold by fishermen directly on the quay.

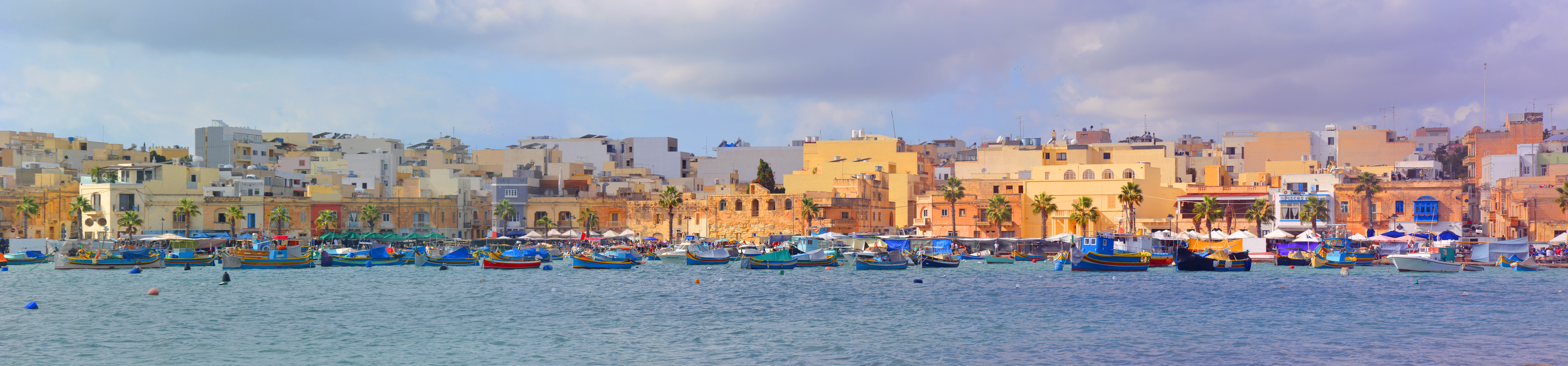
Panoramic view of the Marsaxlokk harbour

== Zones in Marsaxlokk ==
- Delimara
- Ħal Ġinwi
- Il-Ballut
- Il-Fossa
- Il-Magħluq
- Il-Wilġa
- Kavallerizza
- Marnisi
- Marsaxlokk Bay
- Il-Ponta l-Kbira
- San Duminku
- St. Peter's Pool
- Il-Ponta Tal-Qrejten
- Tal-Wiċċ
- Tas-Silġ
- Torri San Luċjan
- Xrobb l-Għaġin
- Port Ruman

== Sports ==
Marsaxlokk F.C., formed in 1949, is the village's main football team. It plays in the Maltese Premier League, with home games taking place at the Ta' Qali Stadium. Marsaxlokk also has a water polo team, which dates to 1952.

== Twin towns – sister cities ==
Marsaxlokk is twinned with:

- Cadeo, Italy
- Leucate, France

== See also ==
- St Paul's Tower and Chapel (Malta)
