= St Thomas' Bay =

Bay in Malta

- Il-Bajja ta' San Tumas
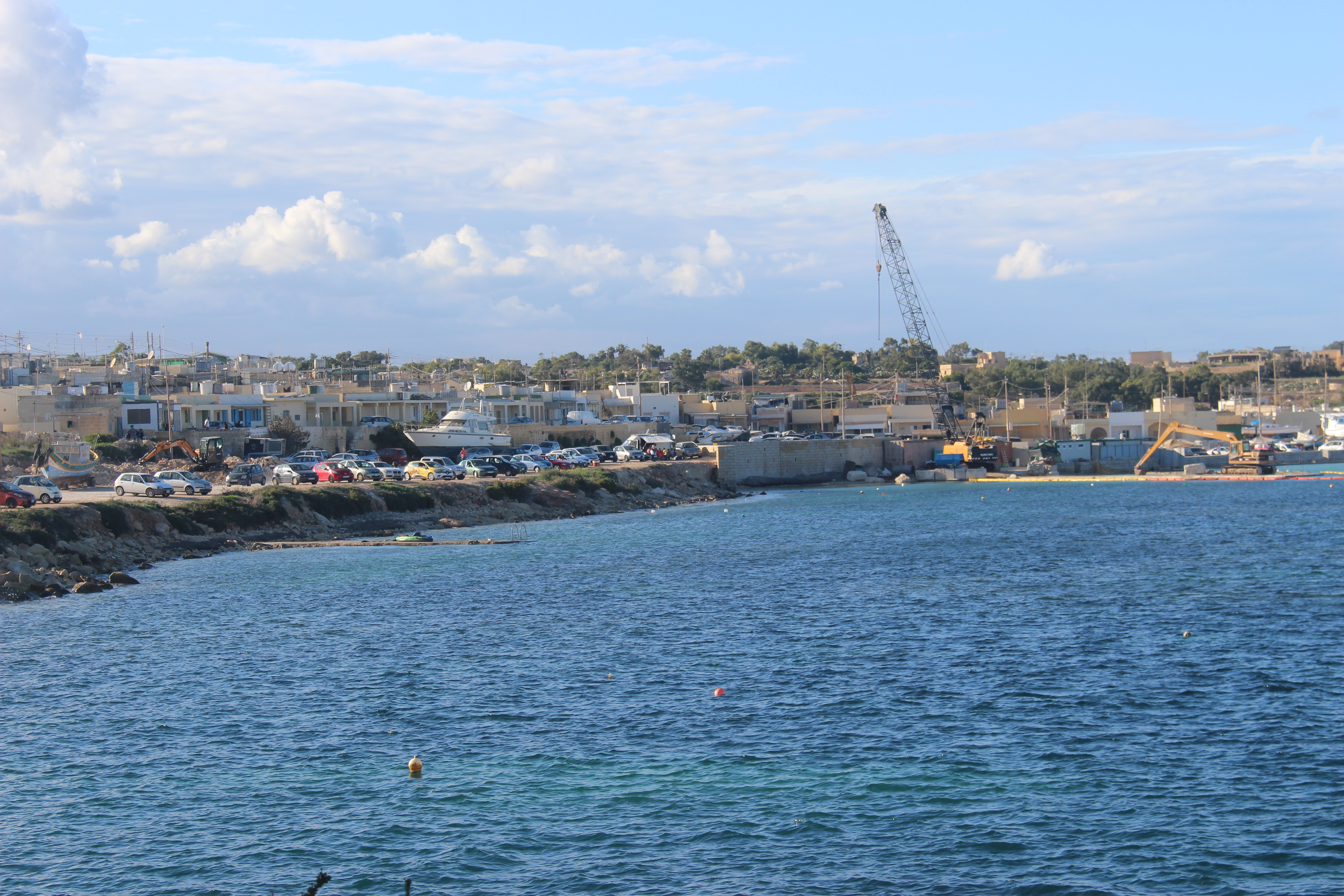
- The bay as seen from the Munxar Headland

- Location within Malta
- Location: Malta
- Coordinates: 35°51′09″N 14°33′57″E
- Etymology: Saint Thomas the Apostle
- Max. length: 0.54 kilometres (1,800 ft)
- Max. width: 0.44 kilometres (1,400 ft)
- Surface area: 0.29 square kilometres (72 acres)
- Shore length^{1}: 2.17 kilometres (7,100 ft)
- ^{1} Shore length is not a well-defined measure.

St Thomas' Bay (Maltese: Id-daħla ta' San Tumas) is a bay in southeastern Malta, located in the limits of the seaside town of Marsascala.

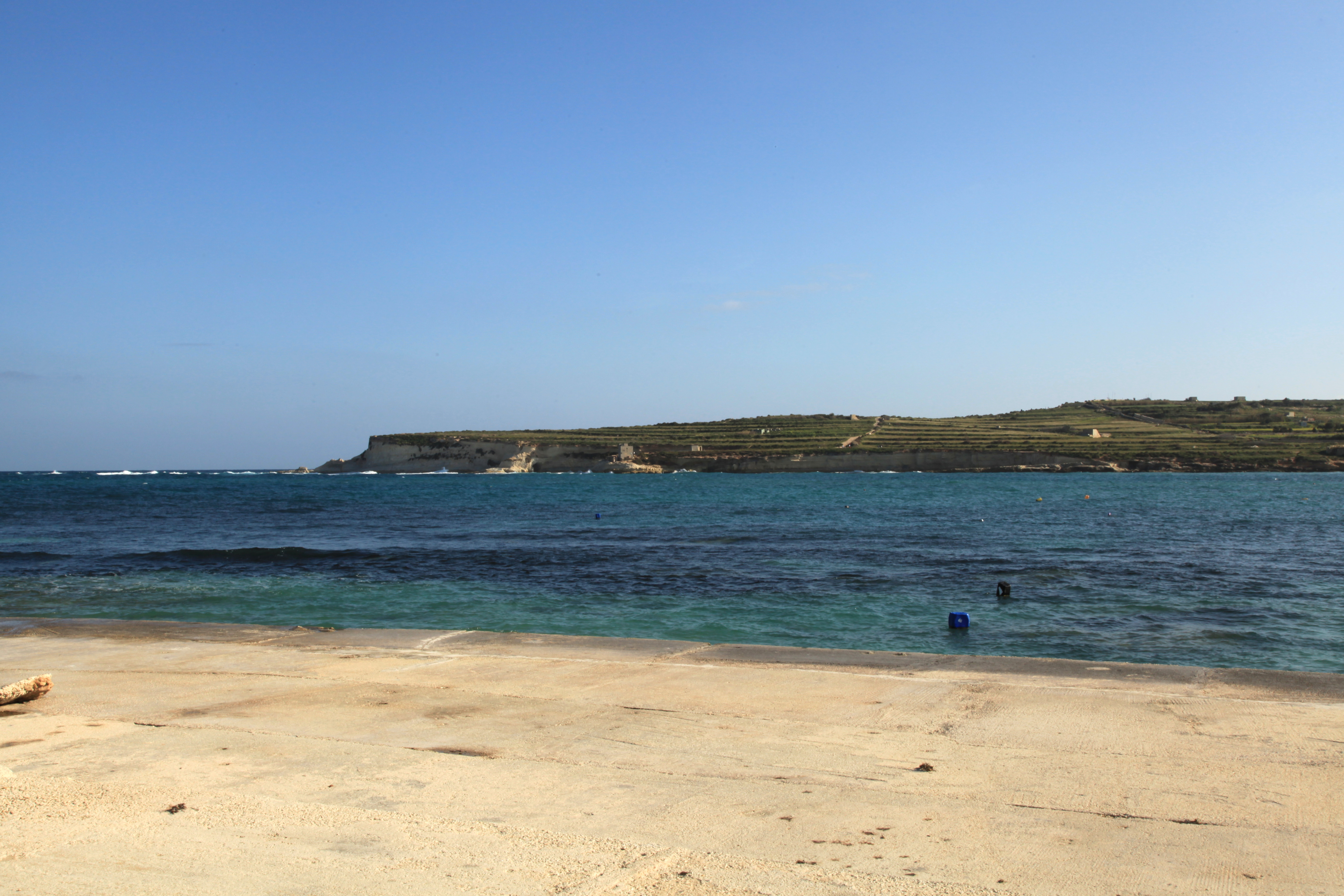
St Thomas' Bay, with Munxar headland in the background.

== About ==
The bay takes its name from an ancient medieval chapel dedicated to St Thomas the Apostle. The exact location of the chapel cannot be ascertained, however, its location is linked to a shrine to St Thomas on the main road to Żejtun. Historically, the bay formed part of the nearby town of Żejtun, which lies immediately uphill of the inlet. The bay and Munxar point are popular with residents of Żejtun and other inland villages for swimming, hunting and bird-trapping.

Some historians contend that St Thomas' Bay marks the true landfall of Paul the Apostle following his shipwreck on Malta. This theory is based on both geography, as well as archaeological findings of ancient Roman anchors in the bay. St Thomas' Bay includes a number of fortifications, including the Grade 1 scheduled Riħama Battery at its southern end. A large fortress, St Thomas tower was built at the tip of Il-Gżira ta' Wied il-Għajn in 1614 after an Ottoman fleet anchored in the bay and raided Żejtun.

The town of Marsascala developed on the northern shores of the bay, while the headland of Il-Munxar forms the southern edge of the bay. The bay contains a number of smaller inlets, some with sand, while the bay also serves as a harbour for a number of small boats. In its inner creek, there are a number of boathouses.

== Munxar headland ==
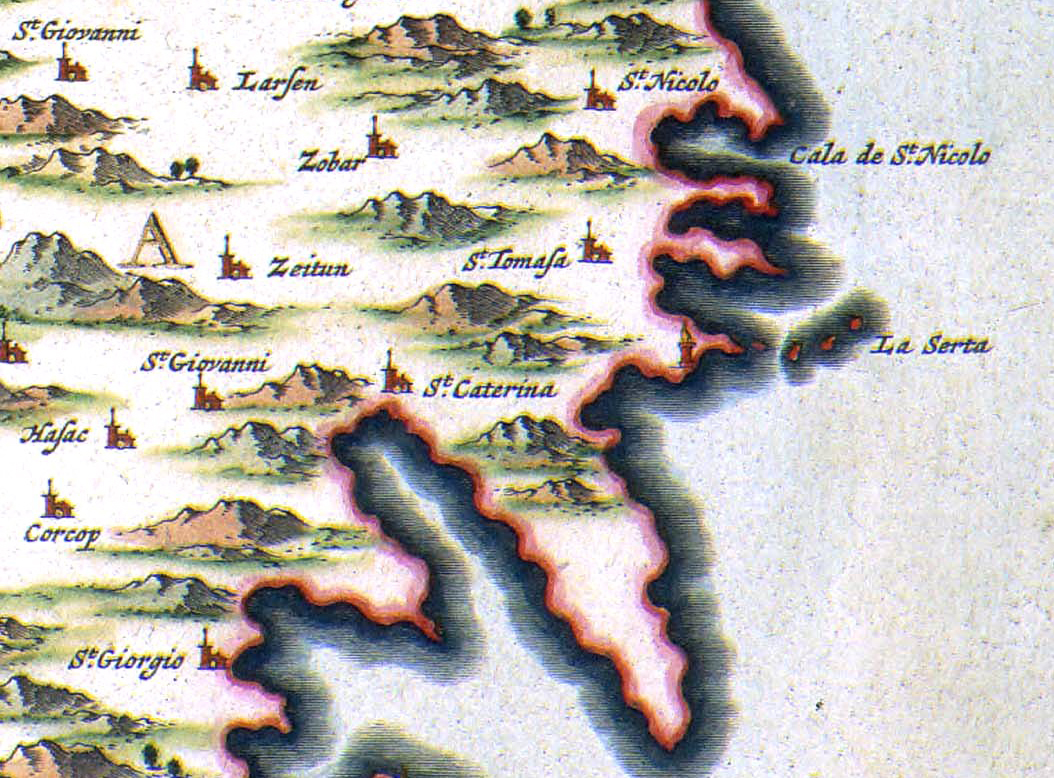
In this 1681 map, the name La Serta is used to describe the stacks and reefs at the tip of Munxar Bay.

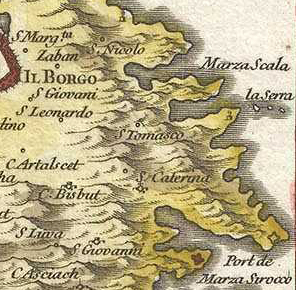
In this 1748 map, the group of stacks are called La Serra, the Italian word for a saw, a tool which in Maltese is called munxar.

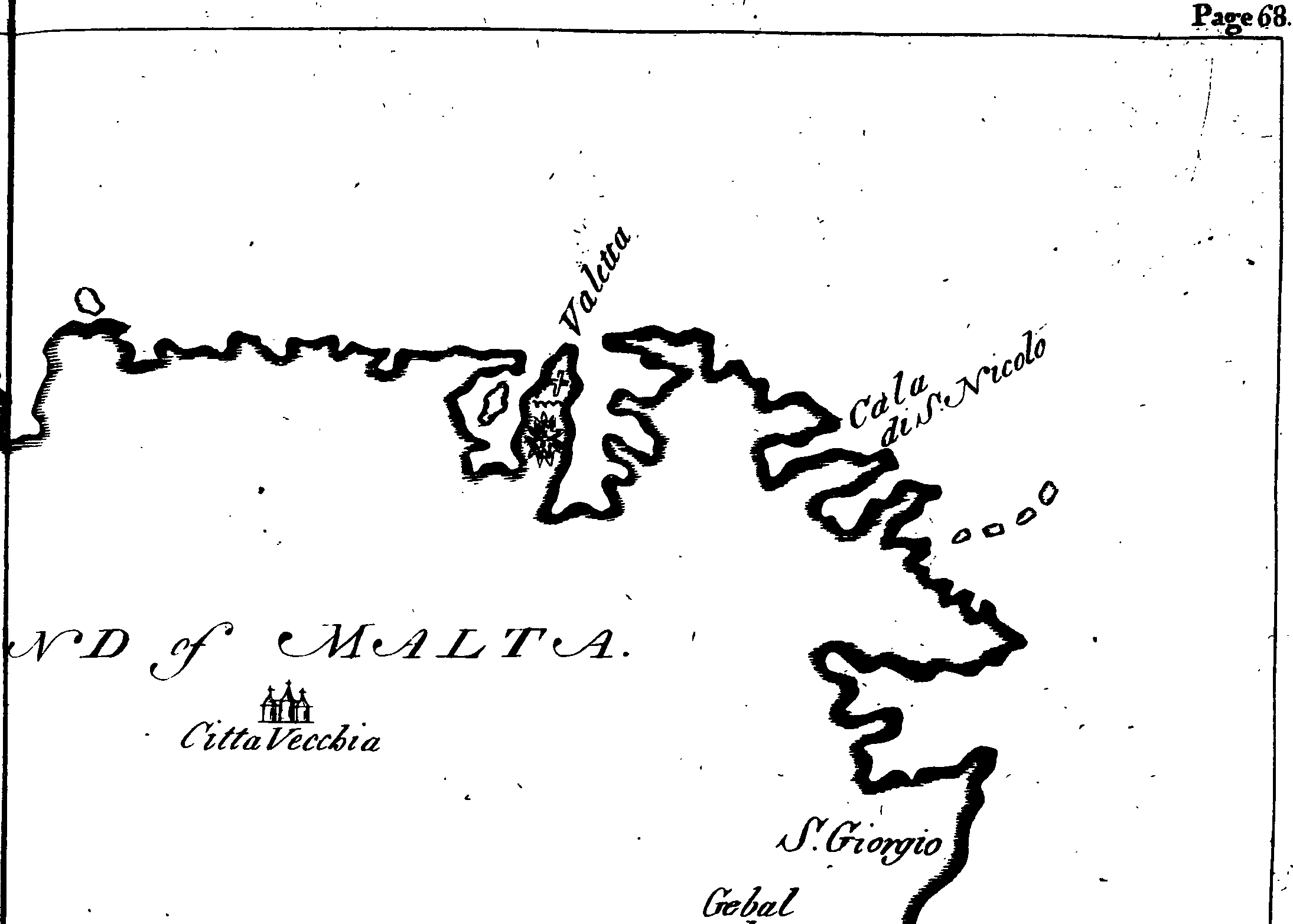
Four sea stacks can be seen in this 1767 map by John Brekell, in his book Euroclydon: or the dangers of the sea considered and improved, in some reflections upon St. Paul's voyage and shipwreck.

Munxar headland (Maltese: Ras il-Munxar)^{[A]} is a rock-bound peninsula on the southern edge of the bay. The headland takes its name from a number of stacks, long since eroded into submerged reefs, which used to extend into the Mediterranean sea from Munxar point. The old Italian placename for the stacks jutting out of the headland was La Serta (English: The Wreath). In other maps, the group of stacks is called La Serra, that is, 'the saw.' The Maltese word for saw is 'Munxar.' The headland is an unspoiled part of the Delimara peninsula, facing St. Thomas' Bay. It has a number of terraced fields, and commands good views of the bay from its heights. The fields are typical Maltese agricultural land, consisting of small plots. The soil depth is less than two feet on average, containing mainly silty-sandy soil. The plots are terraced on levels with rubble walls. As Munxar lacks water supply, the site is only viable to be cultivated by winter crops like fodder. Part of the promontory forms part of a designated national park, and the headland is a scheduled Area of High Landscape Value. Munxar headland is close to the recorded megalithic remains at Xrobb l-Għaġin, and includes a number of fortifications, including Saint Paul's Tower and Chapel.

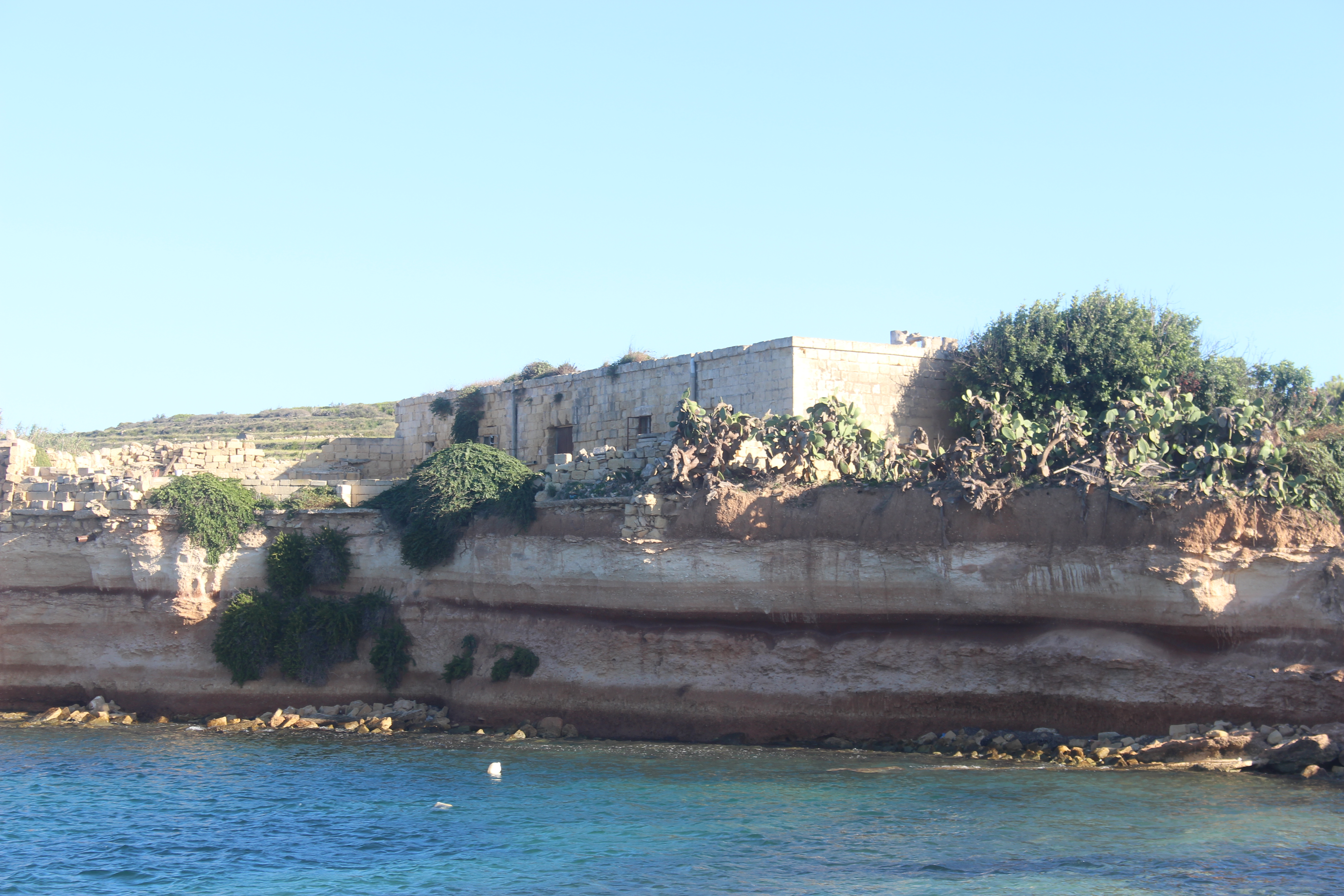
An abandoned gun battery used during the french occupation of malta.

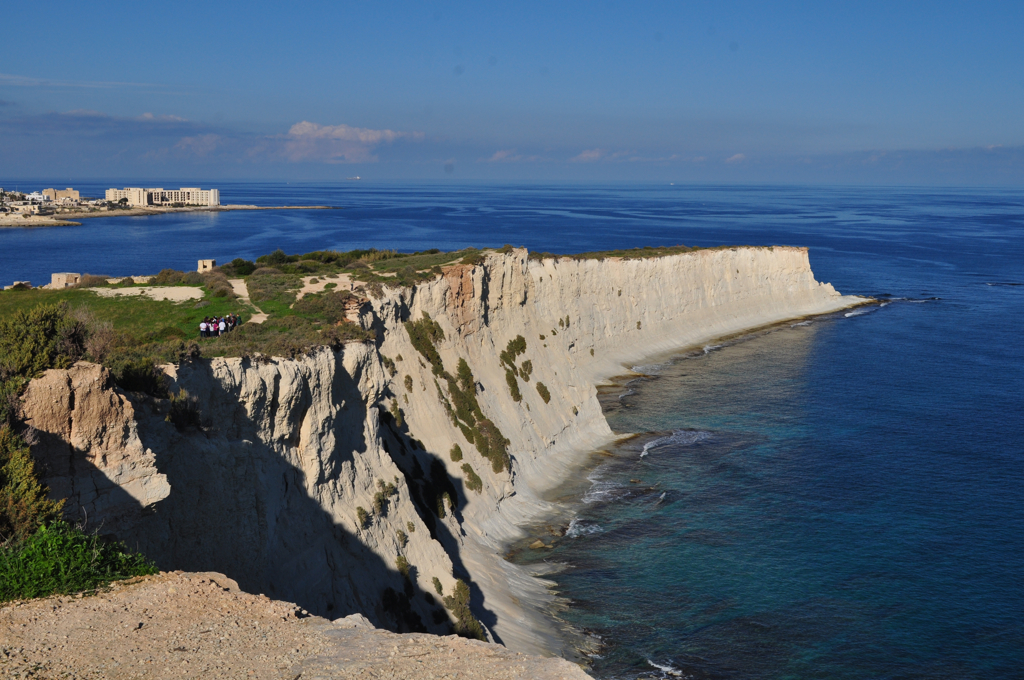
Munxar headland today. St Thomas' Bay can be seen in the background.

In 1995, the land was proposed for development into a tourist village, but the plans were successfully resisted by residents and activists of the surrounding villages, and were shelved in 1996. More recent applications were filed for an agri-tourism village and for solar farms. These were either deemed incompatible with the area or withdrawn.

== Notes ==
[A]. Munxar headland should not be confused with a village in Gozo with the same name.
