= Our Lady of Pompeii Roman Catholic Church, Yoogali =

Our Lady of Pompeii Roman Catholic Church
- Our Lady of the Holy Rosary of Pompeii; St Mary's Church
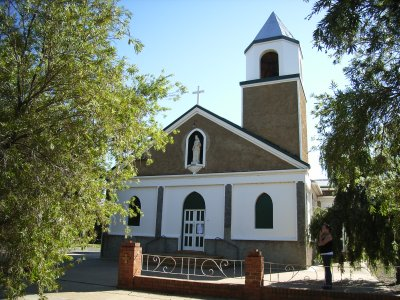
- Our Lady of the Holy Rosary of Pompeii Roman Catholic Church, n.d.

- Location in New South Wales
- 34°17′58″S 146°04′58″E
- Location: Edon Street, Yoogali, City of Griffith, New South Wales
- Country: Australia
- Denomination: Catholic
- Website: www.wagga.catholic.org.au/Parishes/YendaYoogaliHanwood.aspx

History
- Status: Church
- Founded: October 1939
- Founder(s): Dr. Henschke, Auxiliary Bishop of Wagga Wagga
- Dedication: Our Lady of Pompeii, the Patroness of Italians in foreign lands

Architecture
- Functional status: Active
- Architect: Antonio Ceccato
- Architectural type: Church
- Years built: 1939–1940
- Completed: 28 April 1840

Administration
- Diocese: Wagga Wagga
- Parish: Yenda – Yoogali – Hanwood

Clergy
- Priest: Rev. Peter Stojanovic

New South Wales Heritage Register
- Official name: Our Lady of Pompeii Roman Catholic Church; Our Lady of the Holy Rosary of Pompeii; St Mary's Church
- Type: State heritage (built)
- Designated: 15 December 2006
- Reference no.: 1746
- Type: Church
- Category: Religion
- Builders: Antonio Ceccato and members of the Italian community

Our Lady of Pompeii Roman Catholic Church is a heritage-listed Catholic church at Edon Street, Yoogali, City of Griffith, New South Wales, Australia. It was designed by Antonio Ceccato and built from 1939 to 1940 by Ceccato and members of the Italian community. It is also known as Our Lady of the Holy Rosary of Pompeii and St Mary's Church. It was added to the New South Wales State Heritage Register on 15 December 2006.

== History ==
The history of the Yoogali church has to be viewed against the background of the changing status of the Italian community. The 1930s saw increasing hostility towards Italian settlers in the Murrumbidgee Irrigation Area, due to their relative success in maintaining and increasing their holdings compared to Anglo-Australian farmers during the depression. At the same time, the growing Italian community was becoming increasingly self-aware and desirous of greater social and cultural expression.

The Church was dedicated to Our Lady of Pompeii who was the chosen Patroness of Italians in foreign lands.

The genesis for the construction of the church appears to have been a decision by the Catholic Church hierarchy to provide an Italian speaking priest – Father Sylvester Bongiorno – to the Griffith parish in the late 1930s. Apart from the occasional visits by Italian missionary priests, there had been no opportunity for the Italian community to worship in their own language and culture. The Sacred Heart Church in Griffith has been established in 1928 with minimal Italian involvement and did not offer Italian mass until 1971.

The community instigators for building the church were Paul Zanotto and Romano Snaidero, who approached other members of the local Italian Catholic community. The community enthusiastically agreed to raise the money and build the church themselves despite the impoverished times of the Depression years. This was unique for the time and is thought to be the first church in Australia to be built by and for the Italian community. The building was designed and constructed by local builder, Anotonio Ceccato. His was the only design tendered which proposed that the church be constructed of bricks and cement blocks. The designs were drawn up to these specifications by the architect, G. W. A. Welsh, and signed by Antonio Ceccato, Father Bongiorno and Pompeo Vardanega.

The foundation stone of the new church was laid by Dr. Henschke, Auxiliary Bishop of Wagga Wagga in October 1939. Construction was completed in 6 months by volunteer labour with materials also donated by the Italian community. Gladys Burrell (wife of Dr A. E. W. Burrell), a devoted supporter of the church and presumably treasurer of the committee, came out regularly to Yoogali with a bag of money from the funds raised and made progressive payments to the builder, Antonio Ceccato, who then paid his workmen. The church was opened on 28 April 1940. The Italian Consul-General Sr. Mammalella, attended the opening celebrations which took the whole day and included mass, formal speeches, confirmation and baptism ceremonies. A crowd of many hundreds participated in the celebrations. A dinner was attended by a large number of both Italo and Anglo-Australians.

A social club – the genesis of the present day "Catholic Club" – operated from makeshift premises beside the church to the west during the 1940s. This included a bocce court and corrugated iron clubroom. A school was established in the extension to the rear of the church c. 1949, later moved to new buildings across the road. In 1953, a hall in Art Deco style was constructed adjacent to the church to the east.

The church continues in use by the local Italian community.

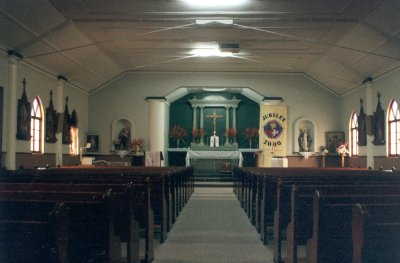
Interior with altar

== Description ==
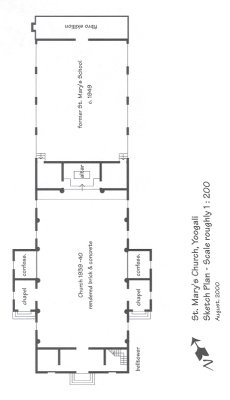
Sketch plan

Our Lady of Pompeii Roman Catholic Church is a church with a meeting room attached to the rear, a bell tower to the south-east corner of the street facade, and two side chapels.

The walls are rubble-filled brick cavity construction rendered externally and internally. The bell tower is of mixed off-form concrete and brick construction. The timber-framed roof structure is clad with corrugated iron. Windows are Gothic-arched with a simple pattern of coloured and textured glass. A statue of the Madonna is set into the street facade.

The two side chapels were added shortly after the main construction. A schoolroom was added to the rear at an unknown date (c. 1949). Both additions are in matching style and are not intrusive. In the 1950s the statue of the Madonna was added to the front, post the church's construction, replacing a circular rose window. Internally the choir balcony is a later addition of unknown date. The altar, Stations of the Cross, and pews have all been progressively acquired. Original furnishings were primitive and have not survived.

The church was reported to be in fair to good condition as at 5 July 2005. The building suffers from rising damp which is causing damage to rendered walls.

The church has a high degree of integrity.

== Heritage listing ==
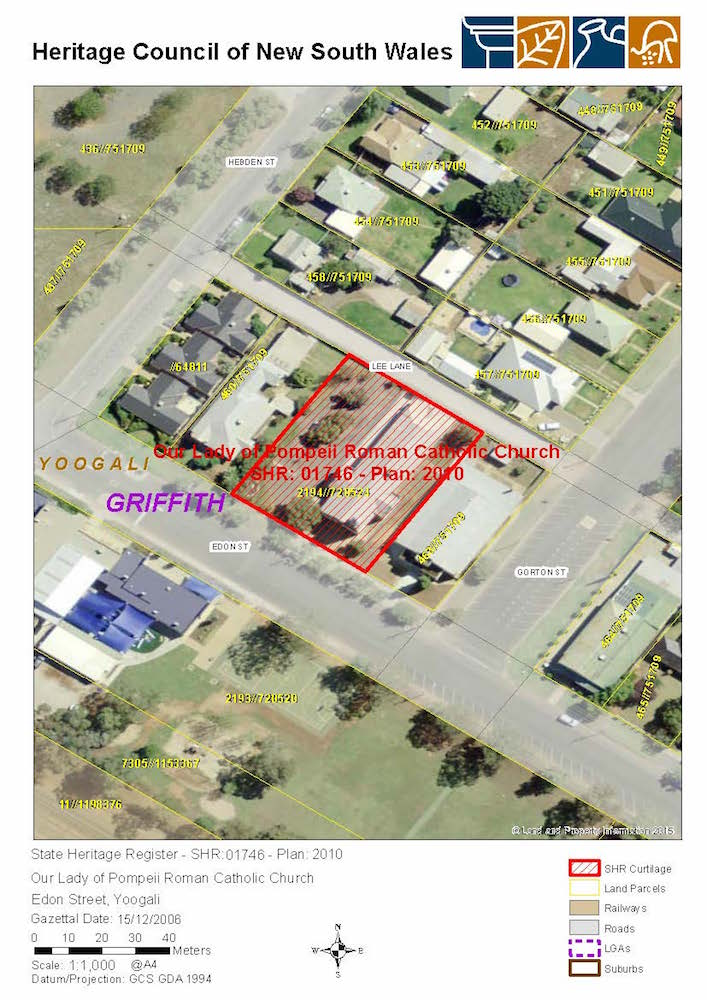
Heritage boundaries

Dating from 1939 to 1940, Our Lady of Pompeii Roman Catholic Church is historically significant as possibly the oldest church constructed by, and for the sole use of an Italian community which is still in use in New South Wales. Construction of such churches by small, impoverished ethnic communities appears uncommon in Australia.

The Church is aesthetically distinctive as an example of vernacular church design of the Veneto region, transplanted in memory to the Australian setting. Both the design and construction reflect these Italian origins and are strikingly different to traditional Australian Catholic church architecture. The unusual construction techniques which reflect both Italian practices and the amateur skills of the local volunteer construction force are also of technical significance.

Originally dedicated to and named after the chosen Patroness of Italians in foreign lands, the church continues to have a strong connection and value to the now established Italian community. The community value it not only for spiritual reasons, but as a social gathering point for a dispersed population. The church played a seminal role in the development of self-esteem by this community at a difficult period in inter-ethnic relations during the late 1930s, and represents the establishment and growing cultural expression of the Italian community in Australia during this period, which contributed to the development of a multi-cultural Australia.

Our Lady of Pompeii Roman Catholic Church was listed on the New South Wales State Heritage Register on 15 December 2006 having satisfied the following criteria.

The place is important in demonstrating the course, or pattern, of cultural or natural history in New South Wales.

Dating from 1939 to 1940, the church is state significant as almost certainly the oldest church in New South Wales constructed by, and for the sole use of, an Italian community which is still in use.

The construction of the Church in the style of the Italian homeland for and by the Italian migrant community provides early evidence of the growing confidence and establishment of the Italian culture in Australia, as a concrete expression of the Italian community desire for greater social and cultural expression at this time.

The place is important in demonstrating aesthetic characteristics and/or a high degree of creative or technical achievement in New South Wales.

The church is aesthetically distinctive as an example of vernacular church design of the Veneto region, transplanted in memory to the Australian setting. Both the design and construction reflect these Italian origins and are strikingly different from traditional Australian church architecture.

The place has strong or special association with a particular community or cultural group in New South Wales for social, cultural or spiritual reasons.

The church is significant through its ongoing association with the Griffith Italian community who value it not only for spiritual reasons, but as a social gathering point for a dispersed population. As such the building is representative of the typical role of churches, however, this particular church played a seminal role in the development of self-esteem by this community at a difficult period in inter-ethnic relations during the late 1930s.

The special status of the church for the Italian immigrants was recognised from the time of its opening, which as well as attracting widespread interest and participation in the celebrations by the community and its wide coverage in the religious and lay press, was attended by the Italian Consul General.

The place has potential to yield information that will contribute to an understanding of the cultural or natural history of New South Wales.

The church is of technical interest due to the construction techniques which differ markedly from usual Australian church construction and reflect both Italian practices and the amateur skills of the volunteer construction force.

The place possesses uncommon, rare or endangered aspects of the cultural or natural history of New South Wales.

The Church is rare in New South Wales as almost certainly the oldest operating church constructed by and for the sole use of an Italian community. Construction of such churches by small impoverished ethnic communities appears uncommon in Australia.

The place is important in demonstrating the principal characteristics of a class of cultural or natural places/environments in New South Wales.

The Church represents a distinctive example of the Italian vernacular church design, transplanted by memory into Australia by Italian migrants.

== See also ==
- List of Roman Catholic churches in New South Wales
