= Parish Church of Our Lady of Pompei, Marsaxlokk =

Parish Church of Our Lady of Pompei
- Knisja tal-Madonna ta' Pompei
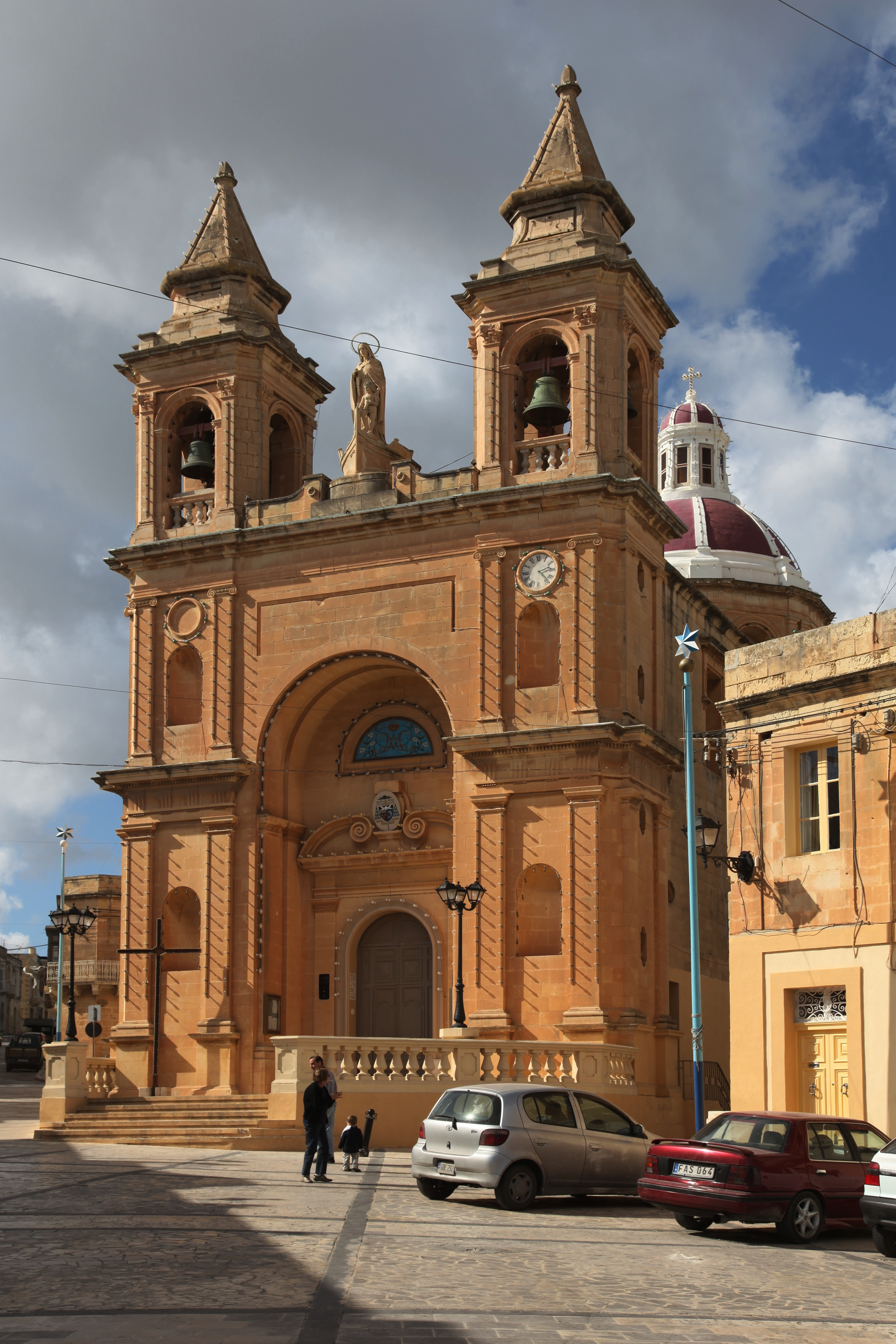
- The church in 2010
- Parish Church of Our Lady of Pompei
- 35°50′30.0″N 14°32′40.4″E
- Location: Marsaxlokk, Malta
- Denomination: Roman Catholic
- Website: marsaxlokkparish.com

History
- Status: Active
- Founded: 1890
- Dedication: Our Lady of Pompei
- Consecrated: 17 September 1967

Architecture
- Functional status: Church
- Architectural type: Church
- Style: Baroque architecture

Administration
- Archdiocese: Malta

Clergy
- Priest: Fr. Luke Seguna

The Church of Our Lady of Pompei is a Roman Catholic parish church located in the fishing village of Marsaxlokk in Malta.

== history ==
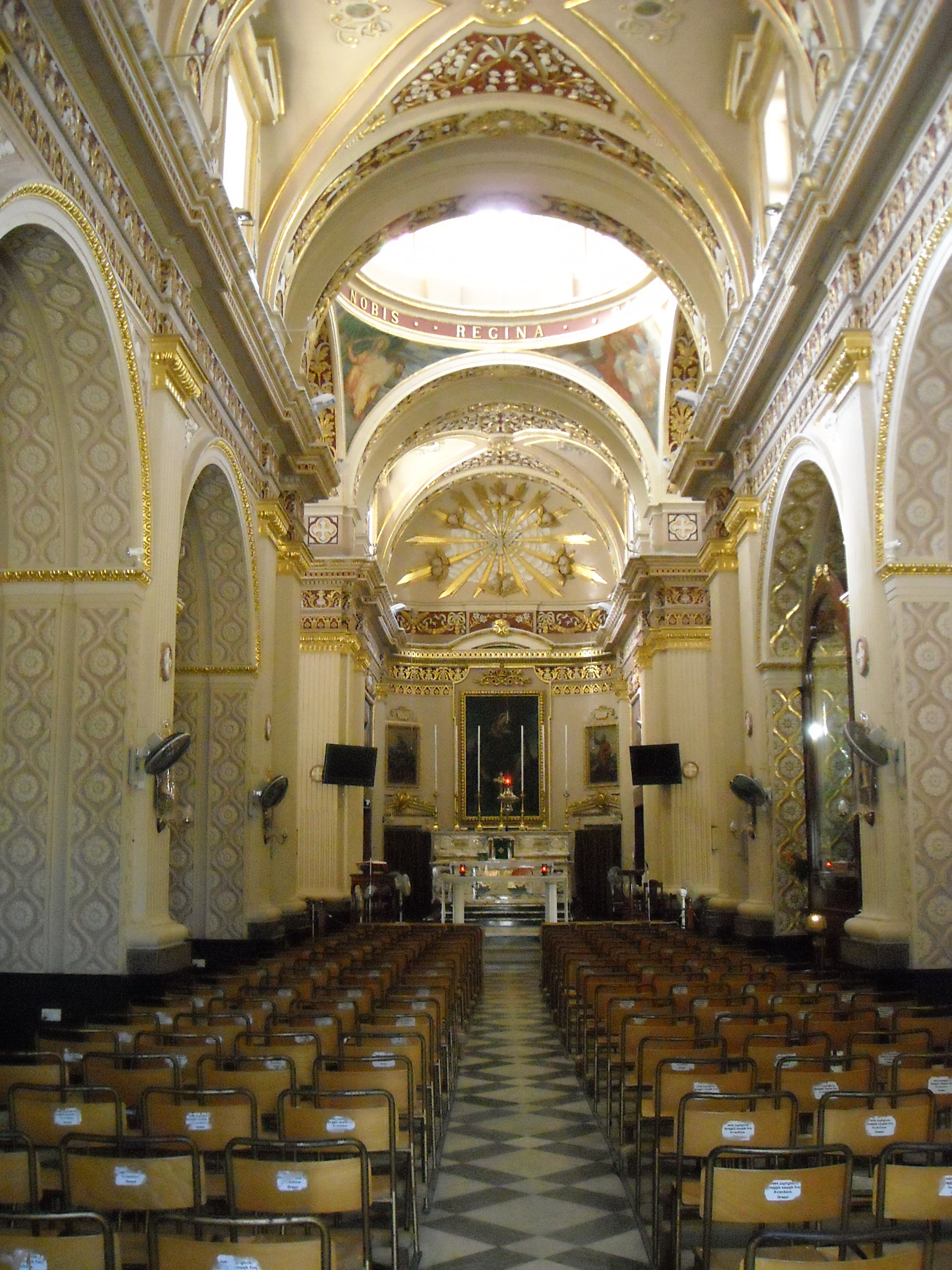
Interior of the church

The parish of Marsaxlokk was established when fishermen started to build houses near the sea coast in order to save time on travelling. Thus at the end of the 19th century it was decided to build a church that would minister to the spiritual needs of the fishermen and their families. Prior to becoming a parish, Marsaxlokk was part of the parish of Żejtun. The construction of the church started in 1890. It was built as a fulfilment of a promise made by Marquess Rosalia Apap Viani Testaferrata after she was saved from a violent storm at sea. The church was originally built in a rectangular form with the designs attributed to Dun Ġużepp Diacono. Marsaxlokk became an independent parish in 1897. The first parish priest was Reverend Salv Delia. In the 1900s the church was enlarged altering the shape to that of a Latin cross with the addition of east end transepts and a choir. In the late 1920s a new west front was constructed under the direction of architect Giuseppe Lia.

The church is listed on the National Inventory of the Cultural Property of the Maltese Islands.

== Works of art ==
In 1899 a statue representing the Virgin Mary with baby Jesus presenting a rosary to Saint Dominic and Saint Catherine of Siena was presented to the church. It was made in Lecce, Italy under the supervision of Guzeppe Malicore. The church also has a number of paintings by Giuseppe Calì.

== See also ==
- Culture of Malta
- History of Malta
- List of Churches in Malta
- Religion in Malta
