= Saint Paul's Tower and Chapel =

Watch tower in Malta

St Paul's Tower and Chapel
- Torri u Batterija ta' San Pawl
- Marsaxlokk, Malta
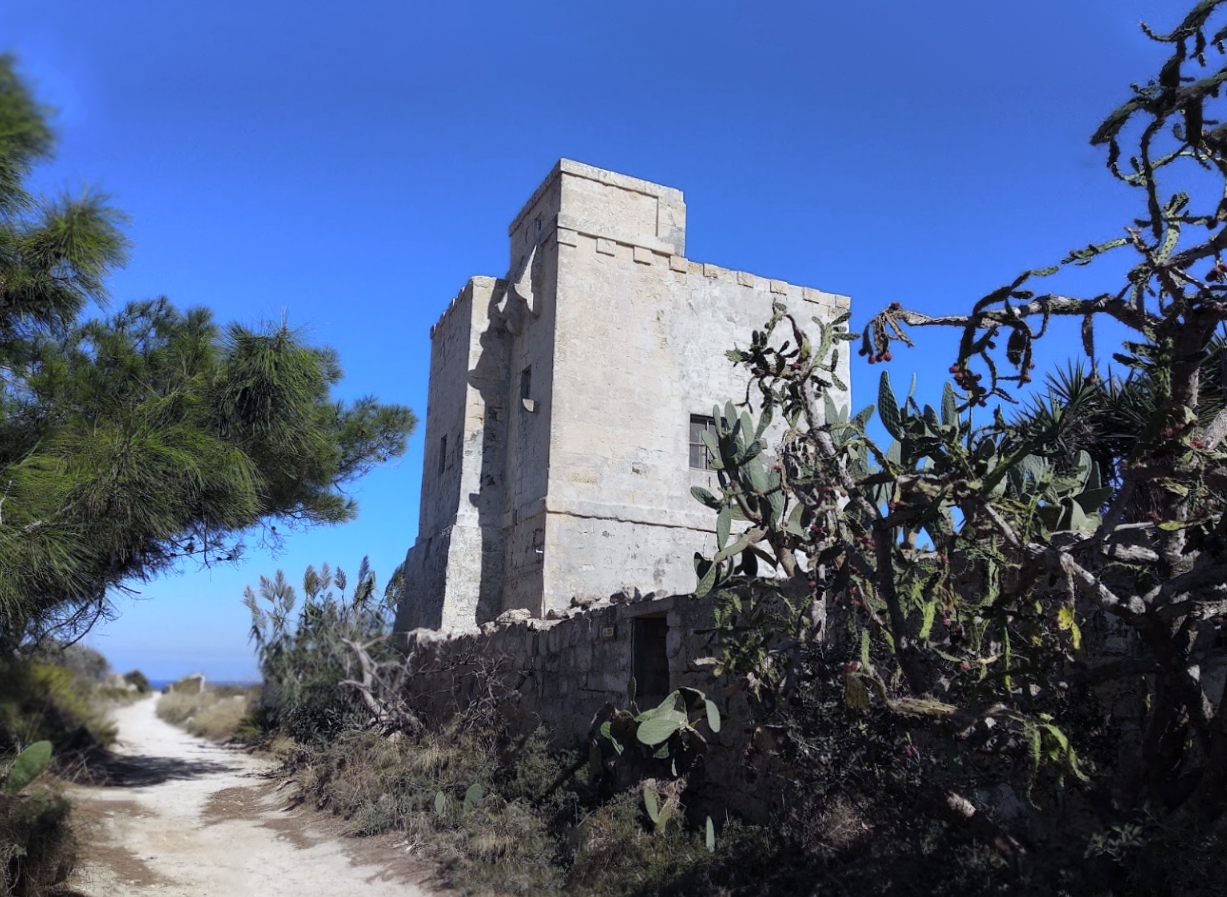
- Torri ta' San Pawl, also known as Ta' Bettina

Site information
- Type: Coastal watchtower Chapel
- Owner: Private
- Open to the public: Inaccessible

Location
- Coordinates: 35°50′38.8608″N 14°33′51.7968″E

Site history
- Built: c. 1740
- Materials: Limestone
- Fate: Intact

Saint Paul's Tower and Chapel are a defensive tower and chapel in Delimara, Marsaxlokk, Malta. The tower is also referred to as Ta' Bettina Tower and in official documents as Delimara Tower. (Note: In the 2009 Government Gazette listing the property, the tower is referred to as: "Delimara Tower (formerly listed as St Paul's Tower), Marsaxlokk.") A tower and chapel already existed in 1776, when Claudio Muscati Xiberras was granted the title Marchese di Xrob il-Għaġin.

== Tower ==
The tower consists of three rooms at ground floor level used for residential purposes. The rooms have a high ceiling and are very well kept. The living area is part of the tower and has arched ceilings with typical Maltese stone-slabs (Maltese: kileb). The two-storey, L-shaped tower has a plain external appearance, while the lower part has a slight slope. There is a plain projecting string course between the ground and first floor, while the first floor has a ‘dashed’ plain projecting cornice. The tower has small window openings and machicolations (gallarija tal-misħun) for throwing projectiles or boiling liquid onto besiegers.

St Paul's Tower was included in the Antiquities Protection List of 1932 and was classified by the authorities as a Grade 1 national monument as per Government Notice number 1082/09.

== Chapel ==
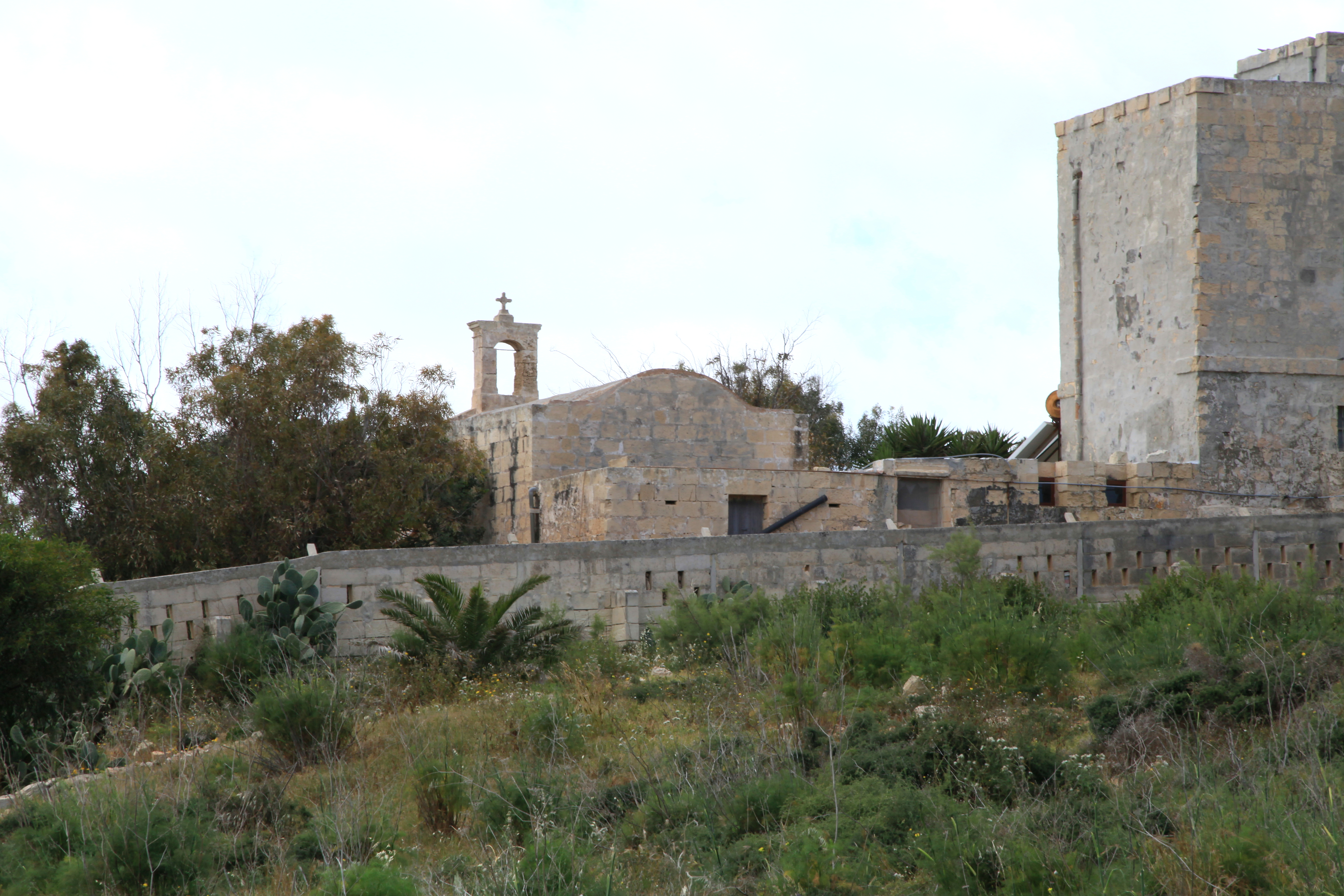
St. Paul's Shipwreck Chapel, next to the tower.

The current chapel was built in 1740 by Elisabetta Muscat Cassia Dorell, and rebuilt in 1831 by her daughter Marchioness Angelica Moscati Cassia Dorell. It was restored in 1931 by Angelo Muscat Cassia Dorell.
