= Borġ in-Nadur =

Archaeological site in Malta

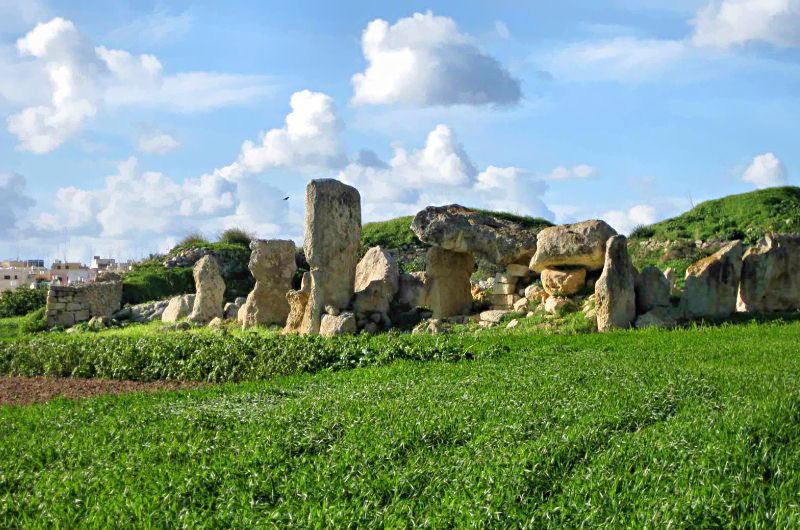
- The megalithic complex at Borġ in-Nadur

- Location within Malta
- 35°49′52.3″N 14°31′44.4″E
- Type: Temple; Fortified village
- Periods: Tarxien phase Bronze Age
- Location: Birżebbuġa, Malta
- Part of: Megalithic Temples of Malta

History
- Built: c. 2500 BC
- Abandoned: c. 500 BC

Site notes
- Material: Limestone
- Excavation dates: 18th century – 1959
- Archaeologists: Annetto Caruana; Antonio Annetto Caruana; Margaret Murray
- Condition: Ruins
- Owner: Government of Malta
- Management: Heritage Malta
- Public access: No

Borġ in-Nadur is an archaeological site located in open fields overlooking St George's Bay, near Birżebbuġa, Malta. It is occupied by a Tarxien phase megalithic temple as well as the remains of a Bronze Age village which includes the earliest fortification in Malta. The site is located close to various Bronze Age cart ruts and silos, a Roman villa at Ta' Kaċċatura, as well as Saint George Redoubt which was built thousands of years later in 1715–1716.

== Late Neolithic Complex ==
A megalithic structure was constructed in the area during the Tarxien phase of Maltese prehistory and the final phase of the Late Neolithic period. The architecture shows a typical four-apse plan, although the wall made up of megaliths is quite low. The site's entrance has two upright megaliths which can still be seen. A large covered niche stands close to the entrance but its capstone is now broken into three pieces.

The structure lacks the artistic decorations associated with similar temples from the era such as Tarxien Temples or Ħaġar Qim. A small cemetery is located about 9m away from the main temple.

== Bronze Age village ==
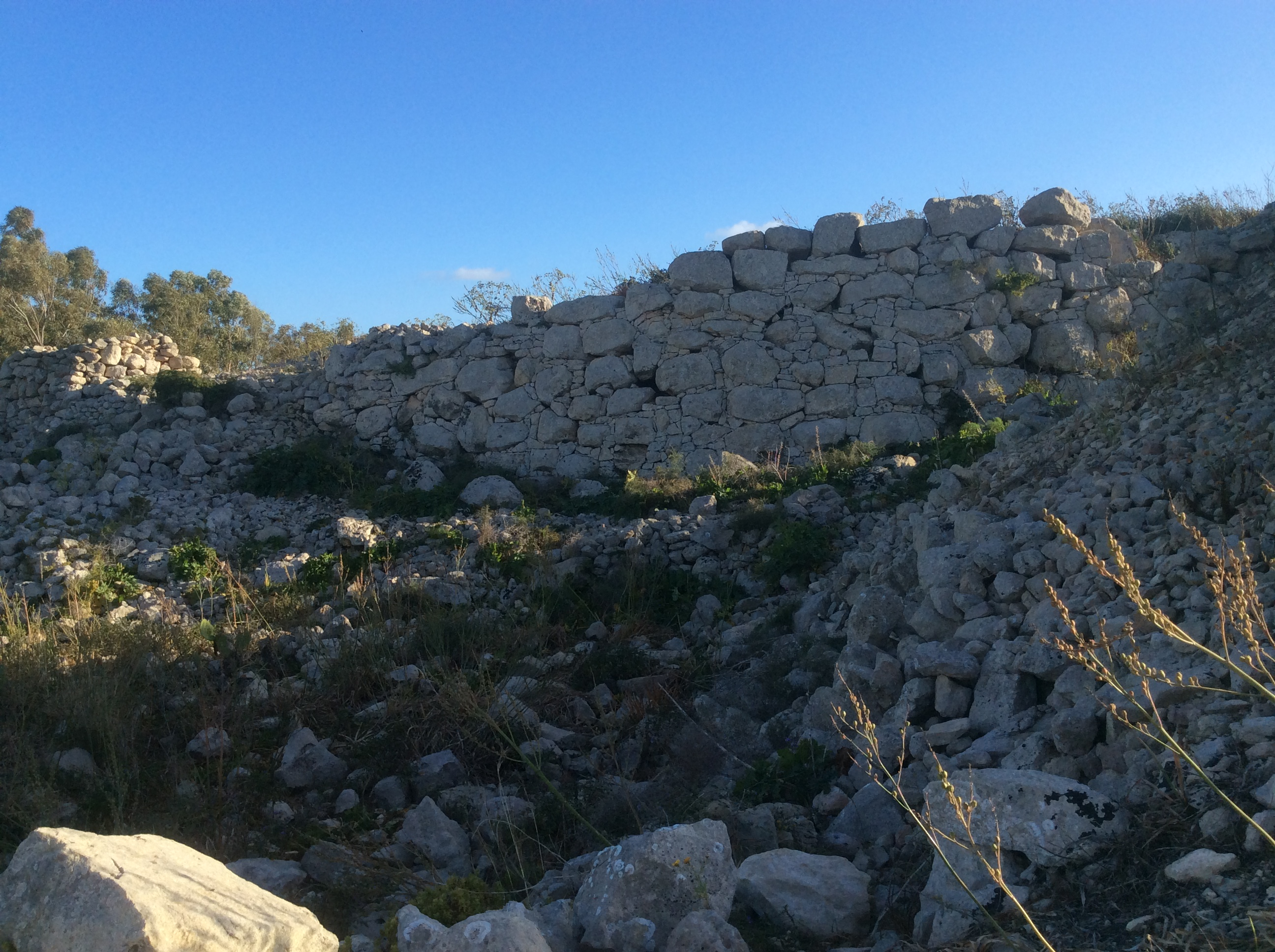
Remains of the Bronze Age fortification

In the Bronze Age period, a flourishing village colonized the site of the former temple as well as the surrounding area, which had since been abandoned. The temple was converted into a group of dwellings, and various huts were built in the area around it. The huts' foundations still exist, but they cannot be seen today since they were reburied after being excavated and studied. Scattered sherds were found in a large area all around the temple. Some of these were Mycenaean in origin, indicating that there was direct or indirect contact between the Maltese and Aegean civilization.

The inhabitants fortified their settlement with a 4.5m D-shaped bastion in order to bar access to the village. The wall was built facing inland, suggesting that the people living in the village were more concerned with attacks from the land than from the sea. After the area was excavated, the wall was not reburied and it still standing. It is believed to be the oldest surviving fortification in Malta, and it is the best preserved among the six sites in Malta identified as having been fortified settlements in the Bronze Age.

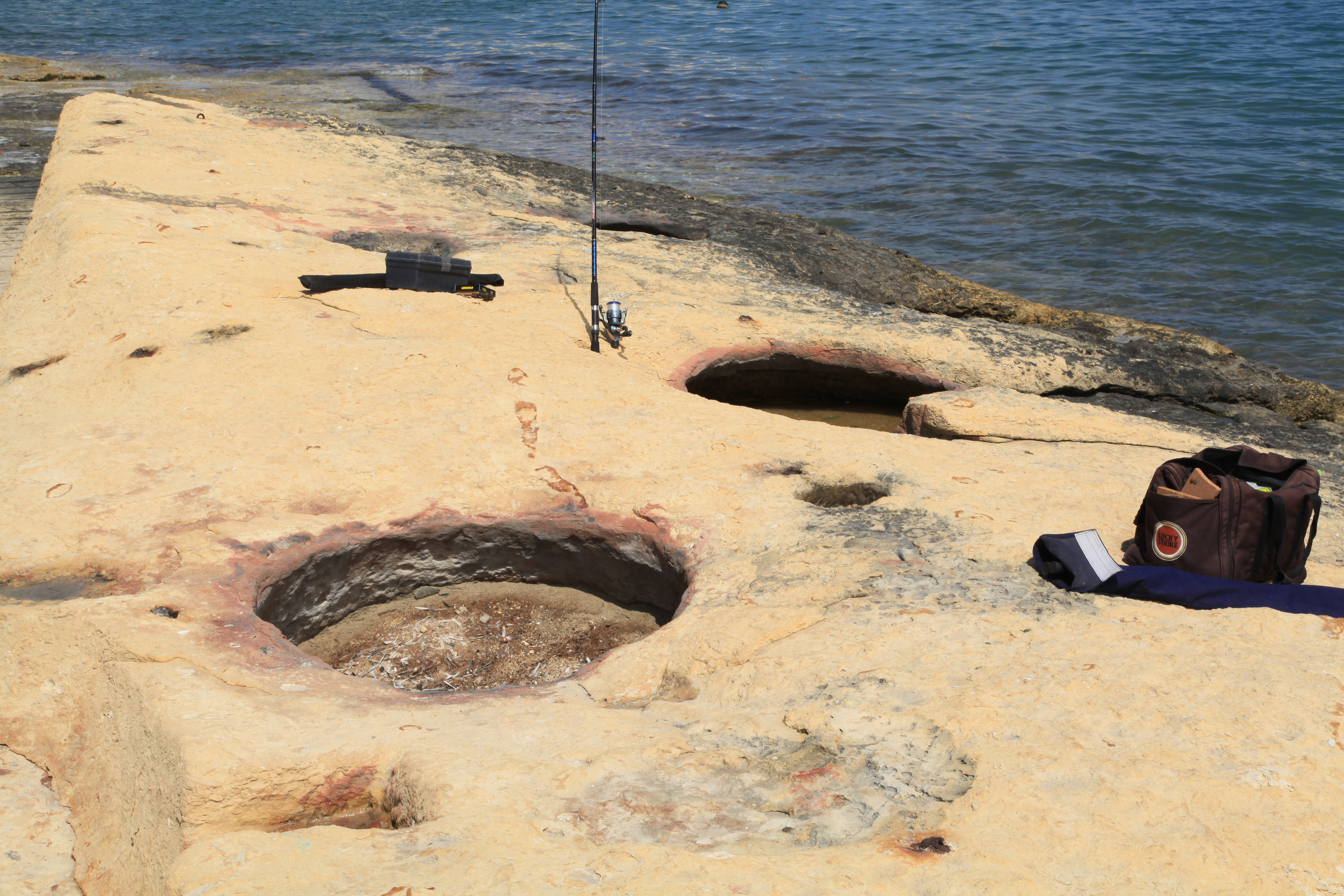
Silos at St. George's Bay, about 150m away from Borġ in-Nadur

Cart ruts and silos located in the area around Borġ in-Nadur are also believed to date back to the Bronze Age. The site is believed to have been abandoned around 500 BC, when Malta fell under the control of the Phoenicians.

== Excavations and recent history ==
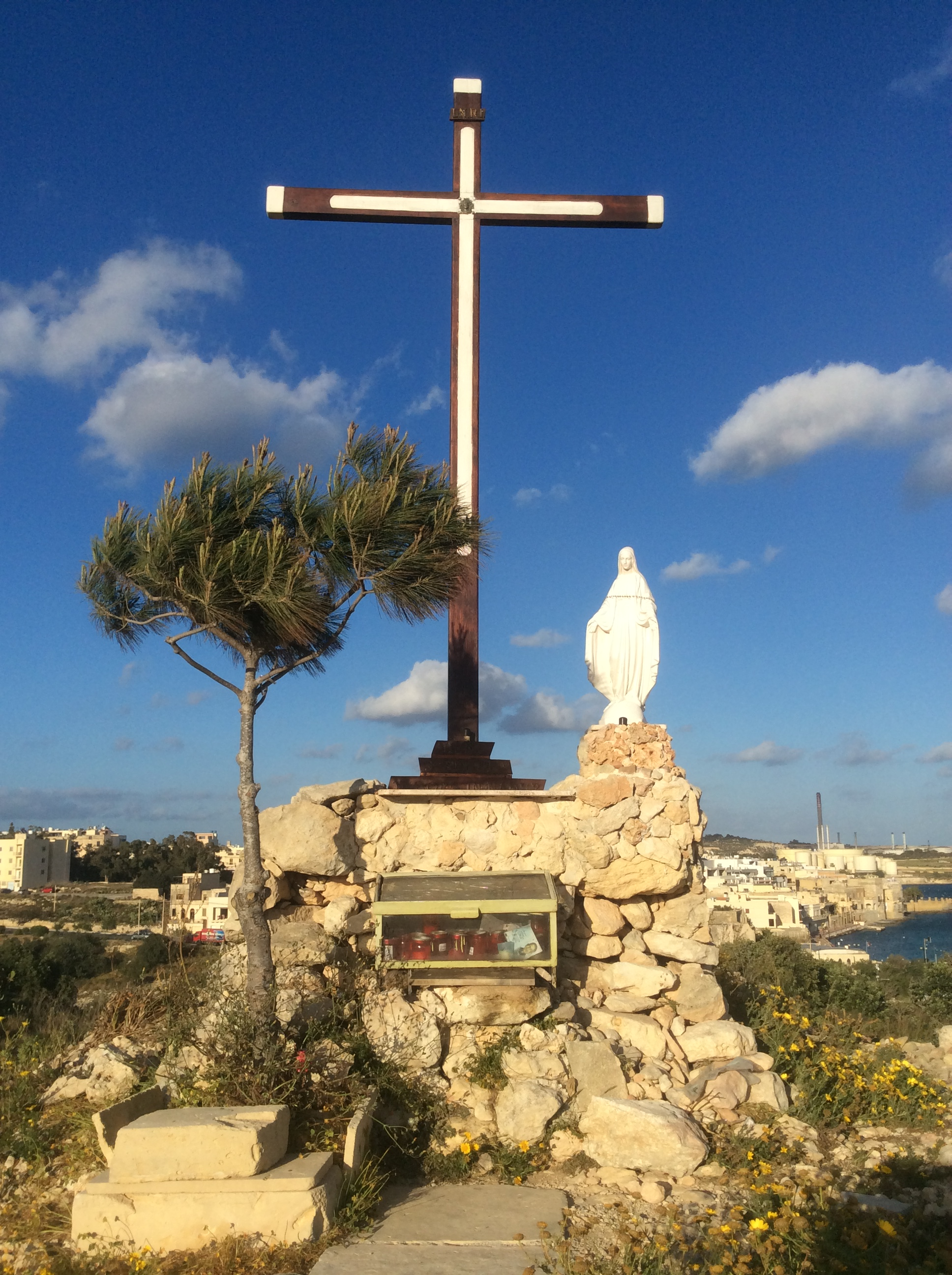
Cross on the top of Borġ in-Nadur Hill

The temple was discovered in the 16th century. The French cleric John Quintin noticed the various scattered megaliths and ruined structures and identified them as the ruins of a sanctuary of Hercules. The first excavations took place two centuries later, when Annetto Caruana dug various trenches inside the temple complex and discovered the Bronze Age fortification.

Other excavations took place in the 19th and 20th centuries. By now, it was thought that the temple was Punic in origin, and that it was dedicated to Melqart. In 1881, the first foundations of the Bronze Age huts in the fields surrounding the temple were discovered. After being excavated, the huts' foundations were reburied for preservation, but the ancient bastion was left exposed. The team leading the excavation restored the wall with new stones where the original ones were missing. The mound of earth that was removed in the excavation of this wall remains there to this day and it is now known as Borġ in-Nadur Hill.

On 31 May 1920, 32 prehistoric silos in the vicinity of Borġ in-Nadur were destroyed to make way for a new road. Another 41 silos were destroyed when the road was widened later on. Despite this, other silos still exist and can be seen in the area around St George's Bay. Between 1922 and 1927, Margaret Murray investigated the main temple area. Further excavations of the Bronze Age village took place in 1959, and the foundations were once again reburied after being studied.

The site was included on the Antiquities List of 1925.

The site is now closed to the public and its preservation is the responsibility of Heritage Malta. Today, Borġ in-Nadur is not very well preserved and appears as a large site, only slightly visible on the ground.

Since 2006, a local resident Angelik Caruana claimed to have seen visions of the Virgin Mary at Borġ in-Nadur Hill, and a cross was erected on the hill to mark these apparitions. In 2016, the church concluded that the apparitions were not divine.
