= Angelik Caruana =

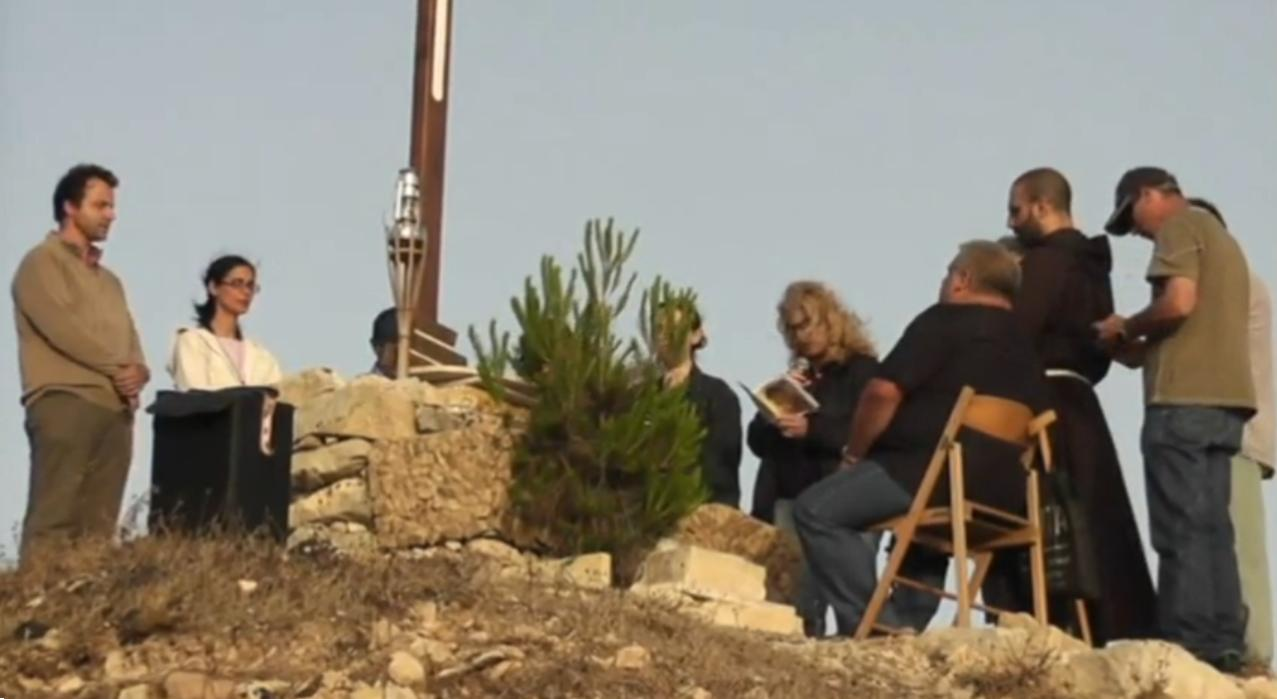
Caruana (seated, right) with a crowd of followers during an alleged apparition of the Virgin Mary in June 2010.

Angelik Caruana is a resident of Birżebbuġa in Malta who has reported a series of visions of the Virgin Mary since 21 April 2006, including a number of times at a hill in Borġ in-Nadur where he delivered monthly messages to the public.

Caruana originally made headlines in 2006 when he claimed that a statue of the Virgin Mary in his home was weeping blood and oozing oil. The blood was later identified as Angelik's own and the oil as burnt cooking oil. The Borġ in-Nadur site sometimes received more than 200 visitors, and Caruana has a number of followers who circulate his messages through newsletters and the internet.

In January 2016, the Catholic Church decreed that Caruana's messages were not divine in nature, and should not be promoted. The curia were particularly concerned over Caruana's "monetary gain" from the reported apparitions, and two cases where Caruana had told cancer patients that their illness has been cured, only for them to die weeks later.

== History ==
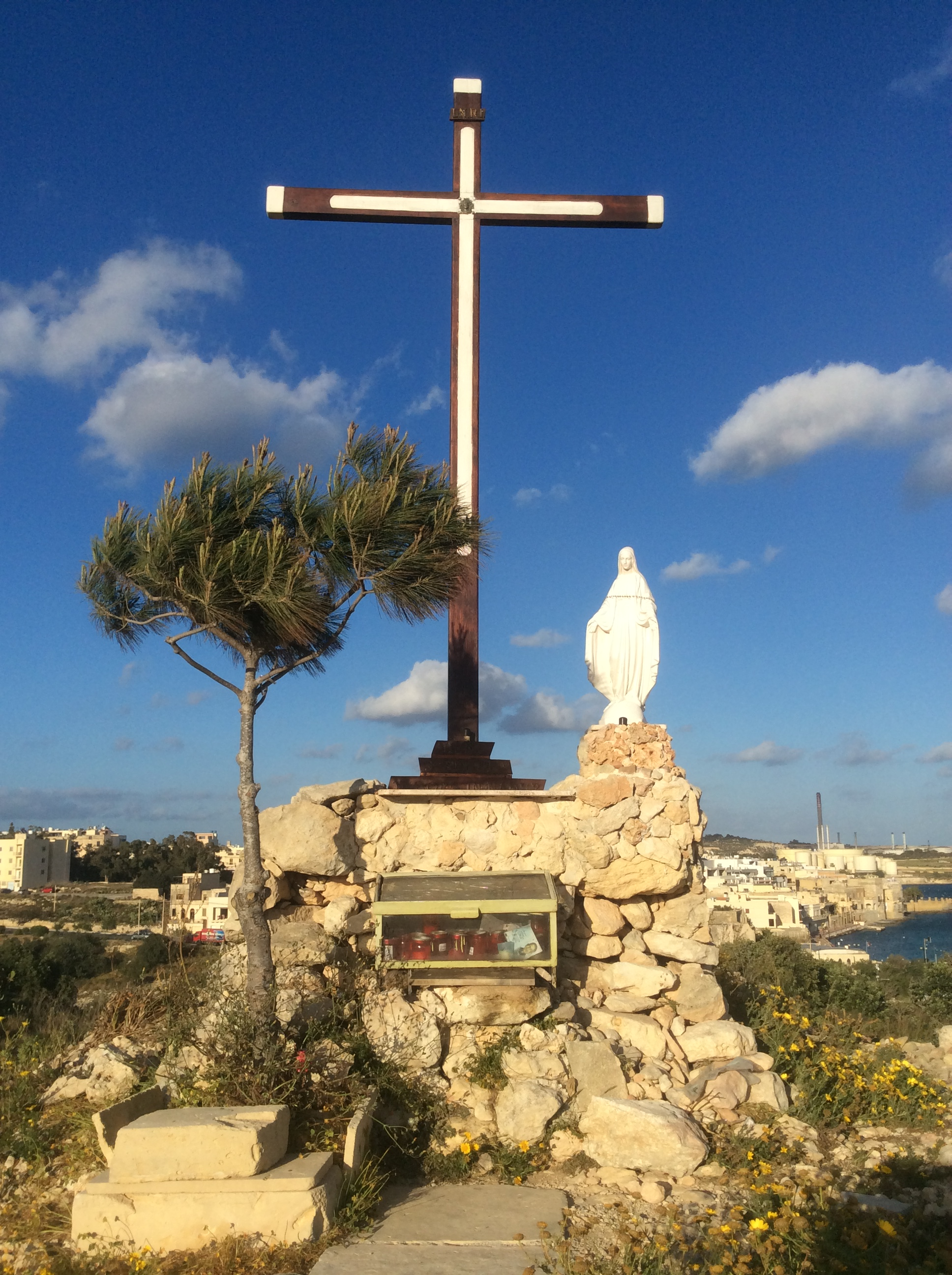
Cross, statue and tree on the top of Borġ in-Nadur Hill around the year 2018.

In January and April 2006, Caruana reported that a statue of the Virgin Mary in his house in Birżebbuġa was issuing tears of blood. Mrs. Caruana had felt so drawn towards the statue while it was on display in a Birzebbuga pet shop, that she immediately purchased it and placed it in a prominent place in her residence. Three days later, on 23 January, tears of a red liquid oozed from the statue. In April that year he reported his first vision of the Virgin Mary in a local church, in which she referred to herself as the "Immaculate Conception and the Queen of Peace and the Family" and asked for the urgent conversion of Maltese families, and prayer for the conversion of the people of Iran, Russia, America, China and Australia.

Apparitions began to occur more regularly, although without any pattern, and in June 2006, Caruana reported apparitions on the 19, 23 and 30. Father Hayden Williams was notified of the events and became Caruana's spiritual director under his own initiative, without the support of the church, accompanying him on many occasions during his apparitions.

Starting in December 2006, Caruana was reporting weekly apparitions on a hill at Borġ in-Nadur, which he described as "the special place Mother Mary has chosen for the apparitions". These apparitions included conversations with the Virgin Mary, visions of souls in Purgatory, vision of the Archangel Uriel, Satanic attacks, mystic visions of Jesus on the Cross, the apparition of the Eucharist on Caruana's hands and his subsequent Holy Communion, and visions of other supernatural phenomena.

During a vision on February 28, 2007, on Borg in-Nadur Hill, Angelik Caruana is reported to have said the Madonna told him she is appearing in Malta because she wants people to accept her son again.

The public messages Caruana gives on Borġ in-Nadur Hill are now recorded live by the priests accompanying him, and are read out to an audience. All the messages are also posted to an official website. Lengthy messages start out with "My dear children" where Caruana greets the listeners as the Virgin Mary's children. Caruana's messages have directed the pilgrims present to meditate on the rosary daily as the means to acquire peace, and have said that Mass is more of a necessity than visiting the site of Borġ in-Nadur, although Caruana has said that he believed the Virgin Mary wanted the people to visit the site and pray as "it is a special place that she herself has chosen".

In 2010, Caruana was directed by the Virgin Mary to travel to Gozo, Malta's sister island where he described further apparitions from her at a site in Xewkija. In 2011, Caruana travelled to the Vatican, where it was reported he climbed over a security barrier to interrupt a general audience with Pope Benedict XVI, in order to personally deliver a letter containing "devotional messages". Caruana was escorted from the venue by Vatican security.

== Other visions ==
Archangel Uriel is a guardian angel who Caruana describes as being visible only to him. Caruana has spoken of how the angel can transport his soul to different places. On a particular occasion, Caruana described how his soul was transported over five hundred miles to Medjugorje in Bosnia and Herzegovina. Uriel reportedly ministers the Eucharist to Caruana. Several witnesses have reported the Eucharist appearing out of nowhere, with Caruana receiving it in his hands and subsequent Holy Communion.

Caruana talks of communing with souls from Purgatory, who ask for intercession so that they might be transferred to heaven. The visits from the souls in Purgatory include a re-visitation at the time of their entrance in heaven, when Caruana is able to witness them entering the pearly gates. Caruana considers it important to pray for the departed. St. Francis of Assisi has also appeared in Caruana's visions, and has spoken to him about the need to "radically change the Church from the inside".

Caruana reports experiencing pain related to Jesus' sufferinġ Every Friday, he describes feeling the five wounds of Jesus during the Crucifixion, and occasionally the crown of thorns and the flagellation. Caruana believes that the Virgin Mary has told him that one day he will also demonstrate visible stigmata of these injuries.

Caruana has described several demonic attacks on his person, and has experienced three visions of Hell. In the first vision, the Virgin Mary's hands emitted a blazing fire that extended between the cross and the bronze-age wall, passing through an assembled crowd of the damned, who Caruana saw to be blaspheming and fighting one another. Within the flames and among the people Caruana perceived many devils that had the shape of humans and animals, who began to mock the people while hovering above them. Fr. Hayden reported Caruana as asking "Why is it Lady that you are now showing me hell?" Caruana experienced a similar vision in July 2008, causing him to weep, and request a sign from the Virgin Mary. He reported her reply as a request that she would only issue such a sign following sufficient conversion.

== Messages from the hill ==
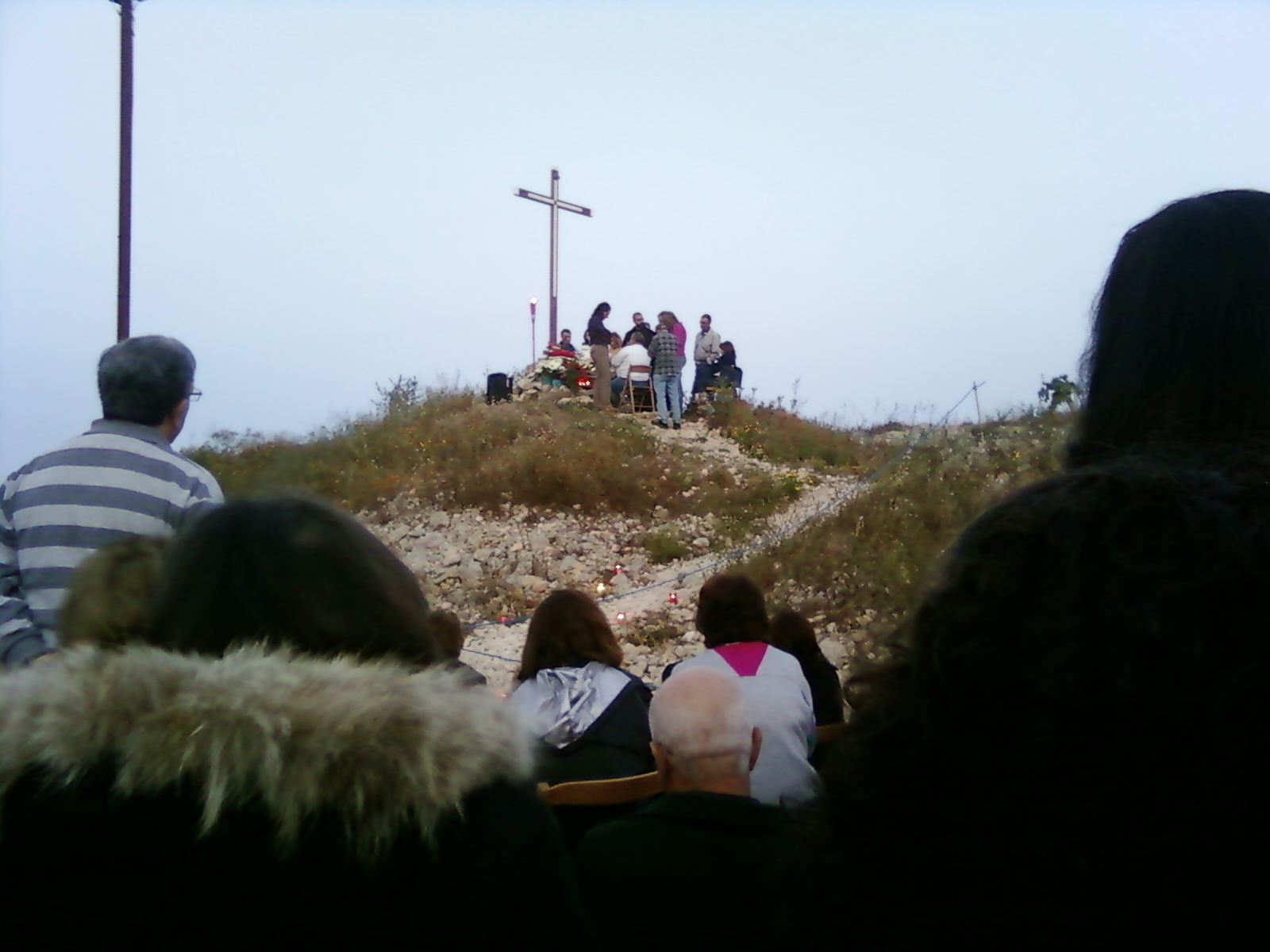
Caruana and followers on Borġ in-Nadur Hill around the year 2010.

Some of the messages recorded by Caruana take the form of teachings, on subjects such as the existence of Satan, the rejection of Halloween as an American "party" tradition, and the variety of sins which will condemn a soul to Hell, including abortion, divorce, euthanasia, pornography, drug abuse, child abuse and premarital sex. Modern attitudes to marriage have been singled out for particular concern, with Internet pornography and workplace sexual harassment being cited by Caruana as breaking up many thousands of families, and divorce being a source of "disorder and confusion", with children becoming "as though orphans".

Speaking on behalf of the Virgin Mary, Caruana has expressed messages of support for Malta's anti-abortion perspective, saying that only "those who have cast aside Jesus Christ can regard abortion as a good thing". He has also spoken of the dangers of drug abuse, which cause those around the abuser to suffer, and which he describes as a means of "Satanic rule". The Virgin Mary's suffering in relation to mankind's wrongdoing is frequently mentioned in Caruana's messages.

In 2010, Caruana began to speak on apocalyptic themes, quoting the Virgin Mary in saying that "the time of darkness and tribulation" was near, and that Malta was fortunate to have Caruana passing on messages from Jesus via Mary. Religious conversion is a recurring theme in the messages recorded by Caruana, who calls for an "urgent conversion" from all the countries of the world, particularly Iran, Russia, America, China and Australia.

Caruana has given messages which predict future events relating to the apparitions. On 5 August 2009, Caruana reported that the Virgin Mary had promised that miraculous water would issue from the plant at by the foot of the cross at Borġ in-Nadur Hill, "for two whole years". In June 2010, Caruana reported another message about the promised miraculous stream of water from the plant and said that the time when this will happen was "not far off". Again on 4 August 2010, a year after the first prediction, Caruana reported a message from the apparition which said "the time is fast approaching! The time for which my Son Jesus has sent me is near. Indeed, my children, soon the flow of water up here will be created." On 4 August 4, 2011, according to Caruana, the Virgin Mary was said to have promised a spring that would provide water that will heal the sick.

== Investigations ==
Fr. Hayden Williams O.F.M. (Cap) accompanied Caruana in an unofficial capacity since the start of the alleged visions in 2006, to February 2013, when his were duties were passed to Fr. Anton Gouder. The Church has made it clear that Fr Williams was not assigned by the Archbishop but took up the position under his own initiative.

In 2009, after Caruana had claimed to possess a statuette of the Madonna which wept blood and leaked oil on his kitchen table, a forensic investigator and a pathologist were commissioned by the Archbishop to investigate the claims. Tests on the substance showed it to be ordinary cooking oil, with the "blood" being a burnt form of the oil. The Archbishop's Curia investigated another case where Caruana reported blood on the face of a statue of the Madonna, and although the substance was shown to be human blood, an expensive forensic investigation identified it as Caruana's own.

In October 2012 church authorities in Malta issued a directive that phenomena and messages such as those alleged to occur at Borg in-Nadur were no longer to be announced and interpreted in the public fora. "...[I]n a spirit of discernment and evaluation of these alleged phenomena and messages, the authorities of the Church in Malta feel that the time is ripe to issue this directive". Furthermore, the church said that, Angelik Caruana will only attend activities at Borg in Nadur on the 26th of every month.

In 2016, the Archbishop's Curia issued a decree, signed by Archbishop Charles Scicluna, concluding that Caruana's messages were neither divine nor supernatural. The decision was reached following consultation with the College of Consultors and the Bishop of Gozo Mario Grech. The curia were concerned over Caruana receiving monetary gain from his reported apparitions, as Vatican policy is that "genuine apparition cases should not be linked to some monetary gain". Concern was also raised over a number of cases of "false miracles" claimed by Caruana, with two instances where he had told cancer patients that their illness has been cured, only for them to die within a month. The decree advised that "Priests, male and female religious, Catechists and all the Christian faithful are to refrain from the promotion, in any way whatsoever, of the said alleged apparitions, the said alleged messages and the other alleged mystical phenomena related to this case."
