= Birżebbuġa =

Birżebbuġa Birżebbuġa
- Local council
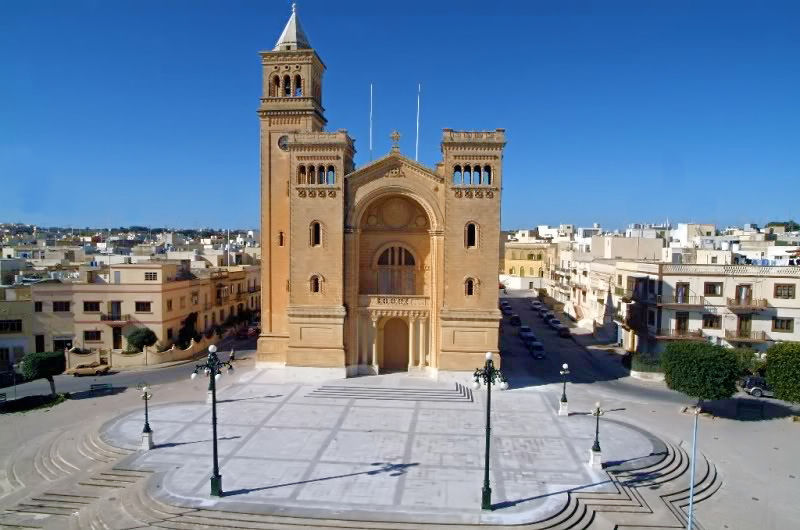
- Birżebbuġa Parish Church

- Flag Coat of arms
- Motto: Pax Salusque Omnibus (Peace and Health to Everyone)
- Coordinates: 35°49′32″N 14°31′41″E
- Country: Malta
- Region: Southern Region
- District: South Eastern District
- Borders: Għaxaq, Marsaxlokk, Żurrieq, Luqa

Government
  - Mayor: Scott Camilleri (PL)

Area
  - Total: 9.2 km^{2} (3.6 sq mi)
- Elevation: 20 m (66 ft)

Population (Jul. 2024)
  - Total: 12,467
  - Density: 1,400/km^{2} (3,500/sq mi)
- Demonym(s): Birżebbuġi (m), Birżebbuġija (f), Birżebbuġin (pl)
- Time zone: UTC+1 (CET)
  - Summer (DST): UTC+2 (CEST)
- Postal code: BBG
- Dialing code: 356
- ISO 3166 code: MT-05
- Patron saint: Saint Peter in Chains
- Day of festa: 1st Sunday of August
- Website: www.birzebbugalc.com

Birżebbuġa (Maltese pronunciation: [biːrzɛˈbːuːd͡ʒɐ]; sometimes shortened to B'Buġa) is a seaside town in the Southern Region of Malta, close to Marsaxlokk. It is approximately 13 kilometres (8 miles) from the capital Valletta. The population of Birżebbuġa was 12,467 in July 2024. This included 7,170 males and 5,297 females; 8,468 Maltese nationals and 3,999 foreign nationals.

The town is popular among Maltese holidaymakers, and is known for its sandy beach, Pretty Bay. The town is also notable for its important archaeological sites, especially Għar Dalam, Ta' Kaċċatura and Borġ in-Nadur.

== Etymology ==
"Birżebbuġa" means "well of olives" in the Maltese language.

== History ==
=== Prehistory ===
Għar Dalam is a natural cave and important archaeological site in Birżebbuġa. Għar Dalam was where the earliest evidence for human presence on Malta was discovered until excavations in Latnija Cave in 2025. Artefacts from Għar Dalam date back to the Neolithic Period some 7,400 years ago. The display area consists of two parts: the cave and the museum, which exhibit finds from animal bones to human artefacts. An overlaying river running at right angles formed the cave. It is some 144 metres deep, but only the first fifty metres are accessible to visitors.

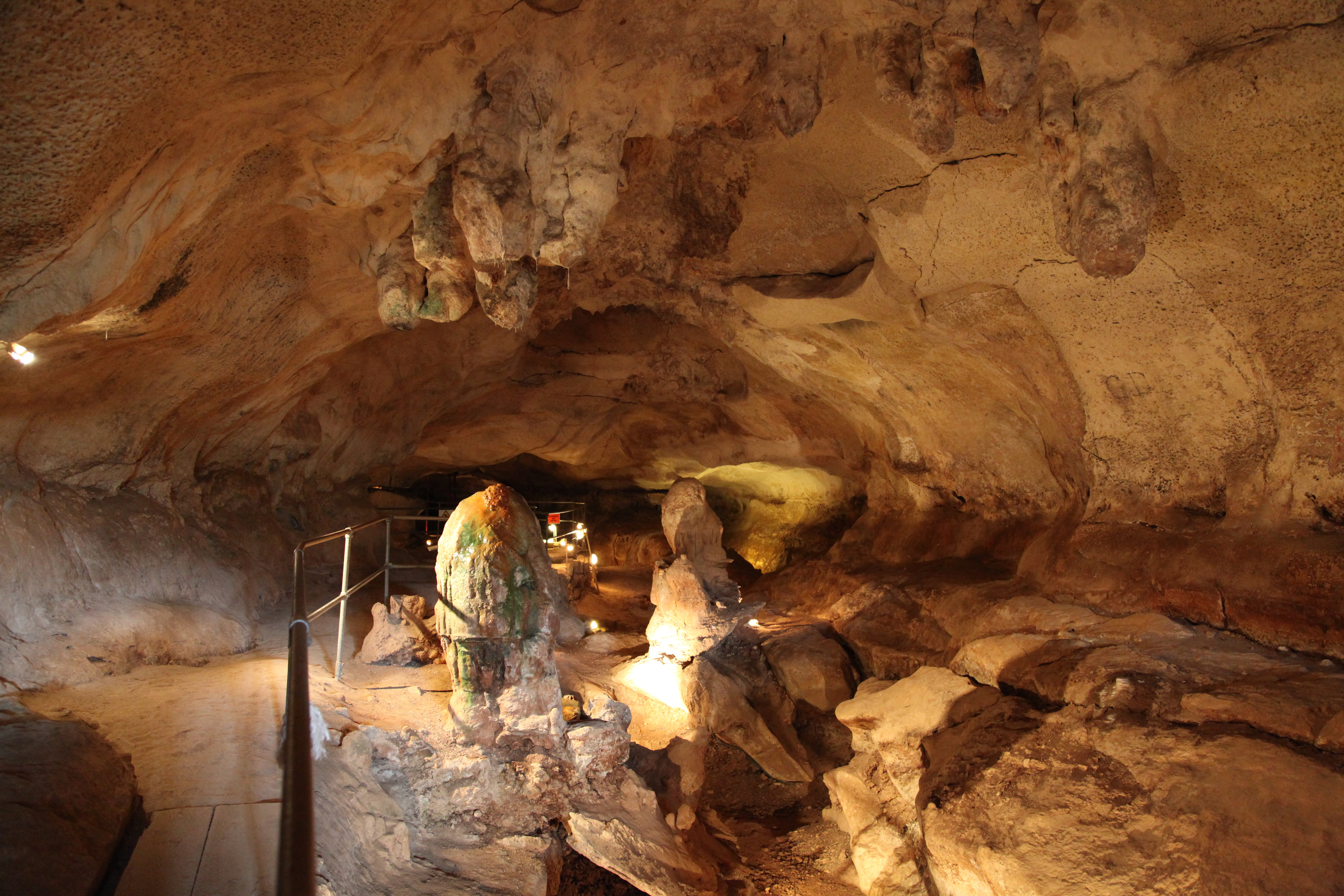
Għar Dalam

Other remains include those of a prehistoric temple and settlement, Borġ in-Nadur, which dates from the Bronze Age. The settlement was fortified with a large stone wall, still visible today. These temple ruins are important because they reveal not only a four-apse temple (c.2000 BC), but a fortified Bronze Age domestic settlement. The remains of a large, defensive wall lie nearby, running across the head of a promontory between two valleys leading down to two bays. The wall was built facing inland. The village would have had the sea to its back. Scholars believe the people living in the village were more afraid of being attacked by invaders by land rather than from the sea. Birżebbuġa also has cart ruts that lead into the sea and run along the sea floor. Nearby Borġ in-Nadur, in the area of San Ġorġ can be found several Bronze Age silos, many of which have been destroyed.

=== Punic-Roman Period ===
Malta was colonised by the Phoenicians in the 9th century BC and later formed part of the Carthaginian and Roman empires. An agricultural villa can be found across the valley from Għar Dalam, known as Ta' Kaċċatura, which dates to the Punic-Roman period. It features a large underground cistern and the complex formed part of an olive oil industry on the island in the Punic-Roman period.

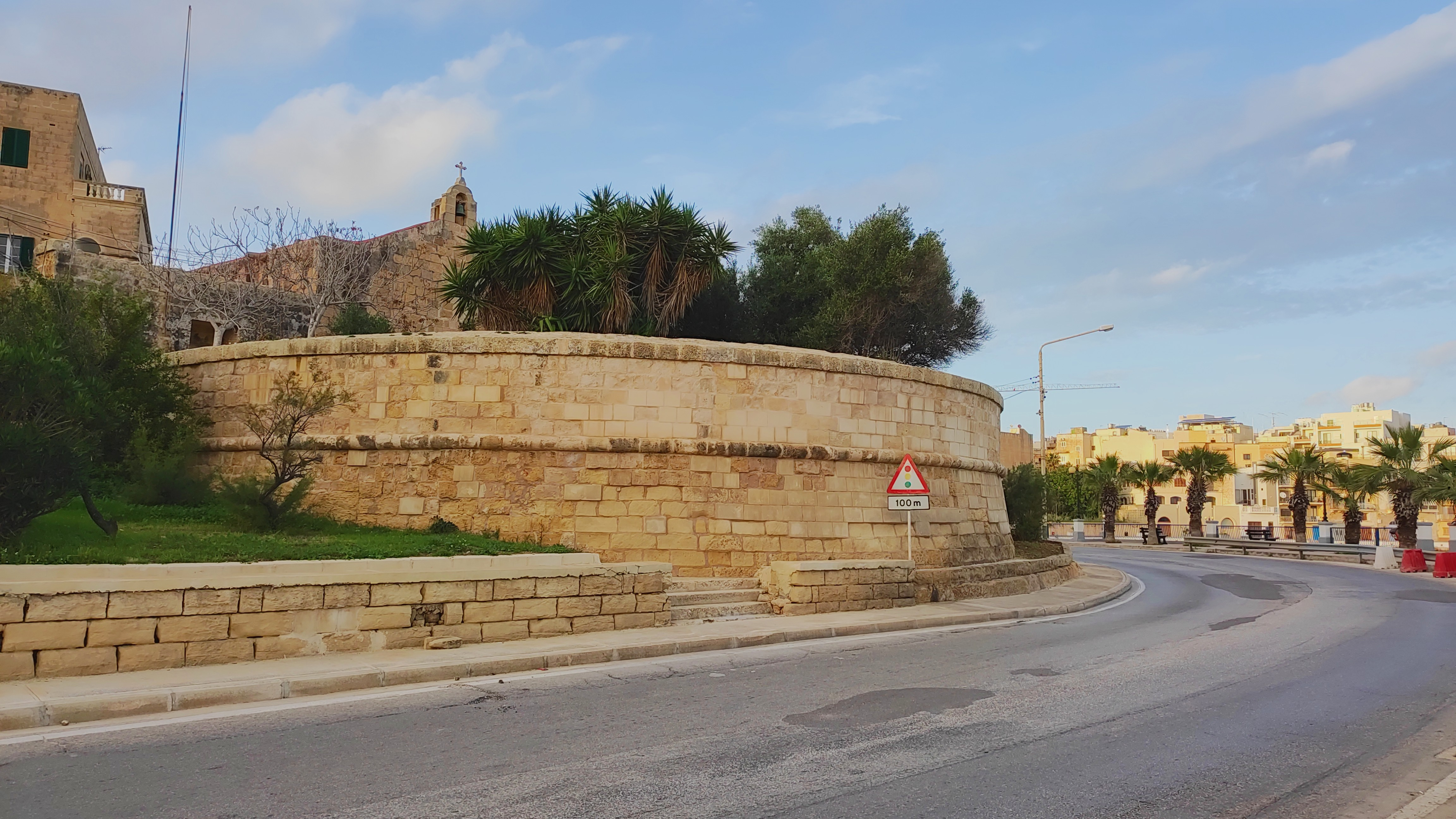
Saint George Redoubt, built in 1714, incorporating St. George's Church.

=== Hospitaller Period ===
Malta was granted to the Order of St. John in 1530 by Charles V and remained on the islands until the French invasion of Malta in 1798. The Order built several military structures in Birżebbuġa, including Saint George Redoubt, Ferretti Battery, Pinto Battery and Bengħisa Tower. Other buildings from this period include Casa Ippolito (Maltese: Dar ta' Pultu), built in 1664, and St. George's Church.

=== Modern history ===
Malta became a British crown colony in 1813 and remained so until independence in 1964. During the British period, Fort Benghisa, RAF Kalafrana and RAF Hal Far were built in Birżebbuġa.

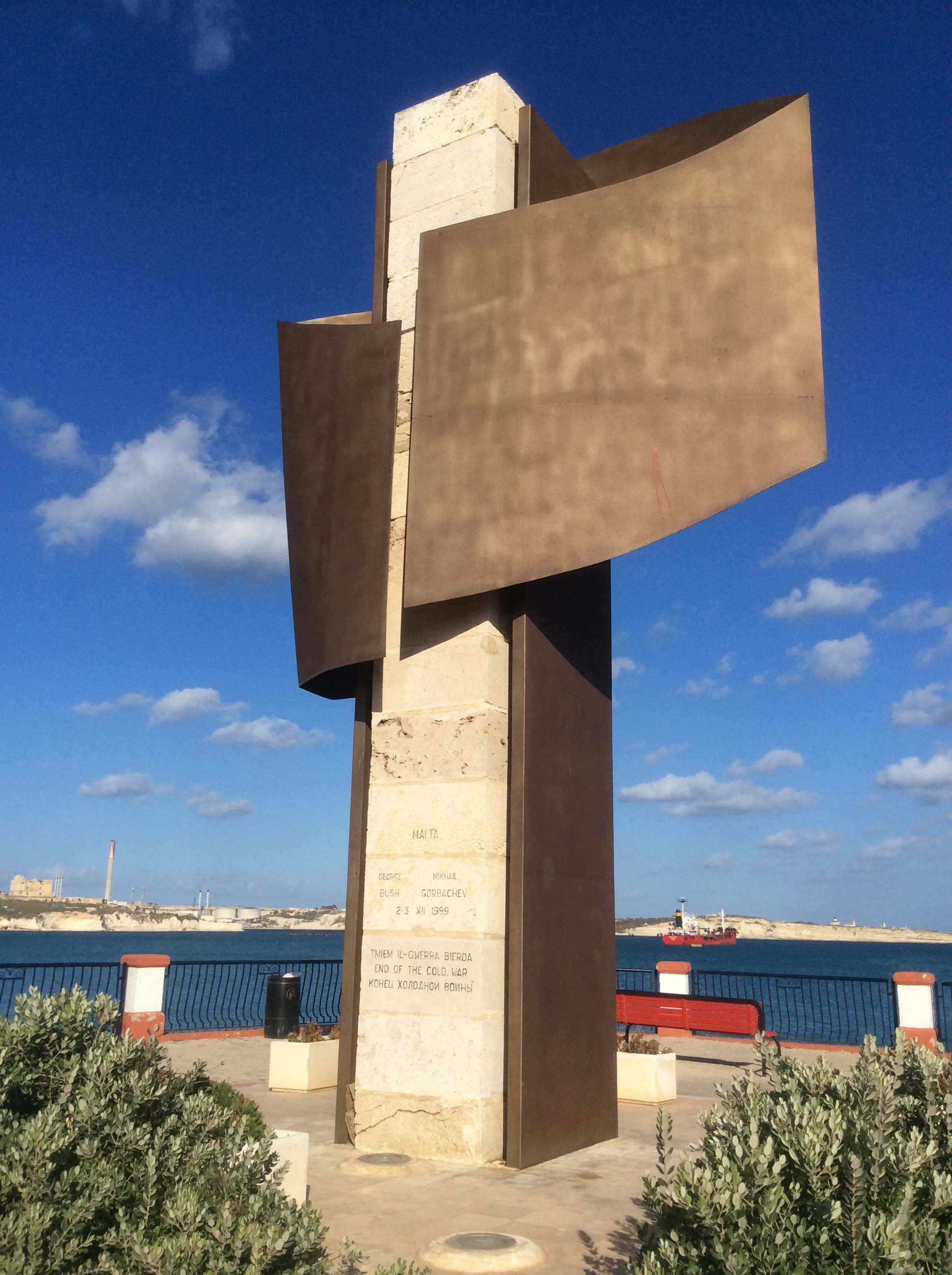
Monument in Birżebbuġa commemorating the Malta Summit

Churches built in this period include:

- the Chapel of the Immaculate Conception, Bengħisa (1822, enlarged in 1862),
- the Holy Family Chapel (1865),
- the Chapel of Our Lady Help of Christians (1839), private;
- St Joseph’s Chapel (1871), private; and
- the Church of Our Lady of Sorrows (1909), which served as the parish church until 1938. Birżebbuġa became a formal parish on 9 September 1913, with a resident priest.
- the Church of St. Peter in Chains (1938), parish church.

A monument in Birżebbuġa commemorates the Malta Summit, which took place close by on 3 December 1989.

Starting from 1988, the Malta Freeport in Birżebbuġa has served as a Mediterranean transshipment hub.

The town is built around the beach, which puts it close to many shops and restaurants along the coastline. Some vacationers prefer the rocky shore in the neighbouring St George's Bay, ideal for sunbathing and snorkelling. Sailing is popular throughout the year. St George's Bay is also used by local fishermen who moor their boats at the inlet.

== Transport ==
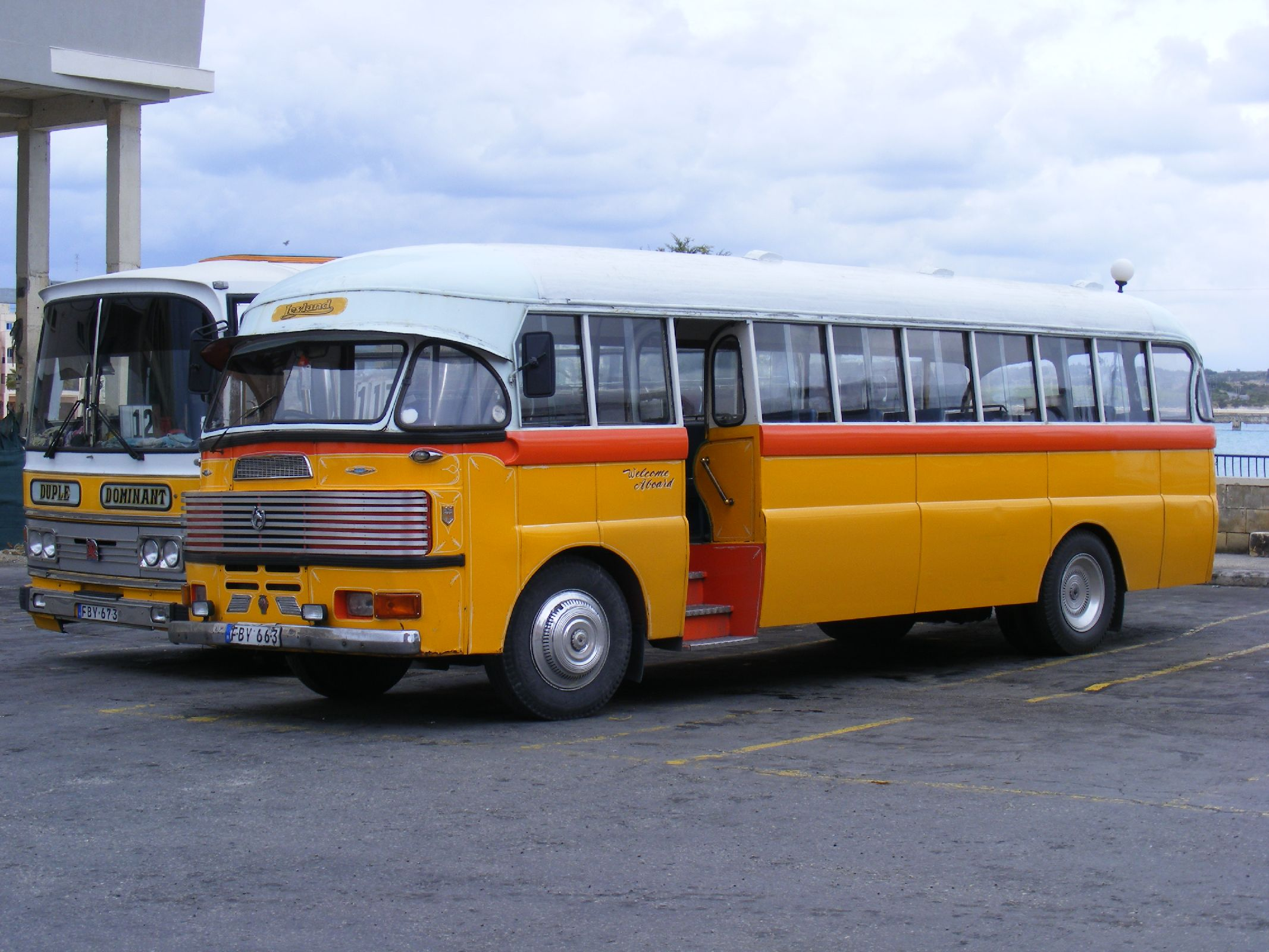
Malta bus in Birżebbuġa

To get to Birzebbuga from Valletta you will have to board either the 82, 80 or X4 bus. The X4 passes every 30 minutes to Birzebbuga, 80 every hour and 82 passes every 15 minutes during the rush hour and 20–30 minutes at other times.

There are two other routes that pass from Birzebbuga; route 210 which travels to and from Mater Dei Hospital and the University of Malta; and route 119 which travels through Birzebbuga and ends at the Malta International Airport and Marsascala.

== Sports ==
The locality hosts a number of football teams. Birżebbuġa St. Peter's F.C. currently compete in Group A of the Maltese National Amateur League (after a merging of the now defunct Maltese Second Division and the Maltese Third Division), after languishing at the bottom of Maltese football for years. The highest tier Birzebbugia St. Peter's has played in was the Maltese First Division. The club was promoted to this division in 2010, due to a league expansion, but was subsequently relegated in 2015. As well as its Seniors' team, the club also possesses a prosperous nursery which is run by Birzebbuga Windmills FC.

Birzebbuga St. Peters' is also in a collaboration with a newly founded futsal team, Birzebbuga St. Peters' FC Futsal, which is competing in the Maltese Futsal Fourth Division Section A as of 2011. Apart from these clubs, an amateur football team is also present, Birzebbuga Tigers FC.

Birzebbuga also has its own water polo team, Birzebbuga A.S.C. (also known as Birzebbugia Freeport), which plays in the Maltese Waterpolo First Division.

Furthermore, Birzebbuga has its own 'Boċċi' club, which competes in the Second Division of the Maltese Bocci Federation League.

== Zones in Birżebbuġa ==
- Bengħisa
- Borġ in-Nadur
- Brolli
- Girgħien
- Għajn Blat, opposite Għar Dalam
- Għar Dalam
- Għar Ħasan, limits of Ħal Far
- Ħal Far
- Kalafrana
- L-Arblu, limits of Ħal Far
- L-Artal, limits of Ħal Far
- L-Imwadar, limits of Bengħisa
- Pretty Bay (Il-Bajja s-Sabiħa)
- Qajjenza
- St. George's Bay (Bajja San Ġorġ)
- Ta' Ġiliġejla, limits of Bengħisa
- Ta' Salvun, limits of Ħal Far
- Ta' Sansajna
- Ta' Żgħer, limits of Ħal Far
- Tal-Għawejra, limits of Ħal Far
- Tal-Papa
- Tal-Kuġin
- Tax-Xerriek
- Wied Dalam
- Wied il-Buni
- Wied ix-Xoqqa, limits of Bengħisa
- Wied Qoton
- Wied Żembaq
- Wied Żnuber, limits of Ħal Far
- Xoqqiet, limits of Bengħisa

== Twin towns ==
- Porto San Giorgio, Italy
- Azas, France

== Gallery ==
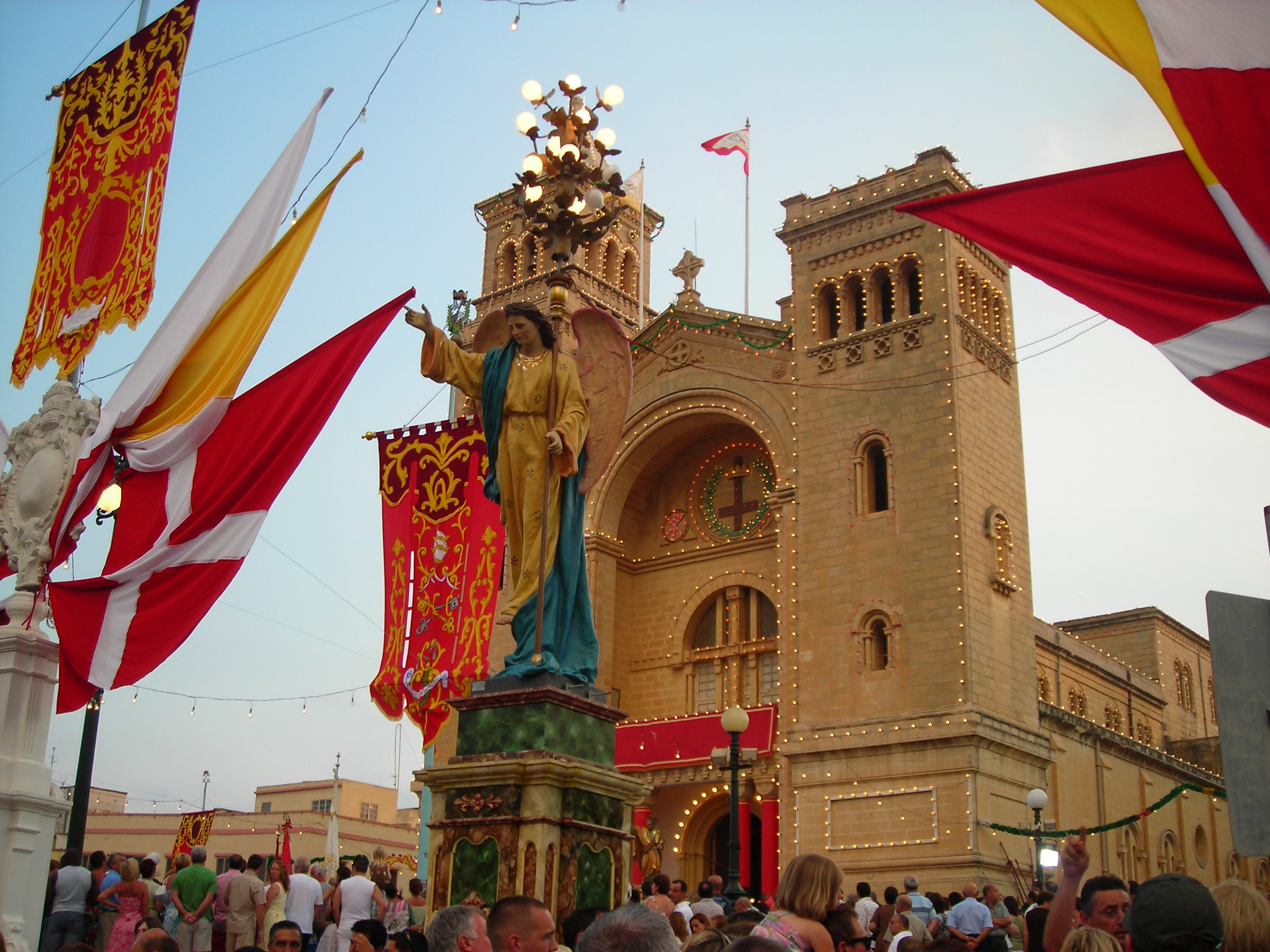
Birżebbuġa during the feast of St. Peter in Chains.

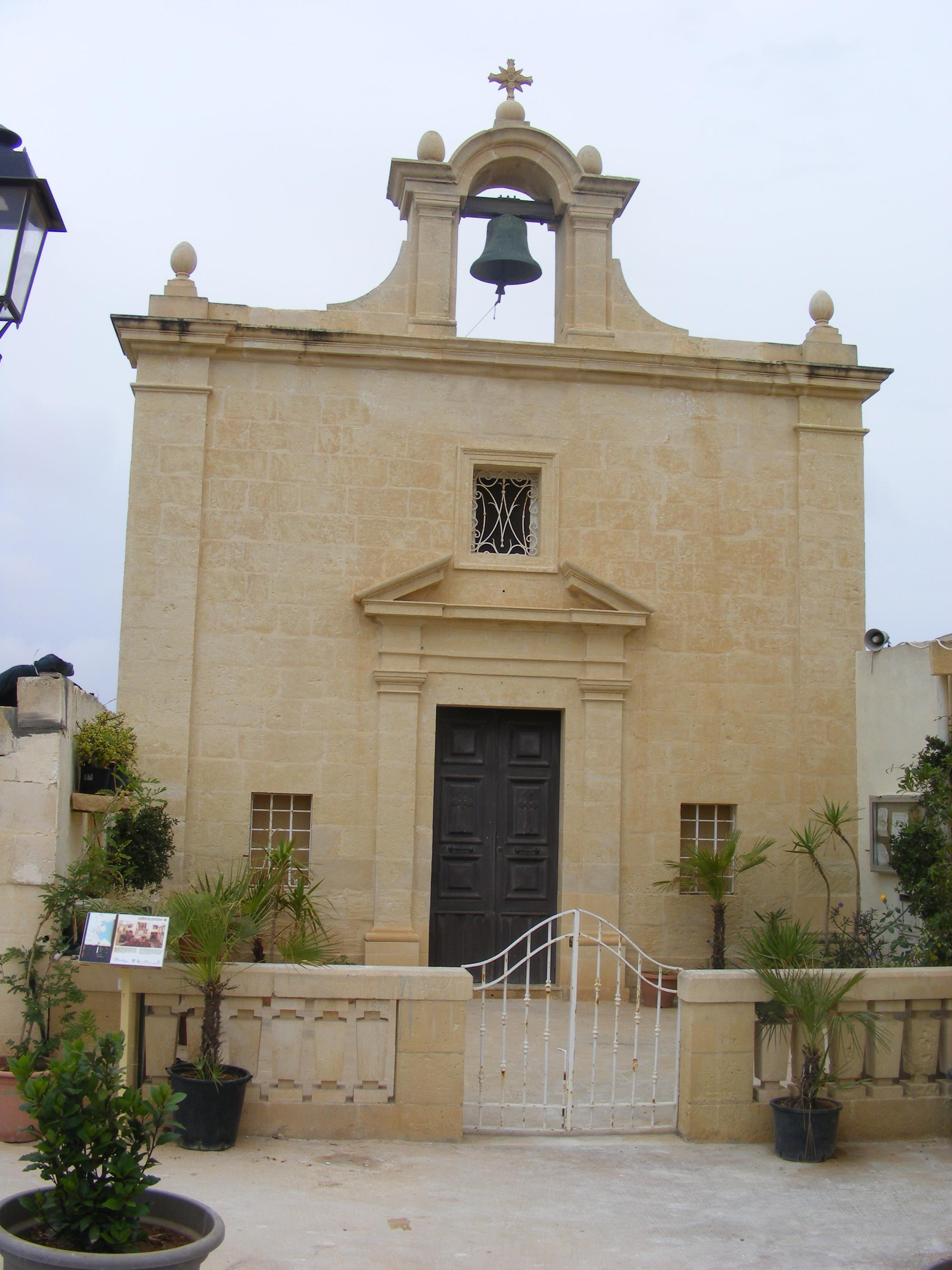
Chapel of the Immaculate Conception, Bengħisa

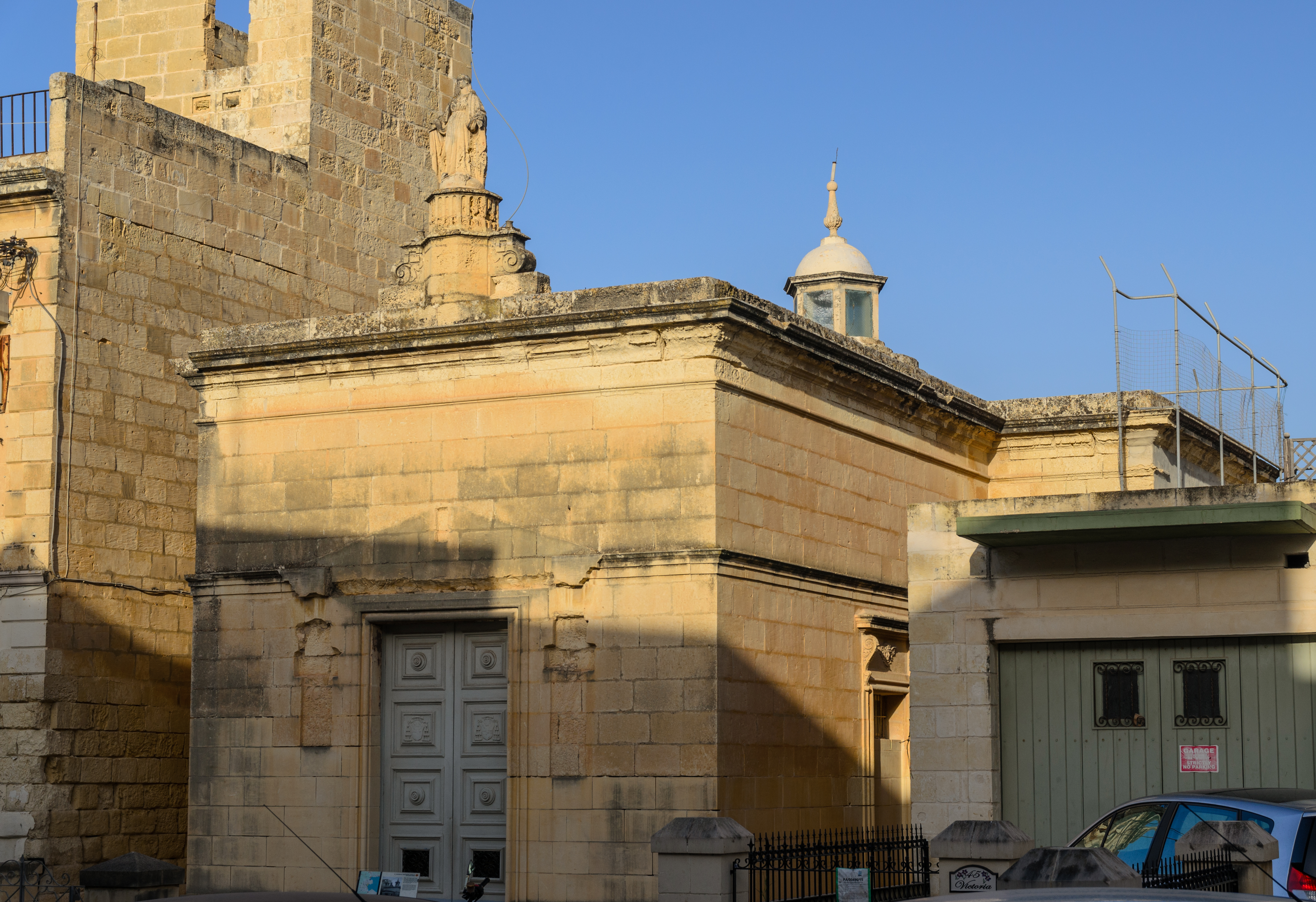
Chapel of the Holy Family, Birżebbuġa

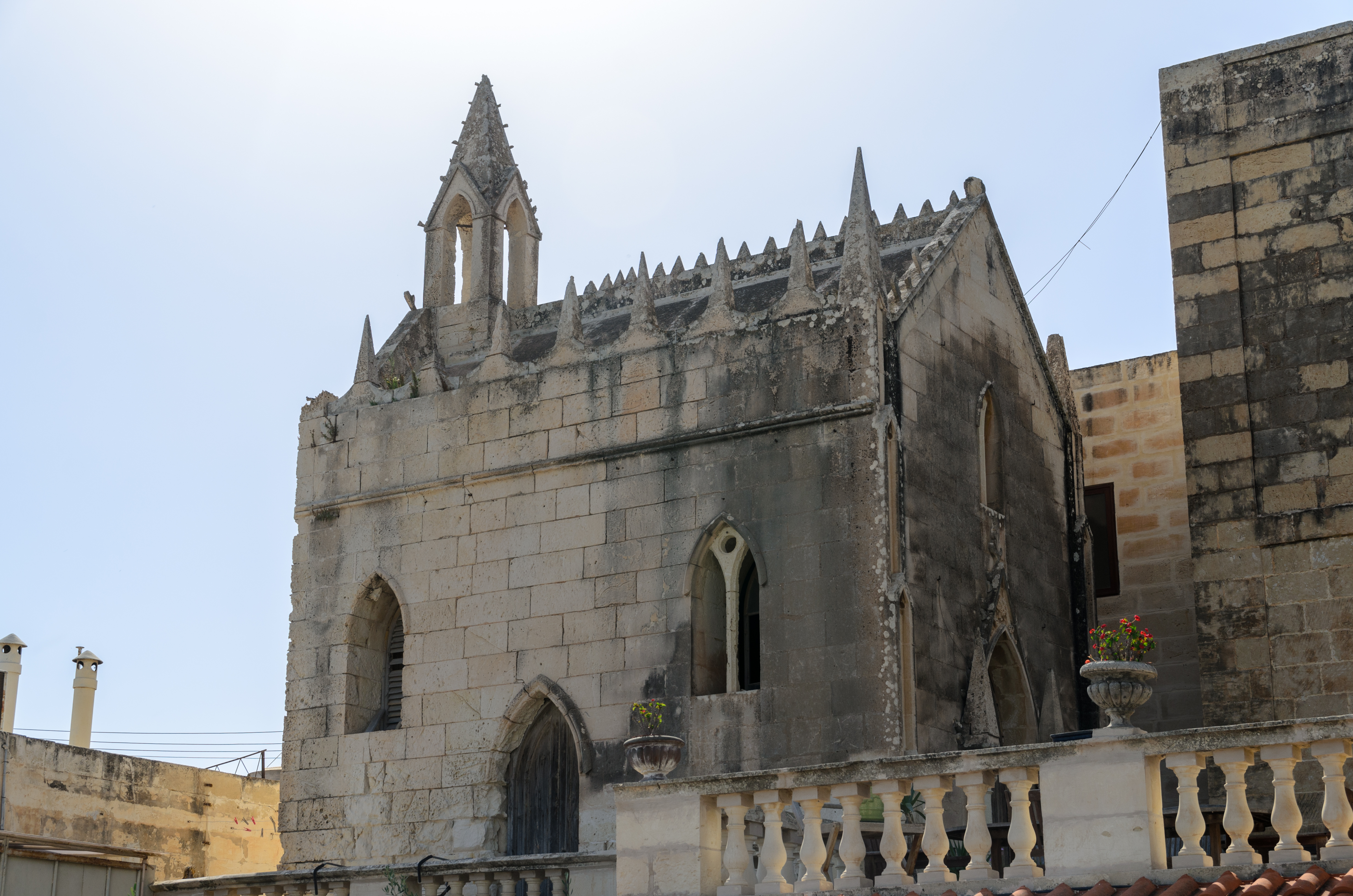
St. Joseph's Chapel, Birżebbuġa

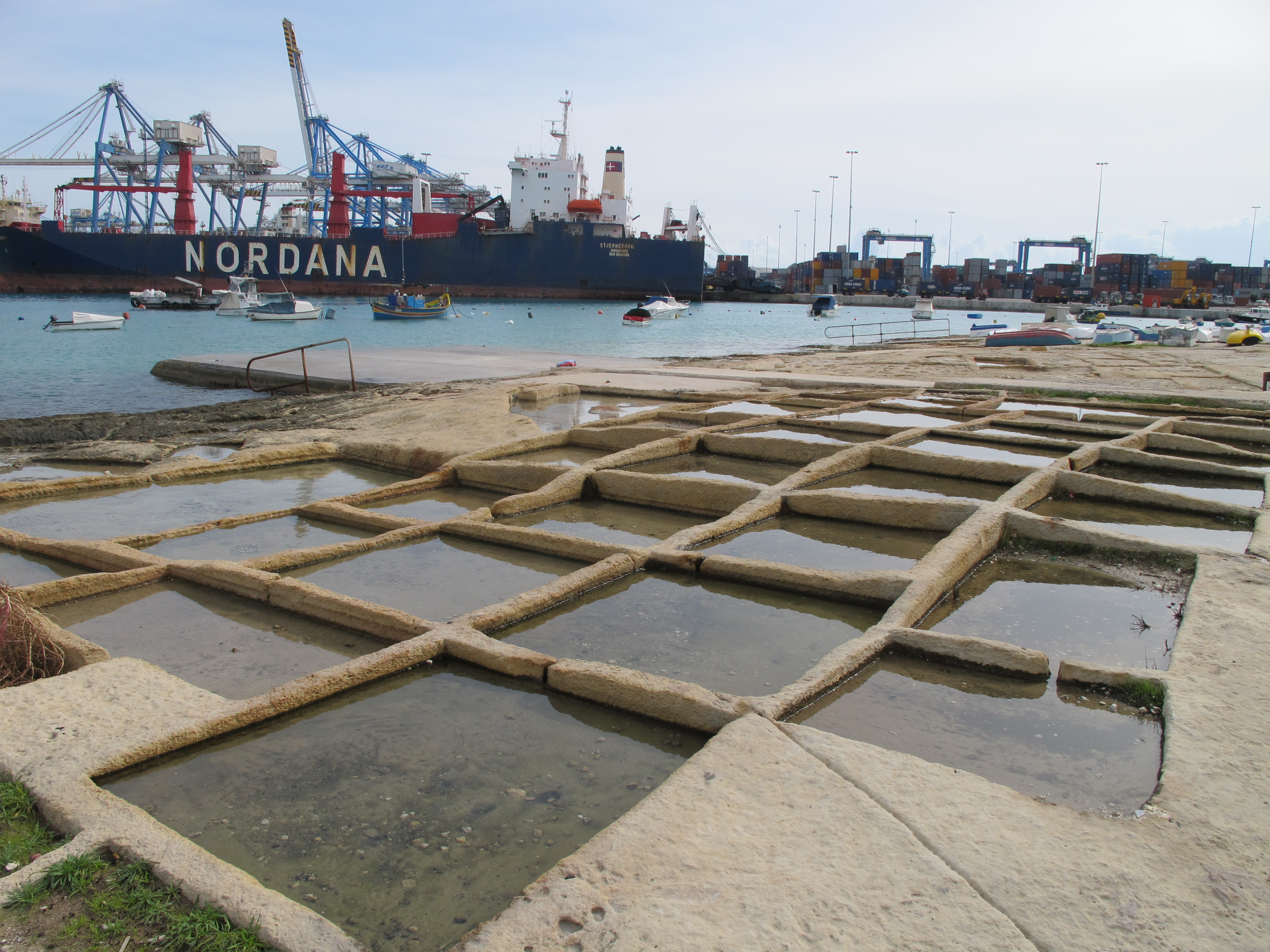
Malta Freeport and salt pans in Birżebbuġa
