= Pinto Battery =

Former artillery battery in Birżebbuġa, Malta

- Batterija ta' Pinto
- Birżebbuġa, Malta
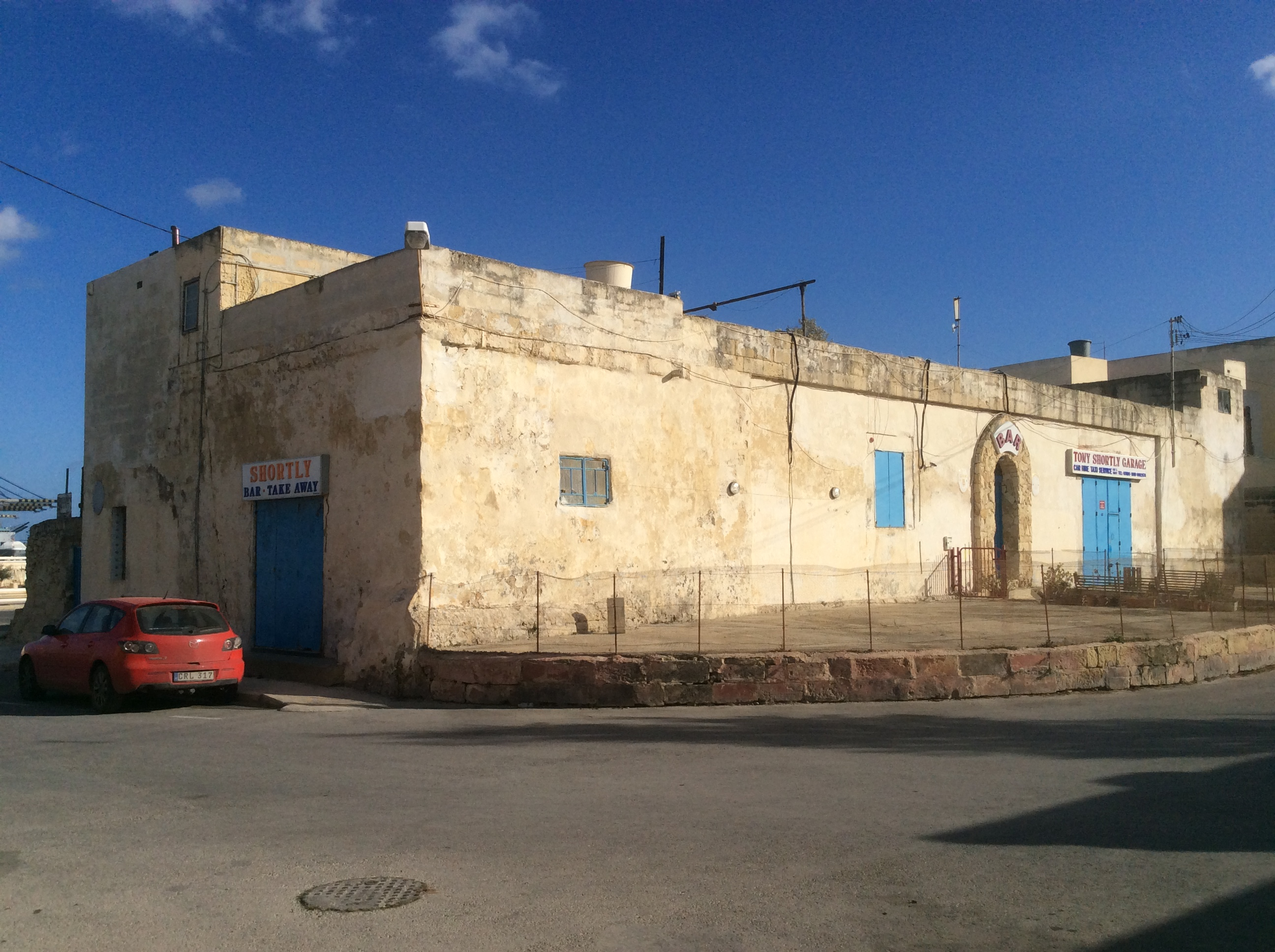
- Pinto Battery's blockhouse

Site information
- Type: Artillery battery
- Owner: Government of Malta
- Controlled by: Private tenants
- Open to the public: No
- Condition: Blockhouse intact but heavily altered, gun platform largely destroyed

Location
- Coordinates: 35°49′36″N 14°31′58.5″E

Site history
- Built: 1715–1716
- Built by: Order of Saint John
- Materials: Limestone

Pinto Battery (Maltese: Batterija ta' Pinto), also known as Għżira Battery (Maltese: Batterija ta' Għżira) or Kechakara Battery, is a former artillery battery in Birżebbuġa, Malta. It was built by the Order of Saint John in 1715 and 1716 as one of a series of coastal fortifications around the coasts of the Maltese Islands. The battery has been heavily altered over time, and the blockhouse now houses a bar and a garage, while the gun platform and parapet have been largely destroyed, with only the general outline still visible.

== History ==
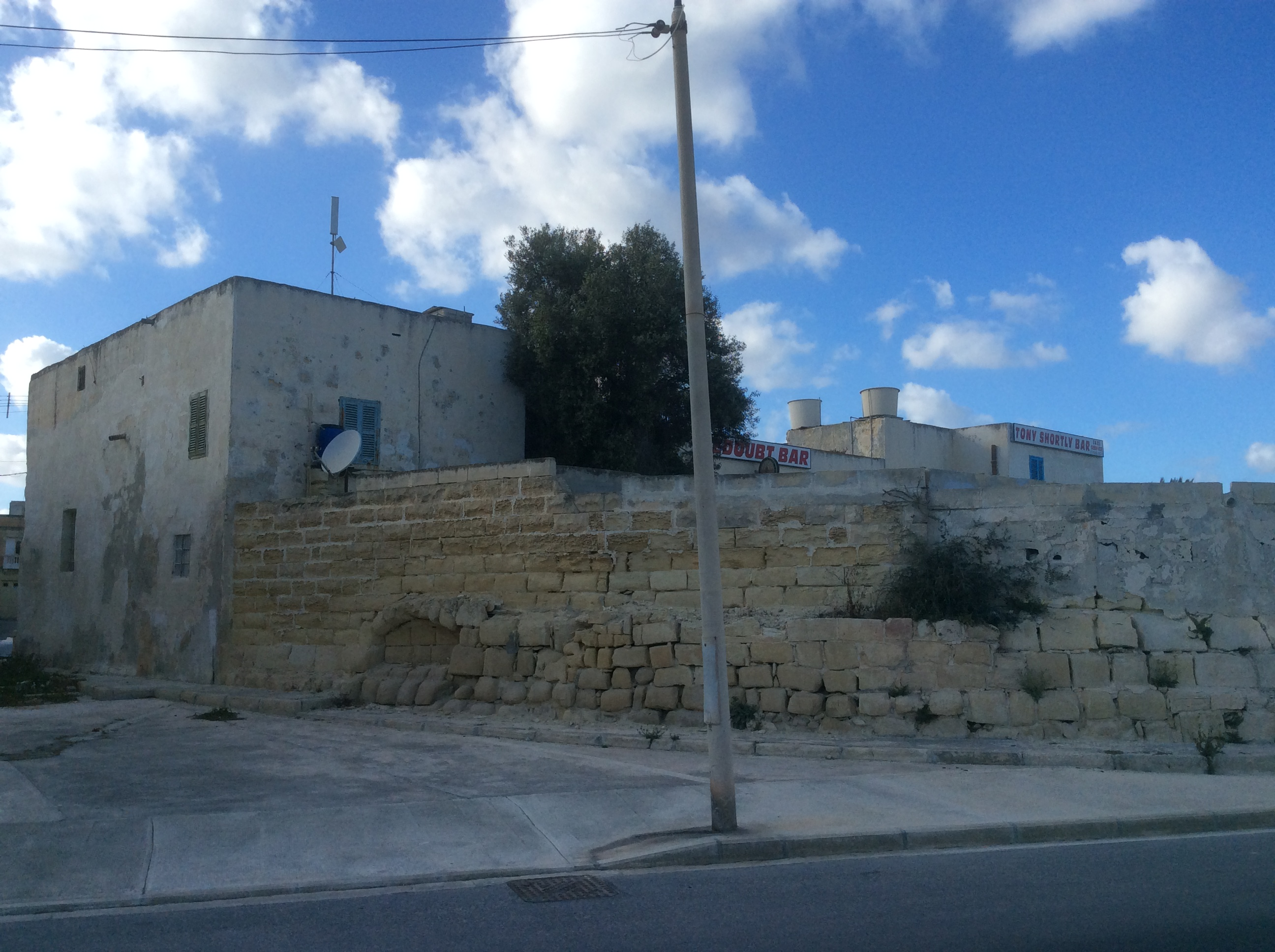
View of the battery from the southwest, with the remains of the gun platform to the right and the blockhouse to the left

Pinto Battery was built in 1715-1716 as part of the first building programme of coastal batteries in Malta. It was part of a chain of fortifications that defended Marsaxlokk Bay, which also included six other batteries, the large Saint Lucian Tower, two smaller De Redin towers, four redoubts and three entrenchments. Construction of the battery cost 1109 scudi.

The battery originally consisted of a semi-circular gun platform, with a parapet containing eight embrasures. Its gorge had a large rectangular blockhouse protected by a redan. The battery's entrance was located within the redan. It was originally armed with cannons.

== Present day ==
The battery has undergone major alterations over time, being largely destroyed in the process. The redan has been destroyed, while the blockhouse is a bar and a garage. The general outline of the semi-circular gun platform is still visible, although the parapet with embrasures no longer exists.
