= Malta Freeport =

Coordinates: 35.818°N 14.54°E

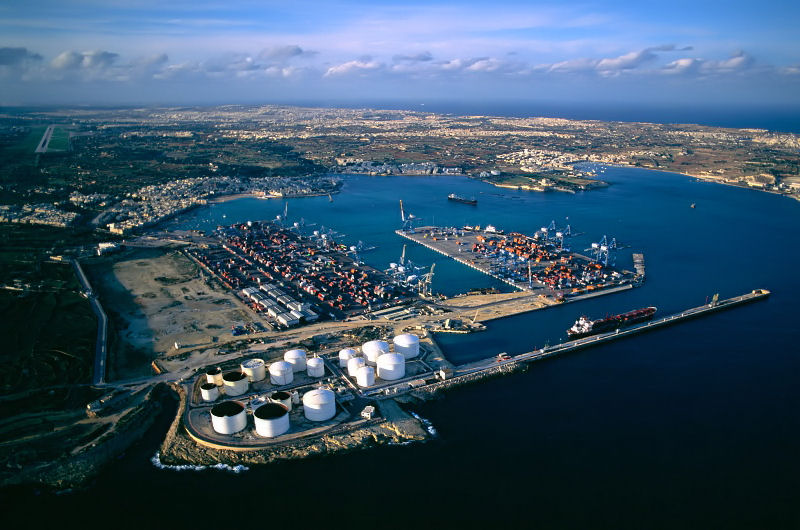
- View of the Malta Freeport
- Click on the map for a fullscreen view

Location
- Country: Malta

Details
- Opened: 1988
- Operated by: Malta Freeport Terminals Ltd
- Owned by: Malta Freeport Corporation Ltd
- Land area: about 0.771 square kilometres (77.1 ha)

Statistics
- Vessel arrivals: 2,189
- Annual container volume: 3,060,000 TEU's
- Website http://www.maltafreeport.com.mt

Malta Freeport (Maltese: Il-Port Ħieles) is an international port on the island of Malta with a trade volume of 3.06 million TEUs in 2015. Malta Freeport is one of busiest ports in Europe. The port is situated in Birżebbuġa in the southeastern part of Malta, on the site of the former seaplane base RAF Kalafrana.

Established in 1988, Malta Freeport was the first transshipment hub in the Mediterranean region. The company currently ranks twelfth among the top European ports and is the third largest transshipment and logistics centre in the Mediterranean region. Over 95% of the Freeport's container traffic is transshipment business with demand growth triggering successive rounds of funding and ownership changes.

Malta Freeport is the Mediterranean's third largest transshipment port. A planned expansion would increase its quay length on both terminals from the present operational length of 2.2 kilometres to over 3 kilometres and the total area (from 680,000 m^{2}) to 790,000 m^{2} (0.79 km^{2}).

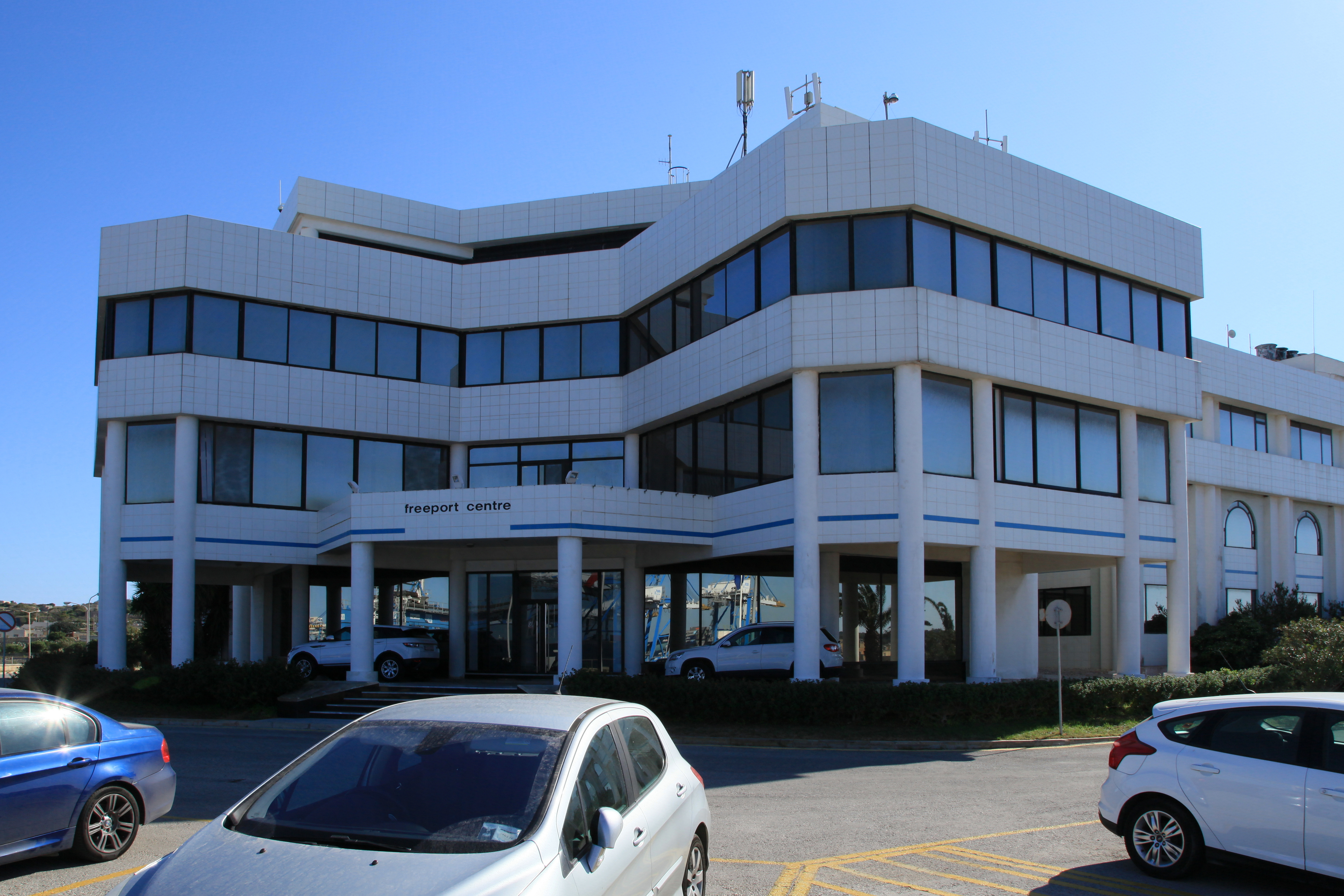
Freeport Centre

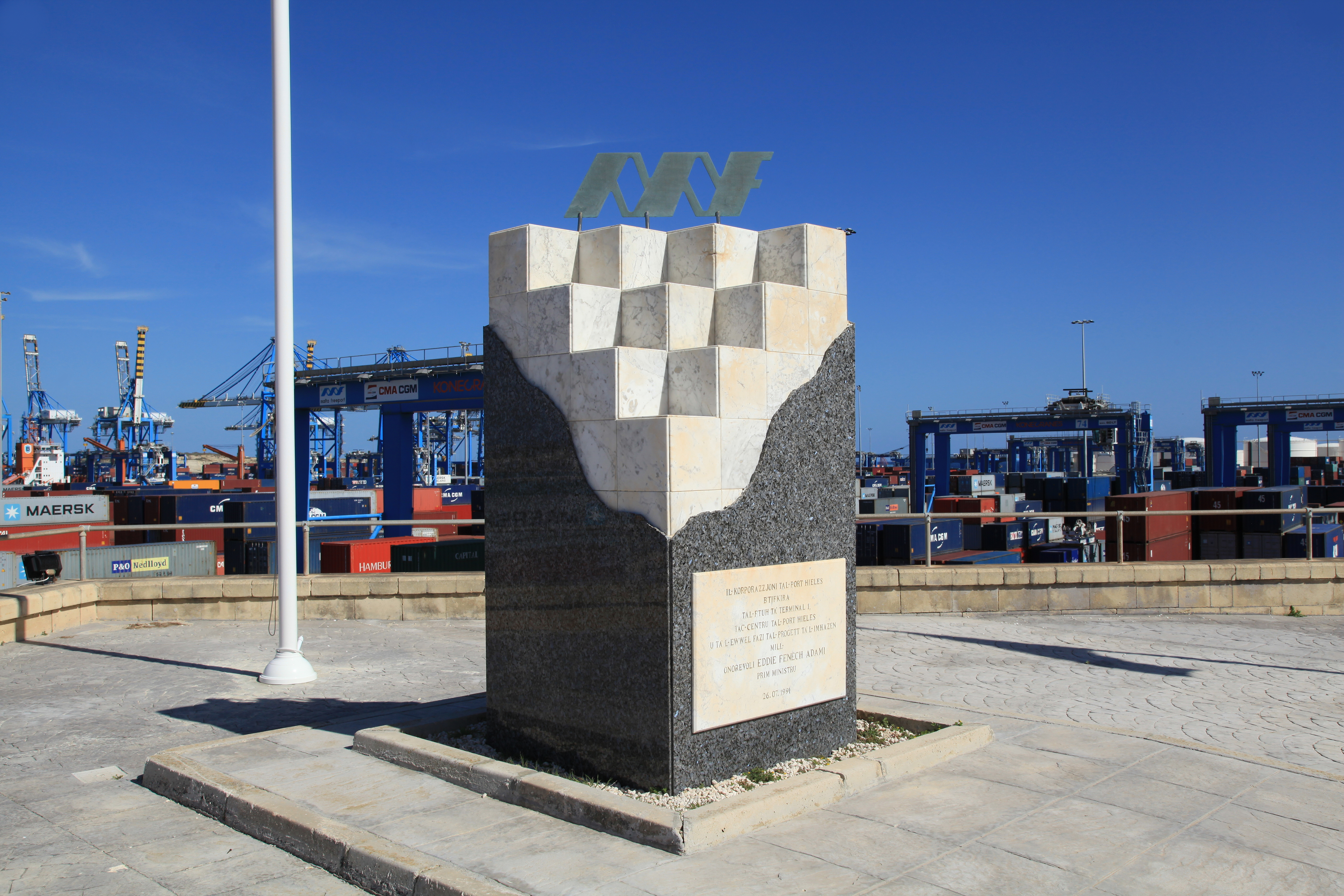
Freeport Monument

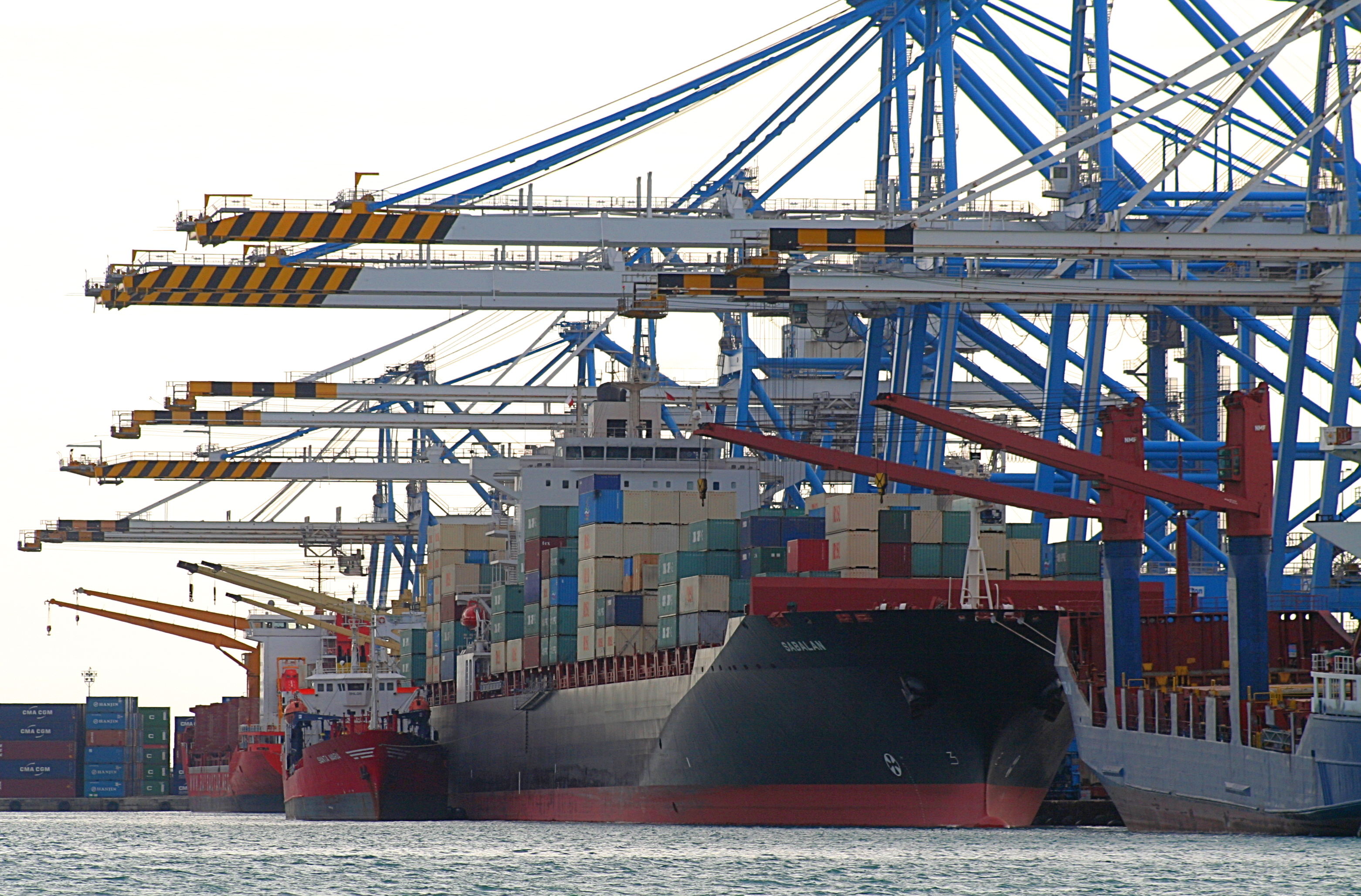

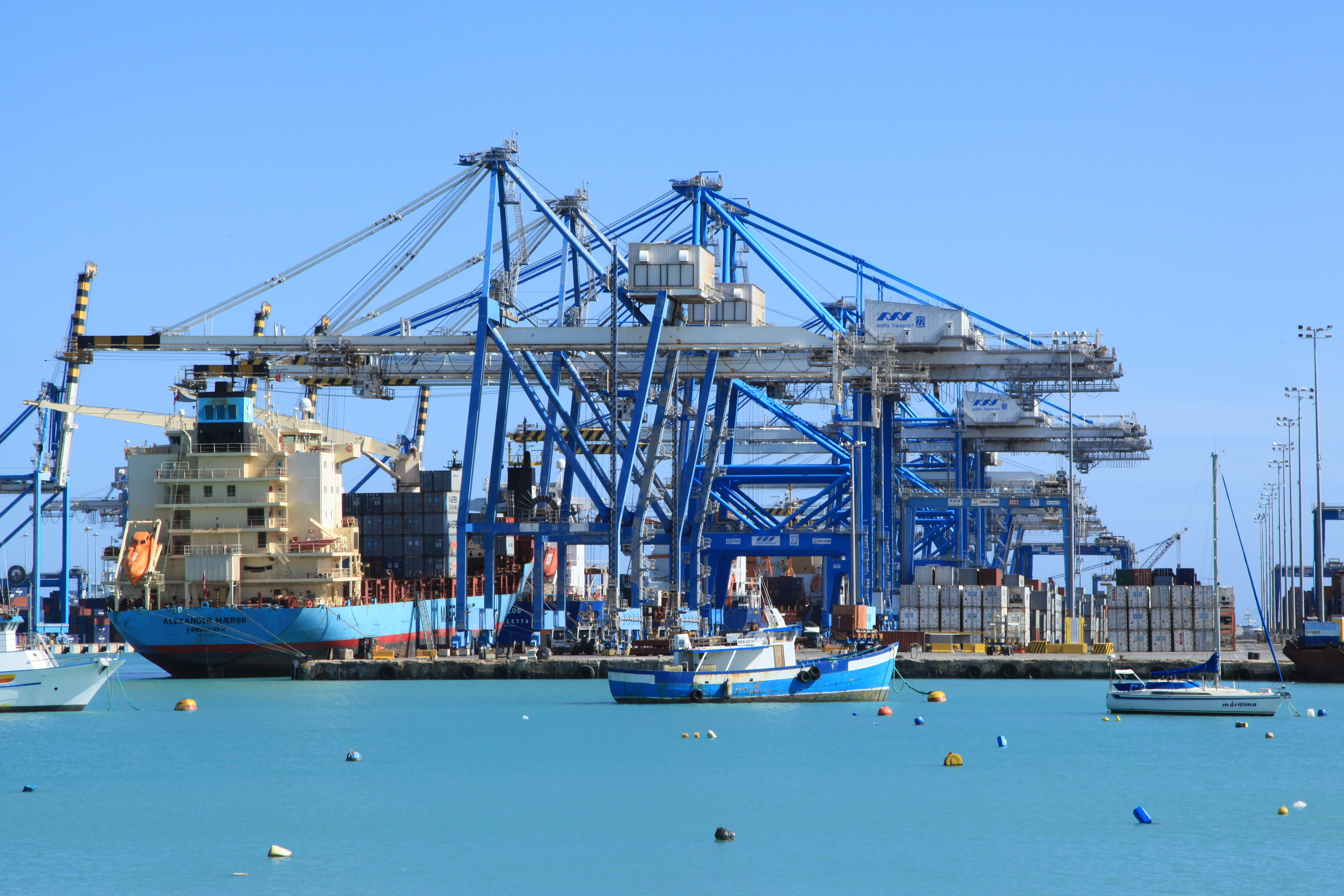

== See also ==
- Grand Harbour
- Marsamxett Harbour
