= St George's Chapel, Birżebbuġa =

St George's Chapel
- Kappella ta' San Ġorġ
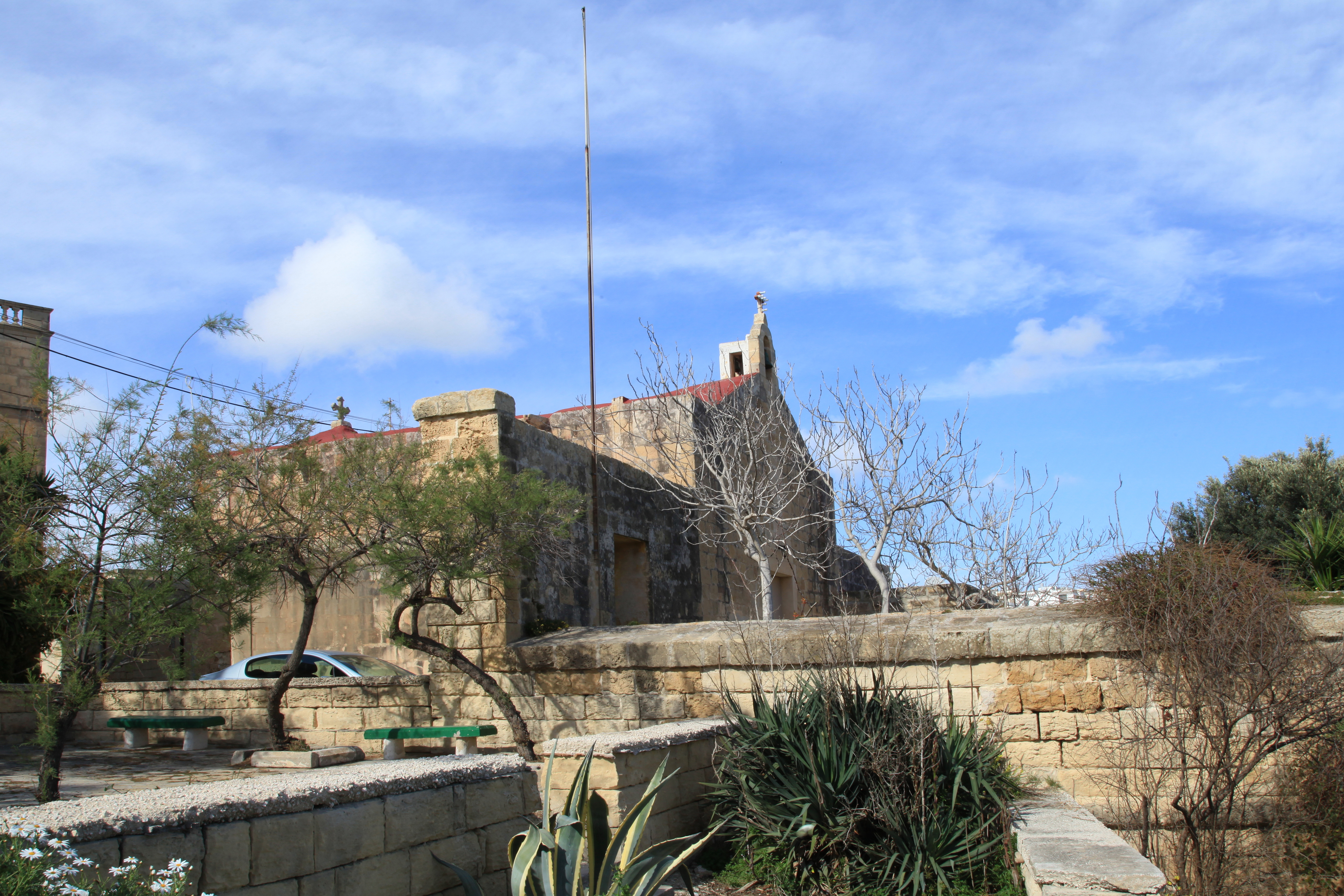

- Location within Malta
- 35°49′52.1″N 14°31′49.4″E
- Location: Birżebbuġa
- Country: Malta
- Denomination: Roman Catholic

History
- Status: Active
- Dedication: Saint George

Architecture
- Functional status: Church

Administration
- Archdiocese: Malta
- Parish: Birżebbuġa

St George's Chapel or the Church of St George the Martyr, is a small Roman Catholic church located in the village of Birżebbuġa, Malta.

== History ==
The origins of the chapel are unknown however it is certain that by 1565 the chapel already existed. 10 years later the chapel was visited by inquisitor Pietro Dusina during his apostolic visit to Malta from Rome. Dusina writes that the chapel had a wooden door and one altar however it did not have a rector neither an income. A feast was celebrated every April 23 in honour of St George by the Parish Priest of Żejtun. In 1621, the Bishop of Malta Baldassare Cagliares visited the chapel and ordered that it be renovated. It was in fact restored by Palmerus Montana. However, by 1659 the chapel was once more abandoned and was subsequently deconsecrated by Bishop Miguel Juan Balaguer Camarasa on April 22, 1659.

It was in 1682 that the chapel was once more restored through the initiative of Gregorio Bonici dei Marchesi Bordino. The chapel was blessed on April 22, 1683, by the parish priest of Żejtun. A redoubt was built around the chapel in 1714–16. By the early 20th century the chapel fell into disuse once more but was restored in 1907.

The chapel bears a sign in Latin stating NON GODE L’IMMUNITA ECCLESIAS, meaning that the church did not offer sanctuary to criminal offenders who sought asylum within the church, something common at that time.

== Interior ==
The chapel has one altar and a painting by an unknown artist depicting St George on his horse slaying the dragon. It is a copy of the one Mattia Preti painted for St John's Co-Cathedral.
