= Saint George Redoubt =

Redoubt in Birżebbuġa, Malta

- Ridott ta' San Ġorġ
- Birżebbuġa, Malta
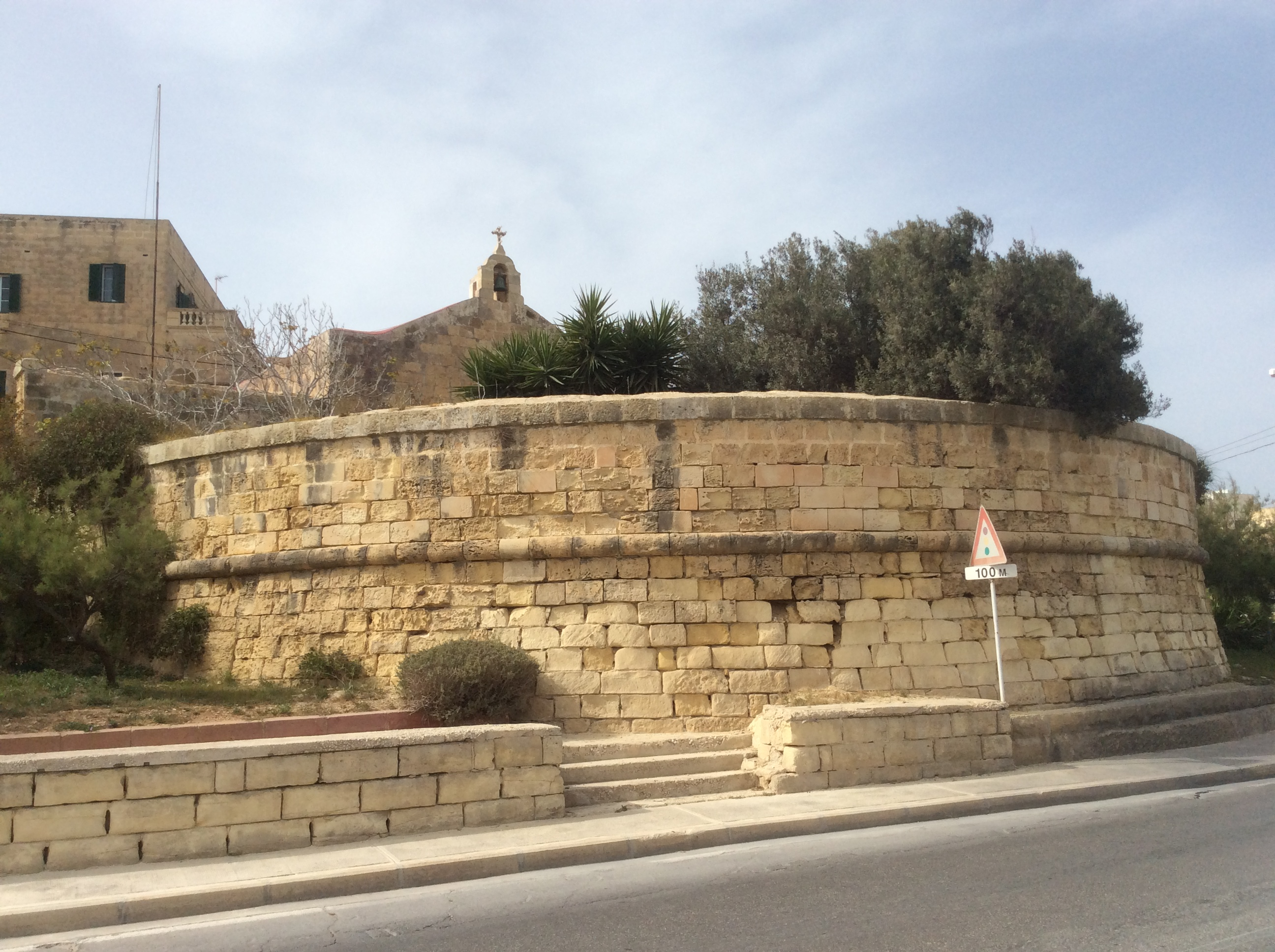
- View of St. George Redoubt

Site information
- Type: Redoubt
- Owner: Archdiocese of Malta
- Controlled by: Missionary Society of St Paul
- Condition: Intact

Location
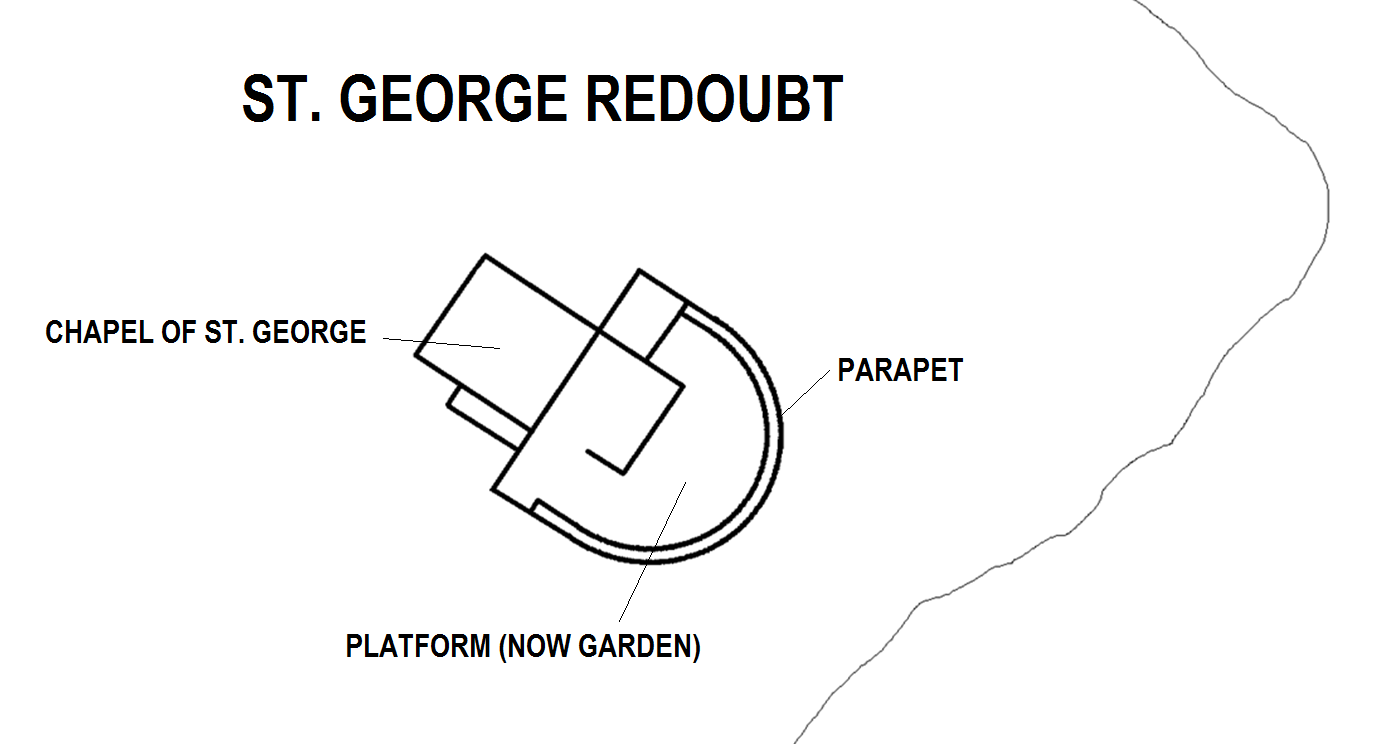
- Map of St. George Redoubt
- Coordinates: 35°49′52″N 14°31′49.7″E

Site history
- Built: 1714–1716
- Built by: Order of Saint John
- Materials: Limestone

Saint George Redoubt (Maltese: Ridott ta' San Ġorġ) is a redoubt in Birżebbuġa, Malta. It was built in 1714–1716 by the Order of Saint John as one of a series of coastal fortifications around the Maltese Islands. It is named after a chapel dedicated to St. George, which was incorporated within the redoubt. The redoubt and chapel still exist and are in good condition.

== History ==
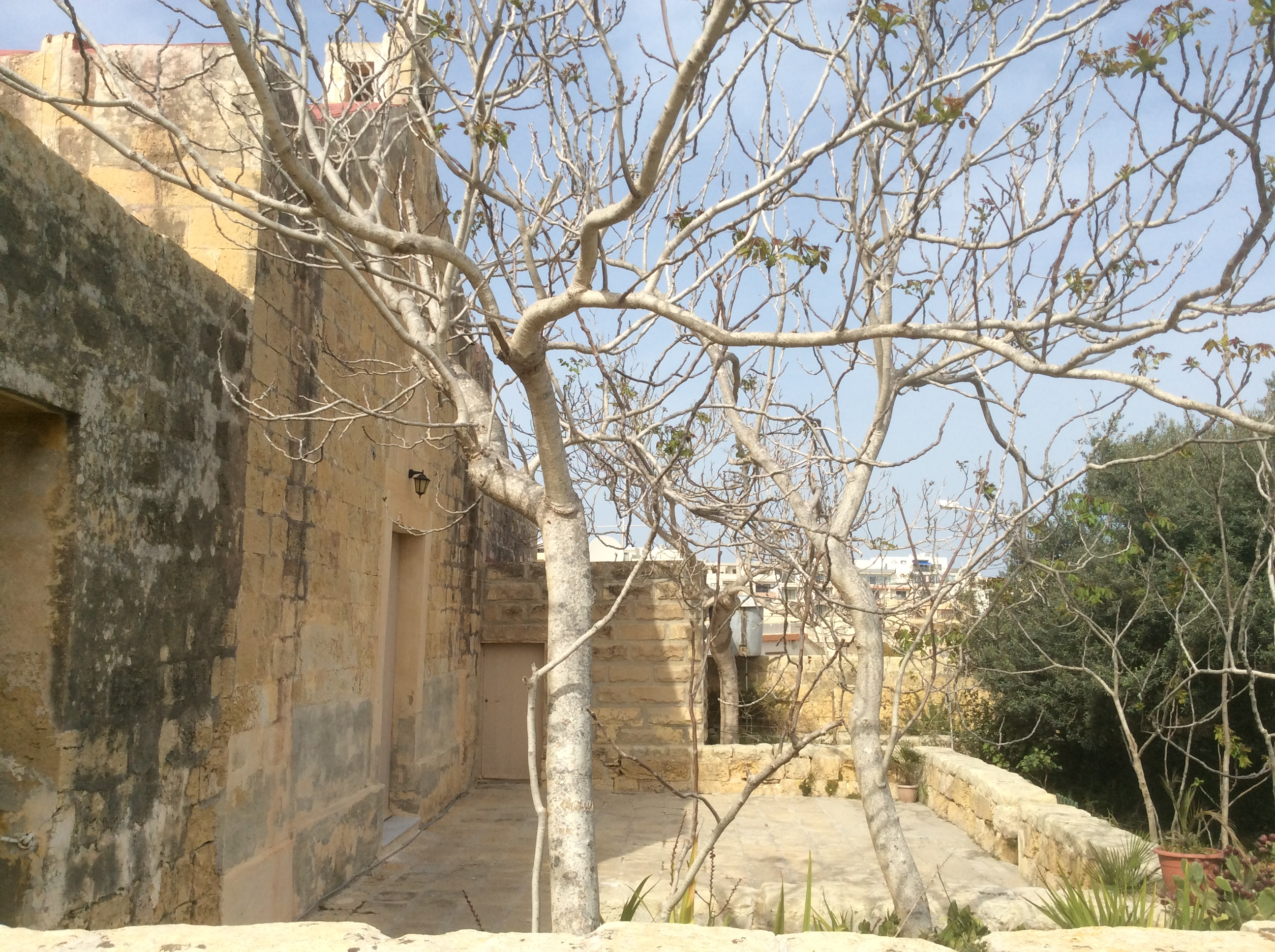
The redoubt's platform, with the chapel to the left

The site has been inhabited since the Bronze Age and silos of the period are still found at the coast next to the redoubt.

Saint George Redoubt was built in 1714–1716 as part of the first building programme of coastal batteries in Malta. It was part of a chain of fortifications that defended Marsaxlokk Bay, which also included three other redoubts, the large Saint Lucian Tower, two smaller De Redin towers, seven batteries and three entrenchments.

The redoubt was built on the site of a cemetery. It incorporated the Chapel of St. George, which had been built in 1683 on the site of an earlier chapel. Apart from being the only Hospitaller redoubt incorporating a church, St. George Redoubt is also unusual since it has a semi-circular shape, while most redoubts were pentagonal. The semi-circular platform is ringed by a low parapet. The walls linking the redoubt to the church are pierced by musketry loopholes, while the doorway had a ditch and a drawbridge.

Sometime after 1741, two fougasses were excavated behind the redoubt. They are now located within private houses.

== Present day ==
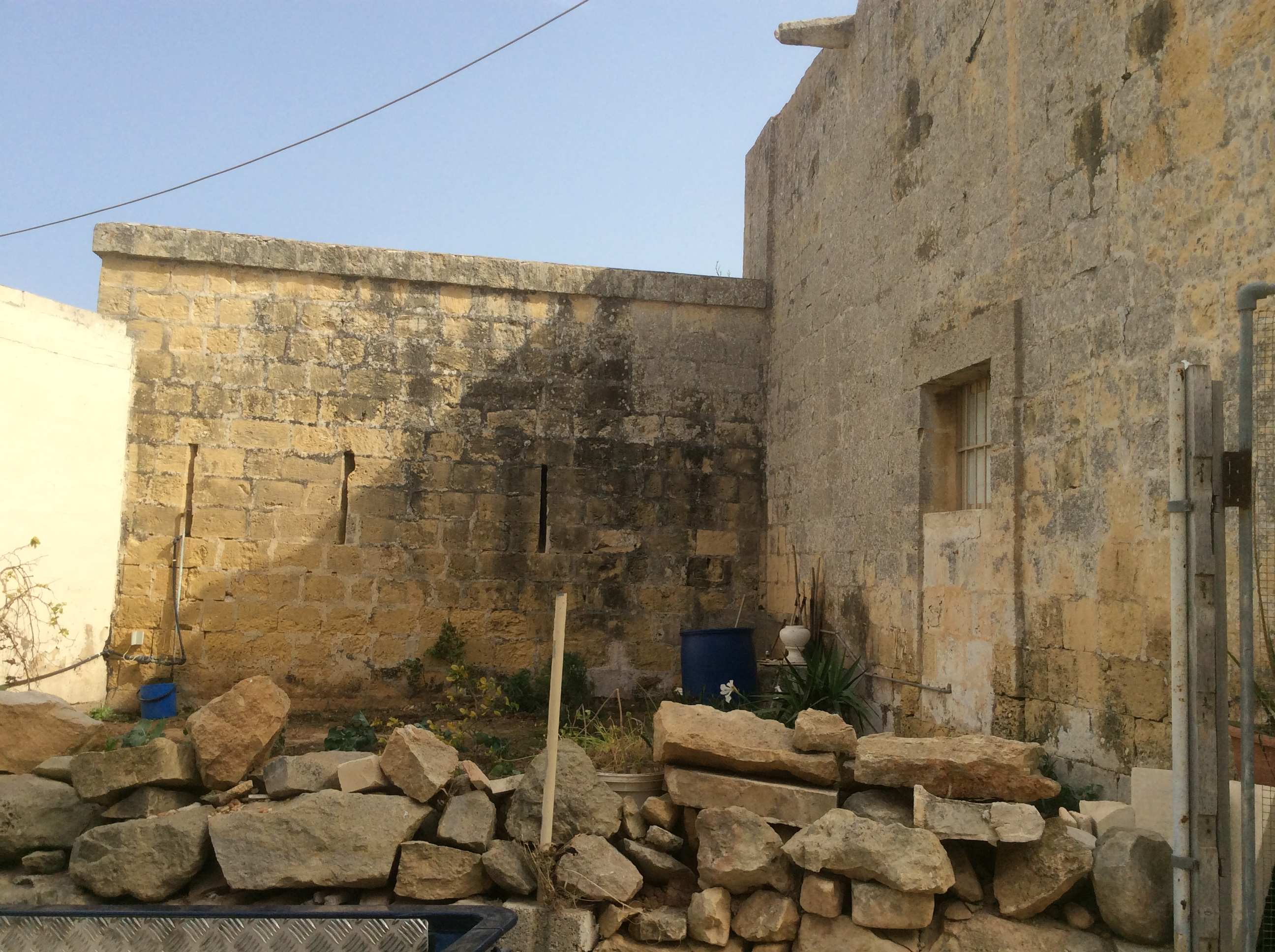
Musketry loopholes

Today, the chapel and redoubt are managed by the Missionary Society of St Paul. They are both in good condition, and are listed on the National Inventory of the Cultural Property of the Maltese Islands.
