= Latnija Cave =

Prehistoric monument in Malta

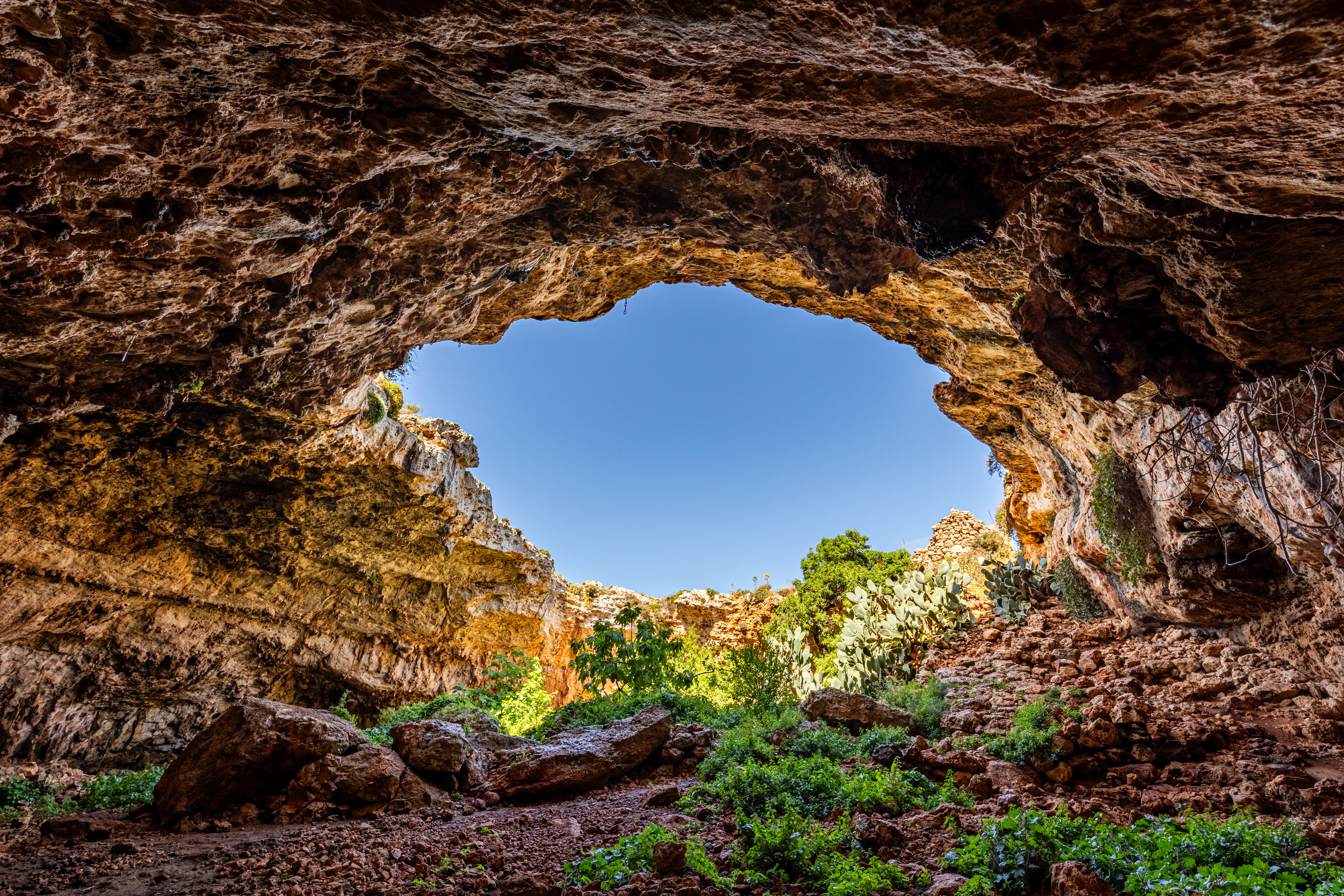
- View from within the Latnija doline

- Map of Malta showing the location of Latnija Cave
- 35°58′39″N 14°19′43″E
- Type: Cave (Doline)
- Periods: Mesolithic
- Location: Mellieħa, Malta

Site notes
- Excavation dates: 2021–2023
- Archaeologists: Eleanor Scerri, Nicholas Vella

Latnija Cave (Maltese: Għar tal-Latnija) is a limestone cave and archaeological site near Mellieħa on the north coast of the island of Malta. It has received international attention as the first and only site at which Mesolithic activity has been recognised anywhere in the Maltese archipelago. The earliest strata have been assigned to around 8.5 kya (6500 BC), with occupation of the site lasting for roughly a thousand years. Evidence at the site suggests that local hunters primarily exploited large land animals, particularly red deer, but also utilized marine resources such as limpets.
