= Fort Tas-Silġ =

Polygonal fort in Marsaxlokk, Malta

- Il-Fortizza tas-Silġ
- Marsaxlokk, Malta
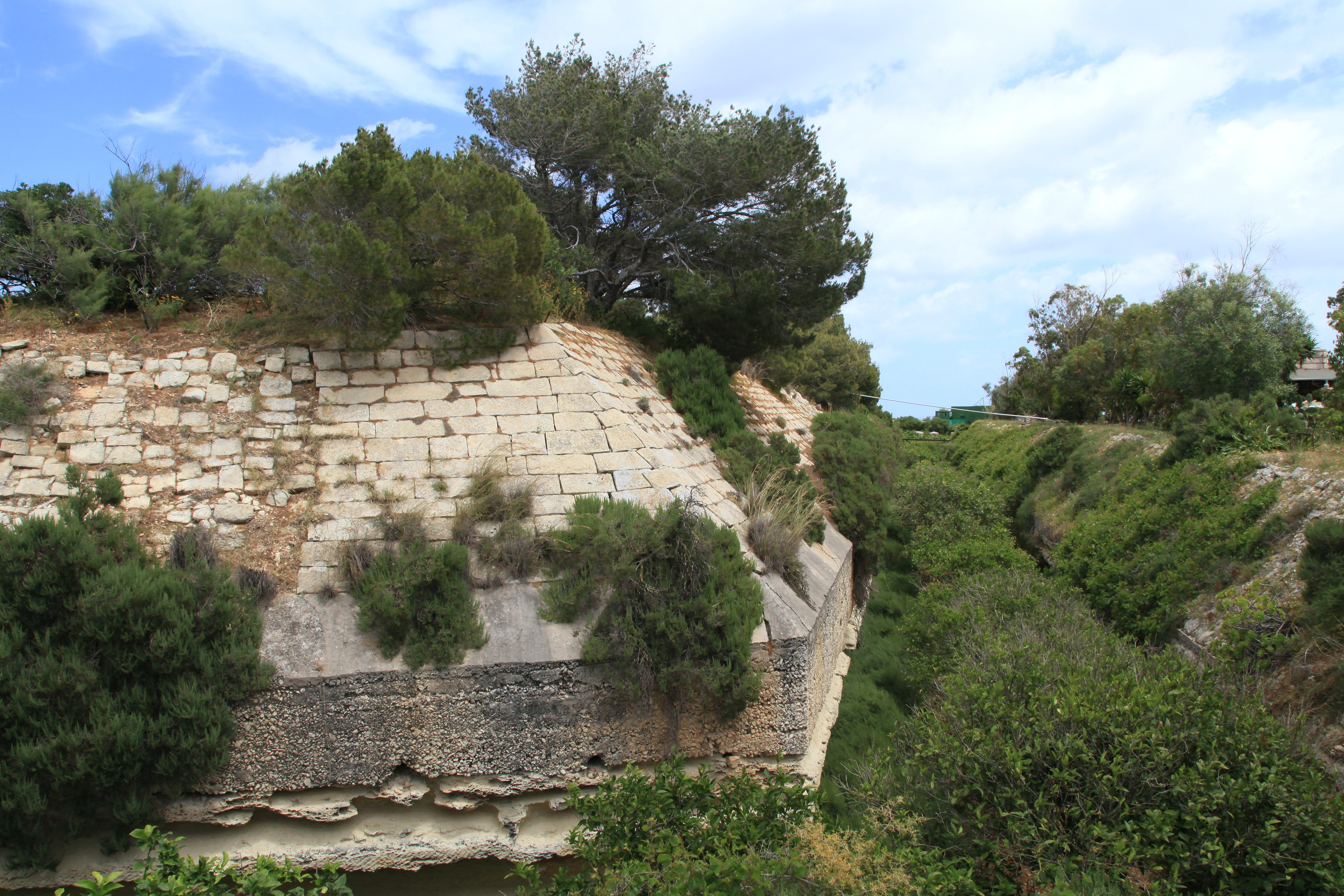
- Fort Tas-Silġ

Site information
- Type: Polygonal fort
- Owner: Government of Malta
- Controlled by: The Island Sanctuary
- Open to the public: No
- Condition: Intact but neglected

Location
- Coordinates: 35°50′24″N 14°33′25″E
- Area: 60,000 m^{2} (650,000 sq ft)

Site history
- Built: 1879–1883
- Built by: British Empire
- In use: 1883–1960
- Materials: Limestone and Concrete

Fort Tas-Silġ (formerly written as Fort Ta Silc, Maltese: Il-Fortizza tas-Silġ) is a polygonal fort in Marsaxlokk, Malta. It was built between 1879 and 1883 by the British on high ground at the shoreward end of Delimara Point, above il-Ħofra-ż-Żgħira. Its primary function was as a fire control point controlling the massed guns of Fort Delimara on the headland below.

It was part of a chain of fortifications intended to protect Marsaxlokk Harbour, along with Fort Delimara seaward along Delimara point, the north arm of Marsaxlokk Bay, Fort San Lucian on Kbira point in the middle of the bay, Fort Benghisa on Bengħisa Point, and the Pinto and Ferretti batteries on the shores of the bay.

Approximately 300 metres north of Fort Tas-Silġ is the Saint Paul's Battery, a much smaller polygonal style fortification, that is in much worse condition.

== History ==
The first stone of Fort Tas-Silġ was laid down in 1879 after a suggestion by British military engineers, and it was completed in 1883. The fort is a classic example of a polygonal fort, and it had underground barracks and magazines, and a spacious parade ground. The fort is surrounded by a ditch, and the entrance was protected with gun ports on one side and a bridge leading to the door.

The fort's design and location was criticized by a number of military engineers, and its armament of six RML 64 pounder 64 cwt guns was changed a number of times before being removed in 1903.

In the 1950s, the fort was used by the RAF (100 Signals Unit). During this time the camp mascot was a dog named Dodger. Later, the dog Rusty and bitch Scrubber were pets on the unit. Scrubber gave birth to 14 puppies, all of which found homes elsewhere on Malta. One of the three Aerials on the camp was used in the 1953 war film Malta Story.

The fort was finally decommissioned and handed to civilian authorities in 1960.

=== Present day ===
Since 1991, the fort has been rented to the Island Sanctuary as a refuge for dogs. The sanctuary pays the government an annual rent of €232 for use of the fort.

The gatehouse, and the shoreward ditch are in fair repair, but there has been considerable collapse of the inner face of the north ditch.

In 2015, the fort was shortlisted as a possible site for the campus of the proposed American University of Malta. It was not chosen, and the campus is to be split up between Dock No. 1 in Cospicua and Żonqor Point in Marsaskala.

== Gallery ==
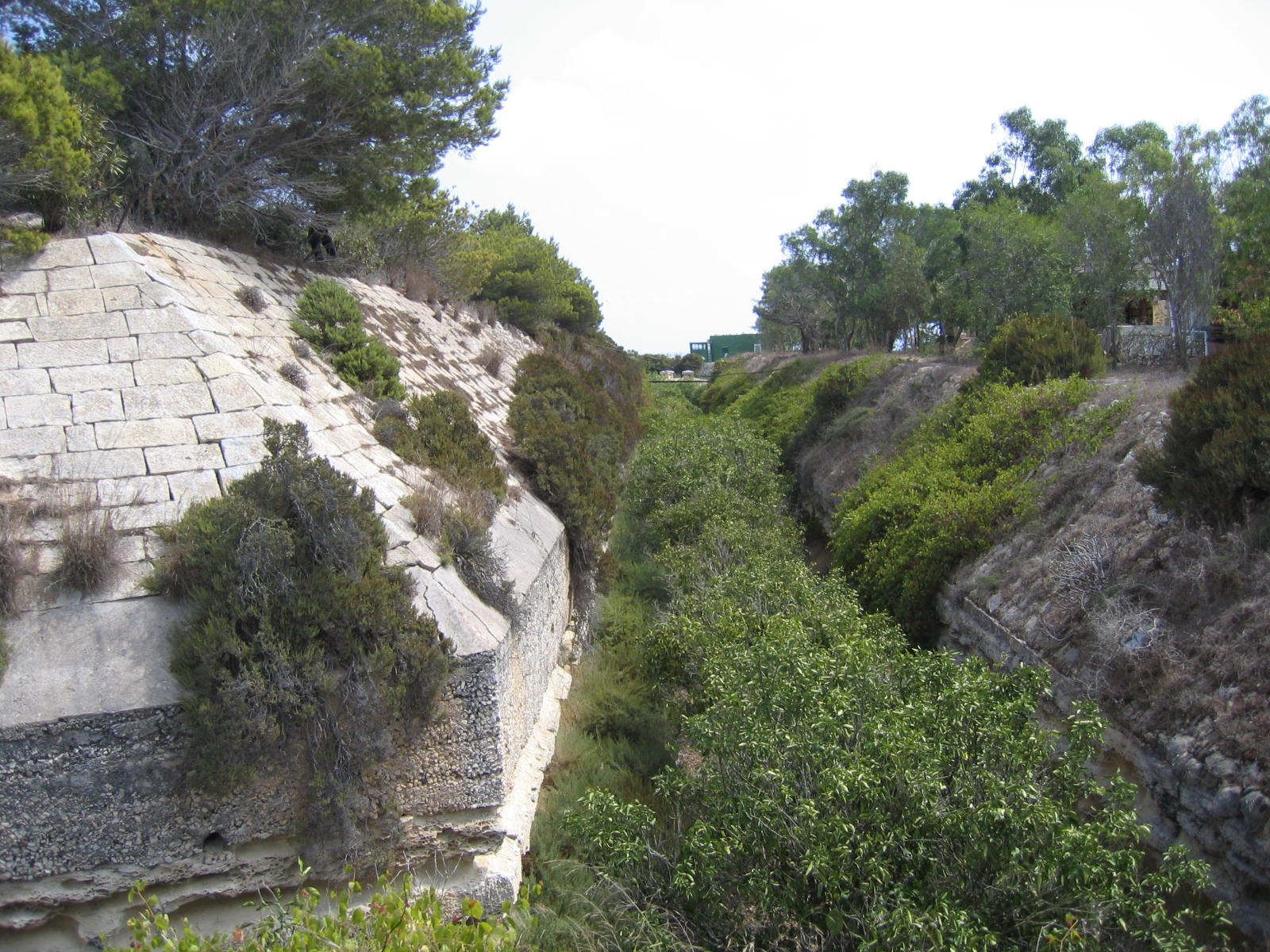
Scarp and ditch

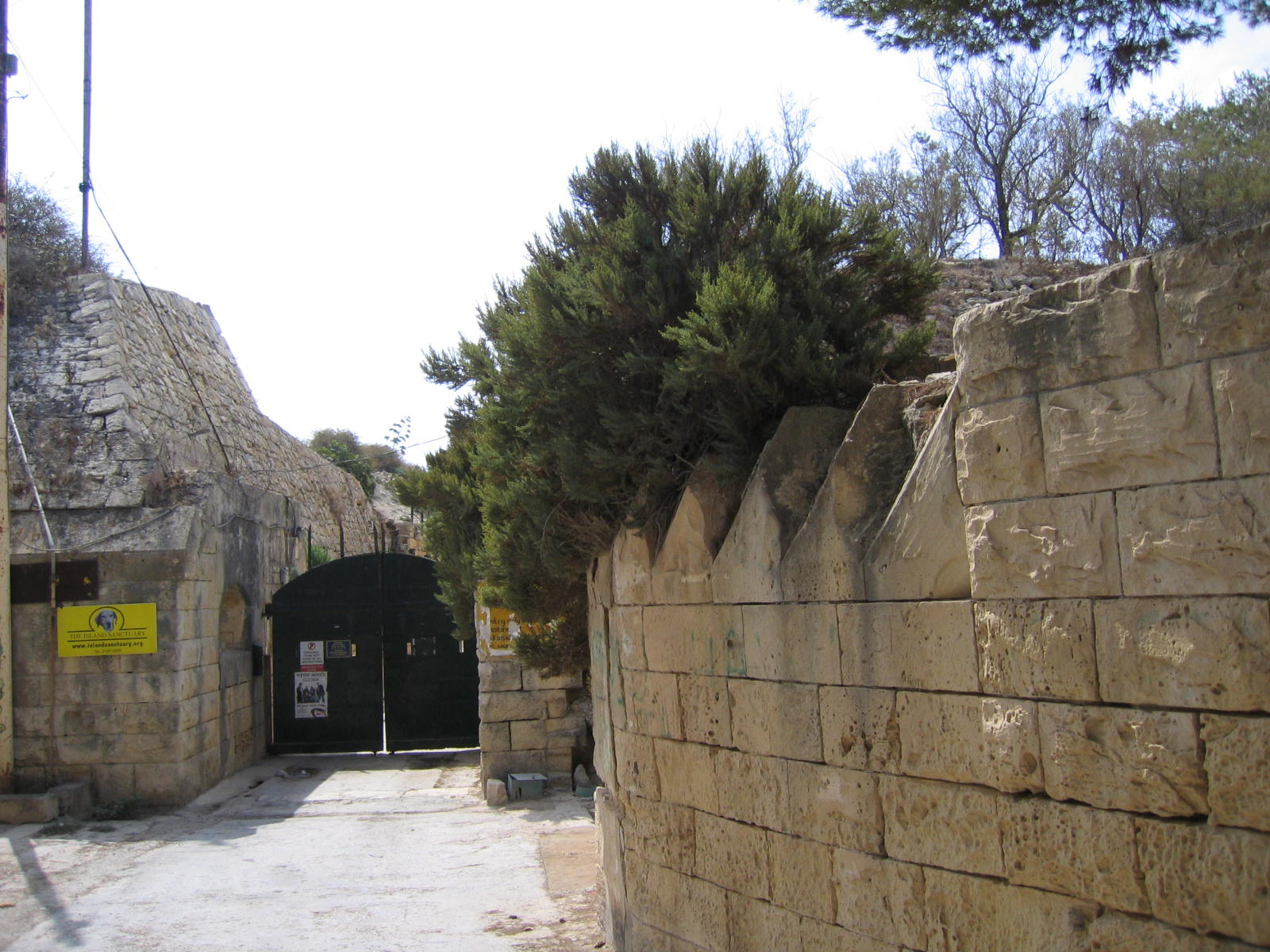
Gatehouse and approach ramp

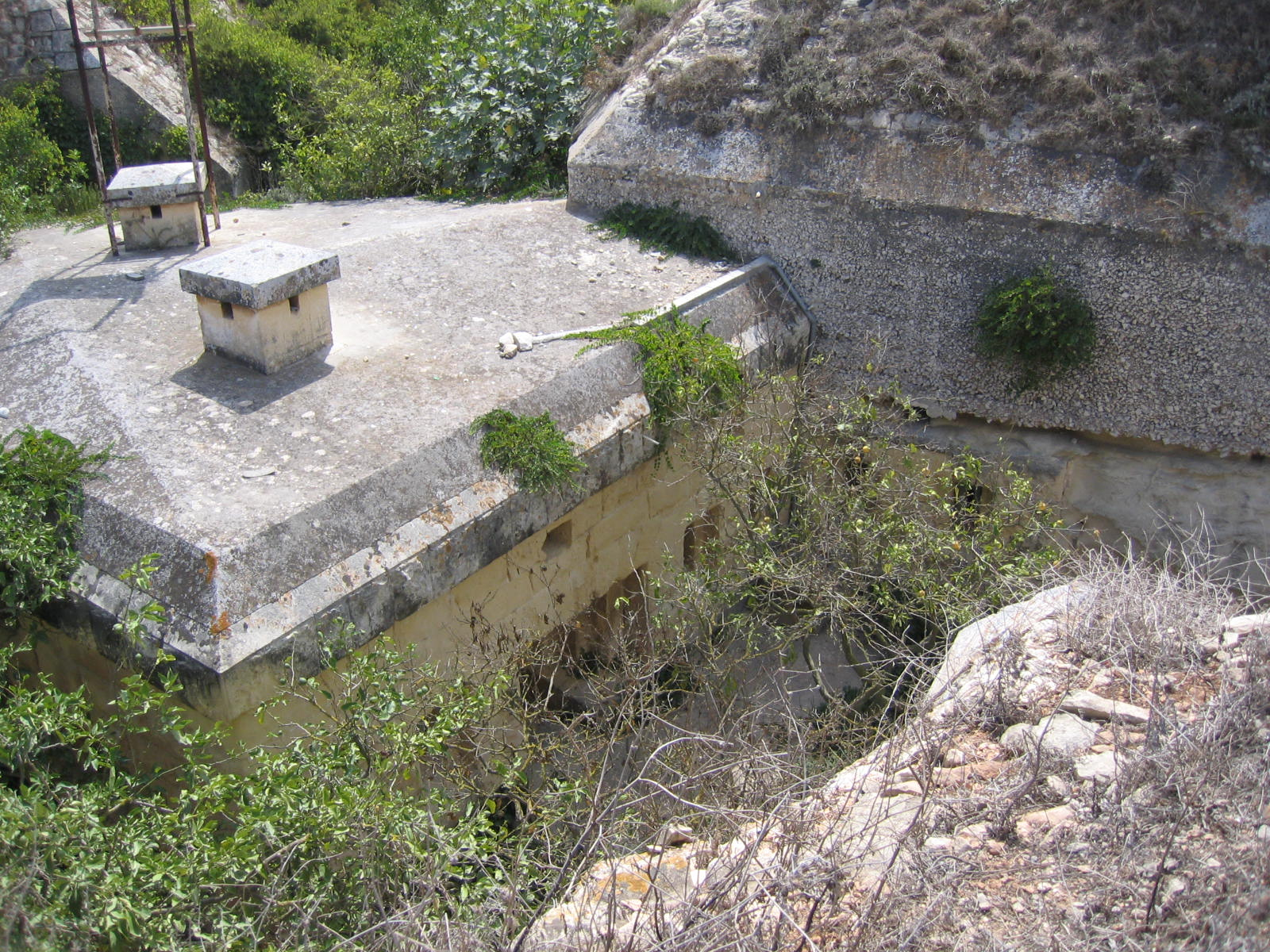
Caponier

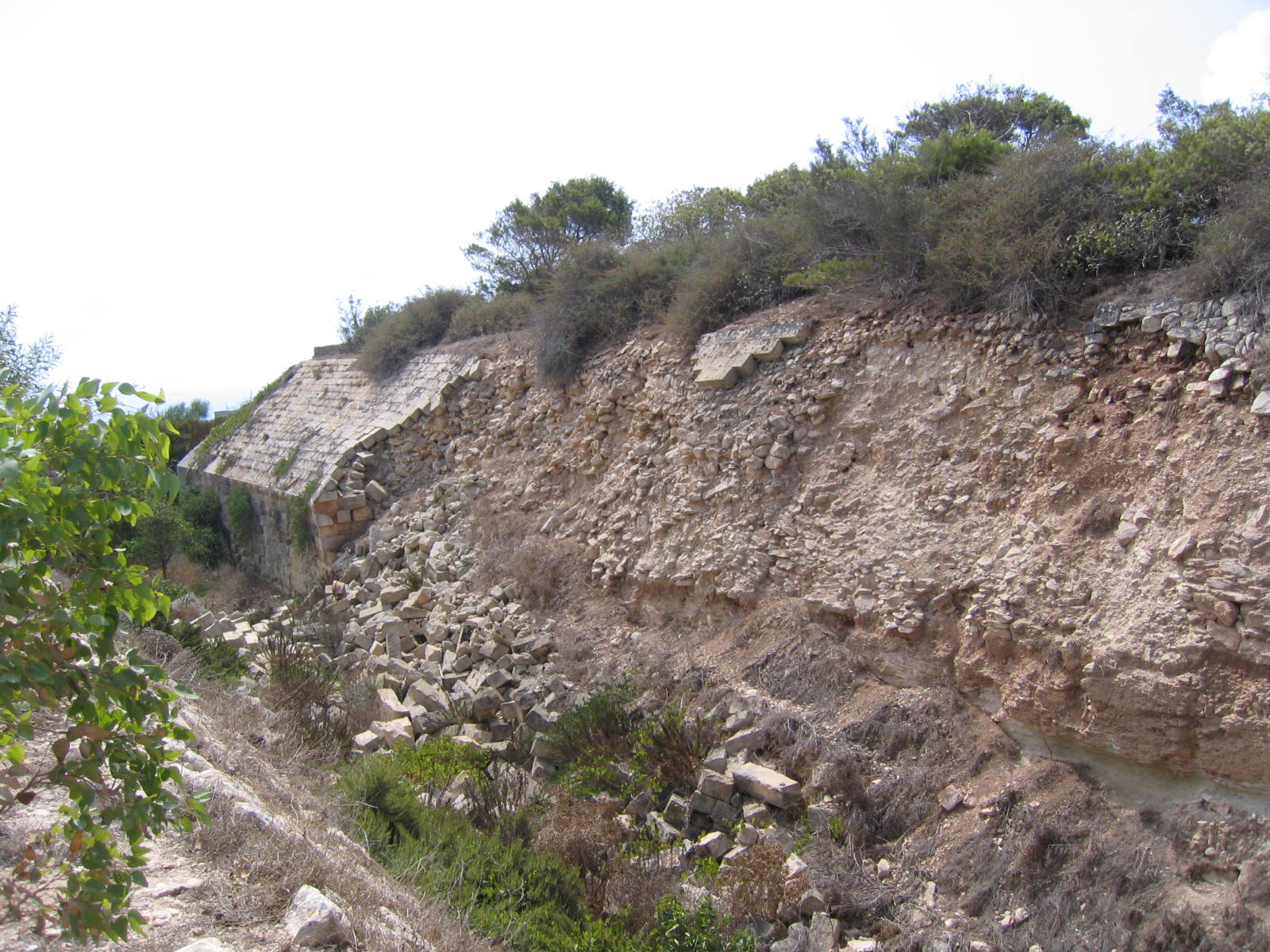
Scarp collapse

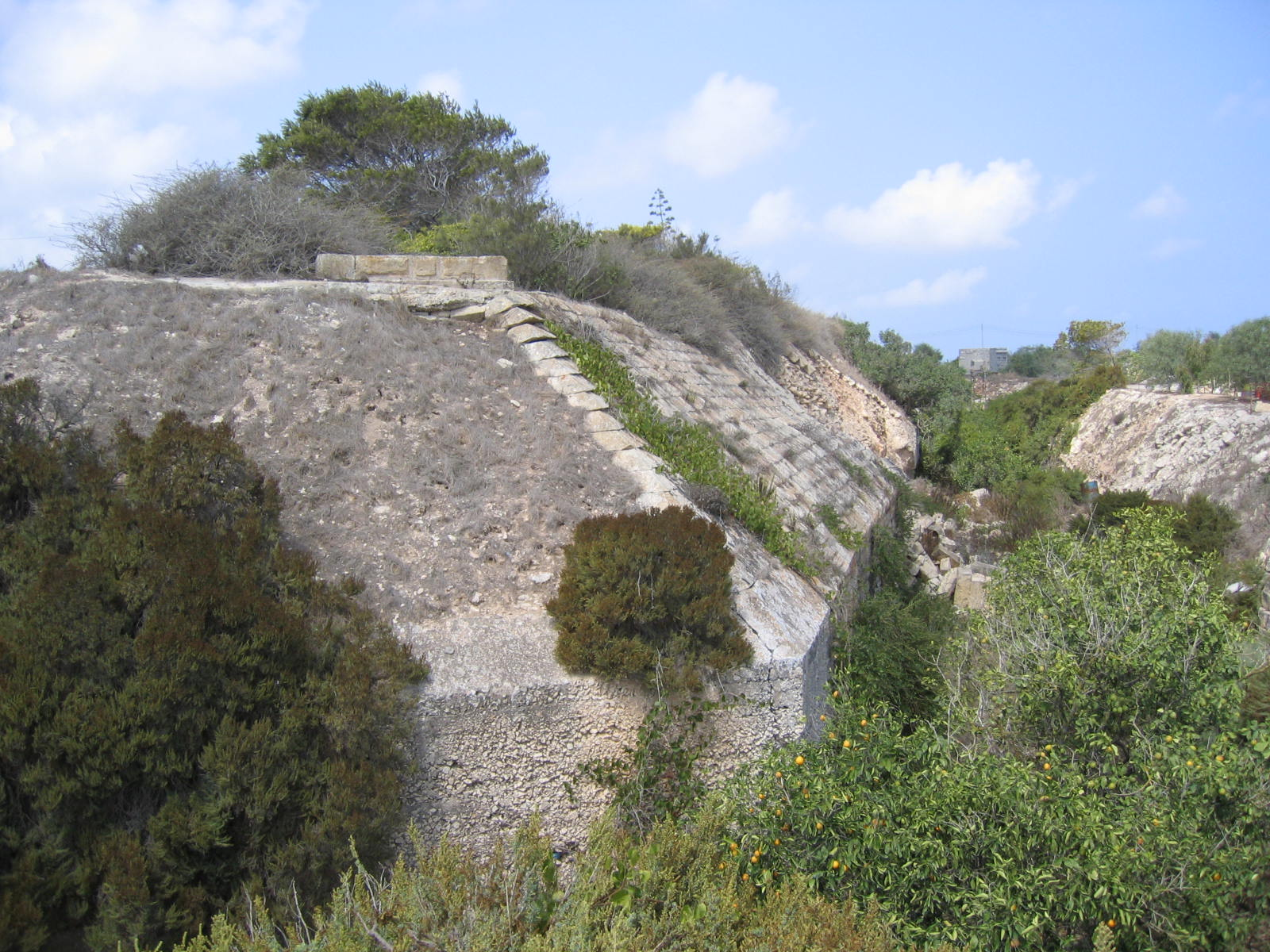
Scarp and ditch

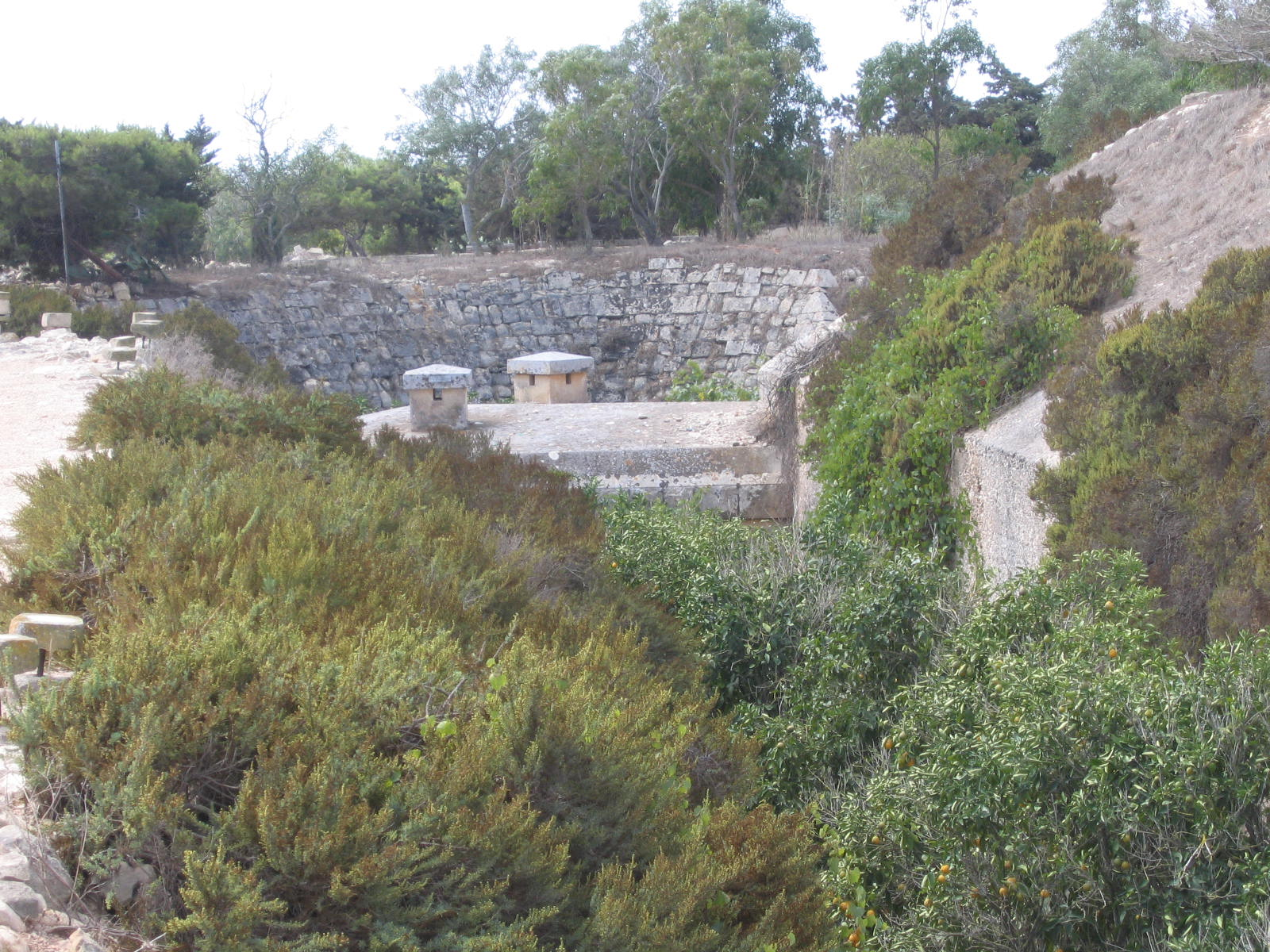
Ditch counterscarp and caponier

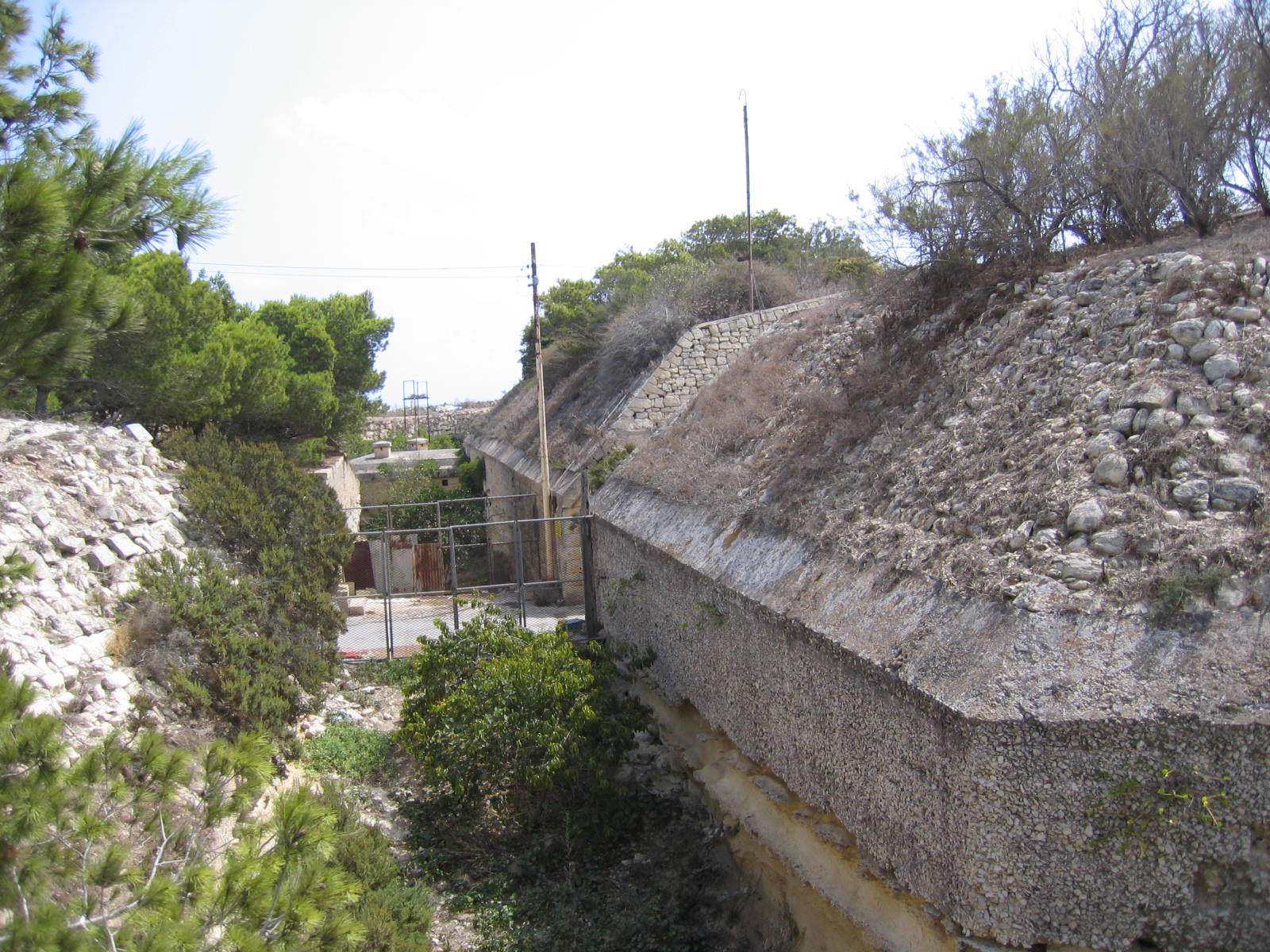
Gatehouse ditch

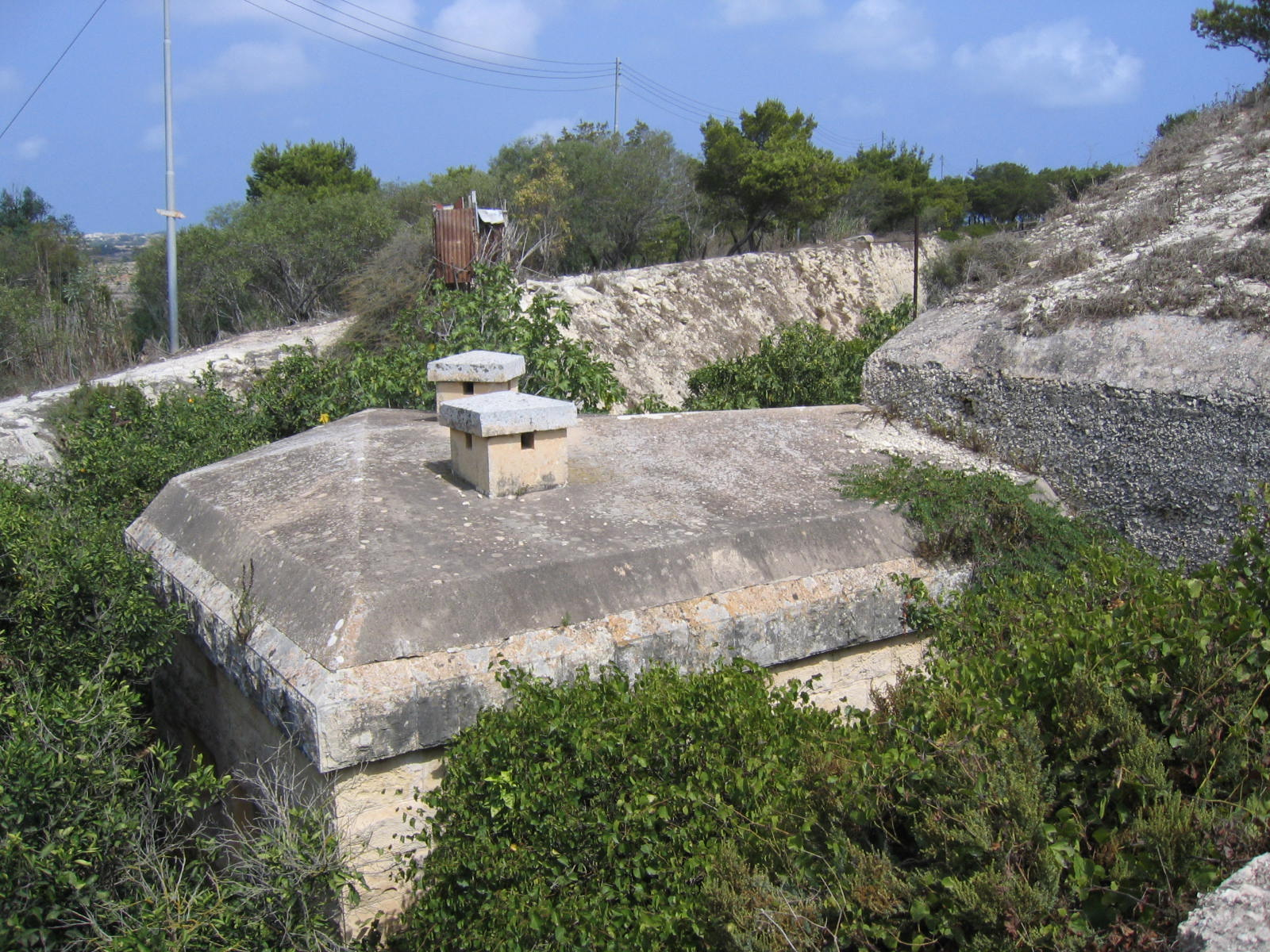
Caponier

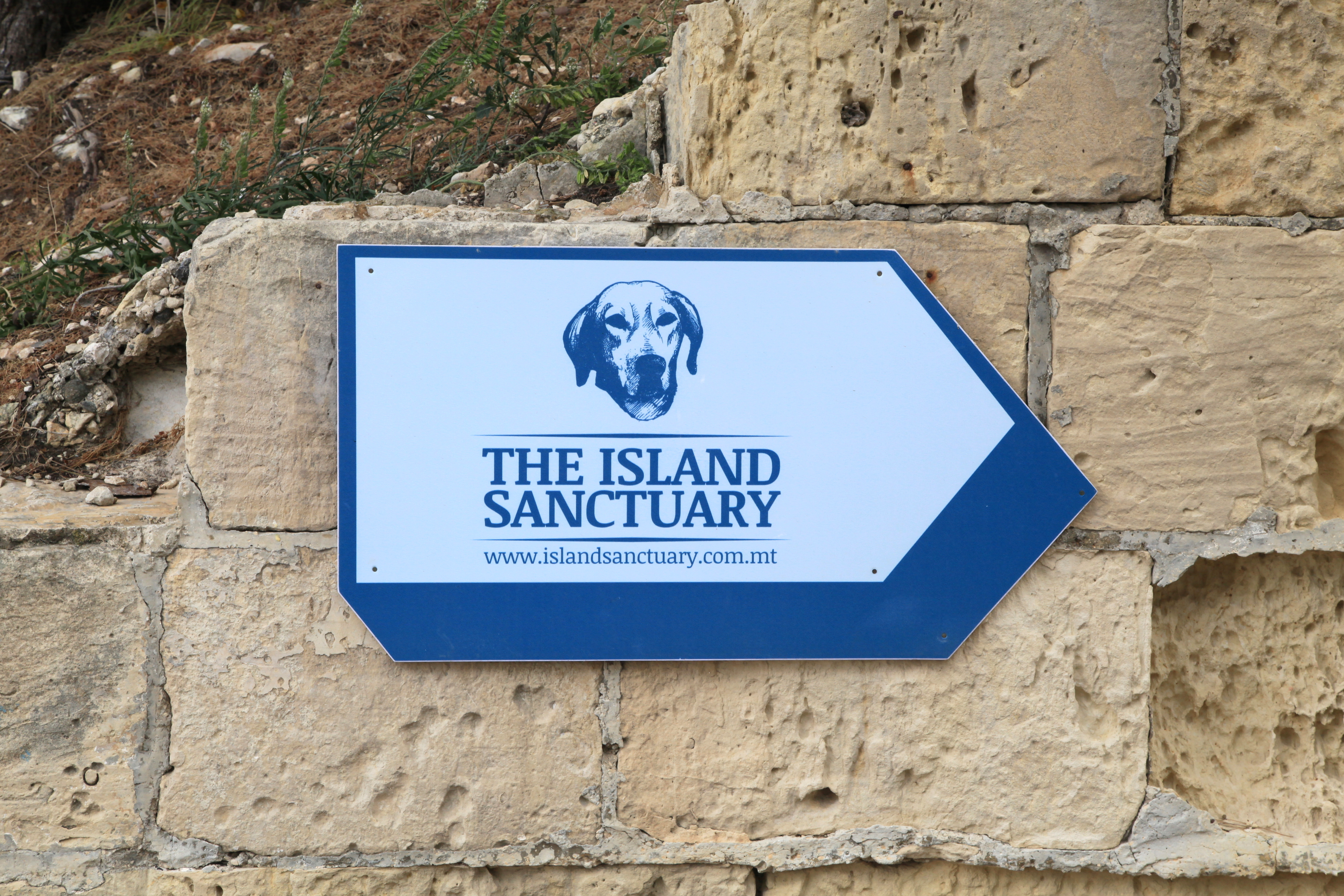
The Island Sanctuary sign

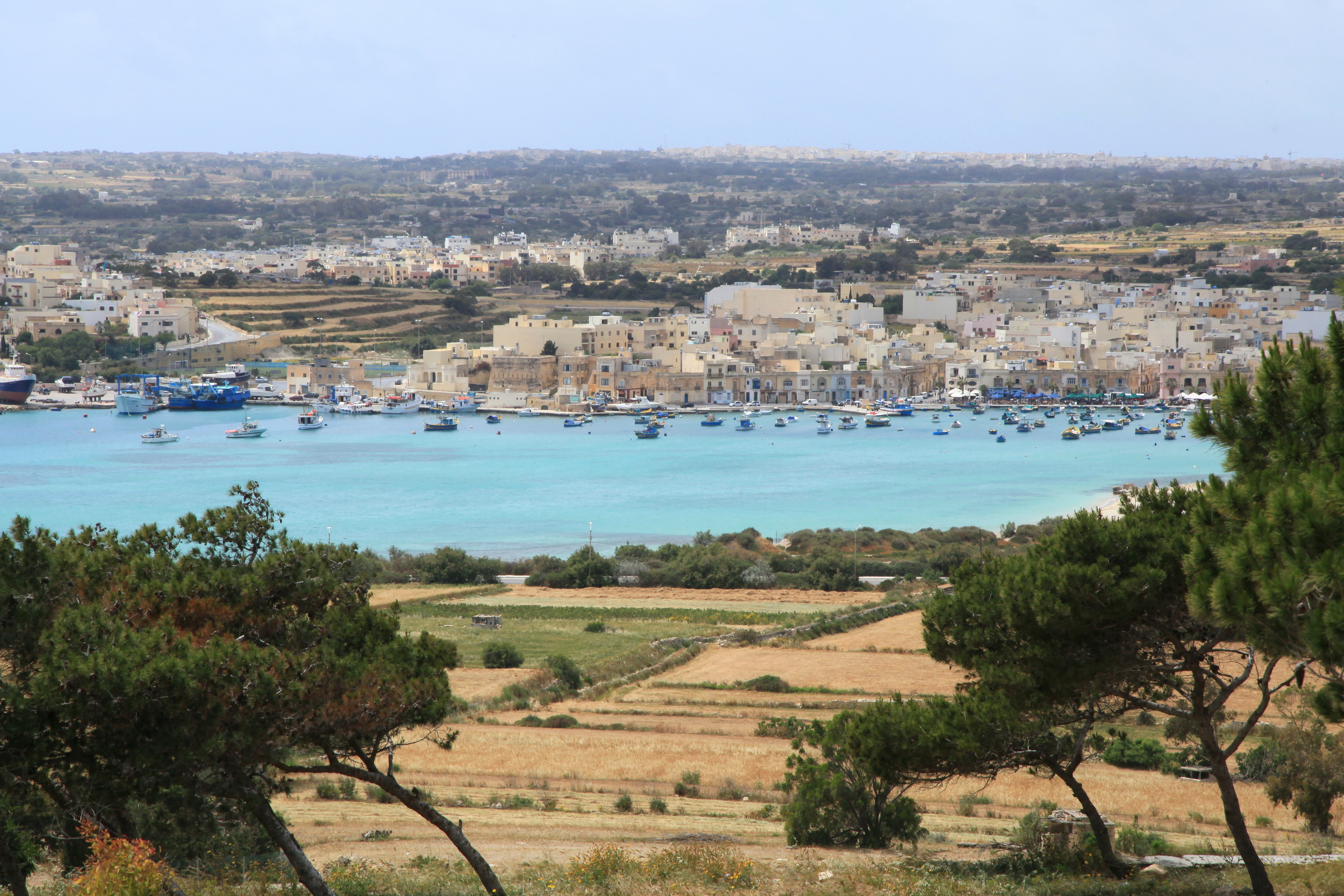
View from the fort
