= Fort Delimara =

Historical fort in Marsaxlokk, Malta

- Il-Fortizza ta' Delimara
- Marsaxlokk, Malta
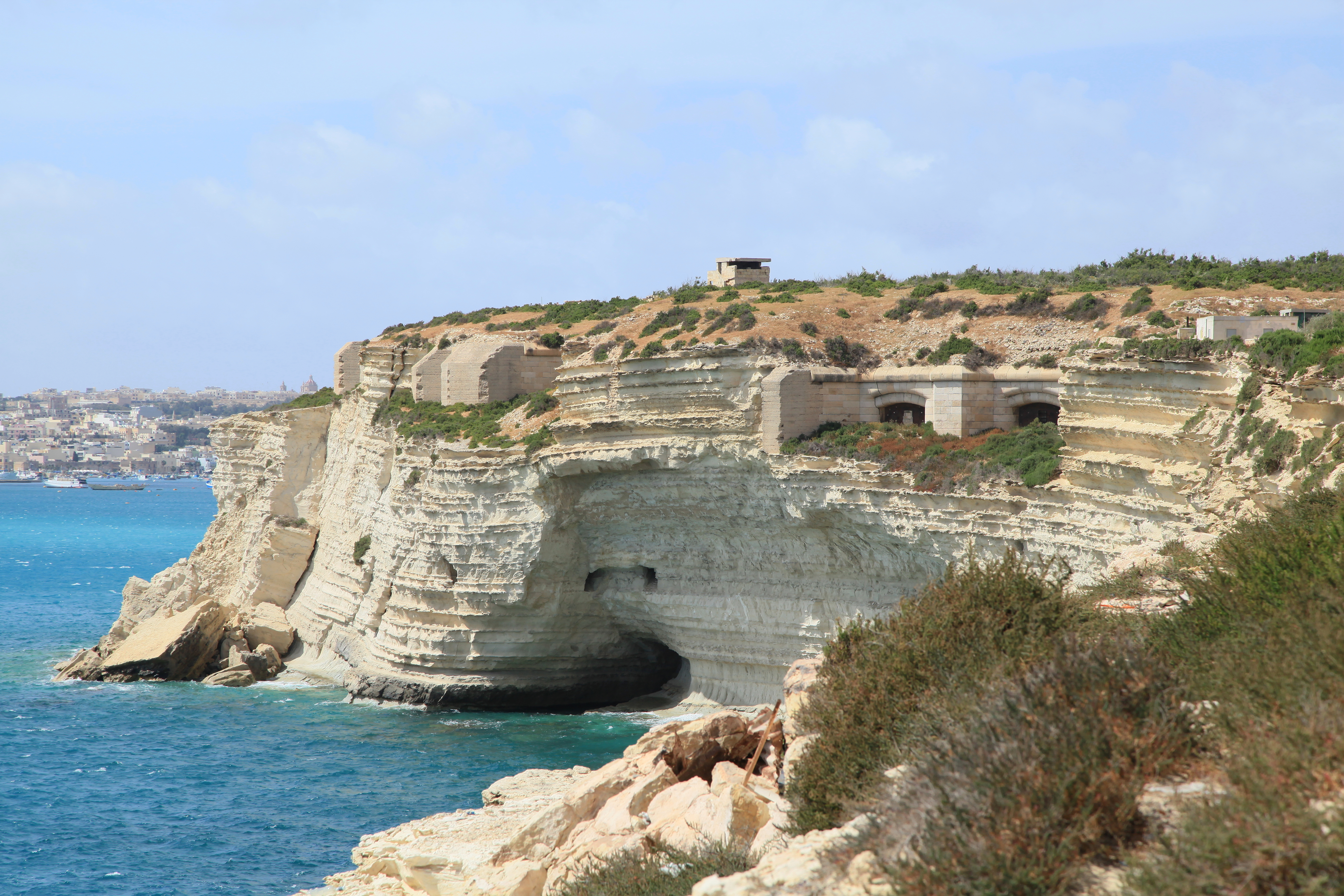
- Casemates of Fort Delimara

Site information
- Type: Polygonal fort
- Owner: Government of Malta
- Controlled by: Heritage Malta
- Open to the public: No
- Condition: Intact but in danger of collapse

Location
- Coordinates: 35°49′26″N 14°33′27″E
- Area: 24,000 m^{2} (260,000 sq ft)

Site history
- Built: 1876–1888
- Built by: British Empire
- In use: 1880s–1950s
- Materials: Limestone and Concrete

Fort Delimara (Maltese: Il-Fortizza ta' Delimara) is a polygonal fort in Marsaxlokk, Malta. It was built between 1876 and 1888 by the British as part of a chain of fortifications intended to protect Marsaxlokk Harbour. Today, the fort is still intact but is in need of restoration, and is in danger of collapse due to coastal erosion.

== History ==
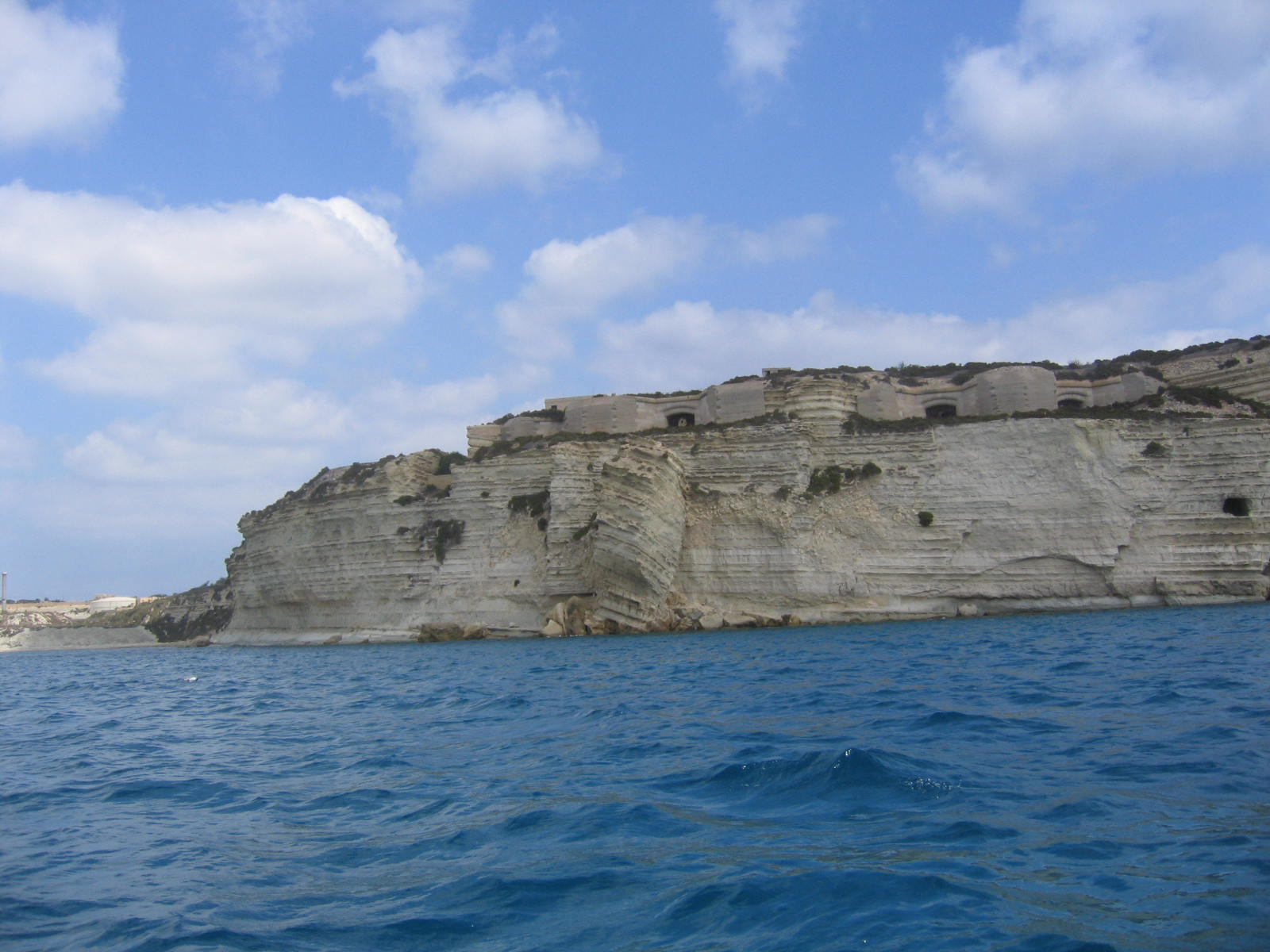
Fort Delimara from Marsaxlokk Bay

The fort was built between 1876 and 1878 by the British. The main gate carries a date of 1881, but this is the date of completion of the gatehouse, not the commissioning of the fort.

Fort Delimara was one of a ring of forts and batteries that protected Marsaxlokk harbour, along with Fort Tas-Silġ at the shoreward end of Delimara point, Fort San Lucian on Kbira point in the middle of Marsaxlokk bay, Fort Benghisa on Benghisa Point, and the Pinto and Ferreti batteries on the shores of Marsaxlokk Bay.

The nearby 17th century Delimara Tower was demolished to clear Fort Delimara's line of fire.

On 29 March 1903, defective bombs, which were stored at Fort Delimara prior to being disposed of, accidentally detonated after children tampered with a bomb in an attempt to open it, killing four.

In 1956 the fort was stripped of the majority of its artillery. Soon after, the fort was abandoned for a considerable period, and in 1975 it was leased by the Government of Malta to a local farmer, who used it to raise pigs from 1982 to 2005.

After protracted negotiations, ownership of Fort Delimara was transferred to Heritage Malta on 11 August 2005. The agency pays an annual rent of €764 to the government for the fort. Despite being a pigs farm and a considerable amount of modern debris, the fort still retains four of its original complement of fourteen Victorian 12.5-inch 38 ton rifled muzzle-loading guns mounted on dwarf carriages.

The site is in a derelict condition and is under the responsibility of Heritage Malta. There are plans to restore the fort and open it as a museum, but nothing materialized so far. It is currently not open to the public.

== Layout ==
Fort Delimara is mostly underground, with the fort's main armament mounted in casemates set in the cliffs on the shoreward face of Delimara Point. At the surface it is a polygonal fort, hexagonal in outline, with rock cut ditches on four sides, and the gently curving vertical cliff forming the convex fifth and sixth sides. Ventilation apertures and access passageways are spread out across the face of the cliff, and even out onto the seaward face of Delimara Point.

=== Gatehouse ===
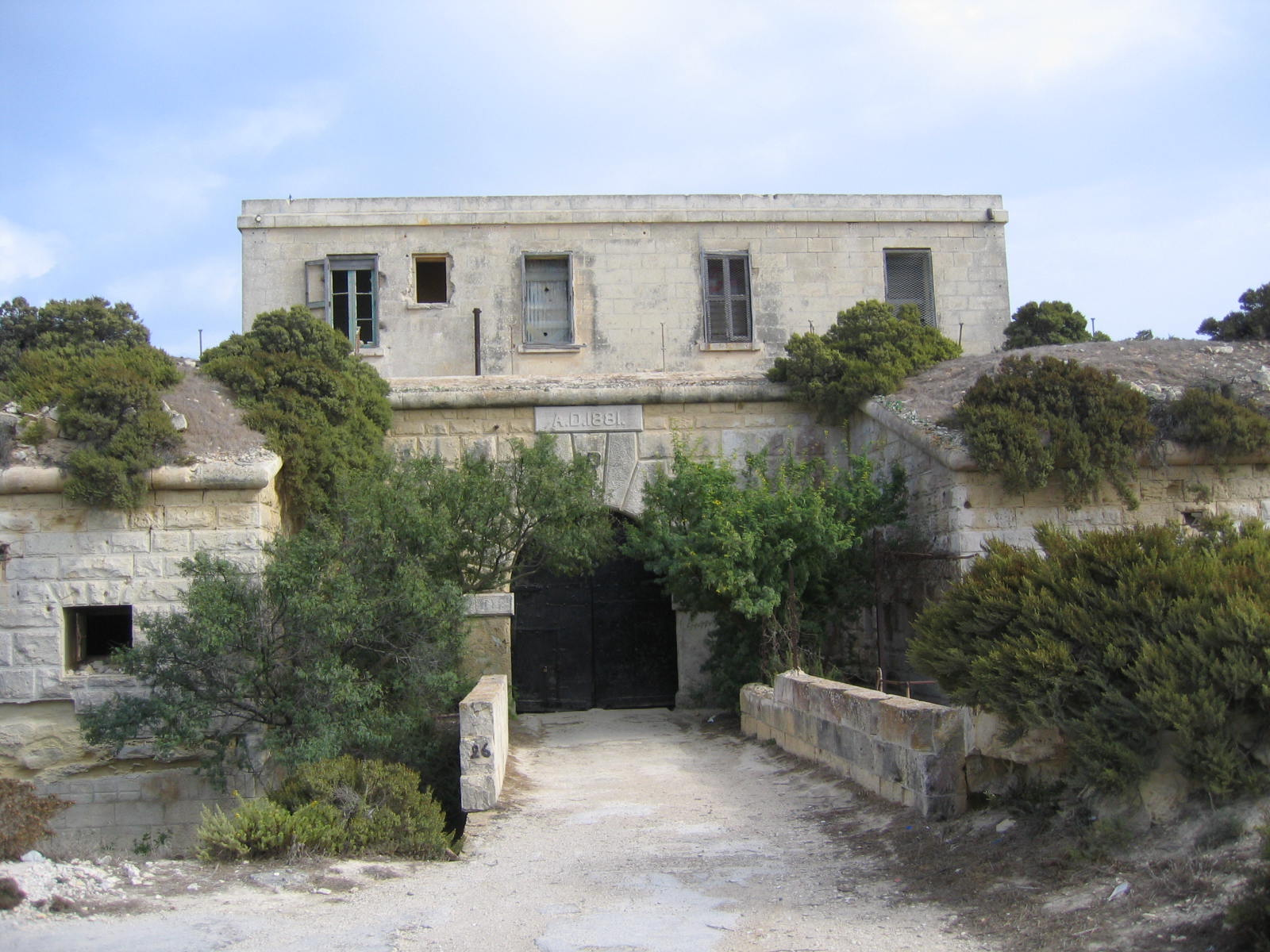
Gatehouse.

The ditches are edged with revetting, with the upper scarp faced in earth and rubble. A stone parapet with rifle loops runs along the top of the north scarp. A square building above the gate may be a later addition from the early twentieth century, when the fort was used as a military base long after its surface fortifications were obsolete. A World War II-era pillbox has been erected inside the Victorian fortification, and shows above the fort's profile when viewed from the sea. The gatehouse faces toward the landward end of Delimara Point, reached by a tarmac road that runs outside the north ditch. The gatehouse is close to the seaward end of the north ditch.

=== Counterscarp battery ===
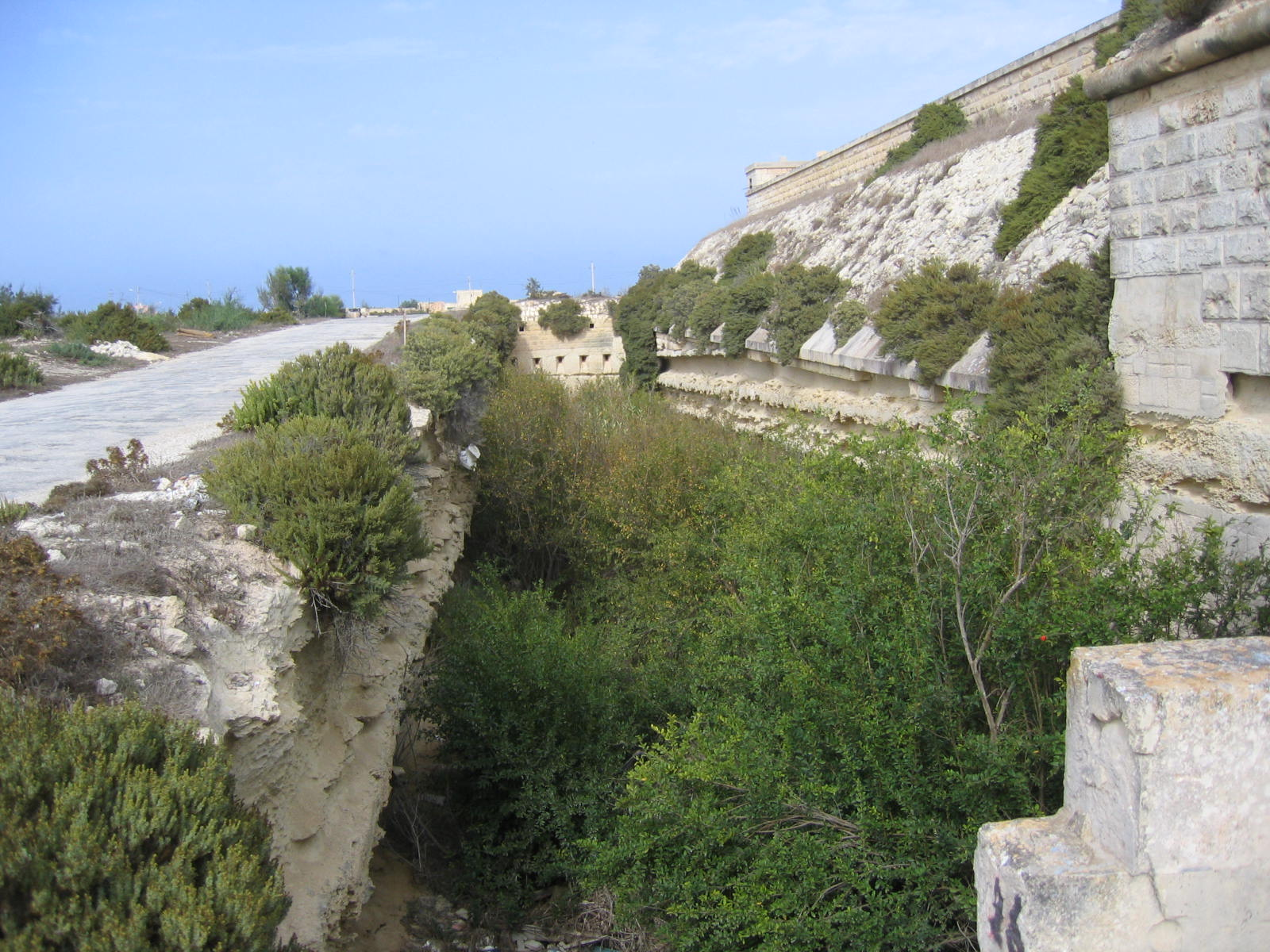
Counterscarp battery, looking east down the north ditch.

A counterscarp battery at the north end of the east ditch commands the north ditch and the gatehouse. Presumably there is a counterscarp battery at the south end of the east ditch covering the south ditch, since there are no caponiers visible in the ditch.

=== East and south ditches ===
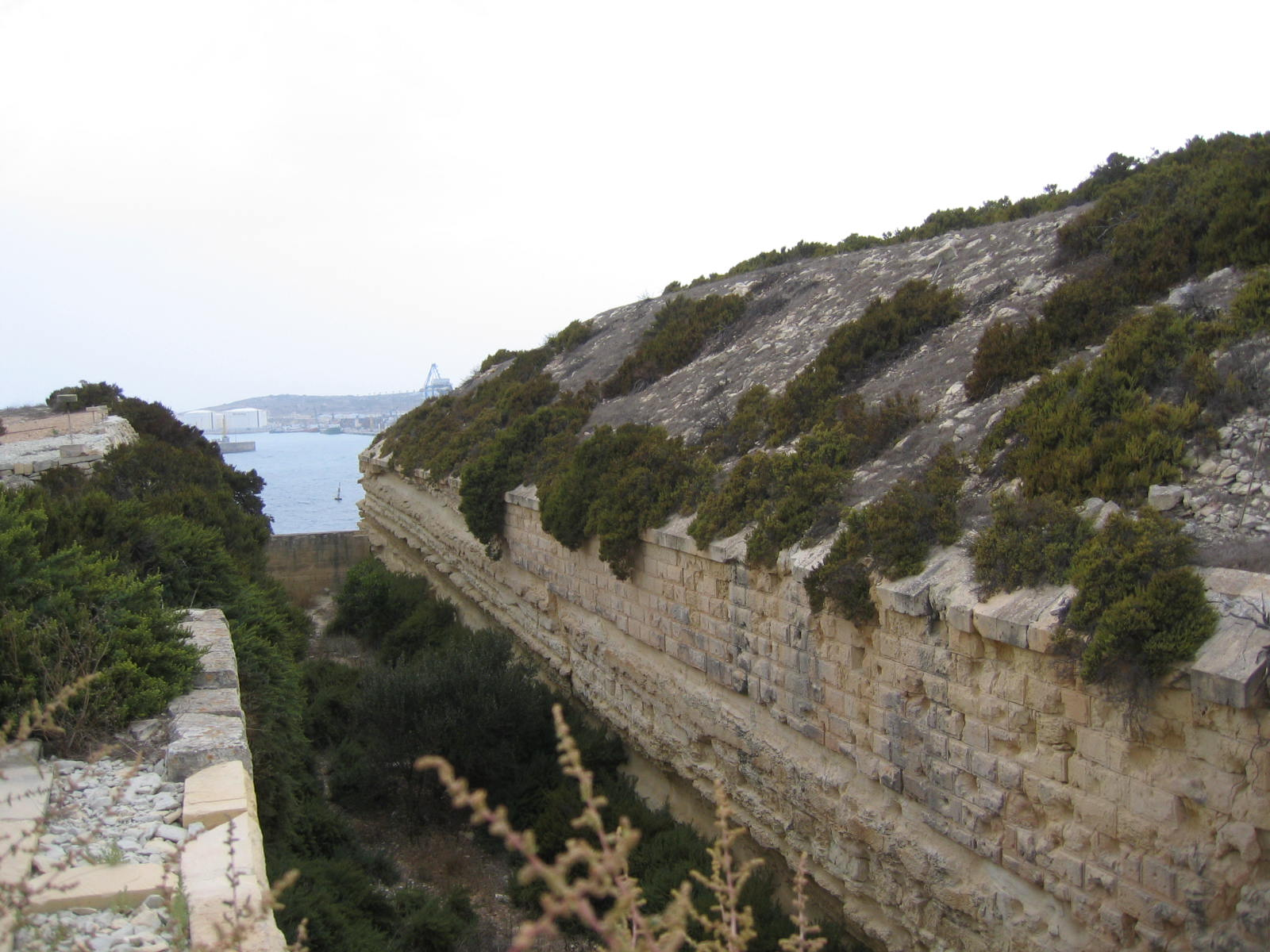
The south ditch looking west, Benghisa point and Fort Benghisa in the far distance across Marsaxlokk Bay

The glacis in front of the gatehouse has probably been reduced at some time to make road access easier, and the rolling bridge that would originally have crossed the ditch has been replaced by a permanent bridge. The road to Delimara Lighthouse along the east ditch of the fort disrupts the glacis on this face as well. The glacis is more intact along the south ditch, giving a better impression of how the fort would have looked when originally built.

=== Seaward face and gun emplacements ===
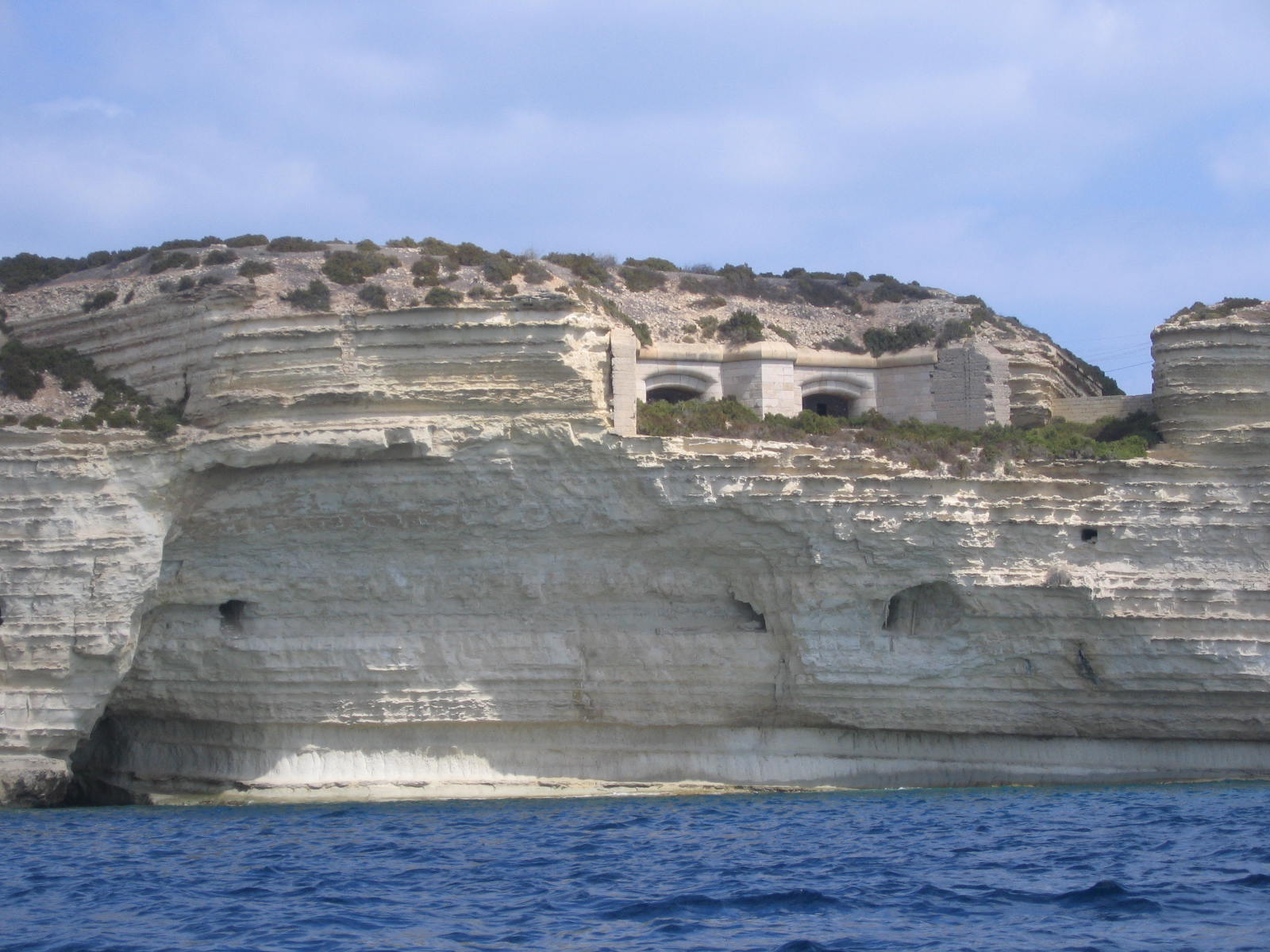
The south paired casemate, and the seaward termination of the south ditch.

The seaward face of the fort is dominated by the massive stone and concrete casemates that originally sheltered the fort's 12.5 inch rifled muzzle loading guns. The casemates are grouped in pairs close to the cliff top, capped by an earth and rubble slope, and follow the natural curve of the cliff face, giving them a combined field of fire that covers the majority of Marsaxlokk harbour.

== Present condition ==
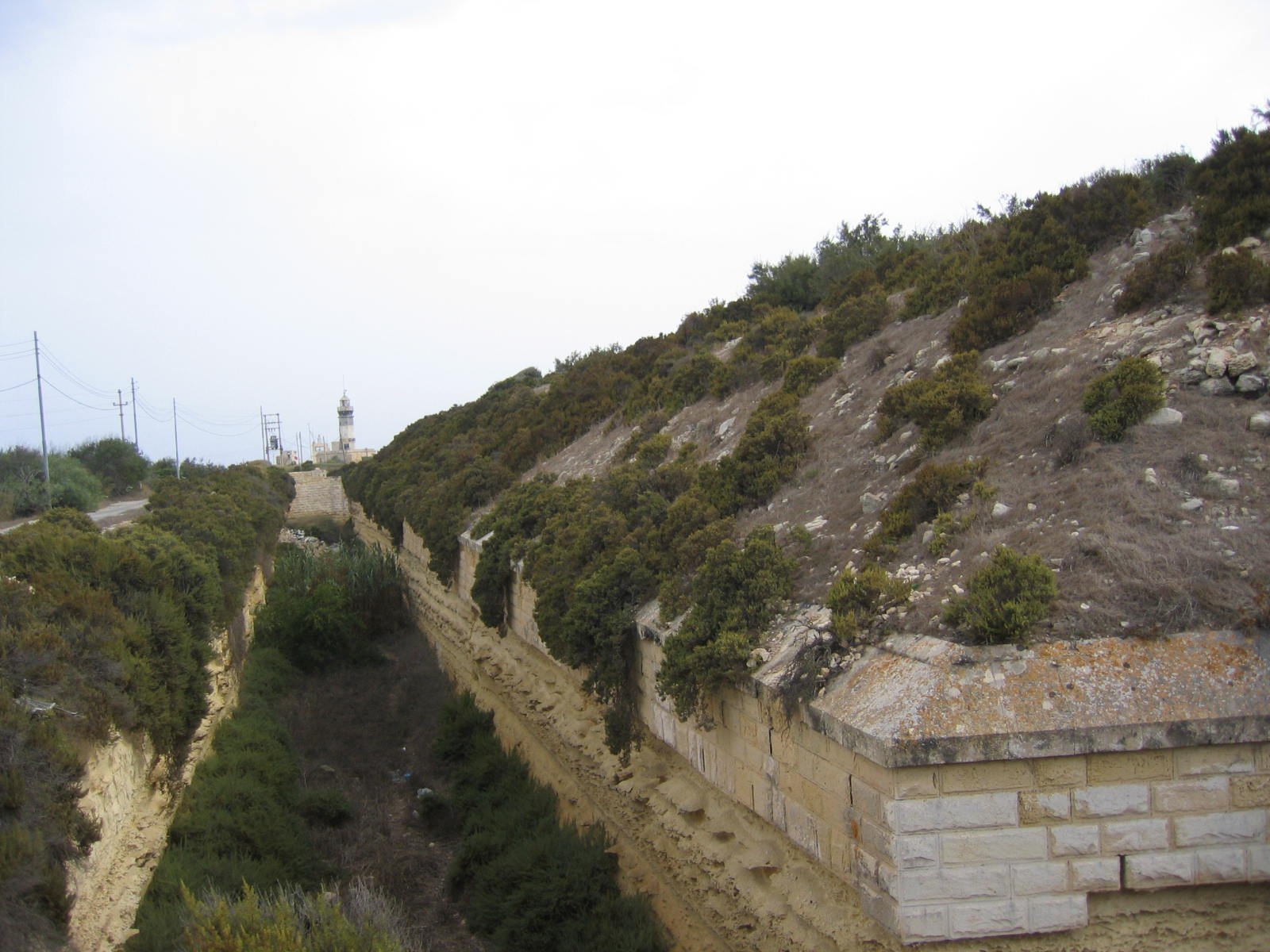
The east ditch looking south.

Externally the fort is in fair condition. Like all the polygonal forts in Malta, the limestone faces of the scarp and counterscarp have eroded substantially since they were originally cut, in places to a depth of as much as a metre. In some cases this erosion has reached the point that the revetting collapses into the ditch.

Where the road to Delimara Lighthouse runs along the east ditch of the fort, directly above the counterscarp face of the ditch a section of perhaps ten metres the counterscarp has collapsed into the ditch, and threatens the stability of the road. The resulting rubble fall can be seen in the image of the east ditch.

The ditch is also considerably overgrown, and polluted with general rubbish, unfortunately true of all the Victorian forts in Malta. There is currently no public access to the interior of the fort.

The fort is in danger of collapse, mainly due to coastal erosion and wave action which were only made worse with the building of the Delimara Power Station and the breakwater of the Malta Freeport nearby. Parts of the nearby cliff face have already collapsed. No plans have been made for the restoration of the fort, mainly due to a lack of funds. Din l-Art Ħelwa said that restoration would cost millions of euros and take about 10 years.

In 2015, the fort was shortlisted as a possible site for the campus of the proposed American University of Malta. It was not chosen, and the campus is to be split up between Dock No. 1 in Cospicua and Żonqor Point in Marsaskala.

== In popular culture ==
- The fort was used in the filming of the 2016 film Assassin's Creed.

== Gallery ==
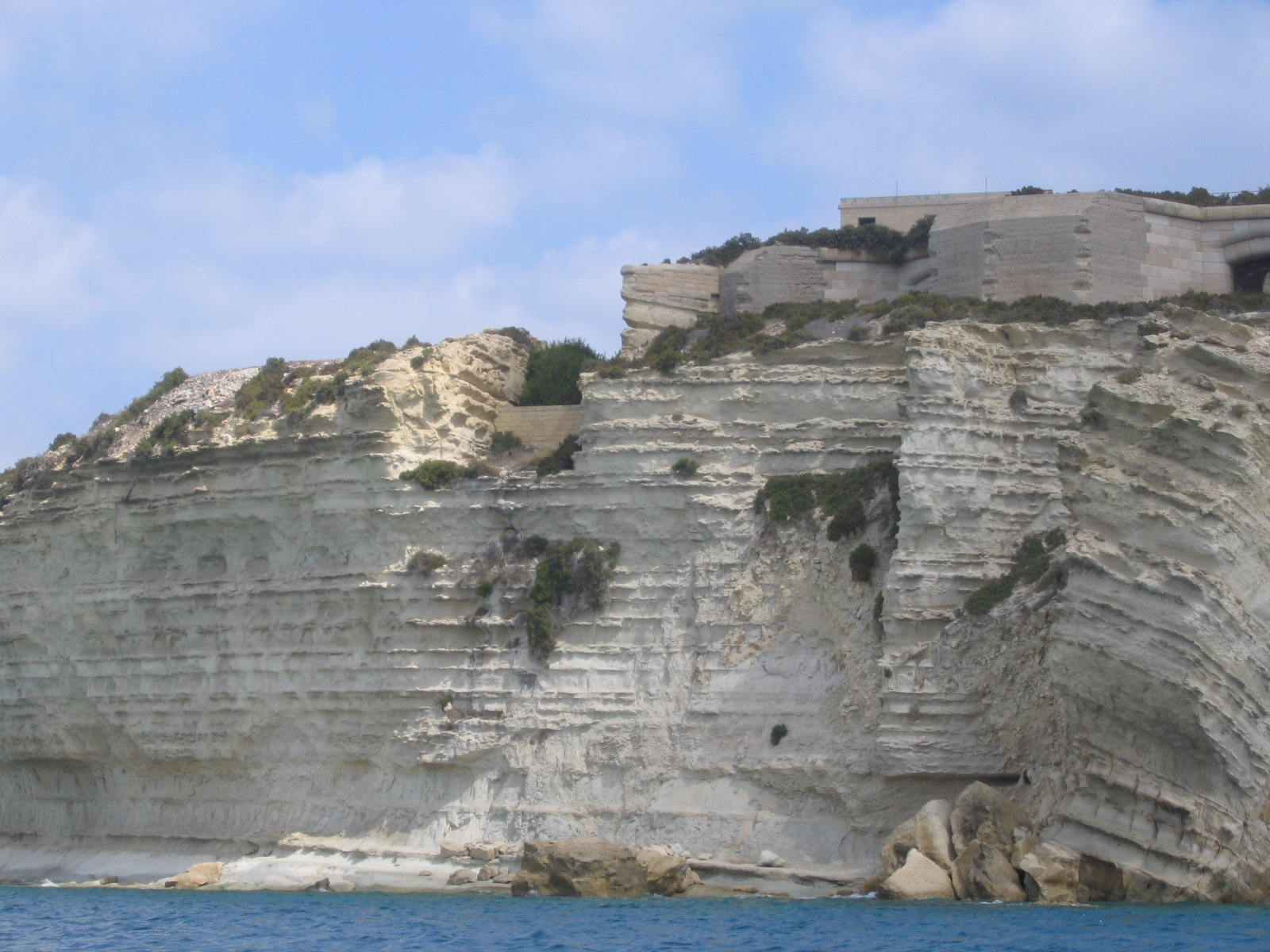
North casemates and the end of the north ditch

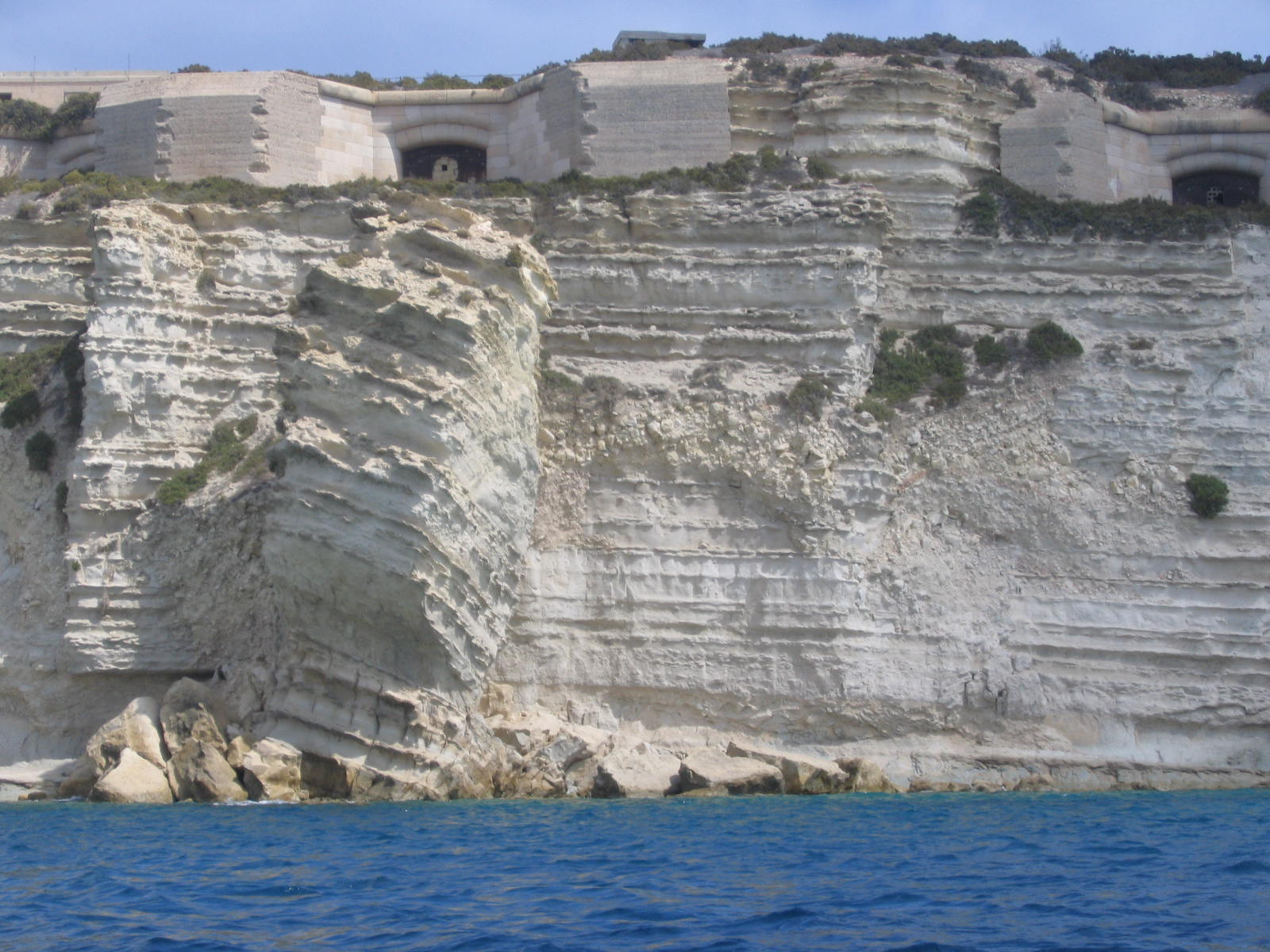
Centre sections of the battery

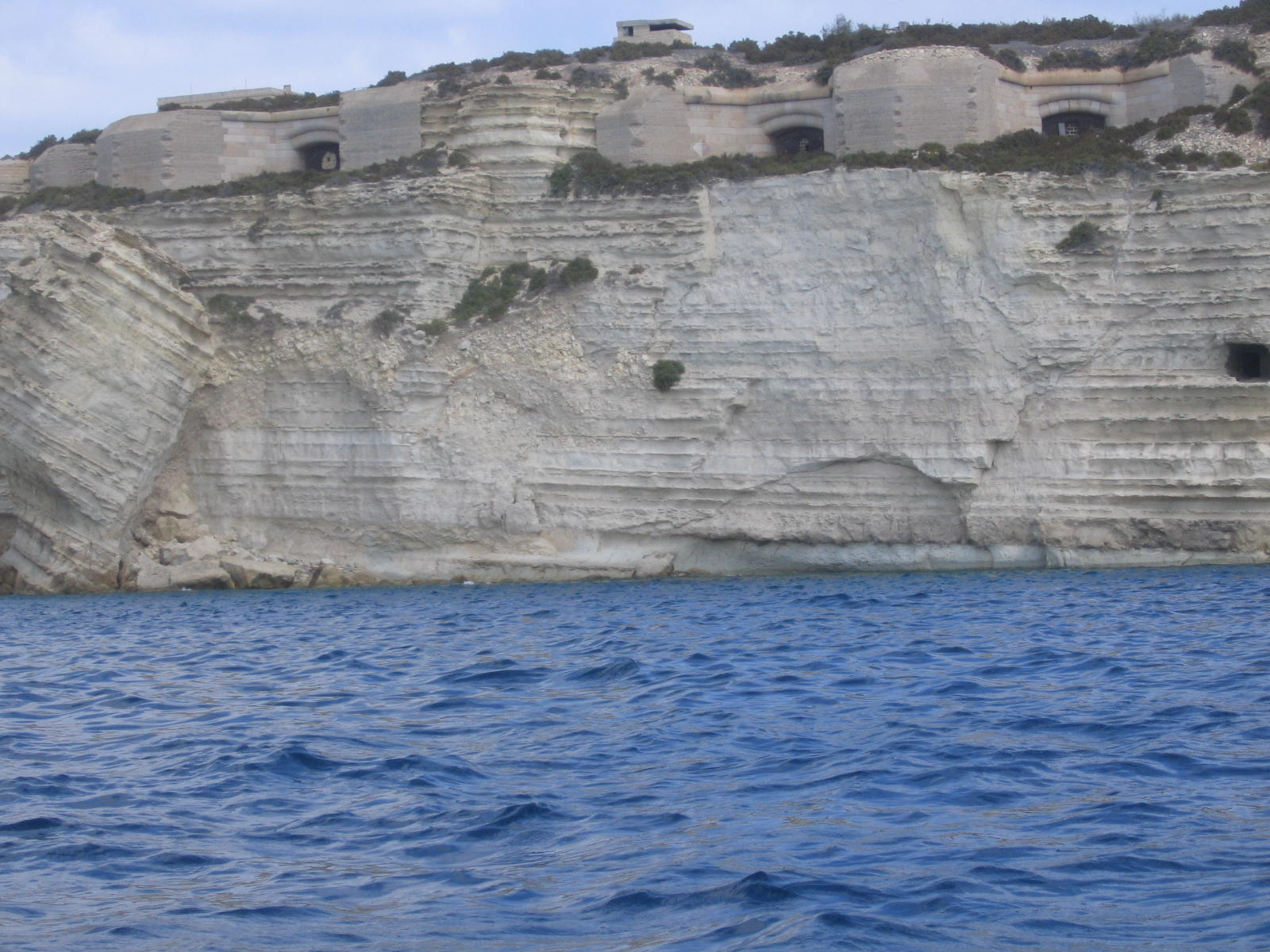
Centre sections of the battery

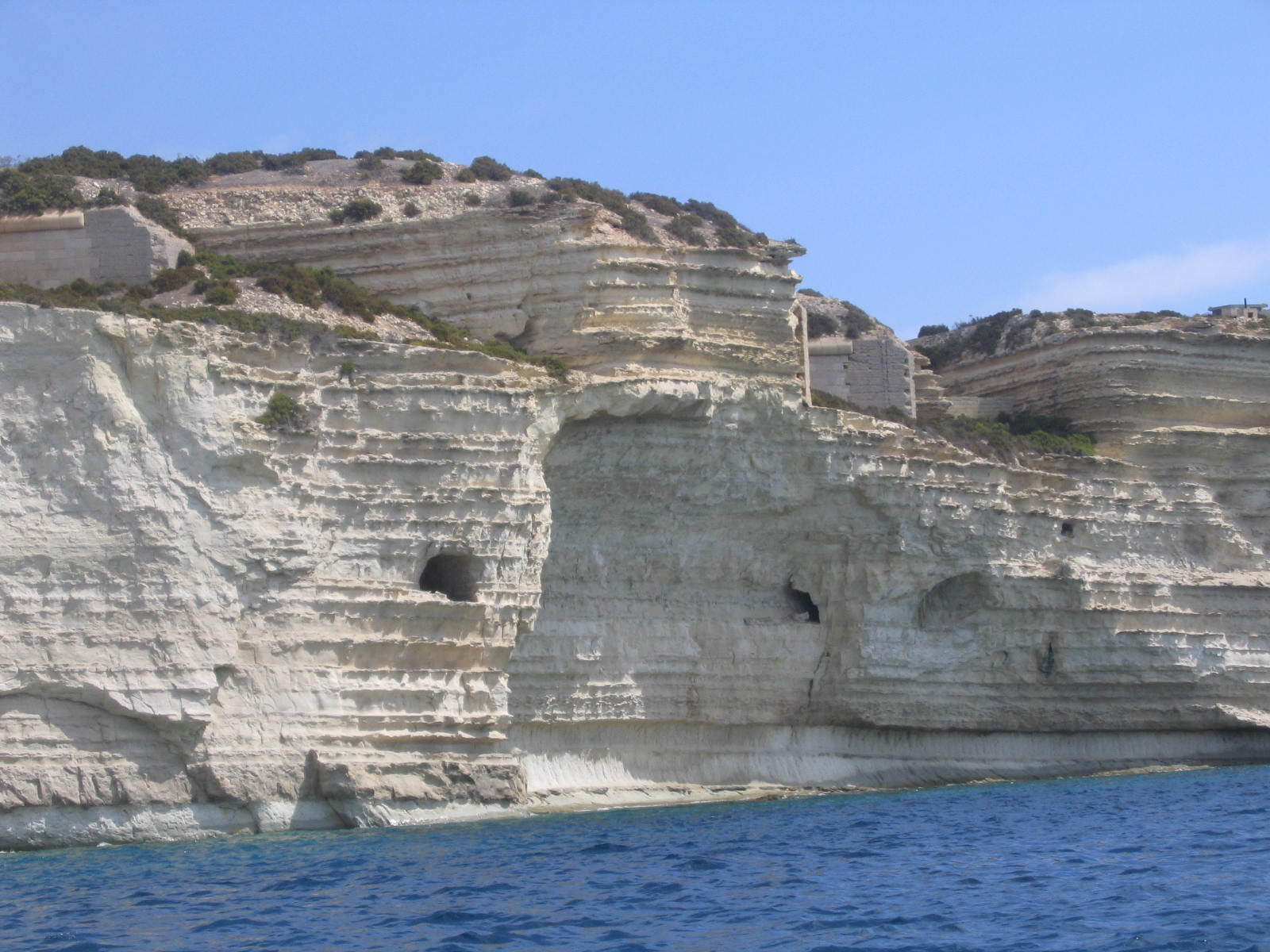
South casemates and the end of the south ditch

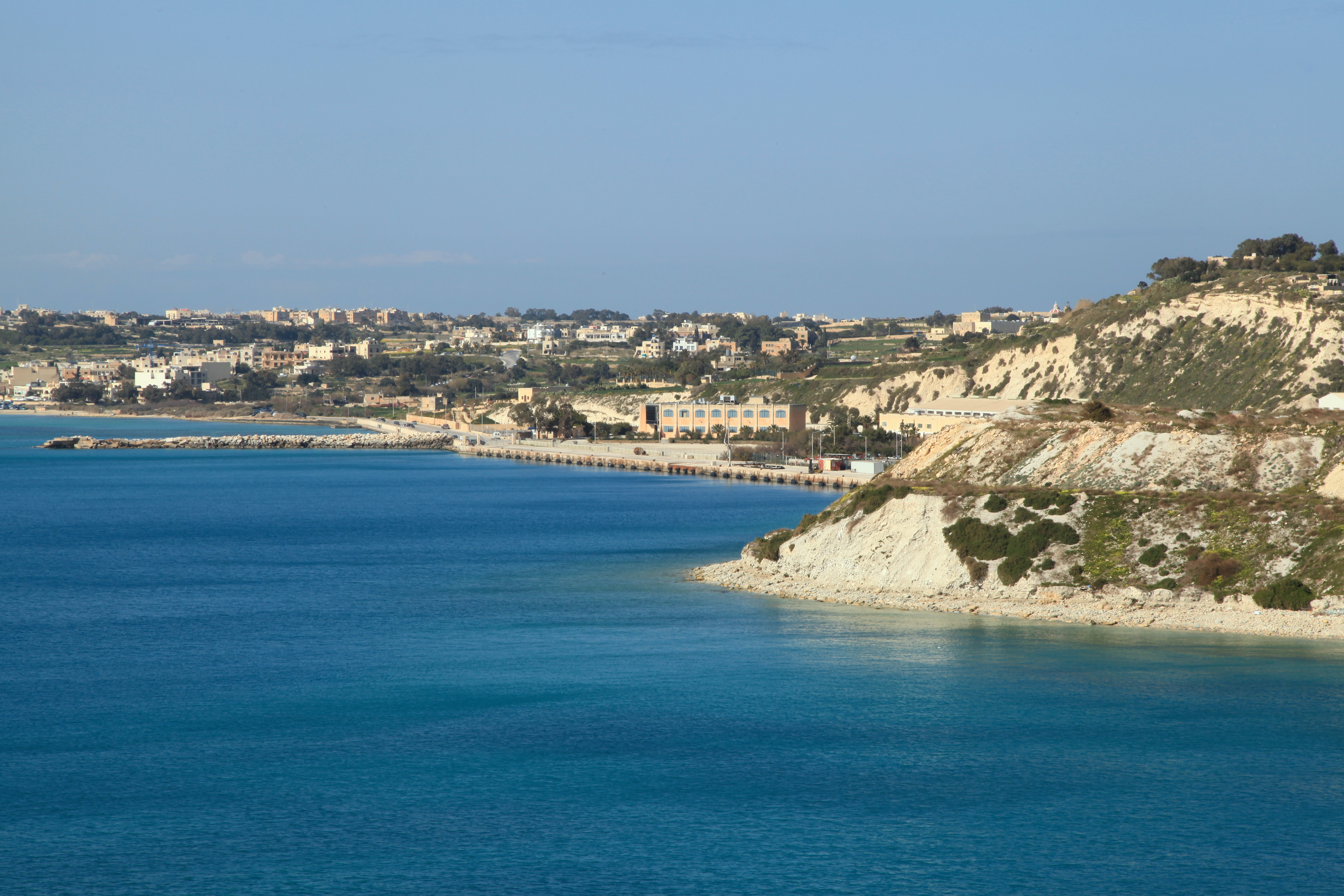
View from the fort
