= Fort Benghisa =

Polygonal fort in Birżebbuġa, Malta

- Il-Fortizza ta' Bengħisa
- Birżebbuġa, Malta
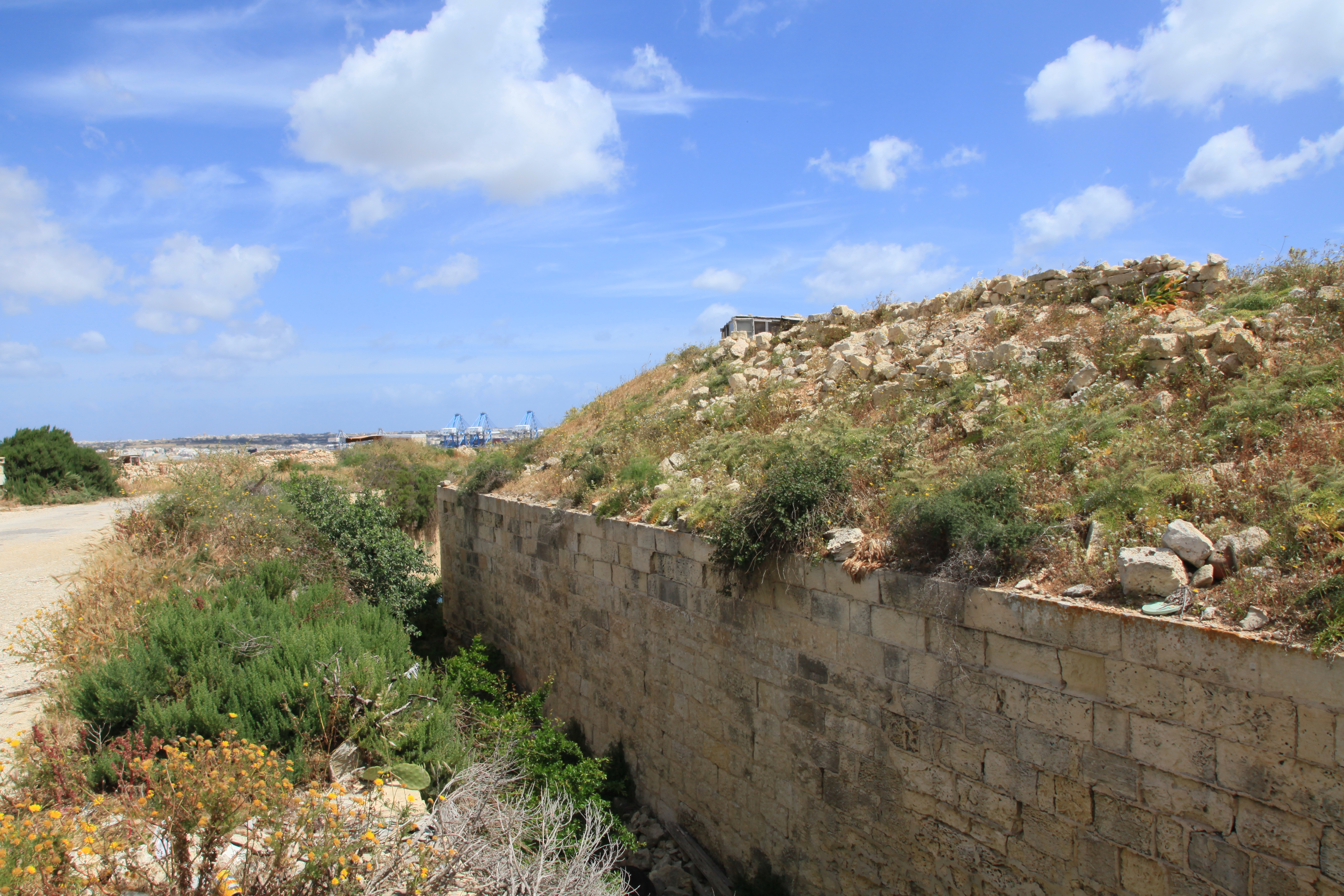
- Fort Benghisa

Site information
- Type: Polygonal fort
- Owner: Government of Malta
- Controlled by: Heritage Malta
- Open to the public: No
- Condition: Ongoing Restoration - Intact

Location
- Coordinates: 35°48′30″N 14°31′56″E

Site history
- Built: 1910–1912
- Built by: British Empire
- In use: 1912–1970s
- Materials: Limestone and Concrete

Fort Benghisa (Maltese: Il-Fortizza ta' Bengħisa) is a polygonal fort in Birżebbuġa, Malta. It was built between 1910 and 1912 by the British on high ground on the seaward face of Benghisa Point, the southern arm of Marsaxlokk Bay. It is the southernmost fortification in Malta.

It was part of a chain of fortifications intended to protect Marsaxlokk Harbour, along with Fort Delimara and Fort Tas-Silġ on Delimara point, the north arm of Marsaxlokk Bay, Fort San Lucian on Kbira point in the middle of the bay, and the Pinto and Ferretti batteries on the coast.

== History ==
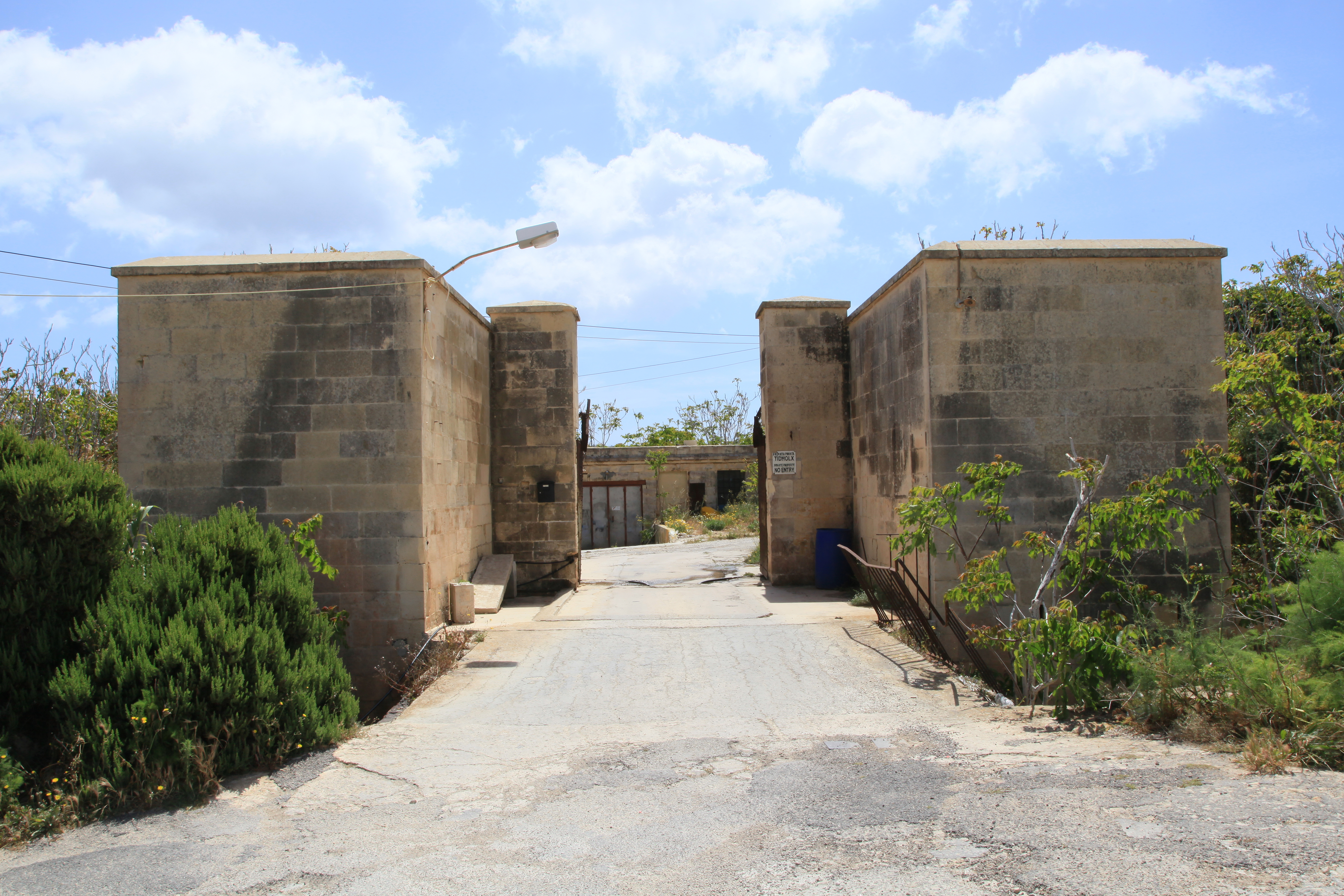
The fort's gatehouse

Initially, a battery called Hassan Battery was proposed at Benghisa Point. However, the design was developed into a polygonal fort in 1909. Construction started in 1910 and was completed in 1912. The fort was armed with two 6 inch and two 9.2 inch breech loading guns. The 17th-century Bengħisa Tower, one of the De Redin towers, was demolished to clear Fort Benghisa's line of fire in 1915.

The fort has a ditched pentagonal perimeter, with the perimeter wall and parapet being built from earth excavated during the building of the ditch. The cliffs on the seaward side were also used as part of the fort's defensive perimeter. Fort Benghisa was the last polygonal fort that the British built in Malta.

The fort was rearmed prior to World War II. In the 1950s, dual purpose guns were installed but these were dismantled soon after. It was finally abandoned by the British in the late 1970s.

=== Present day ===
The fort was in private hands and its interior is inaccessible up until 2025. Part of the fort was rented in 1973 for an annual sum equivalent to €93, while other parts were rented out in 1981 and 1996 for an annual €177 and €419 respectively. The rents were renewed until 2011, when the government stopped accepting them with the intention to evict the tenants. A 2016 enforcement notice was ignored by the squatters, and the government eventually took back possession of the fort in February 2025.The government of Malta officially handed over to Heritage Malta in April 2026, with the intention of beginning a full restoration immediately and opening it for the public.

The fort and its environs are currently in a state of neglect, although the gatehouse and the shoreward ditch are in decent shape.
