= Saint Paul's Battery =

Artillery battery in Marsaxlokk, Malta

- Batterija ta' San Pawl
- Marsaxlokk, Malta
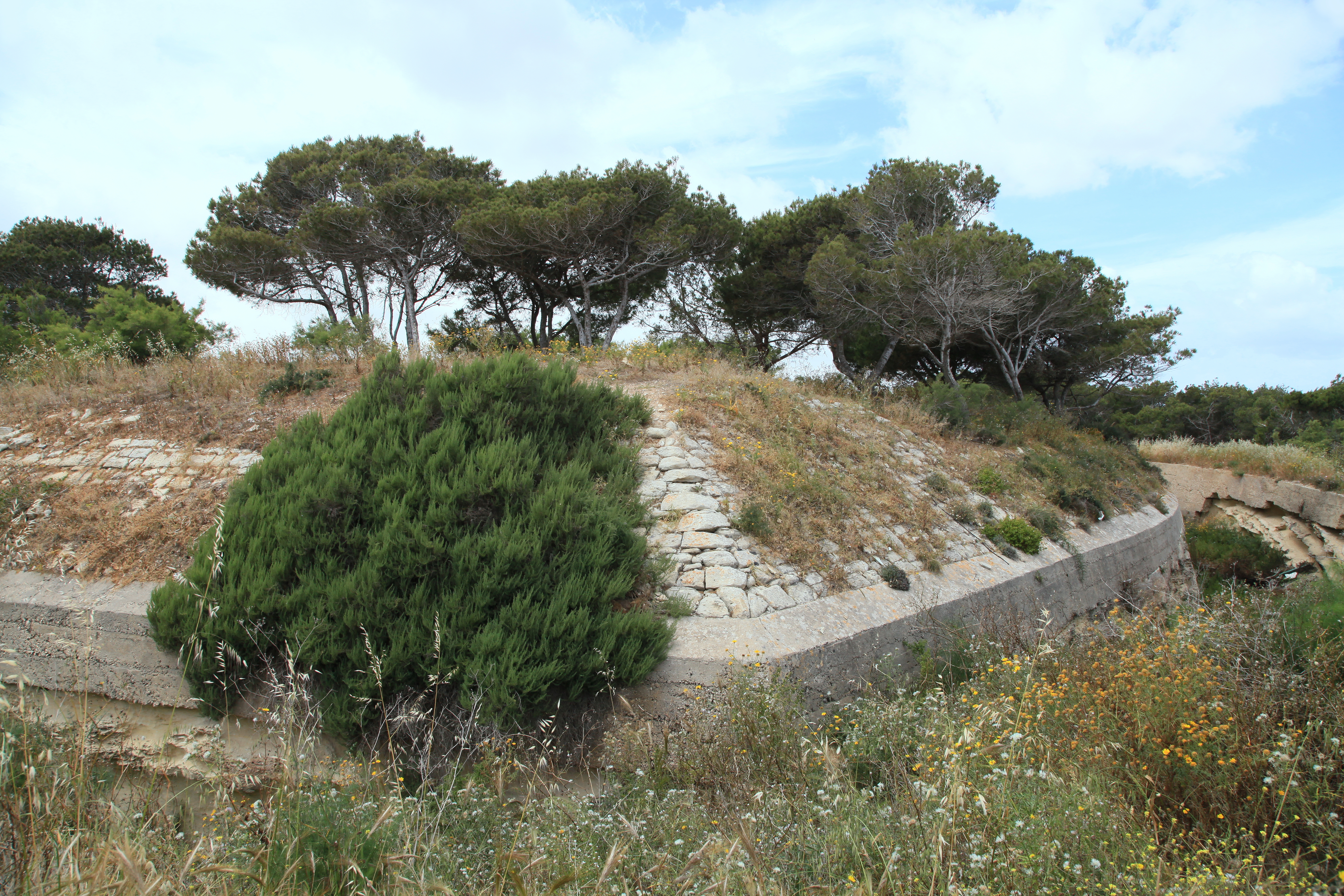
- Saint Paul's Battery

Site information
- Type: Artillery battery
- Open to the public: No
- Condition: Abandoned

Location
- Coordinates: 35°50′36″N 14°33′36″E
- Area: 13,500 m^{2} (145,000 sq ft)

Site history
- Built: 1881–1886
- Built by: British Empire
- In use: 1886–1900
- Materials: Limestone and concrete

Saint Paul's Battery (Maltese: Batterija ta' San Pawl), also known as Ta' Lombardi Battery (Maltese: Batterija ta' Lombardi), is an artillery battery in Marsaxlokk, Malta. It stands on high ground at the shoreward end of Delimara Point, above il-Ħofra-z-Zgħira. It is a polygonal fort and was built by the British from 1881 to 1886. It commands a field of fire northwards over St Thomas' Bay and Marsaskala.

Approximately 350 m (1,150 ft) south is Fort Tas-Silġ, a much larger polygonal style fortification.

== History ==
St Paul's Battery was built between 1881 and 1886 by the British to help Fort Tas-Silġ cover the defence of St Thomas Bay. The battery has a D-shape, with three gun emplacements for RML 7 inch gun, which were mounted on six-foot platforms. Its gun crew and garrison were stationed at Fort Tas-Silġ.

The battery's guns were removed and it was abandoned around 1900 since it had lost its importance as a defensive position.

== Present day ==
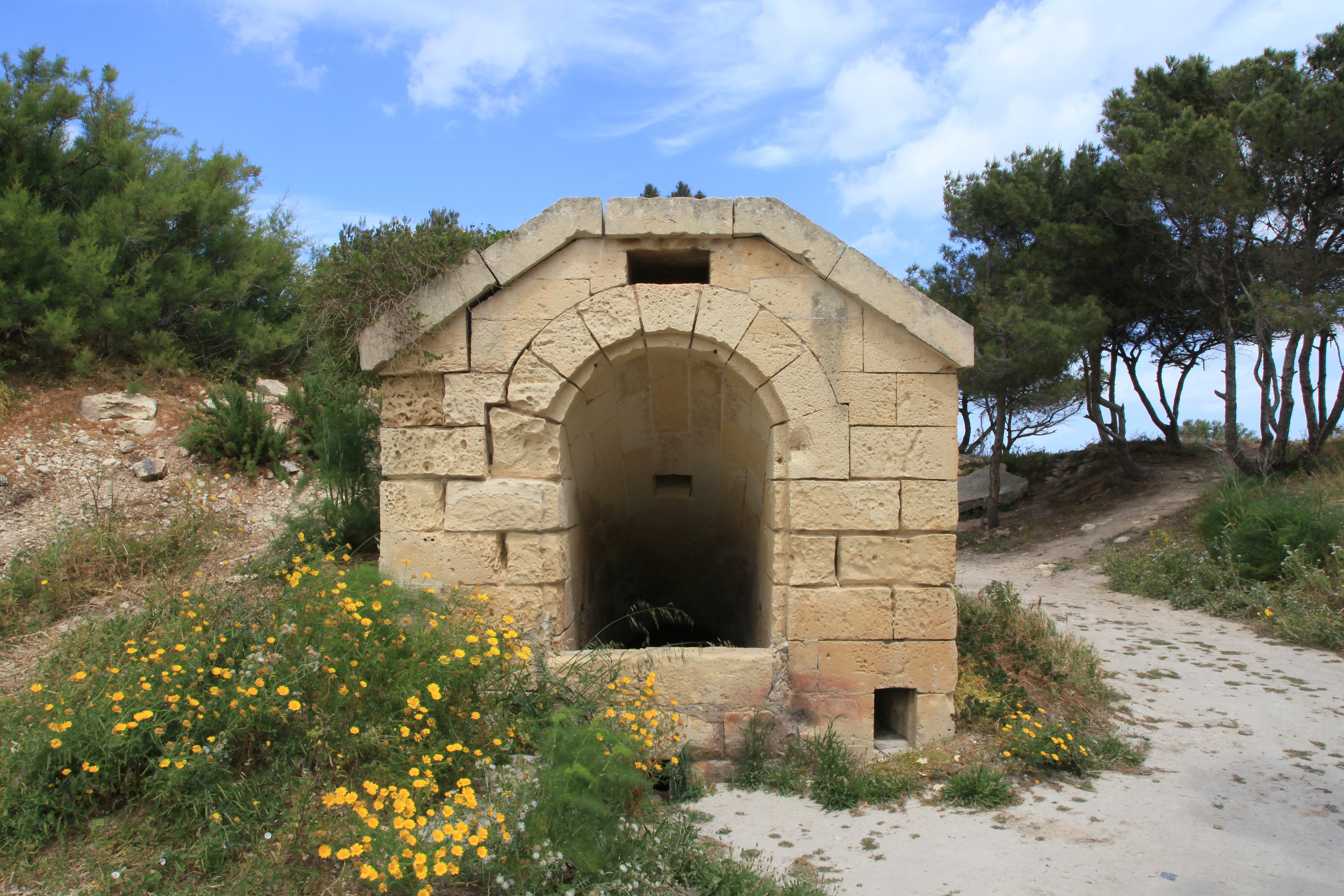
Entrance to an underground magazine at St. Paul's Battery

The battery remains abandoned to this day and in very poor condition. It is covered with trees and shrubs and its ditch is filled with debris, but the gun emplacements, ditch and entrance to its underground magazine are still visible.

In 2015, the battery was shortlisted as a possible site for the campus of the proposed American University of Malta. It was not chosen, and the campus is to be split up between Dock No. 1 in Cospicua and Żonqor Point in Marsaskala.
